= 2nd Parliament of the Province of Canada =

British colonial legislature from 1844 to 1847

The 2nd Parliament of the Province of Canada was summoned in 1844, following the general elections for the Legislative Assembly in October 1844. It first met on November 28, 1844. It was dissolved in December 1847. All sessions were held at Montreal, Canada East.

The Speaker of the Legislative Assembly was Allan Napier MacNab.

== Members ==
=== Canada East ===
Riding	Member	Party	First elected/previously elected	No. of terms
Beauharnois	Eden Colvile	Tory	1844	1st term
Bellechasse	Augustin-Norbert Morin	Patriote	1830, 1841, (Note: Nicolet) 1842	6th term*
Berthier	David Morrison Armstrong	Patriote	1841	2nd term
Bonaventure	John Le Boutillier	Conservative	1833, (Note: Gaspé) 1844	3rd term*
Chambly	Louis Lacoste	Patriote	1834, 1843	3rd term
Champlain	Louis Guillet	Patriote	1844	1st term
Deux-Montagnes	William Henry Scott	Reformer	1829, (Note: York) 1844	4th term*
Dorchester	Pierre-Elzéar Taschereau (Note: died in July 1845; Joseph-André Taschereau was elected in a by-election held in September 1845.)	Patriote	1844	1st term
Dorchester	Joseph-André Taschereau (1845) (Note: resigned in May 1847 to become a judge; François-Xavier Lemieux was elected in a by-election held in July 1847.)	Patriote	1845	1st term
Dorchester	François-Xavier Lemieux (1847)	Patriote	1847	1st term
Drummond	Robert Nugent Watts	Conservative	1841	2nd term
Gaspé	Robert Christie	Independent	1841	2nd term
Huntingdon	Benjamin-Henri Le Moine	Patriote	1844	1st term
Kamouraska	Amable Berthelot	Patriote	1814, (Note: Trois-Rivières) 1824, 1834, (Note: Quebec (Upper Town)) 1841	5th term*
Leinster	Jacob De Witt	Patriote	1830, (Note: Beauharnois) 1842	4th term*
L'Islet	Étienne-Paschal Taché	Patriote	1841	2nd term
L'Islet	Charles-François Fournier (1847)	Patriote	1847	1st term
Lotbinière	Joseph Laurin	Patriote	1844	1st term
Megantick	Dominick Daly	Conservative	1841	2nd term
Missiskoui	James Smith (Note: resigned after being named judge; William Badgley was elected in a by-election held in June 1847.)	Conservative	1844	1st term
Missiskoui	William Badgley (1847)	Conservative	1847	1st term
Montmorency	Joseph-Édouard Cauchon	Patriote	1844	1st term
Montreal	George Moffatt	Tory	1841, 1844	2nd term*
Montreal	Clément-Charles Sabrevois de Bleury	Conservative	1844	1st term
Montreal County	André Jobin	Reformer	1835, 1843	3rd term*
Nicolet	Antoine-Prosper Méthot	Patriote	1844	1st term
Ottawa County	Denis-Benjamin Papineau	Reformer	1842	2nd term
Portneuf	Lewis Thomas Drummond	Reformer	1844	1st term
Quebec County	Pierre-Joseph-Olivier Chauveau	Reformer	1844	1st term
Quebec City	Thomas Cushing Aylwin	Patriote	1844	1st term
Quebec City	Jean Chabot	Conservative	1843	2nd term
Richelieu	Wolfred Nelson	Patriote	1827, (Note: William-Henry) 1844	2nd term*
Rimouski	Louis Bertrand	Patriote	1832, 1844	3rd term*
Rouville	Timothée Franchère	Patriote	1843	2nd term
Saguenay	Augustin-Norbert Morin (Note: Augustin-Norbert Morin was elected in both Bellechasse and Saguenay, choosing to sit in Bellechasse; Marc-Pascal de Sales Laterrière was elected to represent Saguenay in an 1845 by-election.)	Patriote	1830, (Note: Bellechasse) 1841, (Note: Nicolet) 1842	5th term*
Saguenay	Marc-Pascal de Sales Laterrière (1845)	Patriote	1845	1st term
St. Hyacinthe	Thomas Boutillier	Patriote	1841	2nd term
Saint-Maurice	François Lesieur Desaulniers	Patriote	1836, 1844	2nd term*
Shefford	Sewell Foster	Conservative	1841	2nd term
Sherbrooke	Edward Hale	Conservative	1841	2nd term
Sherbrooke County	Samuel Brooks	Conservative	1844	1st term
Stanstead	John McConnell	Conservative	1844	1st term
Terrebonne	Louis-Hippolyte Lafontaine	Patriote	1830, 1842	4th term*
Three Rivers	Edward Greive (Note: died in June 1845; Denis-Benjamin Viger was elected in a by-election held in July 1845.)	Conservative	1844	1st term
Three Rivers	Denis-Benjamin Viger (1845)	Patriote	1808, (Note: Montreal West/Leinster/Kent) 1841, (Note: Richelieu) 1845	11th term*
Vaudreuil	Jacques-Philippe Lantier	Patriote	1844	1st term
Verchères	James Leslie	Patriote	1841	2nd term
Yamaska	Léon Rousseau	Patriote	1844	1st term

=== Canada West ===
Riding	Member	Party	First elected/previously elected	No. of terms
Brockville	George Sherwood	Tory	1841	2nd term
Bytown	William Stewart	Conservative	1844	1st term
Carleton	James Johnston (Note: resigned in May 1846; George Lyon was elected in a by-election held in June 1846.)	Reformer	1841	2nd term
Carleton	George Lyon (1846)	Conservative	1830, 1846	2nd term*
Cornwall	Rolland Macdonald (Note: resigned his seat in 1846 to allow John Hillyard Cameron to be elected in a by-election in August 1846.)	Independent	1844	1st term
Cornwall	John Hillyard Cameron (1846)	Conservative	1846	1st term
Dundas	George Greenfield Macdonell	Tory	1844	1st term
Durham	John Tucker Williams	Tory	1841	2nd term
Essex	John Prince	Independent	1836	3rd term
Frontenac	Henry Smith, Jr	Conservative	1841	2nd term
Glengarry	John Sandfield Macdonald	Reformer	1841	2nd term
Grenville	Hamilton Dibble Jessup	Conservative	1844	1st term
Haldimand	David Thompson	Reformer	1841	2nd term
Halton East	George Chalmers	Conservative	1844	1st term
Halton West	James Webster	Conservative	1844	1st term
Hamilton	Allan Napier MacNab	Conservative	1830	5th term
Hastings	Edmund Murney	Tory	1836, 1842	3rd term*
Huron	William Dunlop (Note: resigned to accept an appointment; this allowed William Cayley to run for his seat in February 1846.)	Conservative	1841	2nd term
Huron	William Cayley (1846)	Conservative	1846	1st term
Kent	Samuel Bealey Harrison (Note: resigned in 1845 to accept an appointment; Joseph Woods won the seat in a by-election.)	Reformer	1841	2nd term
Kent	Joseph Woods (1845)	Conservative	1841, 1845	2nd term*
Kingston	John A. Macdonald	Conservative	1844	1st term
Lanark	Malcolm Cameron	Reformer	1841	2nd term
Leeds	Ogle Robert Gowan	Conservative	1834, 1844	3rd term*
Lennox and Addington	Benjamin Seymour	Tory	1844	1st term
Lincoln North	William Hamilton Merritt	Reformer	1832	5th term
Lincoln South	James Cummings	Conservative	1844	1st term
London	Lawrence Lawrason (Note: gave up his seat so that William Henry Draper could lead the government in the assembly.)	Conservative	1844	1st term
London	William Henry Draper (1845) (Note: resigned in 1847 and John Wilson won the seat in a by-election.)	Conservative	1836, (Note: Russell) 1847	2nd term*
London	John Wilson (1847)	Conservative	1847	1st term
Middlesex	Edward Ermatinger	Conservative	1844	1st term
Niagara (town)	Walter Hamilton Dickson	Independent	1844	1st term
Norfolk	Israel Wood Powell	Moderate Reformer	1841	2nd term
Northumberland North	Adam H Meyers	Independent	1844	1st term
Northumberland South	George Barker Hall	Conservative	1844	1st term
Oxford	Robert Riddell	Conservative	1844	1st term
Prescott	Neil Stewart	Independent	1844	1st term
Prince Edward	John Philip Roblin (Note: resigned in 1846 to accept other appointments in Prince Edward County; R B Conger was elected to his seat in a by-election.)	Reformer	1830, 1841	4th term*
Prince Edward	Roger B Conger (1847)	Independent	1847	1st term
Russell	Archibald Petrie	Conservative	1844	1st term
Simcoe	William Benjamin Robinson	Conservative	1830, 1844	4th term*
Stormont	Donald Aeneas MacDonell	Reformer	1834, 1844	3rd term*
Toronto	William Henry Boulton	Conservative	1844	1st term
Toronto	Henry Sherwood	Conservative	1836, (Note: Brockville) 1843	3rd term*
Wentworth	Harmannus Smith	Moderate Reformer	1834, 1841	3rd term*
1st York	James Hervey Price	Reformer	1841	2nd term
2nd York	George Duggan	Conservative	1841	2nd term
3rd York	James Edward Small (Note: disqualified in 1844; George Monro was declared elected.)	Reformer	1841	2nd term
3rd York	George Monro (1844)	Conservative	1844	1st term
4th York	Robert Baldwin	Reformer	1829, (Note: York (town)) 1841	4th term*
