= 1st Parliament of the Province of Canada =

British colonial legislature from 1841 to 1844

Parliament of the Province of Canada Parlement de la Province du Canada
- First Parliament, 1841 – 1844

Type
- Type: Bicameral
- Houses: Legislative Council; Legislative Assembly
- Term limits: Four years, subject to earlier dissolution

History
- Founded: February 10, 1841
- New session started: 2nd Parliament of the Province of Canada, 1844–1847

Leadership
- Monarch: Victoria
- Governor General of the Canadas: Lord Sydenham, 1841; Major-General John Clitherow (Deputy), 1841; Lieutenant-General Sir Richard Downes Jackson (Administrator), 1841–1842
- Premier: Samuel Harrison, 1841–1842 (Reform); William Henry Draper, 1842 (Upper Canada Tories); Louis-Hippolyte Lafontaine, 1842–1843 (Reform); Sir Dominick Daly, 1843 (Acting premier); William Henry Draper, 1843–1847 (Upper Canada Tories)
- Deputy Premier: William Henry Draper, 1841–1842 (Upper Canada Tories); Charles Richard Ogden, 1842 (Government supporter); Robert Baldwin 1842–1843 (Reform); Denis-Benjamin Viger 1843–1846 (Groupe canadien-français)
- Speaker of the Legislative Council: Robert Sympson Jameson, 1841–1842; Peter McGill, 1842–1847
- Speaker of the Legislative Assembly: Austin Cuvillier, 1841–1844 (Groupe canadien-français)
- Seats: Legislative Council: 24; Legislative Assembly: 84

Elections
- Legislative Council voting system: Life appointments
- Legislative Assembly voting system: Single member constituencies First-past-the-post voting Open ballot system Adult male franchise with property qualification

Constitution
- Act of Union 1840

The First Parliament of the Province of Canada was summoned in 1841, following the union of Upper Canada and Lower Canada as the Province of Canada on February 10, 1841. The Parliament continued until dissolution in late 1844.

The Parliament of the Province had two chambers: the elected lower house, the Legislative Assembly, and the appointed upper house, the Legislative Council. The first general election for the Legislative Assembly was held in April, 1841. Canada East (formerly Lower Canada) and Canada West (formerly Upper Canada)) each had forty-two seats in the Legislative Assembly. The members of the Legislative Council, twenty-four in number, were appointed by the British Governor General, Lord Sydenham.

All sessions were held at Kingston, Canada West, with the first session of the Parliament called in June 1841. The Parliament had three annual sessions, but then was prorogued for close to a year due to a political crisis in the relations between the Legislative Assembly and the Governor General. The Parliament was dissolved in September, 1844, triggering the second general election for the Province, and the second Parliament, which met in Montreal.

In 1841, the District Councils Act was passed which established a system of local government in Canada West based on district councils. Prior to 1841, local affairs were dealt with by the District Court of Quarter Sessions.

== First government and election ==
The Governor General, Lord Sydenham, appointed the first members to the Executive Council on February 13, 1841. All of the members were anglophones, with no francophones. They were appointed as advisors to the Governor General, who continued to exercise the executive powers of the government.

The first general election for the new Legislative Assembly was held in the spring of 1841. There was no single election date – members in different districts were elected on different days. The returning officer in each electoral district chose the date for the election in their district.

The Governor General, following the policy of assimilation set out in Lord Durham's Report, drew boundaries and chose the location of polling stations in Canada East in anglophone areas, in an effort to favour voters of British stock and to make it more difficult for francophone voters to exercise their franchise.

The election was marred by violence. In the district of Montreal, riots broke out in six counties. At St. Laurent, an English mob scattered French voters, and then when the Tories had a majority, it closed down the vote although only a hundred voters had voted in a district with a population of 60,000.

In the riding of Terrebonne in Canada East, the threat of a riot at the polling station forced Louis-Hippolyte Lafontaine, a proponent of responsible government, to withdraw his candidacy. In response, Robert Baldwin in Canada West, also a supporter of responsible government, proposed to his father, William Warren Baldwin, that they should assist Lafontaine's election. Baldwin senior was a candidate for a riding in the Toronto area. He withdrew his nomination to allow Lafontaine to stand for election. Lafontaine was elected. This was the beginning of the Lafontaine-Baldwin alliance which ultimately led to responsible government in the Province of Canada.

Candidates at this time were loosely affiliated in early political parties, but party structure was not strong. Different parties were active in Canada East and Canada West. The election gave no single party group a majority of seats in the Legislative Assembly.

== Governors General ==
One of the unusual features of the 1st Parliament was the high turnover in the position of governor general. Charles Poulett Thomson was the governor general from February 1841 until September 1841, when he died from tetanus resulting from a riding accident. His deputy, Major-General John Clitherow, immediately prorogued Parliament. Clitherow was replaced by the Administrator, Lieutenant-General Sir Richard Downes Jackson, shortly afterwards. Jackson acted as Administrator until January 1842, when Sir Charles Bagot was appointed Governor General. Bagot resigned the office in March, 1843 due to ill health, dying shortly afterwards. Sir Charles Metcalfe then took over, and stayed in office until November 1845. He retired to England and died of cancer shortly afterwards.

== Legislative Assembly ==
=== Canada East ===
==== Members elected in the general election ====
The following members were elected to the Legislative Assembly from Canada East in the 1841 general election. The party affiliations are based on the biographies of individual members given by the National Assembly of Quebec, as well as votes in the Legislative Assembly. "Party" was a fluid concept, especially during the early years of the Province of Canada.

Riding	Member	Party	First elected/previously elected	No. of terms
Beauharnois	Dunscomb, John William (Note: Resigned on October 8, 1842, following appointment as Warden, Trinity House, Montreal, on July 15, 1842.)	Unionist	1841	1st term
Beauharnois	Dunscomb, John William	Government supporter	1841	1st term
Beauharnois	Wakefield, Edward Gibbon (1842)	French-Canadian Group	1842	1st term
Beauharnois	Wakefield, Edward Gibbon (1842)	"British" Tory	1842	1st term
Bellechasse	Ruel, Augustin-Guillaume (Note: Resigned on being appointed Registrar of the Rimouski district, January 1, 1842.)	Anti-unionist	1841	1st term
Bellechasse	Ruel, Augustin-Guillaume	French-Canadian Group	1841	1st term
Bellechasse	Turgeon, Abraham (1842)	French-Canadian Group	1842	1st term
Berthier	Armstrong, David Morrison	Anti-unionist	1841	1st term
Berthier	Armstrong, David Morrison	French-Canadian Group	1841	1st term
Bonaventure	Hamilton, John Robinson	Anti-unionist	1832, 1841	2nd term*
Bonaventure	Hamilton, John Robinson	Independent	1832, 1841	2nd term*
Chambly	Yule, John (Note: Resigned September 22, 1843.)	Unionist	1841	1st term
Chambly	Yule, John	Government supporter	1841	1st term
Chambly	Lacoste, Louis (1843)	French-Canadian Group	1834, 1843	2nd term
Champlain	Kimber, René-Joseph (Note: Seat became vacant on his appointment to the Legislative Council.)	Anti-unionist	1841	1st term
Champlain	Kimber, René-Joseph	French-Canadian Group	1841	1st term
Champlain	Judah, Henry (1843)	French-Canadian Group	1843	1st term
Dorchester	Taschereau, Antoine-Charles	Anti-unionist	1830, 1841	3rd term
Dorchester	Taschereau, Antoine-Charles	French-Canadian Group	1830, 1841	3rd term
Drummond	Watts, Robert Nugent	Unionist	1841	1st term
Drummond	Watts, Robert Nugent	Government supporter	1841	1st term
Gaspé	Christie, Robert	Anti-unionist	1841	1st term
Gaspé	Christie, Robert	Independent	1841	1st term
Huntingdon	Cuvillier, Austin (Speaker of the Assembly)	Anti-unionist	1814, 1841	8th term*
Huntingdon	Cuvillier, Austin (Speaker of the Assembly)	Independent	1814, 1841	8th term*
Kamouraska	Berthelot, Amable	Anti-unionist	1814, 1824, 1834, (Note: Quebec (Upper Town)) 1841	4th term*
Kamouraska	Berthelot, Amable	French-Canadian Group	1814, 1824, 1834, 1841	4th term*
L'Islet	Taché, Étienne-Pascal	Anti-unionist	1841	1st term
L'Islet	Taché, Étienne-Pascal	French-Canadian Group	1841	1st term
Leinster	Raymond, Jean-Moïse (Note: Resigned on being appointed District Registrar of Leinster on January 1, 1842.)	Anti-unionist	1824, (Note: Huntingdon/Laprairie) 1841	5th term
Leinster	Raymond, Jean-Moïse	French-Canadian Group	1824, 1841	5th term
Leinster	De Witt, Jacob (1842)	French-Canadian Group	1830, (Note: Beauharnois) 1842	3rd term*
Lotbinière	Noël, Jean-Baptiste-Isaïe	Anti-unionist	1830, 1841	3rd term
Lotbinière	Noël, Jean-Baptiste-Isaïe	French-Canadian Group	1830, 1841	3rd term
Megantick	Daly, Dominick	Unionist	1841	1st term
Megantick	Daly, Dominick	Government supporter	1841	1st term
Missiskoui	Jones, Robert	Unionist	1841	1st term
Missiskoui	Jones, Robert	"British" Tory	1841	1st term
Montmorency	Quesnel, Frédéric-Auguste	Anti-unionist	1820, (Note: Kent/Chambly) 1841	5th term*
Montmorency	Quesnel, Frédéric-Auguste	French-Canadian Group	1820, 1841	5th term*
Montreal (District represented by two members)	Holmes, Benjamin (Note: Resigned on February 1, 1844, to return to position with the Bank of Montreal.)	Unionist	1841	1st term
Montreal (District represented by two members)	Holmes, Benjamin	Government supporter	1841	1st term
Montreal (District represented by two members)	Holmes, Benjamin	Independent	1841	1st term
Montreal (District represented by two members)	Holmes, Benjamin	French-Canadian Group	1841	1st term
Montreal (District represented by two members)	Moffatt, George (Note: Resigned on October 30, 1843, to protest decision to move the provincial seat of government from Kingston to Montreal.)	Unionist	1841	1st term
Montreal (District represented by two members)	Moffatt, George	Government supporter	1841	1st term
Montreal (District represented by two members)	Beaubien, Pierre (1843)	French-Canadian Group	1843	1st term
Montreal (District represented by two members)	Drummond, Lewis Thomas (1843)	French-Canadian Group	1843	1st term
Montreal County	Delisle, Alexandre-Maurice (Note: Seat automatically vacated on being appointed Clerk of the Crown for the Montreal Sessions of the Peace, July 13, 1843.)	Unionist	1841	1st term
Montreal County	Delisle, Alexandre-Maurice	Government supporter	1841	1st term
Montreal County	Jobin, André (1843)	French-Canadian Group	1835, 1843	2nd term*
Nicolet	Morin, Augustin-Norbert (Note: Appointed to the District Court for Rimouski and resigned seat on January 7, 1842.)	Anti-unionist	1830, (Note: Bellechasse) 1841	3rd term
Nicolet	Morin, Augustin-Norbert	French-Canadian Group	1830, 1841	3rd term
Nicolet	Viger, Louis-Michel (1842)	French-Canadian Group	1830, (Note: Chambly) 1842	3rd term*
Ottawa County	Day, Charles Dewey (Note: Appointed to the Queen's Bench, June 21, 1842.)	Unionist	1841	1st term
Ottawa County	Day, Charles Dewey	Government supporter	1841	1st term
Portneuf	Aylwin, Thomas Cushing (Note: Appointed Solicitor General of Canada East on September 24, 1842, triggering a ministerial by-election.)	Anti-unionist	1841	1st term
Portneuf	Aylwin, Thomas Cushing	French-Canadian Group	1841	1st term
Quebec City (District represented by two members)	Black, Henry	Unionist	1841	1st term
Quebec City (District represented by two members)	Black, Henry	"British Tory"	1841	1st term
Quebec City (District represented by two members)	Burnet, David (Note: Resigned on August 26, 1843 after declaring bankruptcy.)	Unionist	1841	1st term
Quebec City (District represented by two members)	Burnet, David	Independent	1841	1st term
Quebec City (District represented by two members)	Chabot, Jean (1843)	French-Canadian Group	1843	1st term
Quebec County	Neilson, John	Anti-unionist	1818, 1841	6th term*
Quebec County	Neilson, John	French-Canadian Group	1818, 1841	6th term*
Richelieu	Viger, Denis-Benjamin	Anti-unionist	1808, (Note: Montreal West/Leinster/Kent) 1841	10th term*
Richelieu	Viger, Denis-Benjamin	French-Canadian Group	1808, 1841	10th term*
Rimouski	Borne, Michel (Note: Resigned on December 15, 1842 to allow Robert Baldwin, who had been defeated in a ministerial by-election in Canada West, to stand for election.)	Anti-unionist	1841	1st term
Rimouski	Borne, Michel	French-Canadian Group	1841	1st term
Rimouski	Baldwin, Robert (1843)	Ultra Reformer	1829, (Note: York (town) (Upper Canada)) 1841, (Note: Hastings and 4th York (Canada West)) 1843	3rd term*
Rouville	de Salaberry, Melchior-Alphonse (Note: Seat became vacant on January 1, 1842, when de Salaberry was appointed Clerk of the Court, district of Richelieu, an office of profit under the Crown; defeated in the subsequent by-election.)	Unionist	1841	1st term
Rouville	de Salaberry, Melchior-Alphonse	Government supporter	1841	1st term
Rouville	Walker, William (1842)	"British" Tory	1842	1st term
Rouville	Franchère, Timothée (1843)	French-Canadian Group	1843	1st term
Saguenay	Parent, Étienne (Note: Resigned on October 14, 1842 to take appointment as Clerk to the Executive Council.)	Anti-unionist	1841	1st term
Saguenay	Parent, Étienne	French-Canadian Group	1841	1st term
Saguenay	Morin, Augustine-Norbert (1842)	French-Canadian Group	1830, (Note: Bellechasse) 1841, (Note: Nicolet) 1842	4th term*
Saint Hyacinthe	Boutillier, Thomas	Anti-unionist	1841	1st term
Saint Hyacinthe	Boutillier, Thomas	French-Canadian Group	1841	1st term
Saint Maurice	Turcotte, Joseph-Édouard (Note: Required to resign seat on December 6, 1841, on accepting an offices of profit under the Crown, translator of laws and later appointment as secretary to the Commission on Seigneurial Tenure; re-elected in subsequent by-election.)	Anti-unionist	1841	1st term
Saint Maurice	Turcotte, Joseph-Édouard	French-Canadian Group	1841	1st term
Shefford	Foster, Sewell	Unionist	1841	1st term
Shefford	Foster, Sewell	"British" Tory	1841	1st term
Sherbrooke	Hale, Edward	Unionist	1841	1st term
Sherbrooke	Hale, Edward	"British" Tory	1841	1st term
Sherbrooke County	Moore, John	Unionist	1834, 1841	2nd term
Sherbrooke County	Moore, John	Government supporter	1834, 1841	2nd term
Sherbrooke County	Moore, John	"British" member	1834, 1841	2nd term
Stanstead	Child, Marcus	Unionist	1829, 1834, 1841	3rd term*
Stanstead	Child, Marcus	Government supporter	1829, 1834, 1841	3rd term*
Stanstead	Child, Marcus	"British" member	1829, 1834, 1841	3rd term*
Terrebonne	McCulloch, Michael	Unionist	1841	1st term
Terrebonne	McCulloch, Michael	"British" Tory	1841	1st term
Three Rivers	Ogden, Charles Richard	Unionist	1814, 1826, 1841	8th term*
Three Rivers	Ogden, Charles Richard	Government supporter	1814, 1826, 1841	8th term*
Two Mountains	Robertson, Colin (Note: Died in office, February 4, 1842.)	Unionist	1841	1st term
Two Mountains	Robertson, Colin	Government supporter	1841	1st term
Two Mountains	Forbes, Charles John (1842)	"British" Tory	1842	1st term
Vaudreuil	Simpson, John	Unionist	1824, (Note: York) 1841	2nd term*
Vaudreuil	Simpson, John	"British" Tory	1824, 1841	2nd term*
Verchères	Desrivières, Henri (Note: Resigned on November 6, 1841, to allow James Leslie to stand as a candidate.)	Anti-unionist	1841	1st term
Verchères	Desrivières, Henri	French-Canadian Group	1841	1st term
Verchères	James Leslie (1841)	French-Canadian Group	1824, 1841	5th term*
Yamaska	Barthe, Joseph-Guillaume	Anti-unionist	1841	1st term
Yamaska	Barthe, Joseph-Guillaume	French-Canadian Group	1841	1st term

=== Canada West ===
==== Members elected in the general election ====
The following members were elected to the Legislative Assembly from Canada West in the 1841 general election.

Riding	Member	Party	First elected/previously elected	No. of terms
Brockville	Sherwood, George	Unionist	1841	1st term
Brockville	Sherwood, George	Compact Tory	1841	1st term
Bytown	Derbishire, Stewart	Unionist	1841	1st term
Bytown	Derbishire, Stewart	Moderate Reformer	1841	1st term
Carleton	Johnston, James	Unionist	1841	1st term
Carleton	Johnston, James	Compact Tory	1841	1st term
Cornwall	Chesley, Solomon Yeomans	Unionist	1841	1st term
Cornwall	Chesley, Solomon Yeomans	Compact Tory	1841	1st term
Dundas	Cook, John	Unionist	1830	4th term
Dundas	Cook, John	Reformer	1830	4th term
Durham	Williams, John Tucker	Unionist	1841	1st term
Durham	Williams, John Tucker	Reformer	1841	1st term
Durham	Williams, John Tucker	Independent	1841	1st term
Essex	Prince, John	Unionist	1836	2nd term
Essex	Prince, John	Independent	1836	2nd term
Frontenac	Smith, Sir Henry	Unionist	1841	1st term
Frontenac	Smith, Sir Henry	Tory	1841	1st term
Glengarry	Macdonald, John Sandfield	Unionist	1841	1st term
Glengarry	Macdonald, John Sandfield	Moderate Tory	1841	1st term
Glengarry	Macdonald, John Sandfield	Reformer	1841	1st term
Grenville	Crane, Samuel	Unionist	1841	1st term
Grenville	Crane, Samuel	Reformer	1841	1st term
Haldimand	Thompson, David	Unionist	1841	1st term
Haldimand	Thompson, David	Reformer	1841	1st term
Halton East	Hopkins, Caleb	Anti-unionist	1828, 1834, 1841	3rd term*
Halton East	Hopkins, Caleb	Ultra-Reformer	1828, 1834, 1841	3rd term*
Halton West	Durand, James Jr.	Anti-unionist	1834, 1841	2nd term*
Halton West	Durand, James Jr.	Ultra-Reformer	1834, 1841	2nd term*
Hamilton	MacNab, Sir Allan	Unionist	1830	4th term
Hamilton	MacNab, Sir Allan	Compact Tory	1830	4th term
Hastings	Baldwin, Robert (Note: Vacated seat September 16, 1842, on being appointed Attorney General for Canada West, an office of profit under the Crown. Defeated in the subsequent by-election in Hastings. Elected in by-election in Rimouski riding, Canada East, January 1843.)	Anti-unionist	1829, (Note: York (town)) 1841	2nd term*
Hastings	Baldwin, Robert	Ultra-Reformer	1829, 1841	2nd term*
Hastings	Murney, Edmund (1842)	Moderate Reformer	1836, 1842	2nd term*
Huron	Strachan, James McGill (Note: Strachan was originally declared the winner of the seat and participated in the early business of the Assembly, but the election was overturned for irregularities; the other candidate, William "Tiger" Dunlop, was declared the winner of the election and sat as the member until the end of the first Parliament.)	Unionist	1841	1st term
Huron	Strachan, James McGill	Moderate Tory	1841	1st term
Huron	Dunlop, William "Tiger" (1841)	Moderate Tory	1841	1st term
Kent	Woods, Joseph	Unionist	1841	1st term
Kent	Woods, Joseph	Compact Tory	1841	1st term
Kingston	Manahan, Anthony (Note: Vacated seat on June 14, 1841, on being appointed Collector of Customs for Toronto, an office of profit under the Crown.)	Moderate Reformer	1836	2nd term
Kingston	Harrison, Samuel Bealey (1841)	Moderate Reformer	1841	1st term
Lanark	Cameron, Malcolm	Unionist	1836	2nd term
Lanark	Cameron, Malcolm	Moderate Reformer	1836	2nd term
Leeds	Morris, James	Unionist	1837	2nd term
Leeds	Morris, James	Moderate Reformer	1837	2nd term
Lennox and Addington	Cartwright, John Solomon	Unionist	1836	2nd term
Lennox and Addington	Cartwright, John Solomon	Compact Tory	1836	2nd term
Lincoln North	Merritt, William Hamilton	Unionist	1832	4th term
Lincoln North	Merritt, William Hamilton	Moderate Reformer	1832	4th term
Lincoln South	Thorburn, David	Unionist	1835	3rd term
Lincoln South	Thorburn, David	Moderate Reformer	1835	3rd term
London	Killaly, Hamilton Hartley (Note: Vacated seat December 21, 1841, on being appointed Chairman of Board of Works, an office of profit under the Crown.)	Unionist	1841	1st term
London	Killaly, Hamilton Hartley	Moderate Reformer	1841	1st term
London	Lawrason, Lawrence (1844)	Compact Tory	1844	1st term
Middlesex	Parke, Thomas (Note: Vacated seat on June 7, 1841, on being appointed Surveyor-General, an office of profit under the Crown. Re-elected in a by-election on July 10, 1841.)	Unionist	1834	3rd term
Middlesex	Parke, Thomas	Moderate Reformer	1834	3rd term
Niagara	Campbell, Edward C. (Note: Campbell was originally declared the winner of the seat and sat in the Assembly for the 1841 session, but the election was overturned in 1842. The other candidate, Henry John Boulton, was declared the winner of the election and sat as the member until the end of the First Parliament.)	Unionist	1841	1st term
Niagara	Campbell, Edward C.	Moderate Tory	1841	1st term
Niagara	Boulton, Henry John (1842)	Moderate Reformer	1830, 1842	2nd term*
Norfolk	Powell, Israel Wood	Unionist	1841	1st term
Norfolk	Powell, Israel Wood	Moderate Reformer	1841	1st term
Northumberland North	Gilchrist, John	Unionist	1834, 1841	2nd term*
Northumberland North	Gilchrist, John	Moderate Reformer	1834, 1841	2nd term*
Northumberland South	Boswell, George M.J.	Unionist	1841	1st term
Northumberland South	Boswell, George M.J.	Moderate Reformer	1841	1st term
Oxford	Hincks, Francis	Anti-Unionist	1841	1st term
Oxford	Hincks, Francis	Ultra-Reformer	1841	1st term
Prescott	McDonald, Donald	Unionist	1841	1st term
Prescott	McDonald, Donald	Moderate Reformer	1841	1st term
Prince Edward	Roblin, John Philip	Unionist	1830, 1841	3rd term*
Prince Edward	Roblin, John Philip	Moderate Reformer	1830, 1841	3rd term*
Russell	Draper, William Henry (Note: Vacated seat April 10, 1843, on being appointed to the Legislative Council.)	Unionist	1836	2nd term
Russell	Draper, William Henry	Moderate Tory	1836	2nd term
Russell	Stewart, William (1843)	Moderate Tory	1843	1st term
Simcoe	Steele, Elmes Yelverton	Unionist	1841	1st term
Simcoe	Steele, Elmes Yelverton	Moderate Reformer	1841	1st term
Stormont	McLean, Alexander	Unionist	1837	2nd term
Stormont	McLean, Alexander	Moderate Tory	1837	2nd term
Toronto (District represented by two members)	Buchanan, Isaac (Note: Resigned seat January 2, 1843.)	Unionist	1841	1st term
Toronto (District represented by two members)	Buchanan, Isaac	Moderate Reformer	1841	1st term
Toronto (District represented by two members)	Dunn, John Henry	Unionist	1841	1st term
Toronto (District represented by two members)	Dunn, John Henry	Moderate Reformer	1841	1st term
Toronto (District represented by two members)	Sherwood, Henry (1843)	Moderate Tory	1836, (Note: Brockville) 1843	2nd term*
Wentworth	Smith, Harmannus	Unionist	1834, 1841	2nd term*
Wentworth	Smith, Harmannus	Moderate Reformer	1834, 1841	2nd term*
1st York	James Hervey Price	Unionist	1841	1st term
1st York	James Hervey Price	Moderate Reformer	1841	1st term
2nd York	George Duggan	Conservative	1841	1st term
3rd York	James Edward Small	Reformer	1839	2nd term
4th York	Baldwin, Robert (Note: Robert Baldwin was elected in both Hastings and 4th York; Louis Hippolyte LaFontaine was elected in a by-election in 4th York.)	Reformer	1829, (Note: York (town)) 1841	2nd term*
4th York	Louis-Hippolyte Lafontaine (1842)	Reformer	1830, (Note: Terrebonne (Lower Canada)) 1842	3rd term*

== By-Elections ==
=== By-elections and election petitions during the First Parliament ===
==== Canada East ====
The following members were elected in by-elections during the First Parliament. The party affiliations are based on the biographies of individual members given by the National Assembly of Quebec, as well as votes in the Legislative Assembly.

Riding	Members Elected in By-Elections	Reason for Vacancy	By-election date	Party
Beauharnois	Wakefield, Edward Gibbon	Incumbent resigned following appointment as Warden, Trinity House, Montreal	November 9, 1842	French-Canadian Group, then "British" Tory
Bellechasse	Turgeon, Abraham	Incumbent resigned following appointment as Registrar, district of Rimouski	June 6, 1842	French-Canadian Group
Chambly	Lacoste, Louis	Incumbent resigned seat	October 23, 1843	French-Canadian Group
Champlain	Judah, Henry	Incumbent appointed to Legislative Council	September 22, 1843	French-Canadian Group
Leinster	De Witt, Jacob	Incumbent resigned to take appointment as District Registrar of Leinster	August 8, 1842	French-Canadian Group
Montreal (1843)	Beaubien, Pierre	Incumbent resigned to protest movement of provincial seat of government from Kingston to Montreal	November 22, 1843	French-Canadian Group
Montreal (1844)	Drummond, Lewis Thomas	Incumbent resigned to return to work at Bank of Montreal	April 17, 1844	French-Canadian Group
Montreal County	Jobin, André	Seat vacated when incumbent appointed Clerk of the Crown, Montreal Sessions of the Peace, a civil service position	October 26, 1843	French-Canadian Group
Nicolet	Viger, Louis-Michel	Incumbent appointed to the bench	February 15, 1842	French-Canadian Group
Ottawa County	Papineau, Denis-Benjamin	Incumbent appointed to the bench	August 17, 1842	French-Canadian Group
Portneuf	Aylwin, Thomas Cushing	Ministerial by-election, triggered by appointment as Solicitor-General of Canada East	October 20, 1842	French Canadian group
Quebec City	Chabot, Jean	Incumbent resigned on bankruptcy	September 18, 1843	French-Canadian Group
Rimouski	Baldwin, Robert	Incumbent resigned to allow Baldwin to stand for election	January 30, 1843	Ultra Reformer
Rouville (1842)	Walker, William	Incumbent accepted office of profit under the Crown; Walker won subsequent ministerial by-election	July 7, 1842	"British" Tory
Rouville (1843)	Franchère, Timothée	Incumbent resigned due to ill-health	September 25, 1843	French-Canadian Group
Saguenay	Morin, Augustine-Norbert	Incumbent resigned to take government position	November 28, 1842	French-Canadian Group
Saint Maurice	Turcotte, Joseph-Édouard	Required to resign seat on accepting two offices of profit under the Crown; re-elected in by-election	July 8, 1842	French-Canadian Group
Two Mountains	Forbes, Charles John	Death of incumbent	April 18, 1842	"British" Tory
Verchères	James Leslie	Resignation of incumbent to allow Leslie to stand for election	December 28, 1841	French-Canadian Group

==== Canada West ====
The following members were elected in by-elections during the First Parliament, or installed as a result of election petitions challenging an election. indicated seats changed hands

Division	Member piror		Members elected		Reason for Vacancy	Date
Hastings	Baldwin, Robert	Reformer	Murney, Edmund	Tory	Acceptance of an office of profit under the Crown (ministerial by-election) - Attorney General for Upper Canada (Note: Baldwin along with LaFontaine were appointed to Executive Council on 16th September 1842 and invited to form ministry. Murney's victory led another byelection (Rimouski, Canada East) for Baldwin to enter the legislature.)	November 4, 1842
Huron	Strachan, James McGill	Tory	Dunlop, William "Tiger"	Tory	Incumbent's election overturned on election petition	August 20, 1841
Kingston	Manahan, Anthony	Reformer	Harrison, Samuel Bealey	Reformer	Acceptance of an office of profit under the Crown - Collector of Customs for Toronto	July 1, 1841
London	Killaly, Hamilton Hartley	Reformer	Killaly, Hamilton Hartley	Reformer	Acceptance of an office of profit under the Crown (ministerial by-election) - Chairman of the Board of Works, December 21, 1842	September 28, 1842
Middlesex	Parke, Thomas	Reformer	Parke, Thomas	Reformer	Acceptance of an office of profit under the Crown (ministerial by-election) - Surveyor-General, (Note: office held outside of the Executive Council) June 7, 1841	July 10, 1841
Niagara	Campbell, Edward C.	Tory	Boulton, Henry John	Reformer	Incumbent's election overturned on election petition with Boulton declared elected.	September 26, 1842
Russell	Draper, William Henry	Tory	Stewart, William	Tory	Appointment of incumbent to the Legislative Council	September 14, 1843
Toronto	Buchanan, Isaac	Reformer	Sherwood, Henry	Tory	Resignation	March 6, 1843
4th York	Baldwin, Robert	Reformer	Louis-Hippolyte Lafontaine	Reformer	Resignation of Incumbent (who was also elected in Hastings)	September 21, 1841
