= Saguenay (Province of Canada electoral district) =

Electoral district in former Province of Canada

Province of Canada electoral district

Defunct pre-Confederation electoral district
- Legislature: Legislative Assembly of the Province of Canada
- District created: 1841
- District abolished: 1854
- First contested: 1841
- Last contested: 1854

Saguenay was an electoral district of the Legislative Assembly of the Parliament of the Province of Canada, in Canada East (now Quebec). It was to the north-east of Quebec City. Saguenay was created in 1841 and was based on the previous electoral district of the same name for the Legislative Assembly of Lower Canada. It was represented by one member in the Legislative Assembly.

In 1853, the provincial Parliament redrew the electoral map. As part of the redistribution, the 1841 district of Saguenay was divided into three new districts, initially called Saguenay, Chicoutimi, and Tadousac electoral districts. Those districts were used in the general elections of 1854.

In 1855, the provincial Parliament passed further amendments to the electoral map, and re-named the new Saguenay electoral district to be the Charlevoix electoral district. There was no change to the boundaries, only to the name. At the same time, the name of the Tadousac electoral district was changed to the Saguenay electoral district, again with no change to the boundaries.

== Boundaries ==
The 1841 electoral district of Saguenay was located on the north shore of the Saint Lawrence River, north-east of Quebec City (now in the Saguenay–Lac-Saint-Jean region). It extended north and east to the provincial boundary.

The Union Act, 1840, passed by the British Parliament, merged the two provinces of Lower Canada and Upper Canada into the Province of Canada, with a single Parliament. The separate parliaments of Lower Canada and Upper Canada were abolished. The Union Act provided that the pre-existing electoral boundaries of Lower Canada and Upper Canada would continue to be used in the new Parliament, unless altered by the Union Act itself.

The Saguenay electoral district of Lower Canada was not altered by the Act, and therefore initially continued with the same boundaries which had been set by a statute of Lower Canada in 1829:

The County of Saguenay shall be bounded on the south west by the said County of Montmorency, on the north east by the north easterly boundary of the Province, on the south east by the River Saint Lawrence, including all of the Islands in the River Saint Lawrence nearest to the said County and in whole or in part fronting the same, and on the north west by the northern boundary of the Province; which County so bounded comprises part of the seigniory of Beaupré, the seigniories of Gouffre, Eboulemens, Murray Bay and Mount Murray and the Township of Settrington.

== Members of the Legislative Assembly (1841–1854) ==
Saguenay was a single-member constituency, represented by one member in the Legislative Assembly.

The following were the members of the Legislative Assembly for Saguenay. The party affiliations are based on the biographies of individual members given by the National Assembly of Quebec, as well as votes in the Legislative Assembly. "Party" was a fluid concept, especially during the early years of the Province of Canada.

Parliament	Members	Years in Office	Party
1st Parliament; 1841–1844	Étienne Parent (Note: Resigned on October 14, 1842, on appointment as Clerk of the Executive Council: Côté, Appointments and Elections, p. 59, note (43).)	1841–1842	Anti-unionist; French-Canadian Group
1st Parliament; 1841–1844	Augustin-Norbert Morin (Note: Elected in by-election, November 28, 1842: Côté, [Côté, Appointments and Elections], p. 59, note (44).)	1842–1844 (by-election)	French-Canadian Group
2nd Parliament; 1844–1847	Augustin-Norbert Morin (Note: Morin stood for election in both Saguenay and Bellechasse, as was permitted under the election law at that time. He was elected in both seats and chose to sit in the Bellechasse seat, declining the Saguenay seat, December 13, 1844: Côté, Political Appointments and Elections, p. 60, note (80).)	Declined seat	French-Canadian Group
2nd Parliament; 1844–1847	Marc-Pascal de Sales Laterrière (Note: Elected in by-election, January 14, 1845: Côté, Political Appointments and Elections, p. 60, note (81).)	1845–1847 (by-election)	French-Canadian Group
3rd Parliament; 1848–1851	Marc-Pascal de Sales Laterrière (Note: Reguired to resign seat on being appointed Deputy Adjutant General of Militia, an office of profit under the Crown, June 5, 1848; re-elected in by-election, September 5, 1848: Côté, Political Appointments and Elections, p. 61, note (115).)	1848	French-Canadian Group
3rd Parliament; 1848–1851	Marc-Pascal de Sales Laterrière	1848–1851 (by-election)	French-Canadian Group
4th Parliament; 1851–1854	Marc-Pascal de Sales Laterrière	1851–1854	French-Canadian Group

== Abolition ==
The district was abolished in 1854, when the 1853 redistribution statute came into effect. The 1841 Saguenay electoral district was split into three new electoral districts: Charlevoix, Chicoutimi, and the new Saguenay electoral district.

== See also ==
- List of elections in the Province of Canada
