= Russell (Province of Canada electoral district) =

Province of Canada electoral district

Russell Canada West
Province of Canada electoral district

Defunct pre-Confederation electoral district
- Legislature: Legislative Assembly of the Province of Canada
- District created: 1841
- District abolished: 1867
- First contested: 1841
- Last contested: 1863

Russell was an electoral district of the Legislative Assembly of the Parliament of the Province of Canada, in Canada West (now Ontario). It was created in 1841, upon the establishment of the Province of Canada by the union of Upper Canada and Lower Canada. Russell was represented by one member in the Legislative Assembly. It was abolished in 1867, upon the creation of Canada and the province of Ontario.

== Boundaries ==
Russell electoral district was based on Russell County (now part of the United Counties of Prescott and Russell). It was located east of Bytown (now Ottawa, Ontario), on the Ottawa River, which formed the border with Canada East (now the province of Quebec).

The Union Act, 1840 had merged the two provinces of Upper Canada and Lower Canada into the Province of Canada, with a single Parliament. The separate parliaments of Lower Canada and Upper Canada were abolished. The Union Act provided that the pre-existing electoral boundaries of Upper Canada would continue to be used in the new Parliament, unless altered by the Union Act itself.

Russell County had been an electoral district in the Legislative Assembly of Upper Canada, even after its merger with Prescott County, and its boundaries were not altered by the Union Act. Those boundaries had originally been set by a statute of Upper Canada in 1798:

That the townships of Clarence, Cumberland, Gloucester, Osgoode, Russell and Cambridge, with such of the Islands in the river Ottawa as are wholly or in greater part opposite thereto, shall constitute and form the County of Russell.

Since Russell was not changed by the Union Act, those boundaries continued to be used for the new electoral district. Russell was represented by one member in the Legislative Assembly.

== Members of the Legislative Assembly ==
Russell was represented by one member in the Legislative Assembly. The following were the members for Russell.

Parliament	Years	Members	Party
1st Parliament; 1841–1844	1841–1843	William Henry Draper (Note: Vacated seat on appointment to the Legislative Council of the Province of Canada, April 10, 1843.)	Unionist; Moderate Tory
1st Parliament; 1841–1844	1843–1844 (by-election)	William Stewart (Note: Elected in by-election September 14, 1843.)	Moderate Tory

== Abolition ==
Russell electoral district was abolished on July 1, 1867, when the British North America Act, 1867 came into force, creating Canada and splitting the Province of Canada into Quebec and Ontario. It was succeeded by two electoral districts named Russell, one in the House of Commons of Canada and one in the Legislative Assembly of Ontario.
