= Hastings (Province of Canada electoral district) =

Province of Canada electoral district

Hastings Canada West
Province of Canada electoral district

Defunct pre-Confederation electoral district
- Legislature: Legislative Assembly of the Province of Canada
- District created: 1841
- District abolished: 1867
- First contested: 1841
- Last contested: 1863

Hastings was an electoral district of the Legislative Assembly of the Parliament of the Province of Canada, in Canada West (now Ontario). Based on Hastings County, it fronted on the Bay of Quinte on Lake Ontario and extended north. It was created in 1841, upon the establishment of the Province of Canada by the union of Upper Canada and Lower Canada.

Hastings electoral district was represented by one member in the Legislative Assembly. It was abolished in 1867, upon the creation of Canada and the province of Ontario.

== Boundaries ==
Hastings electoral district was located on the north shore of the Bay of Quinte on Lake Ontario and extended north. It was based on Hastings County. The town of Belleville was the major centre.

The Union Act, 1840 had merged the two provinces of Upper Canada and Lower Canada into the Province of Canada, with a single Parliament. The separate parliaments of Lower Canada and Upper Canada were abolished. The Union Act provided that the pre-existing electoral boundaries of Upper Canada would continue to be used in the new Parliament, unless altered by the Union Act itself.

Hastings County had been an electoral district in the Legislative Assembly of Upper Canada. Its boundaries were not altered by the Union Act. Those boundaries had originally been set by a proclamation of the first Lieutenant Governor of Upper Canada, John Graves Simcoe, in 1792:

That the eleventh of the said counties be hereafter called by the name of the county of Hastings; which county is to be bounded on the east by the westernmost line of the county of Lenox, on the south by the Bay of Quinte, until it meets a boundary on the easternmost line of the river Trent, thence along the said river until it intersects the rear of the ninth concession, thence by a line running north sixteen degrees west until it intersects the river Ottawa or Grand river, thence descending the said river until it meets the northwesternmost boundary of the county of Addington; and the said county of Hastings to comprehend all the islands in the said bay of Quinte and river Trent nearest to the said county, in the whole or greater part fronting the same.

The boundaries had been further defined by a statute of Upper Canada in 1798:

That the townships of Sydney, Thurlow, the tract of land occupied by the Mohawks, Hungerford, Huntingdon and Rawdon, do constitute and form the County of Hastings.

In 1821, the townships of Elzever, Madoc and Marmora were added to Hastings County.

Since Hastings electoral district was not changed by the Union Act, those boundaries continued to be used for the new electoral district. Hastings was represented by one member in the Legislative Assembly.

== Members of the Legislative Assembly ==
Hastings was represented by one member in the Legislative Assembly. The following were the members for Hastings.

| Parliament | Years | Member | Party |
|---|---|---|---|
| 1st Parliament; 1841–1844 | 1841–1842 | Robert Baldwin (Note: Vacated seat September 16, 1842, on being appointed Attorney General for Canada West, an office of profit under the Crown. Defeated in the subsequent by-election, 1842.) | Anti-unionist; Ultra-Reformer |
| 1st Parliament; 1841–1844 | 1842–1844 (by-election) | Edmund Murney (Note: Defeated Baldwin in by-election in the autumn of 1842. Second by-election for the seat held November 4, 1843, which Murney also won.) | Tory (moderate) |

== Significant elections ==
Hastings was an important battleground during the first Parliament of the Province of Canada. Robert Baldwin, the leader of the Reform movement in Canada West, was elected in the general election of 1841, defeating Edmund Murney, who had represented Hastings in the last Parliament of Upper Canada.

The next year, Baldwin and his political partner from Canada East, Louis-Hippolyte Lafontaine both became members of the Executive Council, which was a significant step in the development of responsible government. However, the law at that time required that if a member of the Legislative Assembly took an office of profit under the Crown, they were required to vacate their seats and again stand for election. Baldwin did so, triggering a by-election.

The by-election for Hastings was held in November, 1842 and became a significant battle between the Reform group and the Tories. Edmund Murney was again the candidate for the Tories, and he defeated Baldwin, which was a major loss for the Reformers. Lafontaine was able to persuade the sitting member of Rimouski in Canada East to retire, opening up the Rimouski seat. Baldwin then ran in the by-election in Rimouski and was elected in January, 1843, enabling him to re-enter the house. A second by-election was held in Hastings in the fall of 1843, which Murney also won.

== Abolition ==
The district was abolished on July 1, 1867, when the British North America Act, 1867 came into force, creating Canada and splitting the Province of Canada into Quebec and Ontario. It was succeeded by electoral districts of the same name in the House of Commons of Canada and the Legislative Assembly of Ontario.
