= Thomas Parke (architect) =

Architect, journalist and politician in Upper Canada

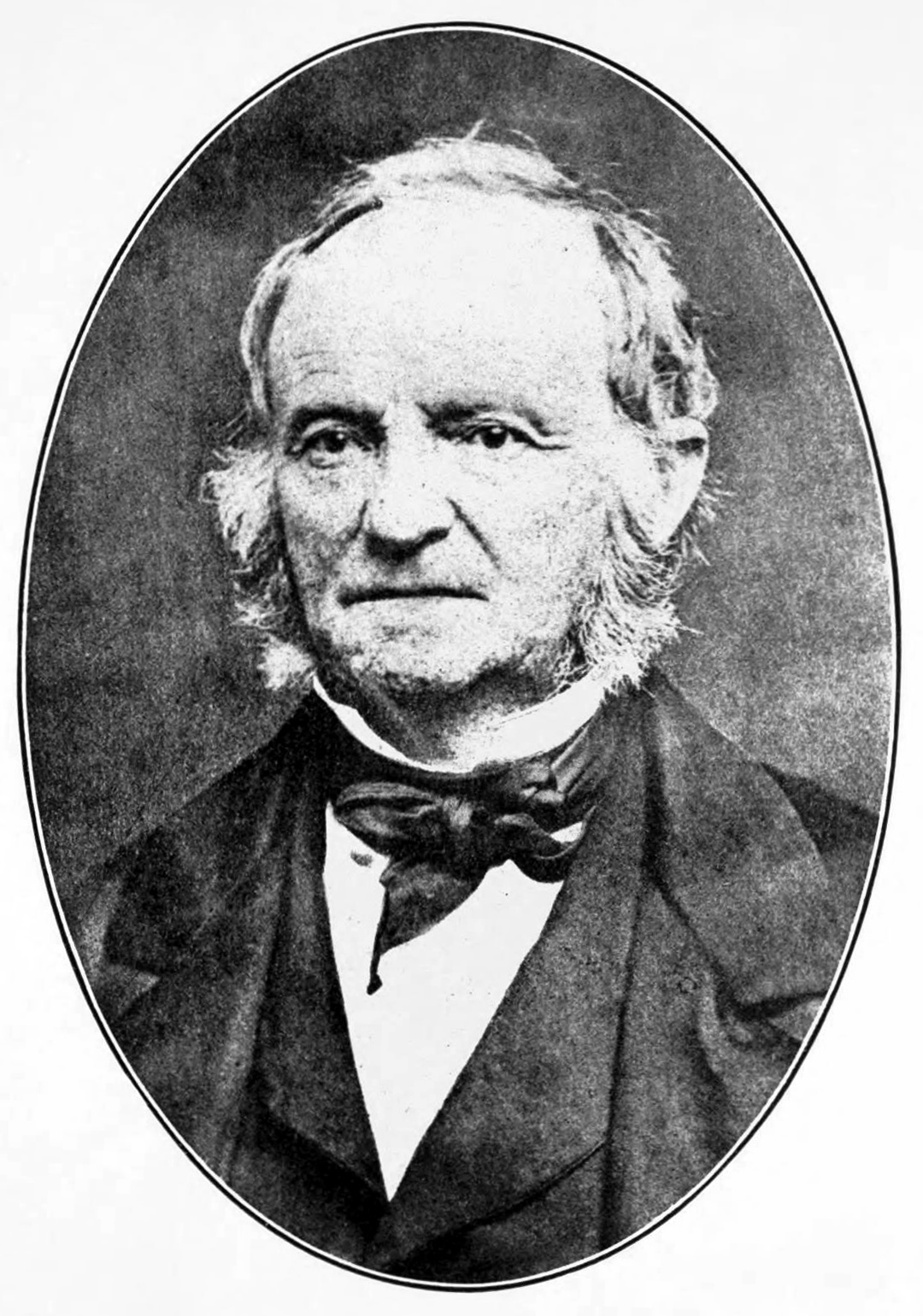

Member of the Legislative Assembly of the Province of Canada for Middlesex
- In office 1841–1844
- Preceded by: New position
- Succeeded by: Edward Ermatinger

Member of the Legislative Assembly of Upper Canada for Middlesex County
- In office 1834–1840 (with Elias Moore; two member constituency)
- Preceded by: Mahlon Burwell and Russell Mount
- Succeeded by: Position abolished

Surveyor-General for the Province of Canada
- In office 1841–1845
- Preceded by: New position
- Succeeded by: Position abolished

Personal details
- Born: 1793 County Wicklow, Ireland
- Died: January 29, 1864 (aged 70–71)
- Spouse(s): (1) Sarah (d. March 1841) (2) Harriet Rose Wilke
- Children: At least four sons, two daughters
- Profession: Engineer

Thomas Parke (1793 – January 29, 1864) was an architect, builder, journalist and political figure in Upper Canada.

He was born in County Wicklow in Ireland in 1793 and came to York, Upper Canada (now Toronto, Ontario) in 1820. He worked with John Ewart as a master carpenter on a number of construction projects, including the new parliament buildings at York, to replace the first parliament buildings, burnt by American invaders in the War of 1812.

In 1832, he moved to London, Upper Canada. He invested in property there and built a gristmill on the Thames River in 1833. He was also involved in projects to establish a railway link to the city and improve navigation on the Thames below London.

In 1834, he and Elias Moore from Yarmouth were elected to the Legislative Assembly of Upper Canada, for the two-member constituency, Middlesex County. They supported the Reform movement, which sought to increase popular control of the provincial government and reduce the influence of the oligarchic Family Compact. The pair was re-elected in 1836, in a very volatile election, a year before the Rebellion of 1837 broke out.

In 1838, he was involved with a group of Reformers, including Francis Hincks, who were unhappy with the political environment of the time. They were considering the development of a settlement in Iowa for discontented Canadians. This project did not advance much further than initial planning, although Parke did make one scouting trip to Iowa to evaluate land options.

In 1839, he was a co-founder of the Canada Inquirer, later the London Inquirer, a reform-oriented newspaper. He was appointed justice of the peace in the London District in 1840.

Parke supported the union of Upper Canada and Lower Canada. His support was credited for the passage of resolutions in support of the Union in the last sessions of the Upper Canada Legislative Assembly in 1840. In 1841, Parke was elected to the first Parliament of the Province of Canada, as a moderate Reformer. He supported the union of the Canadas and consistently supported the government of the Governor General, Lord Sydenham, in the first session of the Parliament, while supporting Robert Baldwin in subsequent sessions.

On June 7, 1841, Parke was also appointed Surveyor-General for the Province of Canada. Since that was an office of profit under the Crown, he was required to resign his seat in the Assembly. He was returned to the Assembly in subsequent by-election on July 10, 1841.

Parke stood for re-election in the general election of 1844, but came in third, splitting the Reform vote. Edward Ermatinger, the Tory candidate, won the seat.

In 1845, when the position of surveyor general was abolished, he was named customs collector at Port Colborne. He was named to the same post at Port Dalhousie (St Catharines) in 1860.

Parke was married twice, and it is not certain exactly how many children he had with his two wives. It is known that he had at least four sons, all of whom became lawyers. One son, Ephraim Jones Parke, later became a judge.

He died in St. Catharines in 1864.
