= Kingston (Province of Canada electoral district) =

Province of Canada electoral district

Kingston Canada West
Province of Canada electoral district

Defunct pre-Confederation electoral district
- Legislature: Legislative Assembly of the Province of Canada
- District created: 1841
- District abolished: 1867
- First contested: 1841
- Last contested: 1863

Kington was an electoral district of the Legislative Assembly of the Parliament of the Province of Canada, in Canada West (now Ontario). It was created in 1841, upon the establishment of the Province of Canada by the union of Upper Canada and Lower Canada. Kingston was represented by one member in the Legislative Assembly. It was abolished in 1867, upon the creation of Canada and the province of Ontario.

== Boundaries ==
Kingston electoral district was primarily centred on the town of Kingston, Canada West (now Ontario). It was located on the north shore of Lake Ontario, at the beginning of the Saint Lawrence River.

The Union Act, 1840 had merged the two provinces of Upper Canada and Lower Canada into the Province of Canada, with a single Parliament. The separate parliaments of Lower Canada and Upper Canada were abolished. The Union Act provided that the town of Kingston would constitute one electoral district in the Legislative Assembly of the new Parliament, but gave the Governor General of the Province of Canada the power to draw the boundaries for the electoral district.

The first Governor General of the Province of Canada, Lord Sydenham, issued a proclamation shortly after the formation of the Province of Canada in early 1841, establishing the boundaries for the electoral district:

The Town of Kingston, shall be bounded and limited as follows, commencing on Lake Ontario, in the limit between lots numbers twenty-four and twenty-five, in the Township of Kingston, at the south-west angle of the said lot number twenty-five; then north, one hundred and seven chains, fifty links more or less, to the northern limit of the lands granted to Magdalen Ferguson; then east, sixty-one chains, more or less, to the River Cataraqui; thence along the water's edge of the said river Cataraqui and Lake Ontario, southerly and westerly, to the place of beginning.

== Members of the Legislative Assembly ==
Kingston was represented by one member in the Legislative Assembly. The following were the members for Kingston.

Parliament	Years	Member	Party
1st Parliament; 1841–1844	1841	Anthony Manahan (Note: Resigned on June 18, 1841, following appointment as Collector of Customs, Toronto.)	Reformer
1st Parliament; 1841–1844	1841–1844; By-election	Samuel Bealey Harrison	Reformer

== Abolition ==
The electoral district was abolished on July 1, 1867, when the British North America Act, 1867 came into force, creating Canada and splitting the Province of Canada into Quebec and Ontario. It was succeeded by electoral districts of the same name in the House of Commons of Canada and the Legislative Assembly of Ontario.
