= District Councils Act (1841) =

District Councils Act 1841

Parliament of the Province of Canada
- Long title: «An Act to provide for the better internal Government of that part of this Province which formerly constituted the Province of Upper Canada, by the establishment of Local or Municipal Authorities therein»
- Citation: 4 Vict., ch. 10 (1841)
- Territorial extent: Province of Upper Canada
- Enacted by: Parliament of the Province of Canada
- Royal assent: 1841
- Commenced: January 1842

Repealed by
- Municipal Act 1845 (Canada East); Municipal Corporations Act (Baldwin Act) 1849 (Canada West)

The District Councils Act, "An Act to provide for the better internal Government of that part of this Province which formerly constituted the Province of Upper Canada, by the establishment of Local or Municipal Authorities therein", was passed by the Parliament of the Province of Canada in August 1841 and went into effect at the start of January 1842. A separate District Councils Act was also passed in 1840 in Lower Canada by the Special Council which administered the province before the passing of the Act of Union. Previously, local government in Canada East and Canada West was based on judicial bodies appointed by the Lieutenant-Governor, the Courts of Quarter Session, which were presided over by justices of the peace. The Act, proposed by Lord Sydenham, established District Councils which consisted of a warden, clerk and treasurer, who were appointed, and district councillors, who were elected.

District councils looked after roads, bridges, schools and real estate in the district, expenses associated with the administration of justice and salaries for district and township officers. Any by-laws passed by a district council were subject to review by the governor.

The District Council Act was repealed in Canada East in 1845 and replaced by a new Municipal Act which introduced elected officials at the parish and township levels. Local government institutions in Canada West were reorganized by the Municipal Corporations Act of 1849, also known as the Baldwin Act.
