= Étienne Parent =

Canadian journalist, politician and public servant (1802-1874)

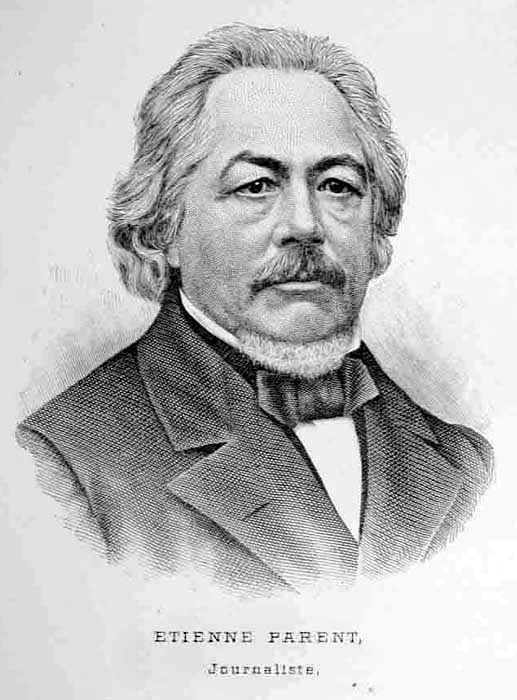
- Portrait of Étienne Parent

Member of the Legislative Assembly of the Province of Canada for Saguenay
- In office 1841–1842
- Preceded by: New position
- Succeeded by: Augustin-Norbert Morin

Clerk of the Executive Council of the Province of Canada
- In office 1842–1847

Under-Provincial Secretary, Province of Canada
- In office 1847–1868

Under-Secretary of State, Canada
- In office 1868–1873

Personal details
- Born: May 2, 1802 Parish of Notre-Dame de la Nativité, near the town of Beauport
- Died: December 22, 1874 (aged 72) Ottawa
- Spouse: Henriette-Mathilde Grenier
- Relations: Michel Clouet (uncle); Antoine Gérin-Lajoie (son-in-law); Benjamin Sulte (son-in-law)
- Children: 5 girls, 1 boy
- Education: Collège de Nicolet (1814–1819); Petit Séminaire de Québec (1819–1821)
- Occupation: Journalist, editor, civil servant, essayist and lecturer

Étienne Parent (May 2, 1802 – December 22, 1874) was a Canadian journalist, politician and government official. A French-Canadian nationalist, he wrote extensively on political theory and governance during the 1820s and 1830s in various newspapers, particularly Le Canadien, of which he was editor. He was attracted to theories of constitutional governance based on the British constitution, and opposed annexation to the United States. Born to farming parents, he spent most of his adult life in the French-Canadian political and social elites.

Parent opposed the Lower Canada Rebellion in 1837, condemning the inevitable bloodshed, while also heavily attacking the colonial government for its military repression of Lower Canada's claims for self-government. As a result, he was condemned as a traitor by the advocates of the Rebellion, and imprisoned by the colonial government for "seditious schemings".

An initial opponent of the union of Lower Canada and Upper Canada into the Province of Canada, he gradually concluded that it opened the possibility for a system of responsible government through an alliance between reformers in Lower Canada and Upper Canada. His writings influenced Louis-Hippolyte LaFontaine, who ultimately achieved responsible government, working in partnership with Robert Baldwin, leader of the Reformers from Upper Canada.

Parent was briefly a member of the Legislative Assembly of the Province of Canada, but with increasing deafness, he resigned his seat. LaFontaine appointed him as Clerk of the Executive Council, the provincial Cabinet. Parent became a public servant for the rest of his life, while providing a series of lectures on social and economic issues at the Institut canadien de Montréal and the Institut canadien de Québec. After Confederation in 1867, he continued as a federal public servant until his retirement.

== Family and early life ==
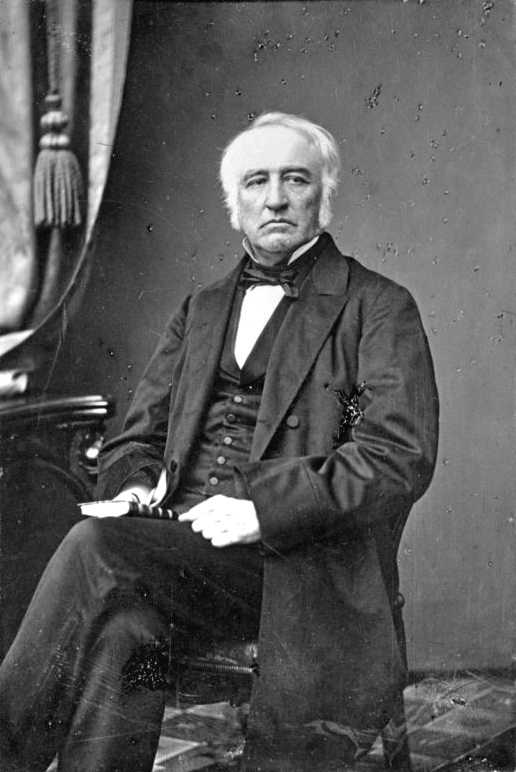
Augustin-Norbert Morin: Parent's classmate, political colleague, and eventual opponent in the Lower Canada Rebellion

Parent was born in the parish of Notre-Dame de la Nativité, near the town of Beauport (now part of Quebec City), in 1802. His parents were a farm couple: Étienne-François Parent and Josephte Clouet. He was the eldest of a large family of nine boys and six girls, and grew up working on the farm, acquiring habits of hard work and determination. His parents sent him to a primary school in Quebec, and then in 1814, when he was 12 years old, to the Collège de Nicolet for secondary schooling. He did well at school, winning several prizes. Five years later, in 1819, his parents sent him to the Petit Séminaire de Québec for further studies. Parent again did well, reading as many books as he could, and distinguishing himself for his writing abilities and good judgment.

While he was at the Petit Séminaire, he met Augustin-Norbert Morin, a fellow student. Morin was already writing articles for Le Canadien, a newspaper which supported the nationalist political group, the Parti canadien. Morin encouraged Parent to submit articles to the newspaper as well, starting his career as a journalist before he was out of school. However, the seminary authorities forbade him from submitting further articles.

Parent left the Petit Séminaire in 1821, before taking his final examinations. The reason is not known. His family found him a job with his uncle, Michel Clouet, who ran a hardware store in Quebec and was a member of the Legislative Assembly of Lower Canada. Parent worked there for a while, then returned to work on the family farm. While there, he was visited by François Blanchet, the publisher of Le Canadien, and Flavien Vallerand, the editor. Morin, who had been working at the paper, had relocated to Montreal for his studies in law. They offered Parent the post of editor. Parent accepted. For the rest of his life, Parent lived and worked with the French-Canadian political and social elites.

== Journalism and politics ==
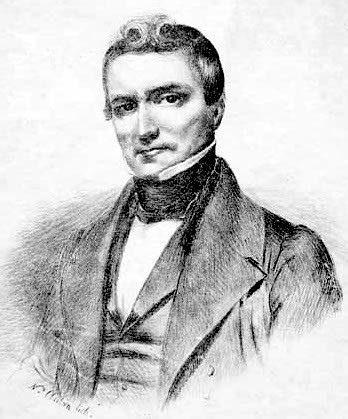
Louis-Joseph Papineau, leader of the Parti patriote, Parent's political colleague and eventual opponent during the Lower Canada Rebellion

At age 20, Parent became the editor and primary writer for Le Canadien, which supported the Parti canadien in its political battles with the governor. He wrote on the issues of the day, but also more generally, on questions of constitutionalism and governance. As editor, he also supported French Canadian journalism and writing. He was a strong supporter of the Lower Canada constitution, set out in the Constitutional Act, 1791, and condemned breaches of political liberties.

He also was a strong opponent of the proposal to reunite Lower Canada with Upper Canada, which the British government was considering in 1822. His writings provided intellectual rigour to the political arguments being made by leaders of the Parti canadien, such as Louis-Joseph Papineau and John Neilson. Ultimately, the British government withdrew the proposed reunification bill.

In 1825, Le Canadien folded, and Parent began looking for other work. He held down a number of positions, including working for the former rival paper, La Gazette de Québec, From 1825 to 1829 he studied law as a student in the office of Joseph-Rémi Vallières de Saint-Réal, and later in that of Charles-Eusèbe Casgrain. He was called to the bar of Lower Canada in 1829, but never practised law. He also obtained positions as a French translator and law officer for the Legislative Assembly of Lower Canada. He later became the Assembly's librarian, and then the Clerk of the Assembly.

During the turbulent politics of the 1830s, Parent was heavily involved in journalism in support of the Parti patriote, as the Parti canadien came to be known. In 1831, he managed to revive Le Canadien for the third time, and became the editor and leading writer. He chose "Notre langue, nos institutions, nos lois" ("Our language, our institutions, our laws") as the masthead motto, which summarised his own personal ideology.

In 1834, the Legislative Assembly, led by Papineau and Morin, passed the Ninety-Two Resolutions, by an overwhelming majority. The Resolutions set out the grievances of French-Canadians, critiquing the powers of the governor and the unelected Legislative Council. Although Parent was not involved in drafting the Ninety-Two Resolutions, many of his ideas from his articles in Le Canadien found their way into the Resolutions.

Parent wrote numerous articles in Le Canadien defending the Resolutions, and responding to criticisms of the Resolutions in the English-language newspapers in Lower Canada. He defended the changes proposed by the Resolutions, such as an elected Legislative Council and control of public finance by the Assembly, as being consistent with British parliamentary government. In Parent's view, the people of Lower Canada, as British subjects, had the right to criticise their government and propose reforms, designed to achieve local self-government while maintaining the link to Britain. Another journalist, Joseph-Guillaume Barthe, summed up Parent's role at this time: "Parent is to journalism what Papineau is to the parliamentary tribune."

Parent and Papineau did not always agree on goals and tactics. In the run-up to the general elections of 1834, Papineau was trying to lead the Patriotes to a more radical nationalist position. Parent, influential particularly in Quebec and surrounding areas, urged moderation.

== Lower Canada Rebellion ==
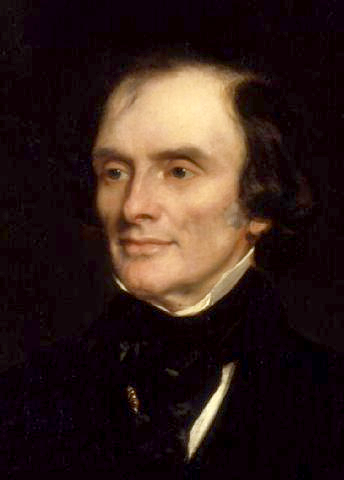
Lord John Russell, the British Home Secretary who rejected the Ninety-Two Resolutions

In 1837, the British government rejected the Ninety-Two Resolutions. The Home Secretary, Lord John Russell, proposed ten resolutions in response, which were issued and adopted by the British House of Commons. The Russell Resolutions affirmed the power of the governor, as representative of the British government, to control the government and public finances of Lower Canada. The Russell Resolutions created a political firestorm in Lower Canada. Papineau and his supporters began to agitate to challenge the British colonial government, including a series of large-scale public rallies. There was a riot in Montreal between two armed groups, the French-Canadian Fils de la Liberté and the Doric Club, a British loyalist group. Rebellion was in the air.

Parent broke with Papineau and Morin at this point. Although he was one of the first to strongly criticise the position of the British government and the Russell Resolutions, Parent was committed to the constitutional structure set out in the Constitutional Act 1791. He argued that the British government had broken the framework of 1791. However, Parent equally rejected the tendency towards republicanism and revolution, which he saw in his former colleagues, because that would lead to civil war. He continued to argue for moderation and reliance on legal and constitutional principles, and predicted that the force of arms would fail. He considered that remaining within the British Empire, and adapting British constitutional principles to the local situation, would give Lower Canada the best chance to develop into a mature political society. Rebellion would lead to the loss of the local parliamentary institutions, rights and freedoms, and a return to an oligarchic council, as had been the case under the Quebec Act, 1774. He rejected arguments for annexation by the United States.

He also foresaw the inevitable bloodshed which rebellion would cause:

We in no way wish to share the terrible responsibility assumed today by our former brothers in arms and their partisans: we impute to them the blame for all the blood that will be shed . . . against them alone must rise the wailings of widows, mothers, and orphans, and the lamentations of a whole people brought to social abasement.

In 1837, Morin and Parent, the two former school-fellows, engaged in a battle of political persuasion in the Quebec area. In a significant editorial published on November 13, 1837, Parent summed up his position: "Nous sommes des Réformistes, nous cessons d'être des Révolutionnaires." (Note: "We are Reformers, we cease to be Revolutionaries.") Morin worked to build up the Patriotes in the Quebec area, while Parent continually urged moderation and attacked the trend towards violence. Parent's writings proved influential in Quebec, the seat of government. On December 4, 1837, Quebec residents issued a public address affirming "... leurs sentiments de loyauté envers Sa Majesté, et d'attachment à la liaison de cette colonie avec le Royaume d'Angleterre et d'Irlande." (Note: "... their sentiments of loyalty towards Her Majesty, and their attachment to the connection of this colony with the Kingdom of England and Ireland" [sic]) Morin failed in his attempt to create a group of Fils de la Liberté in the Quebec area. In a letter to a supporter in Montreal, Morin commented on the need to unmask "some formerly presumed friends", a reference to Parent.

When the Lower Canada Rebellion broke out in late 1837, Parent was horror-stricken. However, while Parent condemned the Rebellion, he equally fell upon the excesses of the British colonial government, and the oligarchic British colonists, whom he blamed for consistently blocking the legitimate political aspirations of French-Canadians. In 1838 he wrote that Lower Canada had only "the name and shadow of a constitutional government", and began to argue for the establishment of responsible government as the solution to the constitutional impasse. He pleaded the cause of the Patriotes who had been exiled, and the twelve who had been condemned to death.

After the second outbreak of rebellion in late 1838 was suppressed by the British military, he wrote in December 1838:

The groans of the oppressed awaken remorse in the hearts of the oppressors, and bring a blush to their faces. ... We should like to spare England the unenviable honour of seeing its name associated with that of Russia, the "executioner of Poland." There is all our crime. It is a great crime, we admit, in the eyes of all those who are plotting the annihilation of the Canadien people.

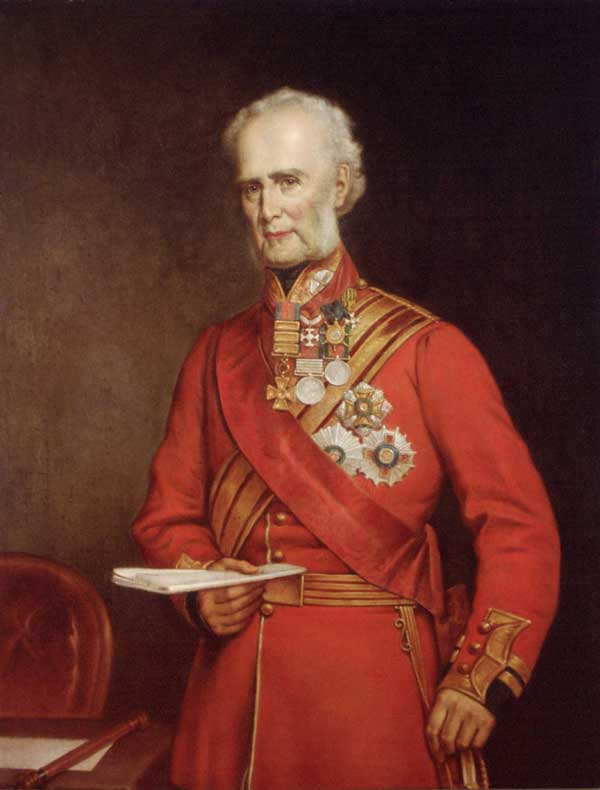
Governor General Colborne, who had Parent arrested

The net result was that Parent was condemned by both sides. The Permanent Central Committee of the Patriotes, based in Montreal, proclaimed that he was a "traitor to the nation". La Minerve, a newspaper which supported the Patriotes, published the proclamation.

At the same time, the colonial government viewed him with suspicion. In December 1838, following his harsh criticisms of the British repression of the rebellion, he was arrested by the colonial government and imprisoned on grounds of "seditious schemings", based on his articles in Le Canadien. Held without charges, he nonetheless found a means to continue to publish his views in Le Canadien: a messenger from the journal, Stanislas Drapeau, would bring him a fake pie, containing newspaper clippings and news, and Parent would send drafts of articles back by the same means. Conditions in the prison were harsh, and Parent developed deafness, which would last for the rest of his life. He was finally released in April 1839, by means of a writ of habeas corpus, in a demoralised state.

== Province of Canada ==
=== Reaction to the union ===
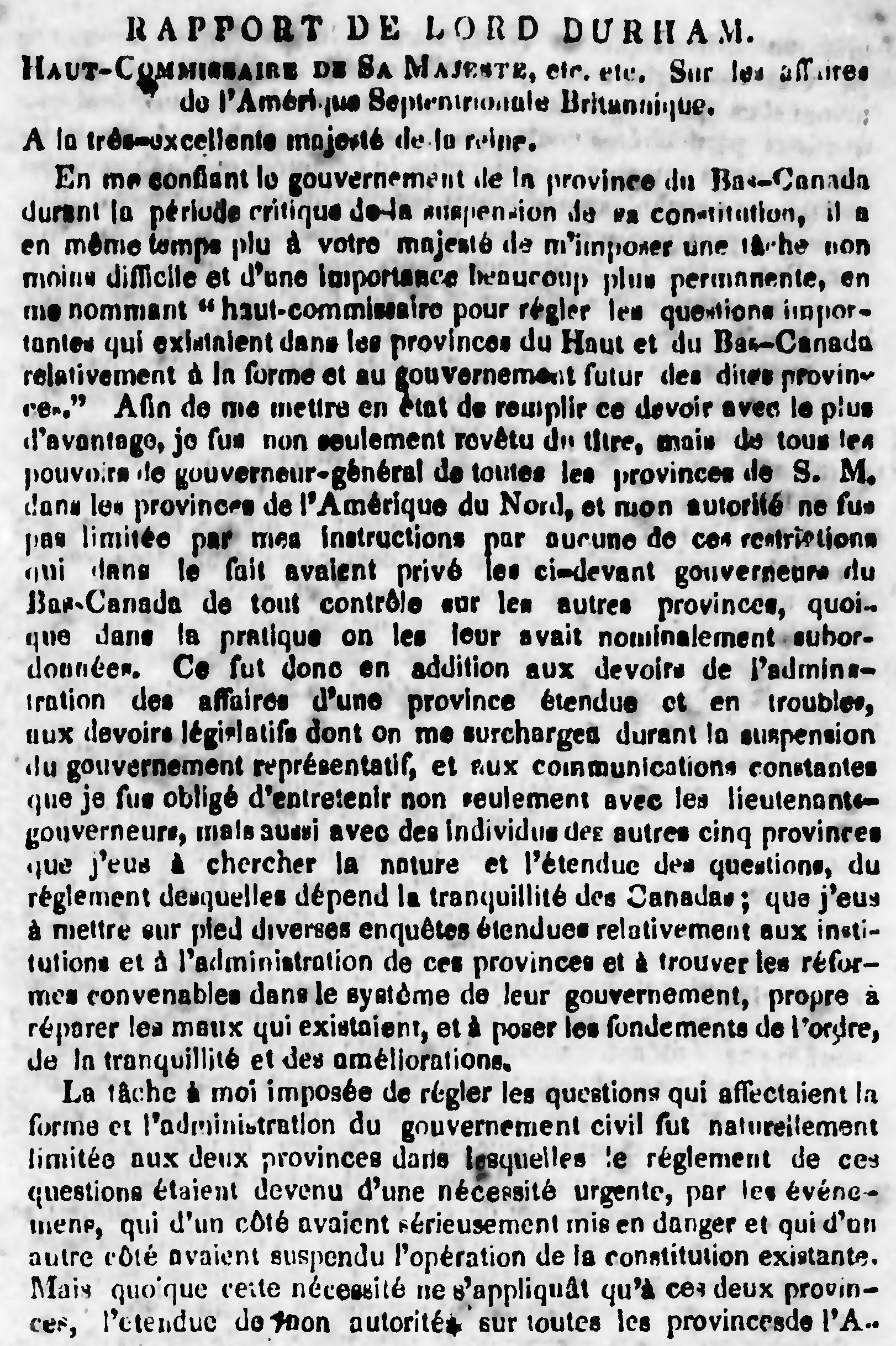
French translation of the Durham Report

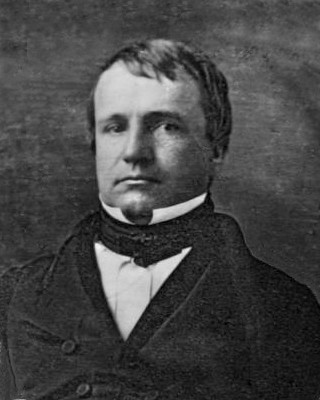
Louis Hippolyte LaFontaine, who was influenced by Parent's advocacy for responsible government

Following the rebellion in Lower Canada, and the similar rebellion in 1837 in Upper Canada (now Ontario), the British government decided to merge the two provinces into a single province, as recommended by Lord Durham in the Durham Report, issued in February 1839. The Union Act, 1840, passed by the British Parliament, abolished the two provinces and their separate parliaments. It created the Province of Canada, with a single Parliament for the entire province, composed of an elected Legislative Assembly and an appointed Legislative Council. The Governor General retained a strong position in the government.

Parent was initially disillusioned by the decision of the British government. He translated the Durham Report into French and published it in Le Canadien. He was strongly critical of it, because Durham's premise was that French-Canadians should be assimilated. He feared that the powers of assimilation might overcome the French-Canadian identity: "L'assimilation, sous le nouvel état des choses, se fera graduellement et sans secousse, et sera d'autant plus prompte qu'on laissera à son cours naturel". (Note: "Assimilation, under the new state of affairs, will occur gradually and without commotion, and will be more prompt than if we follow our natural course.") Parent was a leader of a group that collected close to 40,000 signatures on a petition opposing the union.

However, he gradually began to consider that the union offered an opportunity for an alliance between reformers from Lower Canada and Upper Canada to achieve responsible government. In his view, the principles of British parliamentarianism, if applied to the new union, would give French-Canadians the opportunity for self-government and survival. He rejected calls for annexation to the United States as a solution, as he believed that would lead to the disappearance of French-Canadians as a separate people and culture. His writings on this topic influenced Louis-Hippolyte LaFontaine, who in August 1840, issued his "Address to the Electors of Terrebonne", calling for an alliance between reformers in Lower Canada and Upper Canada to achieve responsible government. Parent published LaFontaine's address a few days later in Le Canadien. In October 1840, Parent published an "Address to the electors of the whole province", coming out in favour of union as a means to achieve responsible government.

=== First Parliament ===
The union came into force on February 10, 1841, and general elections were held in the spring of that year for the first Parliament of the new Province of Canada. Parent stood for election to the Legislative Assembly for the constituency of Saguenay. Campaigning against the union, and as a supporter of LaFontaine, he was elected by a three-vote majority. When LaFontaine was elected to a seat in Canada West, with the support of Robert Baldwin, Parent wrote in Le Canadien about the strong support Reformers in Canada West were giving to French-Canadians: "Ils élisent M. Lafontaine pour montrer, disent-ils, leur sympathie envers les Bas-Canadiens, et leur détestation des mauvais traitements et des injustices auxquelles nous avons été exposés." (Note: "They elect M. Lafontaine to show, they say, their sympathy towards Lower Canadians, and their detestation of the bad treatment and injustices to which we have been exposed.")

In the first session of the new Parliament, Parent was part of the French-Canadian Group. Working closely with LaFontaine, he voted in favour of a motion condemning the union of the two provinces, and was a consistent opponent of the policies of Governor General Lord Sydenham. He also introduced a bill calling on French to be given equal status in the Assembly, with the goal of overriding the provision of the Union Act, 1840 which provided that only English was to be used. The bill did not pass at that time.

However, Parent's deafness was getting worse, making it difficult for him to participate in the business of the Assembly. Before the second session of the Assembly began in 1842, LaFontaine, now a member of the Executive Council (the provincial Cabinet), arranged for Parent to be appointed Clerk of the Council. As that position was a non-partisan public service post, Parent resigned his seat in the Assembly, as well as his editorship of Le Canadien. In his farewell message to his readers, Parent praised the political developments under the union, with French-Canadians being leading members of the Cabinet: "... l'heureuse révolution qui a succédé à nos malheurs." (Note: "... the happy revolution which has succeeded to our misfortunes.") His successor as the member for Saguenay was Morin, elected in a by-election.

== Public servant and lecturer ==
On his appointment as clerk to the Executive Council, Parent gave up his role with Le Canadien, ending his journalism career. However, from 1846 onwards, Parent lectured frequently at the Institut canadien de Montréal and the Institut canadien de Québec, and continued writing on questions of politics, governance, and social and economic development. He was critical of the conservatism of French-Canadian society, and urged movement away from the traditional emphasis on the church, farming, and the professions. Instead, he argued for social and governmental changes to enable French-Canadians to enter into the modern spheres of commerce and industry. He was a strong supporter of universal education, which he considered necessary for economic advancement of French-Canadians. In the absence of a university for French-Canadians, the two Instituts canadiens fulfilled an important educational role for the developing francophone professional class, different from the traditional classical education.

In 1847, Parent was named the assistant secretary of the Province of Canada for Canada East, a public servant position. He held that post for twenty years. Upon Confederation in 1867, he was named under-secretary of State in the new federal government, acting as public service deputy to the Secretary of State for Canada. He held that position until his retirement in 1872.

== Marriage and family ==
In June 1829, after being called to the bar, Parent married Henriette-Mathilde Grenier, daughter of a cooper from Notre-Dame de la Nativité. The couple had six children: five daughters and one son. Three of their daughters married men who were journalists, writers, and public servants, the same intellectual milieu as their father: Joséphine-Henriette married Antoine Gérin-Lajoie, Mathilde-Sabine married Évariste Gélinas, and Augustine married Benjamin Sulte, a future president of the Royal Society of Canada.

== Later life and death ==
Parent lived for two years after his retirement. He was a regular church-goer, but according to his son-in-law Sulte, he apparently was concerned by an inherent personal scepticism. His deafness became increasingly severe, and cataracts brought him almost to blindness. In his last few weeks, he spoke incessantly about the Rebellion, and his time in prison.

Parent died in 1874 in Ottawa.

== Legacy ==
External videos
- "Étienne Parent" – Historica Canada. - Heritage Minutes (1:01 min)

Parent was the leading intellectual for the Parti patriote, up to the point of the Rebellion. His ideas provided the intellectual framework for the political positions taken by Papineau, Morin, and others during the 1830s, and found their way into the Ninety-Two Resolutions. After the Rebellion, his advocacy for responsible government in response to the union was adopted by LaFontaine. Parent in turn gave general support for LaFontaine's proposal for a political partnership with the reformers of Upper Canada, led by Baldwin. Overall, through his writings he contributed to the political and social defence of French-Canadian identity at a time when it was greatly threatened.

In addition to his political writings, Parent was an intellectual and a man of letters, who helped develop a body of French-Canadian literature. His subsequent career as a lecturer helped develop a platform for economic and social advancement for French-Canadians. A recent history of sociology in Quebec has concluded that Parent was the first Quebec sociologist.

In 1974, the centennial of his death, the federal government designated Parent as a National Historic Person:

An intellectual associated with the Parti patriote, he advocated for responsible government, but pleaded for moderation and denounced the violence of the Rebellions of 1837–1838. Later, as a lecturer and senior official, he promoted the study of political economy as a means of advancing the development of the French-Canadian nation.

There has been some controversy over the role of Parent and other reformers of his period. One Quebec historian, Éric Bédard, has noted that in recent decades, Parent and other reformers have been characterised by some Quebec historians as servile collaborators with the British Empire, and as "parvenus", who broke with the Patriote movement of Papineau. Bédard takes the position that it is time to re-examine that approach, and to consider their role as reform successors to the Patriotes, seeking to find a way to improve the social and economic lives of French-Canadians. He rejects the idea that Reformers like Parent were sell-outs to the British government, but rather were opponents to the British colonial structure, committed to finding a way to implement the principles set out in the Ninety-Two Resolutions after the failure of the Rebellion.

== Works ==
=== Collected writings ===
- Gérard Bergeron (ed.), Lire Étienne Parent (1802-1874): Notre premier intellectuel (Quebec: Presses de l'Université du Québec, 1994), a collection of Parent's writings.
- Étienne Parent (1802-1874), Textes choisis et présentés par Paul-Eugène Gosselin; digitized by Marcelle Bergeron for Les Classiques des sciences sociales

=== Public lectures (selection) ===
- "La presse" (1844)
- "L’Industrie considérée comme moyen de conserver notre nationalité" (January 22, 1846)
- "Importance de l'étude de l'économie politique" (November 19, 1846)
- "Du travail chez l'homme" (September 23, 1847)
- "Considérations sur notre système d'éducation populaire, sur l'éducation en général et les moyens législatifs d'y pourvoir" (February 19, 1848)
- "Du prêtre et du spiritualisme dans leurs rapports avec la société" (December 17, 1848)
- "De l'intelligence dans ses rapports avec la société" (January 22, 1852)
- "Quelques considérations sur le sort des classes ouvrières" (April 15, 1852)
- "De l'importance et des devoirs du commerce" (1852)
