= Middlesex (Province of Canada electoral district) =

Province of Canada electoral district

Middlesex Canada West
Province of Canada electoral district

Defunct pre-Confederation electoral district
- Legislature: Legislative Assembly of the Province of Canada
- District created: 1841
- District abolished: 1867
- First contested: 1841
- Last contested: 1863

Middlesex was an electoral district of the Legislative Assembly of the Parliament of the Province of Canada, in Canada West (now Ontario). It was created in 1841, upon the establishment of the Province of Canada by the union of Upper Canada and Lower Canada. Middlesex was represented by one member in the Legislative Assembly. It was abolished in 1867, upon the creation of Canada and the province of Ontario, and succeeded by three different ridings for both the federal Parliament and the Ontario Legislative Assembly.

== Boundaries ==
Middlesex electoral district was located on the Ontario peninsula, based on Middlesex County. The town of London was the major centre, although it was a separate electoral district, surrounded by Middlesex.

The Union Act, 1840 had merged the two provinces of Upper Canada and Lower Canada into the Province of Canada, with a single Parliament. The separate parliaments of Lower Canada and Upper Canada were abolished. The Union Act provided that the pre-existing electoral boundaries of Upper Canada would continue to be used in the new Parliament, unless altered by the Union Act itself.

Middlesex County had been an electoral district in the Legislative Assembly of Upper Canada. Its boundaries were not altered by the Union Act. Those boundaries had originally been set by a proclamation of the first Lieutenant Governor of Upper Canada, John Graves Simcoe, in 1792, under the name of the County of Suffolk:

That the seventeenth of the said counties be hereafter called by the name of the county of Suffolk; which county is to be bounded on the east by the county of Norfolk, on the south by lake Erie, until it meets the carrying-place from point au Pins unto the Thames, on the west by the said carrying-place, thence up the said river Thames until it meets the northwesternmost boundary of the county of Norfolk.

The boundaries had been further defined by a statute of Upper Canada in 1798, which renamed Suffolk county to be Middlesex county:

36. And be it further enacted by the authority aforesaid, That the townships of London, Westminster, Dorchester, Yarmouth, Southwold, Dunwich, Aldborough and Delaware, do constitute and form the County of Middlesex.

Since Middlesex was not changed by the Union Act, those boundaries continued to be used for the new electoral district.

== Members of the Legislative Assembly ==
Middlesex was represented by one member in the Legislative Assembly. The following were the members for Middlesex.

Parliament	Years	Members	Party
1st Parliament; 1841–1844	1841	Thomas Parke (Note: On June 7, 1841, Parke was appointed Surveyor-General, an office of profit under the Crown, and therefore had to resign his seat. He was re-elected in a by-election on July 10, 1841.)	Unionist; moderate Reformer
1st Parliament; 1841–1844	1841–1844	Thomas Parke	Unionist; moderate Reformer

== Abolition ==
Middlesex electoral district was abolished on July 1, 1867, when the British North America Act, 1867 came into force, creating Canada and splitting the Province of Canada into Quebec and Ontario. It was succeeded by three electoral districts in both the House of Commons of Canada and the Legislative Assembly of Ontario.
