= Montmorency (Province of Canada electoral district) =

Electoral district in former Province of Canada

Province of Canada electoral district

Defunct pre-Confederation electoral district
- Legislature: Legislative Assembly of the Province of Canada
- District created: 1841
- District abolished: 1867
- First contested: 1841
- Last contested: 1863

Montmorency was an electoral district of the Legislative Assembly of the Parliament of the Province of Canada, in Canada East, near Quebec City. It was created in 1841 by the merger of two electoral districts from the former Legislative Assembly of Lower Canada, Montmorency and Orleans. It was represented by one member in the Legislative Assembly.

The electoral district was abolished in 1867, upon the creation of Canada and the province of Quebec.

== Boundaries ==
The Union Act, 1840 merged the two provinces of Upper Canada and Lower Canada into the Province of Canada, with a single Parliament. The separate parliaments of Lower Canada and Upper Canada were abolished.

The Union Act provided that while many of the pre-existing electoral boundaries of Lower Canada and Upper Canada would continue to be used in the new Parliament, some electoral districts would be defined directly by the Union Act itself. Montmorency was one of those new electoral districts. The Union Act merged the previous electoral districts of the Montmorency and Orleans, to create a new district, also called Montmorency.

The former district of Montmorency had been defined by the 1829 boundaries as follows:

The County of Montmorency shall be bounded on the south west by the said County of Quebec, on the north east by a line to be run from Cap de l'Abatis on the River Saint Lawrence on a course north westward parallel to the said boundary line of Beauport to the northern boundary of the Province, on the north west by the said northern boundary of the Province, and on the south east by the River Saint Lawrence; comprehending the Parishes of Saint Féréol, Saint Joachim, Sainte Anne, Château Richer and l'Ange Garden.

The former district of Orleans had been defined as follows:

The County of Orleans shall comprehend the whole of the Island of Orleans, together with all the Islands nearest to the said County, and in whole fronting the same; comprehending the Parishes of Saint Pierre, Saint Jean, Sainte Famille, Saint Laurent, and Saint François and the Islands of Madame and Reaux.

The merger of the two districts resulted in the new electoral district of Montmorency stretching from the island of Orleans in the Saint Lawrence to the north-east of Quebec City (now in the Capitale-Nationale région).

== Members of the Legislative Assembly ==
Montmorency was a single-member constituency.

The following were the members of the Legislative Assembly from Montmorency. "Party" was a fluid concept, especially during the early years of the Province of Canada. Party affiliations are based on the biographies of individual members given by the National Assembly of Quebec, as well as votes in the Legislative Assembly.

Parliament	Member	Years in Office	Party
1st Parliament; 1841–1844	Frédéric-Auguste Quesnel	1841–1844	Anti-unionist; Group Canadien-français

== Abolition ==
The district was abolished on July 1, 1867, when the British North America Act, 1867 came into force, splitting the Province of Canada into Quebec and Ontario. It was succeeded by electoral districts of the same name in the House of Commons of Canada and the Legislative Assembly of Quebec.
