= Kent (Province of Canada electoral district) =

Province of Canada electoral district

Kent Canada West
Province of Canada electoral district

Defunct pre-Confederation electoral district
- Legislature: Legislative Assembly of the Province of Canada
- District created: 1841
- District abolished: 1867
- First contested: 1841
- Last contested: 1863

Kent was an electoral district of the Legislative Assembly of the Parliament of the Province of Canada, in Canada West (now Ontario). It was created in 1841, upon the establishment of the Province of Canada by the union of Upper Canada and Lower Canada. Kent was represented by one member in the Legislative Assembly. It was abolished in 1867, upon the creation of Canada and the province of Ontario.

== Boundaries ==
Kent electoral district was located on the Ontario Peninsula between Lake Erie and Lake St. Clair. It was based on the former Kent County (now the single-tier municipality of Chatham-Kent).

The Union Act, 1840 had merged the two provinces of Upper Canada and Lower Canada into the Province of Canada, with a single Parliament. The separate parliaments of Lower Canada and Upper Canada were abolished. The Union Act provided that the pre-existing electoral boundaries of Upper Canada would continue to be used in the new Parliament, unless altered by the Union Act itself.

Kent County had been an electoral district in the Legislative Assembly of Upper Canada, and those boundaries were not altered by the Union Act. Kent County had initially been defined in 1792 by a proclamation of the first Lieutenant Governor of Upper Canada, John Graves Simcoe. It then included all land that was not part of any other county, other than land occupied by First Nations, "...to the utmost extent of the country commonly called or known by the name of Canada."

Kent county was given a more clearly defined set of boundaries by a statute of Upper Canada in 1798:

That the townships of Dover, Chatham, Camden, distinguished by being called Camden West, the Moravian tract of land, called Orford, distinguished by Orford North and South, Howard, Harwich, Raleigh, Romney, Tilbury, divided into east and west, with the township on the river Sinclair, occupied by the Shawney Indians, together with the Islands in the Lakes Erie and Sinclair wholly or in greater part opposite thereto, do constitute and form the County of Kent.

Since Kent was not changed by the Union Act, those boundaries continued to be used for the new electoral district.

== Members of the Legislative Assembly ==
Kent was represented by one member in the Legislative Assembly. The following were the members for Kent.

Parliament	Years	Member	Party
1st Parliament; 1841–1844	1841–1844	Joseph Woods	Compact Tory

== Significant elections ==
In the first general election in 1841, the returning officer declined to make a return declaring a candidate elected. The contest was between Joseph Woods, a Compact Tory, and Samuel Harrison, one of the leaders of the Reform movement. At the close of the six days of open voting, Woods led the poll by forty-nine votes and was declared elected by the returning officer from the husting. Harrison and his supporters then demanded that the returning officer conduct a scrutiny, arguing that Harrison had the majority of legal voters. Woods refused to participate in the proposed scrutiny, and instead brought a petition in the Assembly on June 10, 1841, the opening day of the session, challenging the returning officer's failure to make a return of the writ. On June 17, 1841, the Assembly reviewed the petition and concluded that Woods should be seated.

== Abolition ==
The district was abolished on July 1, 1867, when the British North America Act, 1867 came into force, creating Canada and splitting the Province of Canada into Quebec and Ontario. It was succeeded by electoral districts of the same name in the House of Commons of Canada and the Legislative Assembly of Ontario.
