= Hamilton (Province of Canada electoral district) =

Province of Canada electoral district

Hamilton Canada West
Province of Canada electoral district

Defunct pre-Confederation electoral district
- Legislature: Legislative Assembly of the Province of Canada
- District created: 1841
- District abolished: 1867
- First contested: 1841
- Last contested: 1863

Hamilton was an electoral district of the Legislative Assembly of the Parliament of the Province of Canada, in Canada West, based on the town of Hamilton. It was created in 1841, upon the establishment of the Province of Canada by the union of Upper Canada and Lower Canada. Hamilton was represented by one member in the Legislative Assembly. It was abolished in 1867, upon the creation of Canada and the province of Ontario.

== Boundaries ==
Hamilton electoral district was based largely on the municipal boundaries of the town of Hamilton, located at the western end of Lake Ontario in the central area of Canada West (now the province of Ontario). Hamilton was the major centre of the electoral district.

The Union Act, 1840 merged the two provinces of Upper Canada and Lower Canada into the Province of Canada, with a single Parliament. The separate parliaments of Lower Canada and Upper Canada were abolished. The Union Act provided that the town of Hamilton would constitute one electoral district in the Legislative Assembly of the new Parliament, but gave the Governor General of the Province of Canada the power to draw the boundaries for the electoral district.

The first Governor General, Lord Sydenham, issued a proclamation shortly after the formation of the Province of Canada in early 1841, establishing the boundaries for the electoral district:

The Town of Hamilton shall be bounded and limited as follows:—commencing at the north-east corner of broken lot number thirteen, in the first concession of the Township of Barton, at the water's edge of Burlington Bay; thence along the shore of the said Bay, to the north-west corner of lot number sixteen; thence southerly along the allowance for road between lots numbers sixteen and seventeen, to the allowance for road in rear of the third concession; thence easterly along the said allowance, to the allowance for road between lots numbers thirteen and twelve; thence along the said allowance to Burlington Bay, to the place of beginning.

== Members of the Legislative Assembly ==
Hamilton was represented by one member in the Legislative Assembly. The following were the members for Hamilton.

Parliament	Years	Member	Party
1st Parliament; 1841–1844	1841–1844	Sir Allan MacNab	Unionist; Compact Tory

== Abolition ==
The district was abolished on July 1, 1867, when the British North America Act, 1867 came into force, creating Canada and splitting the Province of Canada into Quebec and Ontario. It was succeeded by electoral districts of the same name in the House of Commons of Canada and the Legislative Assembly of Ontario.
