= Joseph Woods (Province of Canada politician) =

Province of Canada politician

Member of the Legislative Assembly of the Province of Canada for Kent
- In office 1841–1844
- Monarch: Victoria
- Governor General: Lord Sydenham (1841)
- Preceded by: New position
- Succeeded by: Samuel Bealey Harrison

Member of the Legislative Assembly of the Province of Canada for Kent
- In office 1845–1847
- Preceded by: Samuel Bealey Harrison

Personal details
- Citizenship: British subject
- Party: Compact Tory

Joseph Woods was a politician in the Province of Canada, which had been formed by the merger of Upper Canada and Lower Canada in early 1841. Woods served two terms in the Legislative Assembly of the new province. He was elected in 1841 to the first Parliament of the Province of Canada, representing the riding of Kent in Canada West (now Ontario). He was defeated in the general election of 1844, but re-elected in a subsequent by-election in 1845 when the Kent seat became vacant.

Woods was a Compact Tory, a conservative who supported the Family Compact, the oligarchic group which had controlled the government of Upper Canada prior to the merger with Lower Canada. In the general election of 1841 for the first Parliament, he won the election for the Kent riding, defeating Reform candidate Samuel Bealey Harrison. The election was hotly contested, and the returning officer refused to make a return of the writ. Woods successfully petitioned the Legislative Assembly to be declared the winner of the election.

Following the election, there was a large public dinner held in his honour in the town of Chatham on July 16, 1841. Amongst those who attended were Harrison and Colonel Prince, who had been elected in the neighbouring riding of Essex. After the dinner, there were toasts to Queen Victoria and to the Governor General of the Province of Canada, and British patriotic songs were sung.

Analysing the overall election results, the Governor General, Lord Sydenham, stated that he believed that there were about six Compact Tories who would oppose his administration. Woods was likely amongst those six.

In the first session of the Parliament, Woods voted in support of the union, but also voted with the other Compact Tories in opposition to Sydenham's attempts to form a broad-based government across factional lines. In subsequent sessions, he voted consistently with the other Compact Tories, against proposals that tended to increase the authority of the Assembly over that of the Governor General.
