= Lincoln North (Province of Canada electoral district) =

Electoral district of the Parliament of the Province of Canada

Lincoln North Canada West
Province of Canada electoral district

Defunct pre-Confederation electoral district
- Legislature: Legislative Assembly of the Province of Canada
- District created: 1841
- District abolished: 1867
- First contested: 1841
- Last contested: 1863

Lincoln North was an electoral district of the Legislative Assembly of the Parliament of the Province of Canada, in Canada West (now Ontario). It was created in 1841, upon the establishment of the Province of Canada by the union of Upper Canada and Lower Canada. Lincoln North was represented by one member in the Legislative Assembly. It was abolished in 1867, upon the creation of Canada and the province of Ontario.

== Boundaries ==
Lincoln North electoral district was located in the Niagara peninsula (now in the Regional Municipality of Niagara). Major centres included the former capital of Upper Canada, Niagara (now Niagara-on-the-Lake), and the town of Ancaster.

The Union Act, 1840 had merged the two provinces of Upper Canada and Lower Canada into the Province of Canada, with a single Parliament. The separate parliaments of Lower Canada and Upper Canada were abolished. The Union Act provided that the pre-existing electoral boundaries of Upper Canada would continue to be used in the new Parliament, unless altered by the Union Act itself.

Lincoln County was one of the electoral districts which was altered by the Union Act. When originally created in 1792, Lincoln County had been composed of four ridings, each sending a member to the Upper Canada Legislative Assembly. The Union Act instead split Lincoln County into two different electoral districts, each containing two of the former ridings.

The Union Act defined Lincoln North as follows:

15. And be it enacted, That the County of Lincoln in the Province of Upper Canada shall be divided into Two Ridings, to be called respectively the North Riding and the South Riding; and that the North Riding shall be formed by uniting the First Riding and Second Riding of the said County, and the South Riding by uniting the Third Riding and Fourth Riding of the said County; and that the North and South Riding of the last-mentioned County shall each be represented by One Member in the Legislative Assembly of the Province of Canada.

The boundaries of the first and second ridings of Lincoln County had been set out in a proclamation of the first Lieutenant Governor of Upper Canada, John Graves Simcoe, in 1792:

That the fifteenth of the said counties be hereafter called by the name of the county of Lincoln; which county is to be divided into four ridings. The first riding is to be bounded on the west by the easternmost line of the county of York, on the south by the Grand river, to be called the Ouse, thence descending the said river until it meets an Indian road leading to the forks of the Chippawa creek, which creek is to be called the Welland, thence descending the said creek until it meets the continuation of the easternmost boundary of the late township No. 5, thence north along the said boundary until it intersects lake Ontario, thence along the south shore of lake Ontario until it meets the southeast boundary of the county of York. The second riding is to be bounded on the west by the easternmost line of the first riding, on the north by lake Ontario, on the east by the river Niagara, and on the south by the northern boundary of the late townships No. 2, No. 9, and No. 10.

The boundaries had been further defined by a statute of Upper Canada in 1798:

27. And be it further enacted by the authority aforesaid, That the townships of Clinton, Grimsby, Saltfleet, Barton, Ancaster, Glanford, Binbrook, Gainsborough and Caistor, do constitute and form the first Riding of the County of Lincoln.

28. And be it further enacted by the authority aforesaid, That the townships of Newark, Grantham and Louth, do constitute and form the second Riding of the County of Lincoln: Provided always, that the town and township of Newark, now generally called West Niagara, be henceforth declared and called the town and township of Niagara, respectively.

Those boundaries were used until Lincoln North was abolished on Confederation in 1867.

== Members of the Legislative Assembly ==
Lincoln North was represented by one member in the Legislative Assembly. The following were the members for Lincoln North.

Parliament	Years	Member	Party
1st Parliament; 1841–1844	1841–1844	William Hamilton Merritt	Unionist; moderate Reformer

== Abolition ==
The electoral district was abolished on July 1, 1867, when the British North America Act, 1867 came into force, creating Canada and splitting the Province of Canada into Quebec and Ontario.
