= Samuel Bealey Harrison =

Province of Canada politician

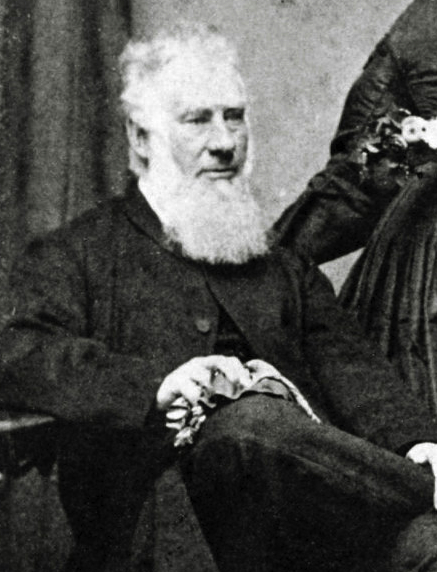
- Samuel Bealey Harrison

1st Joint Premier of the Province of Canada
- In office 1841–1842 Serving with William Henry Draper
- Monarch: Victoria
- Governors General: Lord Sydenham (1841); Sir Charles Bagot (1842–1843)
- Preceded by: none
- Succeeded by: William Henry Draper

Member of the Legislative Assembly of the Province of Canada for Kingston
- In office 1841–1844
- Preceded by: Anthony Manahan

Personal details
- Born: 4 March 1802 Manchester, England
- Died: 23 July 1867 (aged 65) Toronto, Ontario
- Party: Reformer
- Profession: farmer, lawyer, mill owner, politician, judge

Samuel Bealey Harrison (March 4, 1802 – July 23, 1867) was Joint Premier of the Province of Canada for Canada East from 1841 to 1842 with William Henry Draper PM for Canada West. Draper was a member of the Family Compact and Harrison was a moderate Reformer, the predecessor of the Liberal Party of Canada.

Born in Manchester England to John and Mary Harrison, Harrison was a lawyer, miller, politician, and judge. He was called to the bar in 1832 and entered practice in London. Because of ill health, he retired to Upper Canada near Oakville in 1837, intending to become a gentleman farmer. He also built a sawmill and gristmill on his property. In 1839, he was called to the bar in Upper Canada and was appointed a justice of the peace in the following year.

In 1841, Lord Sydenham appointed him provincial secretary for Canada West in the Executive Council of the Province of Canada. After two unsuccessful attempts to be elected to the Legislative Assembly of the Province of Canada (in Hamilton and then Kent), he was elected in a by-election in Kingston on July 1, 1841. He served as government leader with William Henry Draper. In 1842, he was appointed to the Board of Works which was responsible for the building and improvement of canals within the province. Harrison was responsible for drafting and introducing the Common Schools Bill and the District Councils Bill which established elected municipal government in Canada West. Harrison introduced amendments which watered down Robert Baldwin's resolutions calling for responsible government to make them acceptable to Sydenham. However, it was Harrison who recommended to Sydenham's successor, Sir Charles Bagot, that Baldwin and Louis-Hippolyte Lafontaine be invited to form the next government. Harrison served as provincial secretary in the new administration but resigned in 1843 to protest the movement of the capital from Kingston to Montreal. He was elected again to the assembly in Kent in 1844 but resigned in 1845 to accept an appointment as judge of the Surrogate Court for the Home District. He served in that position for 22 years, continuing in the court for York County after the district was abolished. He was named to the Board of Education for Canada West and also served in the Senate for the University of Toronto.

Harrison died in Toronto shortly after Confederation.
