= Benjamin-Henri Le Moine =

Benjamin-Henri Le Moine (August 15, 1811 – April 18, 1875) was a banker and political figure in Canada East. He represented Huntingdon in the Legislative Assembly of the Province of Canada from 1844 to 1848.

He was born in Quebec City, the son of Benjamin Le Moine and Julia Ann MacPherson, and apprenticed in business with C.A. Holt. Le Moine was a director of La Banque du Peuple, founded in 1835 by Jacob De Witt and Louis-Michel Viger, and served as president of the bank from 1870 until he retired in 1872. In 1836, he married his cousin, Sophia Eliza MacPherson. He did not run for re-election to the assembly in 1848. Le Moine died, probably in Montreal, at the age of 63.
