= Archibald Petrie =

Archibald Petrie (1790-1864) was a resident of Cumberland Township, Ontario who represented Russell County in the 2nd Parliament of the Province of Canada from 1844 to 1847.

He served as captain in the local militia during the Upper Canada Rebellion of 1837. He was a member of Cumberland Council from 1852 to 1864 and was reeve from 1852 to 1856.

Petrie Island, an island in the Ottawa River, was named after Petrie, although he was not the original owner.
