= Anthony Manahan =

Canadian politician

Anthony Manahan (c. 1794 – January 21, 1849) was a businessman and political figure in Upper Canada.

He was born in County Galway in Ireland around 1794 and went to Trinidad around 1808. In 1820, he moved to Kingston in Upper Canada and began business as a merchant. In 1824, he became manager of the iron works at Marmora which were then owned by Peter McGill; he returned to Kingston in 1831. He became a major in the Hastings militia in 1826 and was made a colonel in 1830. In 1829, he was appointed justice of the peace in the Midland District. In 1836, he was elected to the Legislative Assembly of Upper Canada.

During his time in office, Manahan promoted the development of a canal along the Trent River. He also brought forward allegations of discrimination of Irish Catholics in the province. Manahan was crown lands agent in the Midland and Prince Edward Districts from 1837 to 1844. He was elected to the 1st Parliament of the Province of Canada in 1841 but resigned to allow Samuel Bealey Harrison, appointed secretary for Canada West, to be elected to the assembly. Manahan was then appointed customs collector in Toronto. He resigned in 1843. An audit found that he had made unauthorized expenditures while in the post and he was forced to sell his property to cover these costs.

He died in Kingston in 1849.
