= Lawrence Lawrason =

Lawrence Lawrason (August 10, 1803 – August 14, 1882) was a businessman and political figure in Canada West.

He was born in Ancaster Township, Upper Canada in 1803. He found work as a clerk at the age of 14 with merchants James Hamilton and John Warren at Queenston and later at Sterling (now St. Thomas). In 1822, he purchased a farm in London Township with his brothers. He also opened a general store and distillery. In 1832, he moved to London and opened a general store and also sold dry goods wholesale, in partnership with George Jervis Goodhue. In 1835, he was named a justice of the peace. From 1842 to 1845 and 1847 to 1850, Lawrason was a member of the council for London District. He was elected to represent London in the Legislative Assembly of the Province of Canada in an 1844 by-election; he was reelected in the general election of the same year but then resigned to give William Henry Draper a seat in the assembly. He was named an officer to settle rebellion losses claims in the district in the same year. Lawrason served on the town council for London. He was also president of the London and Port Stanley Railway and a director of the Bank of Upper Canada. He served in the local militia, becoming lieutenant-colonel by 1856. After he retired in 1855, he loaned a large amount of money and guaranteed loans for his son-in-law, Lionel Augustus Clark Ridout. Following a downturn in the economy and the death of his son-in-law, Lawrason was forced to declare bankruptcy in 1864.

He died in London in 1882.
