= George Barker Hall =

George Barker Hall (1819 – February 1858) was a lawyer, judge and political figure in Canada West. He represented South Northumberland in the Legislative Assembly of the Province of Canada from 1844 to 1847 as a Conservative.

He was born in Brooklyn, New York, later settling in Peterborough, Upper Canada. Hall owned a flour mill in Peterborough. In 1847, he was named a judge for the Colborne District. Hall served briefly as an ensign in the local militia around the time of the Upper Canada Rebellion. He died suddenly at Beavermead, his residence near Peterborough, at the age of 39. John A. Macdonald was executor for Hall's estate.
