= George Duggan (politician) =

George Duggan (August 1812 – June 14, 1876) was a lawyer, judge and political figure in Canada West.

He was born in County Cork, Ireland in 1812 and moved to Upper Canada with his parents. He studied law at York (Toronto) and was called to the bar in 1837. In 1840, he formed a law firm with his brother John. He was a member of the Orange Order, becoming district master and, in 1849, junior deputy grand master for British North America. He served on the Toronto city council from 1838 to 1840 and from 1843 to 1850. In 1841, he was elected to the 1st Parliament of the Province of Canada in the 2nd riding of York; he was reelected in 1844. In 1868, he was named judge in the York County court.

He died in Toronto in 1876.
