= James Smith (Canada East politician) =

James Smith, QC (May 16, 1806 – November 29, 1868) was a lawyer, judge and political figure in Quebec. He represented Missisquoi in the Legislative Assembly of the Province of Canada from 1844 to 1847 as a Conservative.

He was born in Montreal, Lower Canada, the son of James Smith and Susanna McClement. Smith studied with John Doty in Trois-Rivières and completed his education in Scotland. On his return to Lower Canada in 1823, he studied law with Benjamin Beaubien and Samuel Gale; Smith was called to the Lower Canada bar in 1828 and set up practice in Montreal. He was named to a commission created by Governor Charles Bagot in 1841 to review the seigneurial system; the commission's report recommended that the system be abolished. Smith became a Queen's Counsel in 1844. Also in 1844, he was named to the Executive Council as attorney general for Lower Canada. In 1847, he was named a judge in the Court of Queen's Bench. He was named to the Superior Court for Montreal district in 1849. In 1854, he was appointed to the Seigneurial Court created to deal with the abolition of the seigneurial system. Smith retired in August 1868 and died several months later in Montreal at the age of 62.
