= Edward Ermatinger =

Canadian politician (1797–1876)

Edward Ermatinger (February 1797 – October 1876) was a Canadian fur trader, businessman and political figure.

== Biography ==
He was born on the isle of Elba in 1797, as his father, Lawrence Edward Ermatinger, was a commissary officer in the British Army. His grandfather was the Swiss-born merchant, Lawrence Ermatinger (1736-1789). His mother, of Italian origin, died when he was an infant.

He was educated in England and went to York Factory in 1818 with his brother Francis as a clerk for the Hudson's Bay Company. He served with the company until 1828 in what is now Manitoba and the Columbia district. He visited England in 1828 and then returned to Upper Canada the following year. He settled in St. Thomas, where he served as postmaster, reeve, owned a general store and was manager for the Bank of Upper Canada, then the Commercial Bank and finally the Bank of Montreal. He was elected to the Legislative Assembly of the Province of Canada for Middlesex in 1844 as a Conservative. He was editor and owner of the St. Thomas Standard. In 1851, he helped found the Bank of the County of Elgin. Ermatinger published The Hudson’s Bay territories; a series of letters on this important question in 1858 and an autobiography of Colonel Talbot in 1859. He was a member of the Church of England, a Freemason and a fervent anti-Catholic.

Ermatinger died at St. Thomas in 1876.

His uncle, Charles Oakes Ermatinger (1776-1833), was also a member of the Hudson's Bay Company. His son Charles Oaks served in the Legislative Assembly of Ontario.

== Bibliography ==
- Ermatinger, Edward. Life of Colonel Talbot, and the Talbot Settlement Its Rise and Progress, with Sketches of the Public Characters, and Career of Some of the Most Conspicuous Men in Upper Canada, Who Were Either Friends or Acquaintances of the Subjects of These Memoirs. St. Thomas, Ont.?: s.n, 1982. ISBN 0-665-34899-1
- Ermatinger, Edward. The Hudson's Bay Territories A Series of Letters on This Important Question. Toronto?: s.n.], 1858. ISBN 0-665-37011-3
- Ermatinger, Edward, C. O. Ermatinger, and James White. Edward Ermatinger's York Factory Express Journal, Being a Record of Journeys Made between Fort Vancouver and Hudson Bay in the Years 1827-1828. 1912.
