= William Henry Draper (judge) =

Co-premier of the Province of Canada

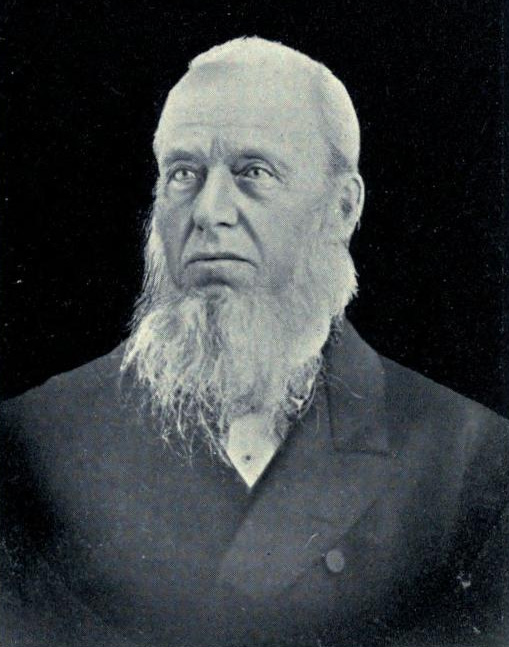

Joint Premier of the Province of Canada
- In office 12 December 1843 – 28 May 1847 Serving with Denis-Benjamin Viger (1843–1846); Denis-Benjamin Papineau (1846–1848)
- Preceded by: Dominick Daly (acting)
- Succeeded by: Henry Sherwood
- In office 5 February 1841 – 14 September 1842 Serving with Samuel Harrison (1841–1842); Charles Richard Ogden (1842)
- Preceded by: Office established
- Succeeded by: Robert Baldwin

Member of the Legislative Assembly of the Province of Canada
- In office 1841–1843
- Preceded by: Office established
- Succeeded by: Stewart Derbishire
- Constituency: Russell

Member of the Legislative Assembly of Upper Canada
- In office 1836–1840
- Preceded by: James Edward Small
- Succeeded by: Office abolished
- Constituency: Toronto

Personal details
- Born: March 11, 1801 London, England
- Died: November 3, 1877 (aged 76) Toronto, Ontario
- Party: Moderate Conservative
- Spouse: Mary White
- Children: William George Draper; Francis Collier Draper
- Profession: Lawyer

William Henry Draper (March 11, 1801 – November 3, 1877) was a lawyer, judge, and politician in Upper Canada, later Canada West.

== Personal life ==
He was born near London, England, in 1801, the son of Rev. Henry Draper and Mary Louisa. He joined the East India Company at age 15 and made at least two voyages to India.

In 1820, he settled in Port Hope, Upper Canada. Draper married Augusta "Mary" White in York, Upper Canada, in 1826 with whom he had several children, including William George Draper and Francis Collier Draper, both of whom were well-known lawyers; the latter also served as chief of police in Toronto.

He died in Yorkville (now part of Toronto) in 1877.

== Legal career ==
In 1822, he started to study law under Thomas Ward in Port Hope. He then moved to Cobourg and finished his articles in the office of George Strange Boulton. In 1828, Draper was called to the bar of the Law Society of Upper Canada. In 1829, he secured a position in the office of John Beverley Robinson and then partnered with Solicitor General Christopher Alexander Hagerman.

== Political career ==
He was elected to the 13th Parliament of Upper Canada and represented Toronto in 1836. Later that year, he was appointed to the Executive Council and the following year became solicitor general. Draper handled many of the prosecutions following the Upper Canada Rebellion of 1837.

By 1839, he had broken with his Family Compact friends and set his political goal: "To found a party on a larger basis than ever had been formed before." In 1840, he became attorney general for Upper Canada. Draper supported the union of Upper and Lower Canada on economic grounds and also believed that because the British government favoured the union, it would be better to participate in the process than to criticize it from the sidelines. He was elected to the 1st Parliament of the United Canadas as a moderate conservative and continued as attorney general for Canada West, a member of the Executive Council, and a co-leader of the government in the Assembly along with the moderate liberal Samuel Harrison. Although his first attempts to establish a conservative alliance with French Canadians failed, Draper played an important role in enabling Louis-Hippolyte Lafontaine to take office in 1842, even at the cost of resigning himself and of seeing Robert Baldwin succeed him as attorney general for Canada West.

Draper resumed leading the government 13 December 1843 jointly with Denis-Benjamin Viger. At the next election, in 1844, the supporters of Draper, Viger and Governor Charles Metcalfe, including the young John A. Macdonald, won a majority. He continued as government leader until 1847. During this period, legislation was passed dealing with schools in both Canada East and Canada West, but Draper's attempt to establish a University of Upper Canada failed. Draper helped Macdonald gain recognition by naming him to a cabinet post.

In 1847, with the arrival of Lord Elgin, Draper resigned from the position of attorney general and became a judge of the Court of Queen's Bench. In 1856, he became chief justice of the Court of Common Pleas of Upper Canada, and in 1869, he became chief justice of the Court of Error and Appeal in Ontario.

Professional and academic associations
Preceded by George William Allan	President of the Royal Canadian Institute	Succeeded by Sir Oliver Mowat

Political offices
Preceded by Samuel Harrison	Joint Premiers of the Province of Canada; 1841–1842	Succeeded by William Henry Draper as Joint Premiers of the Provinces of Canada
Preceded by Sir William Henry Draper as Prime Minister of the Provinces of Canada	Joint Premiers of the Province of Canada - Canada West; 1842	Succeeded by Robert Baldwin
Preceded by Robert Baldwin	Joint Premiers of the Province of Canada - Canada West; 1843–1847	Succeeded by Henry Sherwood
Legal offices
Preceded by Sir John Beverley Robinson, 1st Baronet; 1829–1862	Chief Justice of Canada West; 1862–1867	Succeeded by Chief Justice of Ontario
