= Upper Canada Tories =

Political group in Canada, dissolved 1867

Tories
- Leader: John A. Macdonald (last)
- Founded: Early 19th century
- Dissolved: 1867
- Merged into: Conservative Party of Ontario
- Headquarters: York, Upper Canada (until 1834); Toronto, Canada West (after 1834)
- Ideology: Conservatism; Toryism
- Political position: Centre-right

The Upper Canada Tories were formed from the elements of the Family Compact after the War of 1812. The movement was merely a group of like-minded conservative elite in the early days of Canada.

The Tories would later form an alliance with the Parti bleu in Lower Canada after the Union of 1841; they would finally merge as a single political party, the Conservative Party of Canada, after 1867.

== List of political figures with ties to the Tories ==
- Henry Sherwood - Mayor of Toronto, MLA in the Parliament of Upper Canada and later Premier of Canada West
- William Henry Draper - MLA in the Parliament of Upper Canada and later Premier of Canada West
- Henry John Boulton - Solicitor General and Attorney General of Upper Canada
- Archibald Macdonald - MLA
- Archibald McLean - MLA, Speaker and jurist
- Sir John Robinson, 1st Baronet, of Toronto
- Levius Peters Sherwood
- George Strange Boulton
- William Allan
- Augustus Warren Baldwin
- George Monro
- John Alexander Macdonald
