= Parliament of the Province of Canada =

Legislature for the Province of Canada (1841–1867)

Parliament of the Province of Canada Parlement de la Province du Canada

Type
- Type: Bicameral
- Houses: Legislative Council; Legislative Assembly
- Term limits: Four years from election, unless sooner dissolved

History
- Founded: February 10, 1841
- Disbanded: July 1, 1867
- Preceded by: Special Council of Lower Canada; Parliament of Upper Canada
- Succeeded by: Parliament of Canada; Parliament of Ontario; Legislature of Quebec

Leadership
- Head of state: British Monarch
- Monarch's Representative: Governor General of the Province of Canada
- Heads of government: Joint Premiers of the Province of Canada
- Legislative leaders: Speaker of the Legislative Council; Speaker of the Legislative Assembly
- Seats: Legislative Council: 24; Legislative Assembly: 84

Elections
- Legislative Council voting system: Life appointments
- Legislative Assembly voting system: Single-member districts First-past-the-post voting Open ballot system Adult male franchise with property qualification

Constitution
- Act of Union 1840

The Parliament of the Province of Canada was the legislature for the Province of Canada, made up of the two regions of Canada West (formerly Upper Canada, later Ontario) and Canada East (formerly Lower Canada, later Quebec).

== Creation of the Parliament ==
The Province of Canada was created by an Act of the British Parliament, the Act of Union 1840, which was proclaimed in force by the Governor General of the Canadas, Lord Sydenham, effective February 10, 1841. The Act united the two provinces of Lower Canada and Upper Canada into a single province, with a single parliament. The parliaments of Lower Canada and Upper Canada were abolished. Lower Canada was renamed Canada East, and Upper Canada was renamed Canada West, but the two regions were administrative divisions only. They did not have separate governments. The Union had been recommended by Lord Durham in his Report on the Affairs of British North America, in response to the Rebellions of 1837–1838 in both Lower Canada and Upper Canada.

== Structure of the Parliament ==
The new Parliament consisted of the British monarch, represented by the Governor General; the elected lower house, the Legislative Assembly, and the appointed upper house, the Legislative Council. The new parliament had the general power to legislate for the "Peace, Welfare, and good Government of the Province of Canada", provided Canadian laws did not conflict with British statutes which applied to the Province.

The Legislative Assembly was required to have equal representation from Canada East and Canada West, even though the population of Canada East was considerably larger. In 1840, the population of Canada East was estimated at 670,000, while the population of Canada West was estimated to be 480,000. Lord Durham had not recommended this approach, and had instead proposed that the representation should be based on the respective populations of the two regions. The British government rejected that recommendation and instead implemented equal representation, apparently to give the English-speaking population of the new province a dominant voice in the provincial government, furthering the goal of assimilating the French-speaking population.

The Act did not determine the size of the Legislative Council, simply providing that it had to consist of at least twenty members, who were appointed for life. In his initial appointments, Lord Sydenham appointed twenty-four members.

== Elections and Qualifications ==
The first election was governed by the election laws in force in Upper Canada and in Lower Canada prior to the union.

=== Right to vote ===
The right to vote in elections to the Legislative Assembly was restricted to male British subjects (by birth, naturalisation or by conquest and cession), aged 21 and older. They were also required to meet a property qualification. In rural areas, only the owners of land of a net yearly value of forty shillings or higher were entitled to vote. In towns and townships, the right to vote was restricted to those who owned a dwelling house and land of a yearly value of at least five pounds sterling, or to those who rented their dwelling house at an annual rate of ten pounds sterling and had lived in the town or township for at least one year before the election. Individuals who had been convicted of treason or a felony were excluded from voting.

=== Qualification for the Legislative Assembly ===
Only male British subjects (by birth, naturalisation or by conquest and cession), aged 21 and older, were eligible for election to the Legislative Assembly. Members of the clergy, whether Protestant or Roman Catholic, were barred from election to the Legislative Assembly, as were individuals who had been convicted of treason or a felony. Members of the Legislative Council could not be members of the Legislative Assembly.

Members of the Legislative Assembly had to meet a property qualification, which was considerably higher than the property qualification for voting. They were required to own real estate of a net value of five hundred pounds sterling, over and above all rents, charges, mortgages and encumbrances.

Before taking their seats, members of the Legislative Assembly had to swear an oath of allegiance to the British monarch.

=== Qualification for the Legislative Council ===
Members of the Legislative Council were required to be 21 years old or over, and a British subject, by birth or naturalisation. The Governor General appointed the members of the Legislative Council, who held office for life, unless a member resigned or the seat was declared vacant by reason of absence or adherence to any foreign power.

Before taking their seats, members of the Legislative Council had to swear an oath of allegiance to the British monarch.

=== Conduct of elections ===
Elections for the Legislative Assembly were initiated by issuance of writs for election, one to each electoral district. The elections were conducted in each electoral district by a local returning officer. If more than one candidate was nominated, the returning officer would conduct a poll at a central location in the electoral district. Voters would come to the polling location, and would publicly vote for the candidate of their choice, which would be recorded by the poll clerk in a poll book against the voters' names. The returning officer would declare the candidate with the most votes to be elected. The returning officer for each electoral district would send a return of the writ to the Clerk of the Crown in Chancery.

== Parliamentary government ==
=== Sittings and duration ===
The Parliament was to be summoned by the Governor General at least once per year. Elections of the Legislative Assembly were to occur every four years, subject to earlier dissolution by the Governor General. The Governor General also retained the power to prorogue the Parliament.

=== Executive government ===
Although Lord Durham had recommended that the British government institute responsible government, with the members of the Executive Council responsible to the Parliament, the British government rejected this proposal. Control of the executive initially remained with the Governor General. There was an Executive Council, appointed by the Governor General, but the Governor General was not required to act on their advice. He retained the ability to exercise executive powers on his own initiative alone.

=== Reservation and disallowance of bills ===
The Governor General had the power to grant assent to bills passed by the Legislative Assembly and Legislative Council, to refuse assent, or to reserve a bill for consideration by the monarch. If a bill was reserved, it was forwarded to London, where the government would decide if the bill should be allowed to come into force. The British Cabinet would advise the monarch whether to grant or withhold royal assent. If the monarch granted assent, the bill came into force. If royal assent was denied, the bill never became law.

Even if the Governor General granted assent, the British government retained the power to disallow a law. All acts had to be sent to the Colonial Office after the Governor General granted assent. The British government could advise the monarch to disallow an Act, at any time up to two years after receipt of the Act. If an Act was disallowed, it ceased to have effect from the date the Governor General advised the Legislative Assembly and the Legislative Council of the disallowance.

=== Political parties ===
Candidates at this time would be loosely affiliated in early political parties, but party structure was not strong, and there were different party groups in Canada East and Canada West. In the early years of the new Province, the major political debate was over local control of the government. Groups such as the Chateau Clique in Canada East and the Family Compact in Canada West favoured the power of the Governor General, appointed by the British government and taking instructions from Britain. Their opponents, known by various names such as Reformers, Parti patriote, and Groupe canadien-français, argued for local control of the government, under the system of responsible government used in Britain itself.

== Legislative Sessions ==
The Parliament was convened eight times in its history:

- 1st Parliament of the Province of Canada 1841–1843
- 2nd Parliament of the Province of Canada 1844–1847
- 3rd Parliament of the Province of Canada 1848–1851
- 4th Parliament of the Province of Canada 1852–1854
- 5th Parliament of the Province of Canada 1854–1857
- 6th Parliament of the Province of Canada 1858–1861
- 7th Parliament of the Province of Canada 1861–1863
- 8th Parliament of the Province of Canada 1863–1867

Following the Province of Canada's entry into Canadian Confederation on 1 July 1867, the Parliament of the Province of Canada ceased to exist. Because the new country of Canada was a federation, the Parliament's powers were divided between levels of government. Its section 91 powers were assigned to the current Parliament of Canada, while its section 92 powers were assigned to the current Parliament of Ontario (for Canada West) and the Legislature of Quebec (for Canada East).

== Legacy ==
The Parliament is noteworthy for its efforts in codifying the law, generally with respect to the statute law in 1859, with the enactment of the Consolidated Statutes of Canada, the Consolidated Statutes for Lower Canada, and the Consolidated Statutes for Upper Canada; and especially for the passage of the Civil Code of Lower Canada in 1866.

Several effects of actions taken by the Parliament can still be felt to the present day. Under s. 129 of the Constitution Act, 1867, limits have been placed on the ability of the legislatures of Ontario and Quebec to amend or repeal Acts of the former Province of Canada. Where such an Act created a body corporate operating in the former Province, the Judicial Committee of the Privy Council held that such bodies cannot have "provincial objects" and only the Parliament of Canada had power to deal with such acts. It has been held that this restriction exists for any Act applying equally to Upper and Lower Canada, (Note: Ex parte O'Neill, RJQ 24 SC 304, where it was held that the Legislative Assembly of Quebec was unable to repeal the Temperance Act, 1864, but it could pass a concurrent statute for regulating liquor traffic within the Province. However, it has also been held that the Parliament of Canada could not repeal that Act with respect only to Ontario.) which became problematic when the Civil Code of Lower Canada was replaced by the Civil Code of Quebec.
