= Canada East =

Subdivision of the Province of Canada (1841–67)

Canada East Canada-Est (French)
- 1841–1867
- Flag
- Anthem: God Save the Queen
- Status: Subdivision of the Province of Canada
- Common languages: French, English
- Government: Constitutional monarchy
- Sovereign
  - 1841–1867: Victoria
- Historical era: Pre-Confederation Era
  - Act of Union 1840: 10 February 1841
  - British North America Act, 1867: 1 July 1867

Population
  - 1851: 890,000
- ISO 3166 code: CA
Preceded by	Succeeded by
Lower Canada	Quebec
- Today part of: Canada

Canada East (French: Canada-Est) was the northeastern portion of the Province of Canada. Lord Durham's Report investigating the causes of the Upper and Lower Canada Rebellions recommended merging those two colonies. The new colony, known as the Province of Canada, was created by the Act of Union 1840 passed by the Parliament of the United Kingdom, having effect in 1841. For administrative purposes, the new Province was subdivided into Canada West and Canada East. The former name of "Lower Canada" came back into official use in 1849, and as of Canadian Confederation of 1867 it formed the newly created province of Quebec.

An estimated 890,000 people lived in Canada East in 1851.

== Geography ==
It consisted of the southern portion of the modern-day Canadian province of Quebec. It was a former British colony called the Province of Lower Canada. Based on Lord Durham's report it was merged with the Province of Upper Canada (present-day southern portion of the Province of Ontario) to create the Province of Canada.

== Language ==
Canada East was primarily a French-speaking region.

Due to heavy immigration following the American Revolutionary War, the population of English-speaking residents of Canada West soon outstripped Canada East. Under the Act of Union 1840 the seats in the lower legislature were evenly divided between East and West. There was no provision under the Act for representation by population.

== Politics ==
The Province of Canada, formed in 1840, was governed by the Parliament of the Province of Canada, elected in a mixture of multi-member districts and single-member districts, using block voting and first past the post respectively.

== Name ==
From 1841 to 1843, the terms Canada East and Canada West were used. The former names of the two colonies, Lower Canada and Upper Canada, had no constitutional status.

From April 25, 1849, the Canadian Parliament enacted an interpretation act, which once again gave legal meaning to the terms Lower Canada and Upper Canada:

The words "Lower Canada," shall mean all that part of this Province which formerly constituted the Province of Lower Canada. The words "Upper Canada," shall mean all that part of this Province which formerly constituted the Province of Upper Canada.

== 1866 Fenian raids ==
Fenian raids along the Canada–United States border south and east of Montreal were successfully repulsed, by both local militia and British regulars. The Fenians hoped to stir up a rebellion, and the British government did not want a repeat of the Rebellions of 1837–1838, for fear of losing more colonies to the United States and the material damage and loss of life such would entail.

== Economy ==
The most important farm products were potatoes, rye, buckwheat, maple sugar and livestock. When it came time to confederate, the Francophones were nervous because they did not want to lose their French heritage. They were afraid that it would be overwhelmed by the English.

At the time of Confederation (1867), Montreal was the largest city of the British North American colonies, with a population of 107,225. Some of the richest people in Canada lived in Montreal.

By the late 1850s all the land of Canada West had been bought. The next frontier was west of Lake Superior. However, this land was owned by the Hudson's Bay Company. Most in Canada East resisted the takeover of this land, as it would have changed the balance of the seats in the legislature.

The St. Lawrence River was full of ice for half the year. For that half of the year, goods had to be transported on American railways. People supported construction of a railway through Canada East to Halifax to provide an all-British route for trade and defence.

By the 1860s, the Grand Trunk Railway was about $72 million in debt. Its annual income was about $200. Partly because of this, the Province of Canada pulled out of the negotiations for the Intercolonial Railway.

Only 15% of Canada East's residents lived in cities in 1851. The rest were farmers, habitants as they called themselves. They built their own stone houses and wooden furniture. Their clothes were homemade and their food was grown on the farms.

Lumber was the most important natural resource of Canada East. In the woods, hundreds of workers cut down trees, then floated the logs down the St. Lawrence River during the spring floods. Sawmills turned the logs into planks and boards to sell to markets in the United States. Factories in the District of Canada East made windows, shingles, washboards, and door frames.

== See also ==
- Canada West
- Act of Union 1840
- History of Canada
