= Act of Union 1840 =

British statute establishing the Province of Canada

British North America Act 1840 (Note: The citation of this act by this short title was authorised by section 1 of, and the first schedule to, the Short Titles Act 1896. Due to the repeal of those provisions it is now authorised by section 19(2) of the Interpretation Act 1978.)
- Act of Parliament
- Parliament of the United Kingdom
- Long title: An Act to reunite the Provinces of Upper and Lower Canada, and for the Government of Canada.
- Citation: 3 & 4 Vict., c. 35
- Territorial extent: United Kingdom; Province of Canada

Dates
- Royal assent: 23 July 1840
- Commencement: 10 February 1841 (Note: Section 1.)
- Repealed: Canada: 17 April 1982
Other legislation
Amended by	Statute Law Revision Act 1874 (No. 2); British North America Act 1867
Repealed by	Canada: Constitution Act, 1982

Status: Partially repealed

Text of statute as originally enacted

The British North America Act, 1840 (3 & 4 Vict. c. 35), also known as the Act of Union 1840, (French: Acte d’Union) is an act of the Parliament of the United Kingdom passed in July 1840 and proclaimed February 10, 1841, in Montreal. It abolished the legislatures of Lower Canada and Upper Canada and established a new political entity, the Province of Canada to replace them.

== Background ==
=== Rebellion of Lower Canada ===
After the War of 1812, the elected assembly of Lower Canada was dominated by French Canadians. A strong sense of nationalism sprang up among the francophones living in Lower Canada. The nationalists were led by Louis-Joseph Papineau, who was a part of what would later be known as the Patriot Party. One of its biggest demands was to determine how the colony's revenue would be spent. It challenged the authority of the upper house of the legislature. As well, the party sought to take control of civil services such as the executive council, which advised the sitting governor-general.

All the demands were rejected by the Governor General, the Earl of Dalhousie, who was the governor general of British North America from 1820 to 1828. However, in 1828, he was replaced because of a negative report given by members of parliament comprising British reformers who sought to make peace with the Lower Canadian Assembly. The next governor general was Sir James Kempt, who lasted from 1828 to 1830. Kempt's time in office briefly eased tensions between the Patriot Party and the existing government. The next two governors general, Lord Aylmer (1830–1835) and Lord Gosford (1835–1838), also sought to reconcile the government with the ever-growing demands of the people. The situation in Lower Canada continued to worsen, nevertheless.

The French and the English living in Lower Canada became increasingly polarized from one another, as tensions continue to grow. The Patriot Party tried to reason with British rule, including by sending the Ninety-Two Resolutions. The British Parliament ignored the resolutions for about three years and then all but dismissed them.

Eventually, the Patriot Party organized and executed two rebellions, the first in November 1837 and the second in November 1838. French and English Patriots battled with British soldiers, French Canadian officers and English Montrealers. Both times, a lack of organization and numbers made the Patriots fall within a week of the rebellions' start.

=== Rebellion in Upper Canada ===
The rebellion in Upper Canada in 1837 was less violent than its counterpart in Lower Canada had been. However, Upper Canadian rebels were equally serious in their demands. The main leader of the rebellion was William Lyon Mackenzie. Its demands included democratic reform and the end of the rule of privileged oligarchy.

The rebellion in Upper Canada ran from December 5 to 8. The transfer of some of Britain's militia force to Lower Canada inspired rebels to try to seize the government and institute the constitution they had drafted, similar to that of the US Constitution. The rebels were dispersed by British arms and a group of government volunteers.

=== Effects of the rebellions ===
Because of the rebellions, the Crown and the British Parliament sent John George Lambton, Earl of Durham, back to Canada to report on what had caused the rebellions and outline suggestions on how to best fix the situation.

The investigation is now commonly known as the Durham Report. Because of suggestions by Lord Durham in his report, the British Parliament united Upper and Lower Canada as the Province of Canada.

== History ==
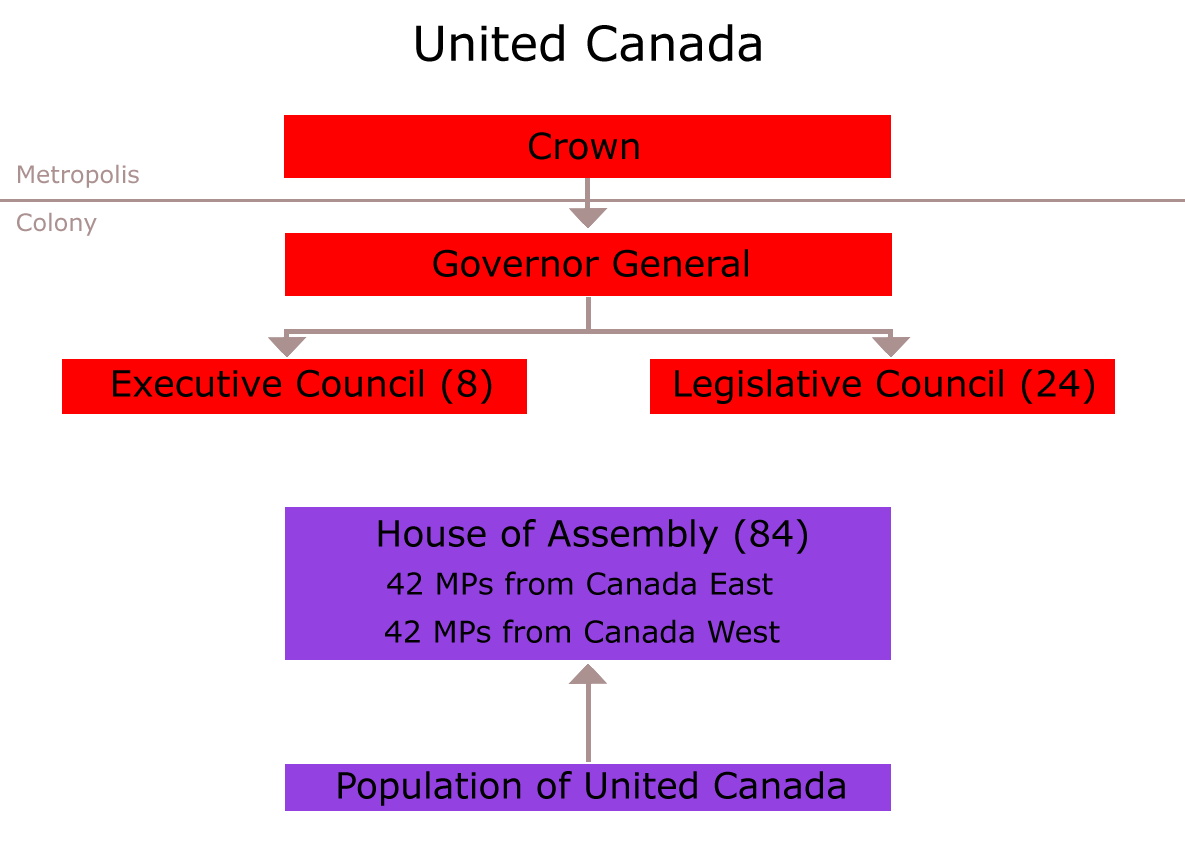
Political organization under the Union Act (1840)

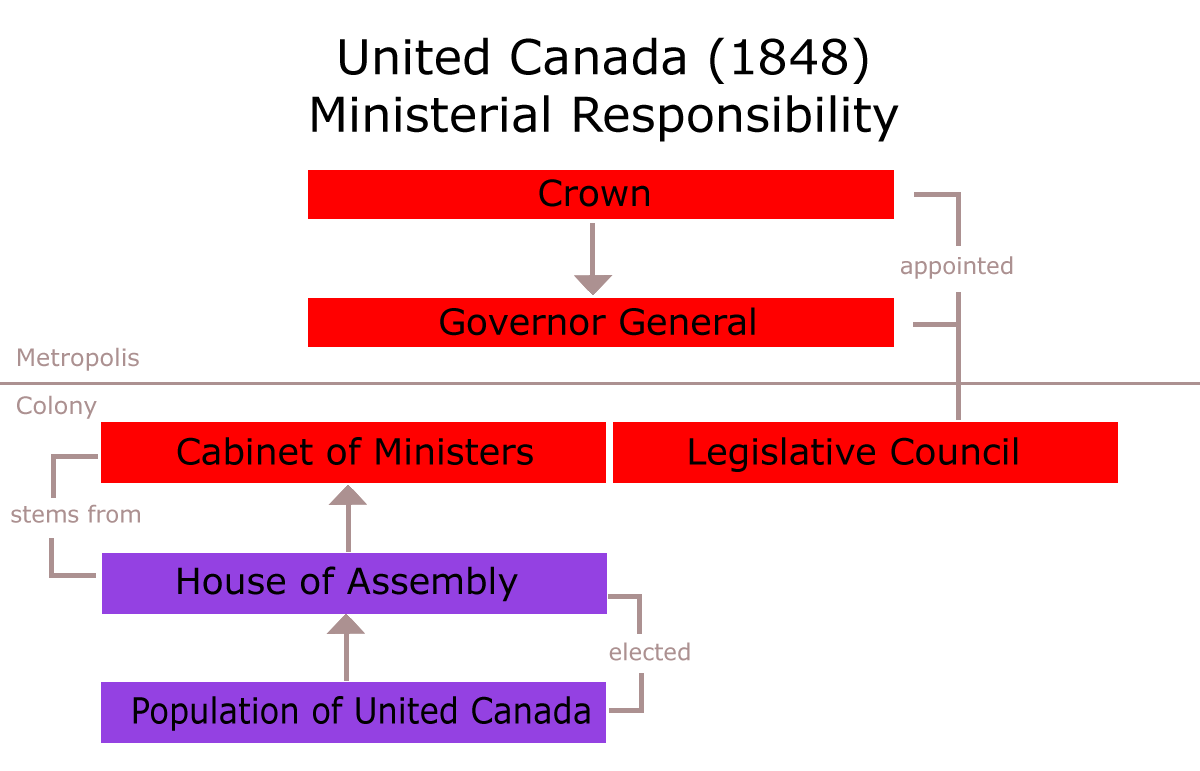
Political organization under the Union Act (1848)

Lord Durham wanted to re-instate peace throughout the colonies and recommended a political union. It was under his belief that peace could best be achieved by ensuring a loyal English majority in British North America, as well as by assimilating French Canadians, as he deemed them inferior to the English race, and by granting responsible government. The union was also proposed to solve pressing financial issues in Upper Canada, which had become increasingly indebted under the previous regime dominated by the Family Compact. These debts stemmed mostly from poor investments in canals connecting Upper Canada to the Port of Montreal in Lower Canada via the Great Lakes and St. Lawrence River. Due to Upper Canada's considerable debt and chronic budget shortfalls, it was hoped that its finances could be salvaged by merging it with the then-solvent Lower Canada.

Upper Canada, with its British and Protestant majority, was growing more rapidly than Lower Canada, with the French-Canadian and Catholic majority. It was hoped that by merging the two colonies, the French-Canadian cultural presence in North America would gradually disappear through assimilation. As such, the act also contained measures banning the French language from official use in the Canadian parliament. However, despite the amalgamation, the distinct legal systems of the two colonies were retained with Upper Canada becoming referred to as Canada West (with English common law) and Lower Canada as Canada East (with French civil law). In Upper Canada, there was opposition to unionization from the Family Compact, while in Lower Canada political and religious leaders reacted against Upper Canada's anti-French measures.

== Main provisions ==
The act established a single parliament with an equal number of seats for each region, now called Canada East and Canada West. Both regions’ debts were consolidated. A permanent Civil List was created. The French language was banished from official government use.

The legislation to fuse the two separate colonies into one functioning unit that would operate under one government instead of two separate legislatures was brought before the British House of Commons in May 1839. Later the legislation was sent for approval by both Upper and Lower Canada by way of Charles Poulett Thomson. He received acceptance of the legislation by both colonies in November and December of the same year. The legislation then became an act in July 1840 when passed by the British Parliament. On 10 February 1841, it was declared in Montreal, officially marking the beginning of the Province of Canada. The capital was moved to Kingston.

One of the main provisions of the act was establishing a single parliament with an equal number of seats per region. Canada West, with its 450,000 inhabitants, was represented by 42 seats in the Legislative Assembly, the same number as the more populated Canada East, with 650,000 inhabitants. The French-Canadian majority, as well as numerous anglophones, considered this an injustice. In Lower Canada, Louis-Joseph Papineau demanded representation by population and the recall of the union the minute he entered the new parliament of the united Canadas. Debts from Upper and Lower Canada were also combined and transferred to the Province of Canada.

The granting of responsible government to the colony is typically attributed to reforms in 1848 (principally the effective transfer of control over patronage from the governor to the elected ministry). The reforms resulted in the appointment of the second Baldwin-Lafontaine government that quickly removed many of the disabilities on French-Canadian political participation in the colony.

== Effects ==
By the late 1850s, massive immigration from the British Isles to Canada West changed the previous demographic imbalance between the English and French sections of the colony. Many politicians in Canada West began to lobby for representation by population, as they no longer considered the equal representation mandated by the Act of Union to be just.

In the end, the Act of Union failed at shutting down French Canadian political influence, especially after responsible government was granted to the colony. By voting en bloc the francophones of Canada East guaranteed a strong, unified presence in the Legislative Assembly since the anglophones of Canada West were highly factionalized. As a result, bills proposed by one of the anglophone Canada West factions required the support of the francophone Canada East votes to be passed. That was known as the double majority principle and reflected the duality of the two administrations. The principle was never officially recognized and became obviously impracticable.

However, the francophone presence remained inferior to their demographic weight in the executive and legislative councils. The government of Lafontaine-Baldwin succeeded in repealing the measure against the French language in the assembly, the courts, and the civil administration. With the double majority principle, both Canadas were "reseparated," and for a short while, both sides were managed independently. Joint premierships shared by an anglophone from Canada West and a francophone from Canada East became the convention, but continual legislative deadlock resulting from the conflicting aspirations of the two Canadas remained. Dissatisfaction resulting from the deadlock was one of the main factors for Canadian Confederation in 1867.

== See also ==
- Constitutional history of Canada
- History of Quebec
- Lower Canada Rebellion
- Quebec nationalism
- History of Canada
- Unionville, Ontario – named after Union Mills which was named by Ira White after the act
