= Grey Nuns (disambiguation) =

The Grey Nuns of Montreal is a Canadian religious institute of Roman Catholic religious sisters.

Grey Nuns may also refer to:

- Grey Nuns Community Hospital, an acute care hospital in Edmonton, Alberta, Canada
- Grey Nuns Hospital (now Pasqua Hospital), a hospital in Regina, Saskatchewan, Canada
- Grey Nuns' Hospital, a hospital that operated from 1695 to 1880 in Montreal, Quebec, Canada
- Grey Nuns Motherhouse, a Concordia University residence in Montreal
- Sisters of Charity of the Blessed Virgin Mary, a national institute founded in the United States by Mother Mary Frances Clarke
