= Marguerite Beaubien =

Canadian Roman Catholic nun (1797–1848)

Marguerite Beaubien (29 January 1797 – 11 August 1848) was born in Nicolet, Lower Canada the daughter of a farm family in the Trois-Rivières region. They were successful enough that Marguerite was well educated and she joined the Sisters of Charity of the Hôpital Général of Montreal in 1816. She took her vows in 1818 and worked with orphan girls. By 1833 she replaced the previous Mother Superior, Marie-Marguerite Lemaire, for a five-year term and was re-elected for a second term.

Under her superiorship, Mother Beaubien focused on the poor. She made many improvements to the community's facilities. She also approved a Sisters of Charity chapter at Saint-Hyacinthe. In 1843, the Sisters adopted new rules which had been drafted with the active participation of Bishop Ignace Bourget. In 1844 she became superior of the new community of the Sisters of Charity at Bytown (Ottawa). Illness followed shortly after this appointment and she was unable to continue active duties.

Marguerite Beaubien was an important figure in the Sisters of Charity during her lifetime. As superior, she oversaw growth within the community that strengthened it and widened its influence.
