= Coutlée =

Coutlée is a surname. Notable people with the surname include:

- Dominique-Amable Coutlée (1822–1882), Canadian merchant, farmer and politician from Quebec
- Thérèse-Geneviève Coutlée (1742–1821), Canadian nun
