= Assiniboia Residential School =

Assiniboia Residential School was a Canadian Indian residential school that was located in Winnipeg, Manitoba. It was active from 1958 to 1973, housing Indigenous children from all over Canada, including Manitoba, Saskatchewan, and Northwestern Ontario. The school was run and managed by the Oblates Father of Mary Immaculate and the Grey Nuns.

Now, the Assiniboia Residential School site is a memorial facility and a gathering place.

== History ==
=== Building ===
Prior to being a residential school, the building was first built in 1915 and used as a children's home. After the children's home moved to another place, the building became a veterans' hospital and later a residential school.

Assiniboia Residential School first opened in 1958, making it one of the 15 residential schools in Manitoba. It was the second residential school in the province, the first being in Lebret. The Assiniboia Residential School was high school-level and housed Indigenous students until 1967, when it became a hostel which housed students from faraway homes attending local public and Catholic high schools.

There were no structural changes until 1965, when the Taubensee Construction Company created a gymnasium on the south side of the school. In the 1980s the building was demolished to build a new RCMP forensic science laboratory.

==== Name ====
When it was founded until 1967 the school was called the Assiniboia Residential School. In 1966 it was also called the Assiniboia Indian Residential High School. When the building become a hostel in 1967, its name changed to Assiniboia Hostel until 1968. Assiniboia Student Residence was the final name of the establishment from 1968 until it shut down completely in 1973.

=== Land ===
The Assiniboia Residential School was located on "Treaty No. 1 territory, the traditional lands of the Anishinaabeg, Cree, Anisininewuk, Dene, and Dakota, and the homeland of the Red River Métis."

The address of Assiniboia Residential School was 621 Academy Road, Winnipeg, Manitoba. This was close to downtown, and the Assiniboine River. It was located in the prosperous neighbourhood of River Heights.

Interactive map of Assiniboia Residential School

=== Managed and funded ===
The school was managed by the Oblate Fathers of Mary Immaculate and the Grey Nuns. The Oblate Fathers of Mary Immaculate ran the school from 1958 to 1969, and the Grey Nuns helped run the school between 1961 and 1967.

Like most residential schools in Canada, Assiniboia Residential School was funded by the government. The Grey Nuns were in charge of grocery shopping for both the students and staff with a generous budget for the low number of students enrolled. Many of the recipients mention how the food was better than most residential schools, and this was because of the Grey Nuns, who prioritized nutrition for the students.

==== Principal ====
Father Omer Robidoux was the school's only principal. Working alongside him were the "Manitoba's Grey Nuns, who were tasked with supervising the girls, running the infirmary and taking care of the school and its students" until 1970.

=== Students and enrollment ===
The Assiniboia Residential School had over 1000 students who attended through the years 1958 to 1973. These students were between the ages of 15 and 20. The population of the school varied per year, but its final year 1972-1973 had the lowest enrollment of 25. Previous years had enrollment averages of about 100 students.

Many students who attended Assiniboia Residential School came from faraway, some from more than 800 km distance. Students attended from many provinces in Canada, including Manitoba, Saskatchewan, and Northwestern Ontario. "Roughly 85 First Nations [pupils] were forced to attend and live at this federal institution," according to Parks Canada.

Several students transferred to this school because their prior residential school, such as Fort Alexander, Sandy Bay, and Norway House, did not include secondary education.

== Life at Assiniboia ==
=== Activities ===
Assiniboia Residential School had no extracurricular activities during its first year. However, the following year of 1959 the school created and registered hockey teams that were composed of young men in the Greater Winnipeg Minor Hockey Association leagues. As the surrounding area of the school consisted of reservations, the hockey team consisted of Ojibway, Oji-Cree, Sioux First Nations, and Cree people.

The school enrolled the hockey team into the MAHA playdowns, after a year of being in the league. The Assiniboia hockey team went on to be the Manitoba Junior B Champions in 1960, 1961, 1962 and 1964. In 1963 the hockey team was still competing in the MAHA playdowns but in the Junior C division, and they won and became champions of that division.

At the beginning when the school was opened, students were experiencing separation and loneliness. As time went on and years passed, this started to change. Students were getting the chance to participate in different activities, such as sports teams, shopping downtown and work programs.

=== Grades ===
The Assiniboia Residential School originally consisted of four classrooms for grades 8 to 10. This changed in 1959 and 1960 as they expanded their school and added in Grade 11 and Grade 12. Eventually the school began to shut down starting with Grades 8 in 1962 and then 9 in 1965. This was the slow closure of the school that later happened in 1973.

== Closure ==
Assiniboia Residential School officially closed on July 25, 1973. There were a few different reasons behind this decision, the main one being new policies on residential schools in which the Canadian government shifted towards ending isolation of Indigenous children from their families.

Another factor was the decline of enrollment, with only 25 student enrolled in the final school year (1972-1973), a significant decline from the residential school's average annual number of 105 students.

== Legacy and reconciliation ==
=== Former Students ===
Many former students have made comments on the Assiniboia Residential School about how "different" it was compared to most residential schools. Some students reported that life at Assiniboia was a breath of fresh air, "where students began to peak out of a dark place", and recognize that life among non-Indigenous peoples was possible. These students said Assiniboia Residential School had a "more supportive environment", where they were offered higher quality food, opportunities to participate in high-level extracurricular activities, like the hockey team, and better health opportunities. Others were "damaged by their early childhood incarceration that their lives were lost in early adulthood."

Mabel Horton (née Hart), a former student of Assiniboia Residential School, is now a co-president of the Assiniboia Residential School Legacy Group. Mabel attended the school for a total of 5 years, starting in Grade 8 until Grade 12 when she graduated. She explains how her experience was "OK", considering she "wasn't physically abused, sexually abused, or otherwise." Although Mabel had a "good" experience, many students at other residential schools did not have the same experience.

=== The Assiniboia Residential School Legacy Group ===
The Assiniboia Residential School Legacy Group is "a non-profit organization that honors the legacy of the Assiniboia Residential School through commemorative and educational activities." It was formed by a group of former students who had met at a reunion in 2017, plus some local settlers.

The Assiniboia Residential School Legacy Group, along side with the government, and a few local architects, came together to create a meaningful memorial and commemorative monument site.

=== Reconciliation ===
The Manitoba government partnered with the Assiniboia Residential School Legacy Group to fund and build a memorial and commemorative monument site located on the site of the Assiniboia Residential School to honor the students who attended.

Within this memorial and commemorative monument site is the name of every child who attended the Assiniboia Residential School inscribed on a brick placed in a circle, with their communities' names inscribed on pillars that surround the circle. The pillars are in the colours of the four directions, and there is a fire in the center of the circle for gatherings and opportunities for offerings.
