= Marie-Marguerite Lemaire =

Marie-Marguerite Lemaire (May 14, 1769 – April 12, 1838) was a mother superior of the Sisters of Charity of the Hôpital Général of Montreal.

In 1821, Marie-Marguerite Lemaire became the superior after the death of Thérèse-Geneviève Coutlée.

Marie-Marguerite Lemaire resigned as superior because of ill health in 1833 and Marguerite Beaubien was her able replacement. She had been an important leader in that she improved the hospital, made the seigneury of Châteauguay more viable and was attentive to the needs of the community she served; especially the poor. She had contributed greatly to improving the material circumstances of the Sisters of Charity community.
