= Élodie Mailloux =

Pioneering organizer of nursing schools in Quebec, Canada

- Born: February 9, 1865; Saint-Jean-sur-Richelieu, Canada East
- Died: December 27, 1937; Montreal, Quebec, Canada
- Other names: Marie-Mélodie Mailloux
- Occupations: Sister of Charity, administrator, nurse, and educator
- Known for: Founding director of the École des Hospitalières et Gardes-Malades de l'Hôpital Notre-Dame

Élodie Mailloux (9 February 1865 – 27 December 1937) was the founding director of the first nursing school in Canada to offer instruction to lay people in the French language. The École des Hospitalières et Gardes-Malades de l'Hôpital Notre-Dame, was founded in 1897.

== Life and work ==
Baptized Marie-Mélodie, she was the daughter of Magloire and Rosalie Langlois. During the Quebec diaspora her parents emigrated to Fall River, Massachusetts, in 1867. On completion of her studies there at the Couvent Jésus-Marie, she became a novice in the Sisters of Charity of the Hôpital Général of Montreal, Quebec, after which she took her vows in 1887.

After working as a bursar for the Grey Nuns, in 1894 she became a nurse at a hospital run by the congregation in Toledo, Ohio, where in 1896 she set up the Grey Nuns' first nursing school. Subsequently, she organized the first French-language nursing school in Canada in 1897, at the École des Hospitalières et Gardes-Malades de l'Hôpital Notre-Dame. She was director of the nursing school (1898–1902), head nurse (1897–1899), superior at Notre-Dame Hospital (1899–1902), assistant general of the Grey Nuns (1902–1907), superior of the vicairie of Ville-Marie (1907–1915), bursar general (1915–1925), and superior in Cambridge, Massachusetts (1925–1926).

In 2009, the Mailloux Pavilion at Notre-Dame Hospital was commemorated as a site of Canadian historical significance.
