= Hôpital Notre-Dame =

- CIUSSS du Centre-Sud-de-L’Île-de-Montréal
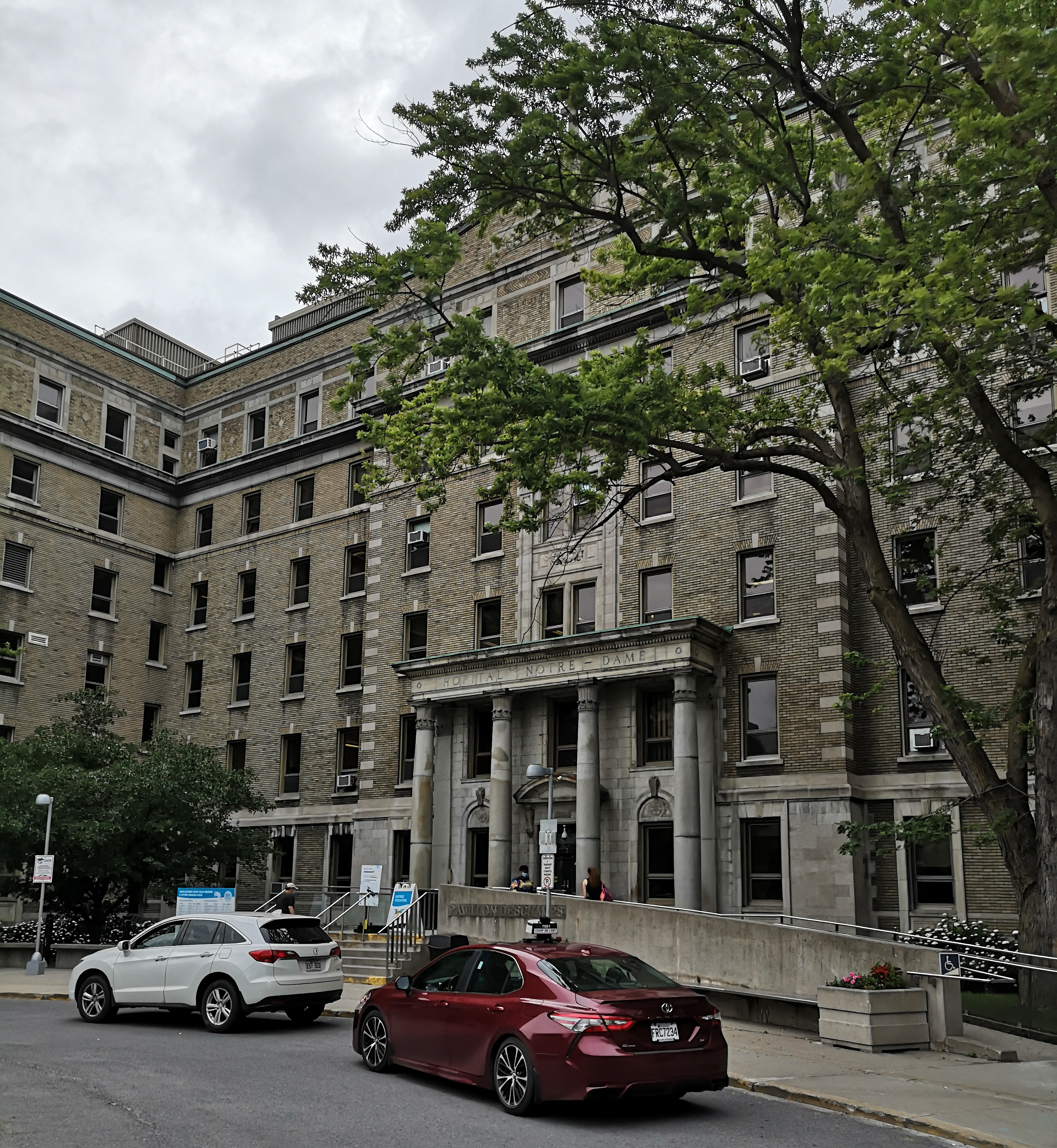

Geography
- Location: 1560, rue Sherbrooke Est; Montreal, Quebec; H2L 4M1
- Coordinates: 45.526°N 73.564°W

Organisation
- Care system: RAMQ
- Type: Teaching
- Affiliated university: Université de Montréal Faculty of Medicine

History
- Founded: 1880; 146 years ago Sherbrooke

Links
- Website: https://www.ciusss-centresudmtl.gouv.qc.ca/etablissement/hopital-notre-dame

Hôpital Notre-Dame (English: Notre Dame Hospital) is a hospital in Montreal, Quebec, Canada. It is located on Sherbrooke Street East in the borough of Ville-Marie, across from La Fontaine Park. It was established in 1880, and has been at its present site since 1924.

== Services ==
Hôpital Notre-Dame is a general hospital offering a range of services to the local community including a 24-hour emergency department, radiology (MRI, CT scan, Radiography, and Ultrasound), day medicine (blood test center, nursing services), cardiology, electrophysiology, neurology, ENT, audiology, ophthalmology, gynecology, occupational therapy, physiotherapy and pediatrics. Given its location in the heart of Montreal, the hospital also offer comprehensive treatment for drug and alcohol dependence (both in and outpatient).

== History ==
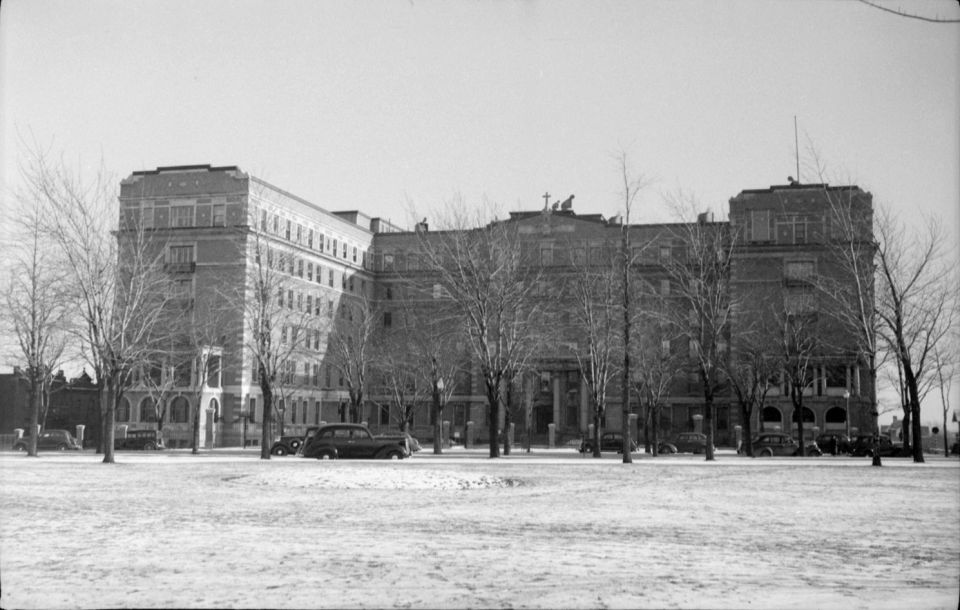
Hôpital Notre-Dame in 1937

Around 1880, Université Laval à Montréal decided to found a hospital. The secretary of Université Laval à Montréal, Dr. Emmanuel Persillier-Lachapelle, was given the mandate to establish the new health institution, assisted by the Sulpician Victor Rousselot, parish priest of Notre-Dame, as well as Mother Julie Haineault-Deschamps, of the Congregation of the Grey Nuns. Hôpital Notre-Dame opened on July 27, 1880, housed on the former premises of Donegana's Hotel on Notre-Dame Street.

From the beginning, the hospital was a secular institution. It was administered by physicians rather than priests, which was considered innovative for its time. In the late nineteenth century, Hôpital Notre-Dame became one of the largest hospitals in the country, with six specialized departments: general practitioners, surgery, psychiatry, otolaryngology, ophthalmology and electrotherapy.

In 1898, sister Élodie Mailloux founded the first French Canadian nursing school at the hospital. During its existence, the school trained over 3000 graduates. The first surgical intervention in Canada under aseptic conditions was conducted at Hôpital Notre-Dame in 1899. Hôpital Notre-Dame has been associated with Université de Montreal since its establishment in 1920. In 1924 the Hôpital Notre-Dame moved to its current location on Sherbrooke Street.

In 1996, the merger of the Hôtel-Dieu de Montréal, the Hôpital Notre-Dame and the Hôpital Saint-Luc followed the creation of the Centre hospitalier de l’Université de Montréal (CHUM). With the completion of the CHUM megahospital in 2017, Hôpital Notre-Dame was converted into a community general hospital serving downtown.

=== 1934 strike ===
On 14 June 1934, the internes at Notre-Dame commenced Canada's first medical strike to protest the appointment of a "Hebrew", Dr. Sam Rabinovitch, to the staff. Dr. Rabinovich was the highest ranking graduate of his class from the Université de Montréal, and was offered the position of chief intern. In early June 1934 a petition signed by doctors and interns of Notre-Dame was submitted to the hospitals board, requesting that the contract between the Hospital and Rabinovich be "broken". After a lengthy deliberation by the hospital board it was decided to uphold the contract and hire Rabinovitch

Thirty-two resident doctors walked off the job rather than work with Rabinovich, and by 17 June the strike had expanded to include interns from five other Montreal hospitals, with nurses threatening to join the strike. Quebec Nationalist groups and media such as The Saint-Jean-Baptiste Society and Le Devoir quickly backed the striking internes.

"In view of the distressing, serious and dangerous condition to which the patients of the Nôtre-Dame and other hospitals have been exposed because of the refusal of a number of their internes to take orders from their superiors and the embarrassment that the various boards of Nôtre-Dame and other hospitals, I feel it my duty as a Physician to tender my resignation as interne to your hospital."

— Samuel Rabinovitch excerpt Letter of Resignation.

Rabinovitch formally resigned from his position on 18 June. The culmination of this and other antisemitism events led the Jewish community in Quebec to establish their own hospital. Funds for the new Jewish General Hospital were obtained through charitable drives headed by Allan Bronfman, Sir Mortimer Davis and J.W. McConnell from the Jewish and Protestant communities.

== Pavillon Mailloux ==
The Pavillon Mailloux is a five-story brick nurses’ residence on the campus of the Hôpital Notre-Dame. It was constructed as a purpose-built residence in 1931. It was designated as a National Historic Site of Canada on November 23, 1997 in commemoration of the growing professionalism of nursing and the expanding role of women in health care.

== Gallery ==
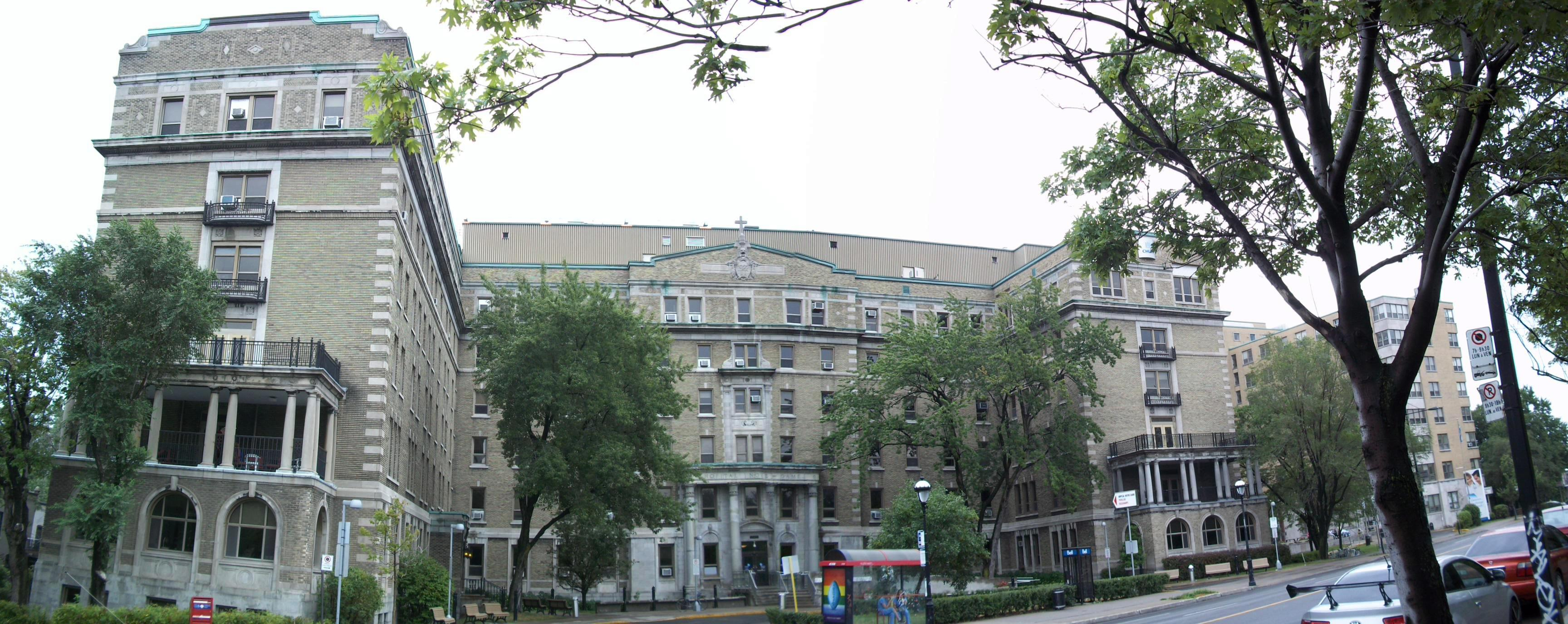
Panorama

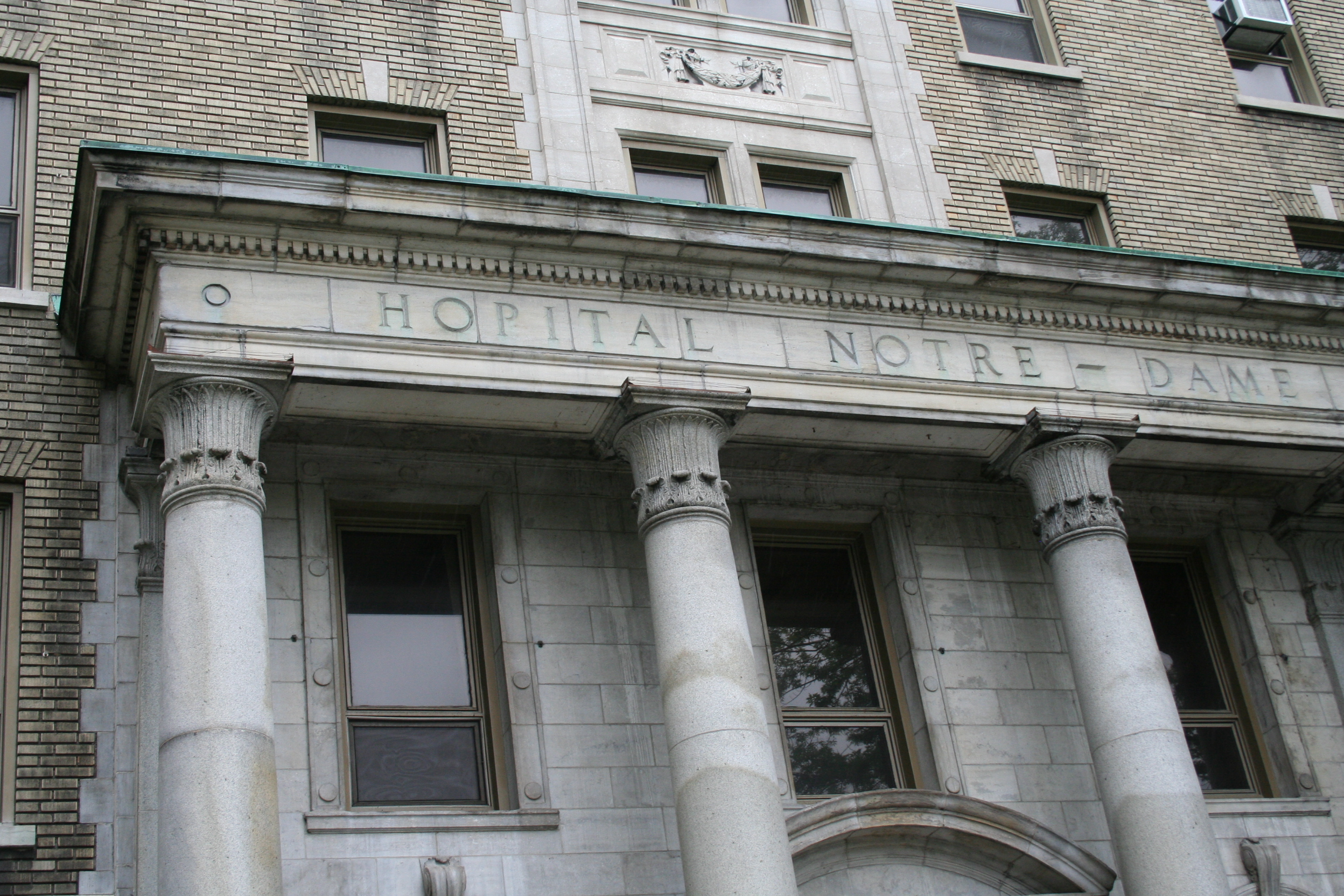
Entrance of Pavillon Mailloux

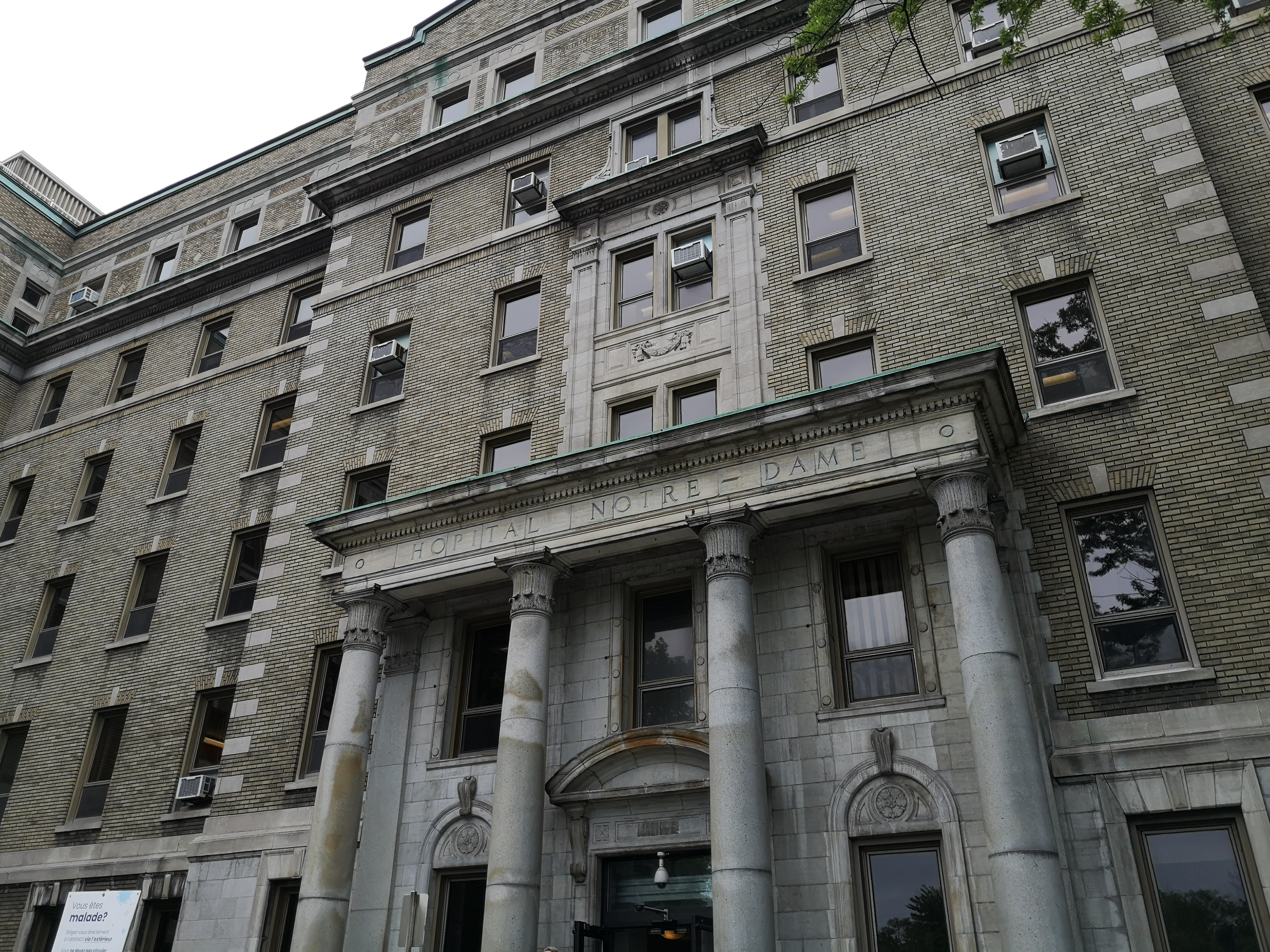
Entrance of Pavillon Deschamps
