= St. Boniface Industrial School =

Defunct Canadian residential school

- St. Boniface, Manitoba

Information
- Religious affiliation: Presbyterian
- Established: 1890
- Closed: 1905

St. Boniface Industrial School was a Canadian Indian residential school that operated in what is now the St. Boniface neighbourhood of Winnipeg, Manitoba from 1890 to 1905. The school was built with funds from the Government of Canada and was operated by Archdiocese of Saint-Boniface and the Grey Nuns of Manitoba. The Oblates took over operation of the school in 1896. The school was situated on Des Meurons Street. Situated on 40 acres (160,000 m^{2}) of land, some bush and some cultivated, the school was a mile from the Town of St. Boniface and two miles from Winnipeg.

In addition to academic training, the school provided students with vocational training. Male students were taught trades such as carpentry, blacksmithing, or shoe repair and female students were taught domestic skills like housekeeping, wool carding, sewing, and cooking. Hands on experience with farming was limited to gardening due a lack of land for the type or farm operations in place at other schools. Recreational facilities at the school were lacking. In his submission for the 1896 Indian Affairs Annual Report Principal John Ashby indicated that there was no yard or recreation space for the girls and that the recreation room for the boys was "far too small".

School officials struggled with student recruitment and by 1902 it was clear St. Boniface needed to be replaced with schools on reserves. The school was closed in 1905 due to low enrollment. The Executive Summary of the Truth and Reconciliation Commission of Canada linked low school attendance at the turn of the century to parental acts of resistance: "Prior to 1920, when the Indian Act was amended to allow Indian Affairs to compel children to attend residential school, the most effective form of resistance that parents could make was to simply refuse to enrol their children."

Following the closure of the school the building was used a juniorate. It burned down in 1911 and the exact location of the building is unknown due to development of residential and commercial areas.

== Principals ==
- Father Ambroise Comeau (1890-1896)
- Father Jean-Baptiste Dorais (1896-1903)
- Unknown (1903-1905)
