= Marguerite-Thérèse Lemoine Despins =

Marguerite-Thérèse Lemoine Despins (March 23, 1722 – June 6, 1792) was a mother superior of the Sisters of Charity of the Hôpital Général of Montreal.

== Biography ==
Marguerite-Thérèse was the daughter of René-Alexandre Lemoine, dit Despins, and of Marie-Renée Le Boulanger.

Marguerite-Thérèse Lemoine Despins's upbringing shaped her future. Her mother had died and, at her own request, she was placed in the care of Marie-Marguerite d'Youville. She was placed by Marguerite d'Youville in the Sisters of Charity's house as a boarder in 1739. This allowed her to grow up within the religious community and observe the charitable work. Both of these would be key to her life's work.
