= Thérèse-Geneviève Coutlée =

Canadian nun

Thérèse-Geneviève Coutlée (November 23, 1742 – July 17, 1821) was a mother superior of the Sisters of Charity of the Hôpital Général of Montreal. She was succeeded by Marie-Marguerite Lemaire after her death.
