= Grey Nuns' Hospital =

Building in Quebec, Canada

- Ancien hôpital général de Montréal (or Hôpital des Sœurs Grises)
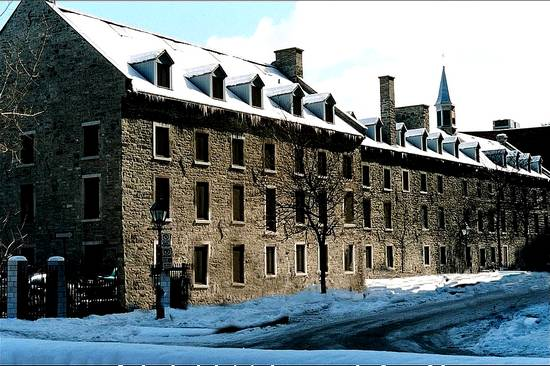
- Grey Nuns' Hospital in 2009

General information
- Architectural style: Early French Canadian architecture
- Location: 138 Saint-Pierre Street, Montreal, Quebec, Canada
- Coordinates: 45°30′01″N 73°33′17″W
- Year built: 1765
- Owner: Sisters of Charity of Montreal

National Historic Site of Canada
- Official name: Grey Nuns' Hospital National Historic Site of Canada
- Designated: 1973

Patrimoine culturel du Québec
- Official name: Ancien hôpital général de Montréal
- Type: Classified heritage immovable
- Designated: 2013

The former Montreal General Hospital, also known as the Charon Brothers' General Hospital, or Grey Nuns' Hospital, is a former hospital and charitable institution located in Old Montreal. Founded in 1694 by François Charon de La Barre and the Brothers Hospitallers of the Cross and St. Joseph, or Charon Brothers, it is considered Montreal's first charitable institution, whose mission was to care for the poor, the sick, the elderly, orphans and the most vulnerable members of colonial society.

Following the decline of the Charon Brothers' community in the early 18^{th} century, the institution was entrusted in 1747 to the Sisters of Charity of Montreal, more commonly known as the Grey Nuns, under the leadership of Marguerite d'Youville. They reorganized the hospital, ensuring its continuity and development for over a century. Under their administration, it became one of Montreal's leading welfare institutions and played an essential role in caring for the destitute. Operations were gradually transferred to a new facility beginning in 1871, and the old hospital closed its doors in 1880.

The hospital's remaining buildings are now recognized as a major site in the social, religious and hospital history of Quebec. Along with Saint-Sulpice Seminary, it is one of the two most important architectural complexes dating back to the French Regime in Montreal. It has since been designated a heritage site by the governments of Canada and Quebec.

Located south of Place d'Youville and west of Saint-Pierre Street, it remains closely associated with Marguerite d'Youville's memory, who was canonized in 1990 and is recognized as one of the founding figures of charity in Canada.

== History ==
=== Foundation by François Charon de La Barre ===
François Charon de La Barre (1654-1719) was a prominent figure from Montreal, who financed fur-trading ventures. In 1687, he fell seriously ill and prepared for his death, but after regaining his health, he decided, at the age of 33, to give his life a new meaning. He thus devoted himself to charitable works and founded a home to welcome the elderly and the destitute, along with a community of brothers to care for them. He associated himself with other well-known figures such as Pierre Le Ber (the son of Jacques Le Ber and brother of Jeanne Le Ber), Jean-Vincent Le Ber Du Chesne and Jean Fredin, who were driven by the same aspirations.

François Dollier de Casson, as the superior of the Sulpicians in Montreal, owners of the island, initially granted them one arpent at the Pointe-à-Callière, outside the city's walls, in 1688. Minutes from a 1690 survey show that by then, 9 arpents of land had been granted for the General Hospital's use.

The four associates wished to found an institution for men on the property. To do so, Charon de La Barre set aside his former ventures and began overseeing the construction of the hospital. Meanwhile, in 1691, one of the associates, Le Ber Du Chesne died. He bequeathed a substantial sum to his three colleagues so that they might continue their mission.

On 23 October 1692, the three remaining associates obtained from François Dollier de Casson another grant of 10 arpents and 9 perches of land, whose deed specified that it was intended to support their project to establish, on the outskirts of Montreal, a residence dedicated to assisting those in need. On the same day, Dollier de Casson also granted them a second parcel of 3 arpents and 3 perches located between the St. Lawrence River and the St. Pierre River, near governor Louis-Hector de Callière's garden.

=== The hospital's first building ===
Construction of the new hospital began in 1692. It would have two stories, with an attic covered by a mansard roof. Built of stone, the building was 90 feet wide and 30 feet deep, with two wings attached to it, both 30 feet wide, who were reserved for the community and the poor. It had 24 rooms, in addition to services areas and vaulted cellars. In 1694, it welcomed its first resident, Pierre Chevalier.

The General Hospital (circa 1747)

The Brother Hospitallers made further land acquisitions over the years. In 1693, Jacques Le Ber, on behalf of Pierre Le Moyne d'Iberville, sold Charon de La Barre an estate on the Pointe-à-Callière. A few months later, Louis Geoffroy, the parish priest of La-Prairie-de-la-Madeleine, sold a 50 arpents plot located, along with communal rights, on the Côte Saint-Lambert, along the south shore of the St. Lawrence River. In 1694, Louis Le Conte Dupré and his wife, Catherine Saint-Georges, also sold to Charon de La Barre and his associates a 100 arpents plot along the St. Pierre River.

A church, built between 1695 and 1697, along with a school for orphans, a brewery, a cider press, a small factory and a windmill rounded out the General Hospital's complex. During that period, Charon de La Barre established several small industries on the institution's grounds.

=== The Brothers Hospitallers of the Cross and St. Joseph ===
In 1694, the Bishop of Quebec, Jean-Baptiste de La Croix de Chevrières de Saint-Vallier, authorized the Brothers to live in community. His decision received Louis XIV's approval and the Charon Brothers received their letters patent later that same year. Charon de La Barre and his brothers devoted themselves wholeheartedly to their mission. As early as 1699, their efforts were recognized by the governor of Montreal, Louis-Hector de Callière, and by Intendant Jean Bochart Champigny, who both praised the institution.

In 1700, the King granted them an annual subsidy so that they could continue their activities. Bishop Saint-Vallier also wished to establish the Brothers Hospitallers as a true religious community, in accordance with canon law. In 1702, six brothers took their religious vows and chose to wear black habits. The French Secretary of State of the Navy, Jérôme Phélypeaux de Pontchartrain, opposed this decision and forced the brothers to adopt secular attires which led to several departures within the small community.

In 1707, Charon de La Barre returned to France to defend his community's position before the King. Meanwhile, in 1708, the Brothers Hospitallers started to think about expanding their educational efforts to rural areas throughout the colony. In 1717, Intendant Michel Bégon de la Picardière offered them his support. The Charon Brothers finally obtained new letters patent from the King in 1718, along with an increase in royal grants which made possible for Charon de La Barre to hire new schoolteachers. Charon de La Barre's successes were only temporary, as the new recruits did not stay for long with the community. In 1719, he therefore returned to France to find others.

=== The death of the Charon Brother's founder and the hospital's bankruptcy ===
Charon de La Barre died at sea on his way to France, aboard the ship Le Chameau, in July 1719. Before his death, he named Louis Turc de Castelveyre, a schoolmaster he had hired, as his executor. Shortly after his arrival in Montreal, Turc de Castelveyre was appointed as superior of the Brothers Hospitallers, which now numbered only five members. According to the hospital's inventory at that time, it also housed ten poor elderly people, an orphan named Pierre along with a child. It had 11 beds with straw mattresses and blankets, all in poor condition. The clothing available was also of poor quality. In the hall, there was a large table, six benches, an iron stove with a chimney, a fire shovel, a lectern, a bucket and one pewter cup.

Pierre François Xavier de Charlevoix, a Jesuit priest and historian, summarized in 1721 the difficult situation in which the Brothers Hospitallers found themselves during that period. Although Charon de La Barre had done a lot for the community during his lifetime, their schoolmasters were still not well established throughout the colony's parishes, and they still faced prohibition from the King against wearing religious habits and vows, which hindered their work. In fact, the Brothers Hospitallers had only founded six school at that time (at the General Hospital, Pointe-aux-Trembles, Boucherville, Longueuil, Batiscan and Trois-Rivières).

Turc de Castelveyre held his position until 1728. His tenure was marked by significant and persistent financial difficulties which hindered the development of the General Hospital. In 1723, the Brothers Hospitallers' rule was finally approved. Despite recruitment efforts to increase their ranks, they continued to struggle to retain members, with many of them quickly leaving. By 1731, the community no longer had a schoolmaster. They had also lost the annual stipend the King had granted them. Burdened by debts, lawsuits and heavy financial obligations, they no longer had the resources to recruit new brothers.

Over the years, the situation further deteriorated. By 1747, the Charon Brothers only consisted of two elderly brothers, Jean Jeantot and Joseph Delerm, who cared for only four elderly men housed at the General Hospital. After having managed Montreal's first hospice for several decades, they asked to be relieved of their duties.

=== The Grey Nuns' administration ===
Marguerite d'Youville, foundress of the Grey Nuns

The Sulpicians, who had first ceded the land intended for the hospital's use to Charon de La Barre, took steps to ensure that Marguerite d'Youville and the Sisters of Charity of Montreal, also known as the Grey Nuns, would be entrusted with the institution's management. On 27 August 1747, it was thus transferred to the new community.

The Grey Nuns, however, inherited an institution that was heavily indebted and in poor condition. Despite these difficulties, Marguerite d'Youville moved in on 7 October with her companions. She immediately set about repairing and refurbishing the premises. Previously reserved exclusively for men, the hospital now opened its doors to both sexes, as well as disabled soldiers, unwed mothers, abandoned infants, orphans and slaves. Under Mother Youville's leadership, the General Hospital significantly expanded its mission to assist the most destitute of Montreal's society.

=== Merging the General Hospital ===
Correspondance between Marguerite d'Youville and Intendant Bigot (16 February 1751)

As King Louis XV wanted to reduce the number of new religious communities in New France, Intendant François Bigot issued an ordinance in October 1750 which stripped the Grey Nuns of their management of the General Hospital and ordered its merger with the Quebec General Hospital, which was administered by the Canonesses of St. Augustine.

Marguerite d'Youville vigorously opposed this decision by drafting a petition in which she outlined the many improvements made to the institution since she had taken over in 1747. She also pledged to pay off all the debts left by the Charon Brothers. At the same time, she tried to have Intendant Bigot's ordinance overturned by the King.

In 1751, a ruling by the royal council finally overturned it and mandated that a contract be drawn up with the Grey Nuns for the administration of the General Hospital. On 14 December of that same year, another order revoked the merger of the two general hospitals and confirmed Marguerite d'Youville as the sole administrator of the institution. Finally, on 28 September 1752, a contract largely based on Marguerite d'Youville's petition set forth the terms for the administration of the General Hospital.

=== The War of Conquest ===
Accounts of the General Hospital, 1747-1779

Once the General Hospital's situation had been stabilized, Marguerite d'Youville began planning its development. Her plans included the expansion of the hospital and the construction of a new chapel. Just as the institution's debts were finally settled, in 1756, the Seven Years' War broke out. The Grey Nuns soon began taking in soldiers from the French and British armies. Located between the groves of Pointe-Saint-Charles and the fortifications of Montreal, the General Hospital often found itself in the middle of skirmishes between the two armies. Despite the dangers, the Grey Nuns continued their charitable works, albeit with increasing difficulties.

After the British victory in New France, several sources of income disappeared. To ensure the survival of the congregation, Marguerite d'Youville had to rely on other resources, such as the generosity of the hospital's numerous benefactors and the incomes derived from the Grey Nuns' lands. During the war, the General Hospital had supplied Intendant Bigot with large quantities of provisions for the French army. In return, payments were made in paper currency. By the end of the conflict, the debt owed to the hospital for these supplies amounted to nearly 120,800 livres. When New France surrendered in 1760, the institution found itself in a precarious financial situation, heavily dependent on France's capacity to repay these debts. The Grey Nuns had to wait until the signing of the peace treaty in 1763 to obtain news on their reclamations. Shortly thereafter, paper currency suffered a significant devaluation, considerably reducing the amounts they were owed and exacerbating the General Hospital's financial difficulties.

=== The 1765 fire ===
Painting by sister Marie-du-Rédempteur of the 1765 fire (1929)

On 18 May 1765, a great fire ravaged the General Hospital and a large part of Montreal. Of the hospital's original buildings, only the walls reportedly remained. The disaster left the Grey Nuns and the 17 boarders, 63 poor people and 16 orphans they cared for homeless. The Hôtel-Dieu took them in temporarily. The General Hospital was soon rebuilt on the same land according to the characteristics of French architecture at that time, with thick walls of rough stone covered with plaster. A second story was reportedly added to the main building. Its architecture was highly utilitarian and quite rudimentary, featuring little ornamentation. The new gabled roof prevented snow from accumulating during the winter, and the roof structure, less massive, posed lower fire risks.

Following the fire, Étienne Montgolfier, the superior of the Sulpicians, advanced 15,000 livres to the Grey Nuns to fund the reconstruction of the hospital. Thanks to his assistance, the work progressed quickly, and seven months after the fire, the community was able to return to the hospital. In June of the same year, Marguerite d'Youville also acquired the seigneurie of Châteauguay, in a bid to provide the community with another source of income while helping to supply the hospital with food to feed its residents.

Despite the hardships endured in previous years, Mother d'Youville tirelessly continued her work. In 1770, one year before her death, the General Hospital was home to 18 nuns, fed nearly 170 peoples and provided for another 150. These figures attest to the scale the institution had reached under her leadership and the significance of her charitable work.

=== Expansion during the 19^{th} century ===
Deed of sale of the seigniory of Châteauguay (1765)

The General Hospital experienced a period of significant growth during the early 19^{th} century. Repairs were needed to maintain the old 18^{th} century building, and these changes would alter its appearance considerably. From 1820 to 1823, the congregation's wing was renovated. From 1831 to 1833, the chapel also underwent renovations. It was extended and a new sacristy was added. The walls and roofs were raised, the windows enlarged, the chimneys rebuilt, and the interior of the building completely remodeled. A new wing for the poor was also built, while the two older wings were joined together to form the wing inhabited by the sisters.

The expansion continued with two extensions to the latter, in 1847 and again in 1851. These transformations marked the peak of the building's development. However, as early as 1854, the Grey Nuns began to consider selling the hospital along with its land in Old Montreal. In 1861, they acquired land from the Sulpicians at the corners of Guy Street and Dorchester Boulevard, where they planned to build a new motherhouse better suited to their needs. They were, in fact, seeking to escape the floods to which they were frequently exposed, like the one in 1789.

=== Leaving for the new Motherhouse ===
The General Hospital's rear courtyard (1867)

In 1871, the sisters moved into their new motherhouse on Guy Street, which brought the old hospital's original mission to an end. In 1872, to generate rental income from their property, the Grey Nuns had part of the complex demolished, including the chapel. The City of Montreal acquired part of the land to allow for the construction of Saint-Pierre and Normand Streets, which brought this area, long situated on Montreal's outskirts, into its urban core.

=== Warehouse rental (1872-1979) ===
Warehouses at the Pointe-à-Callière (ca 1940)

The Grey Nuns retained ownership of the remaining buildings, whose use was transformed with the construction of a warehouse in 1874. Smaller buildings were added, as well as an extension in 1880. The older buildings were also modified and rented to various companies, including the Dominion Wire Rope Company (1885-1955), Saint-Arnaud et Bergevin (1936-1967) and Monstad & Company (1940-1964).

=== The Grey Nuns' return at the end of the 20^{th} century ===
In 1964, Old Montreal was designated a historic district. The Grey Nuns began to consider returning to their original motherhouse. Major renovations on the building, carried out by the company Desnoyer Mercure et associés were undertaken in 1979 and 1980, with a new building being added to the complex. The nuns returned to the former hospital in 1981, a century after they had left it. The building was renamed Maison de Mère d'Youville. However, the sisters do not live there anymore. Instead, they reside in the Angus residences, in the Rosemont-La Petite-Patrie borough.

=== An important heritage site ===
The old General Hospital, now the Grey Nuns' Motherhouse (2015)

In 1981, the former hospital was designated a National Historic Site of Canada by the Government of Canada. Similarly, in 2012, the Government of Quebec issued a notice of intent to designate it as a cultural property, citing its architectural importance, its archeological significance and its place in the development of Montreal.

== Architecture ==
Along with the Saint-Sulpice Seminary, the General Hospital is the only convent building in Montreal dating from the French Regime. It houses the only surviving example of a complete 17^{th}-century kitchen, as well as a vaulted cellar.

== Bibliography ==
Deslandres, Dominique; Dickinson, John A.; Hubert, Ollivier (2007). Les Sulpiciens de Montréal. Une histoire de pouvoir et de discrétion, 1657-2007 (in French). Montréal: Fides.

Des Rochers, Jacques; Pothier, Louise (1999). Caractérisation de l'ancien Hôpital Général et des collections des Sœurs Grises de Montréal: étude en vue de rapatrier le patrimoine youvillien dans le Vieux-Montréal (in French). Montréal: Sœurs Grises de Montréal.

Ferland-Angers, Albertine (1961). "Une femme a passé...". Rapport - Société canadienne d'histoire de l'Église catholique. 28: 37–44.

Ferland-Angers, Albertine (1969). "Charon de La Barre, François". Dictionary of Canadian Biography.

Gosselin, Auguste (1895). "Les Jésuites au Canada. Le P. de Bonnécamps, dernier professeur d'hydrographie au Collège de Québec avant la Conquête (1741-1759)". Délibérations et mémoires de la Société royale du Canada. 2 (in French). 1: 25–61.

Imbeault, Sophie (2013). Imbeault, Sophie; Vaugeois, Denis; Veyssière, Laurent (eds.). "Que faire de tout cet argent de papier? Une déclaration séparée au traité de Paris". 1763. Le traité de Paris bouleverse l'Amérique (in French). Québec: Septentrion: 142–199.

Lacelle, Claudette (1979). "Dufrost de Lajemmerais, Marie-Marguerite (Youville)". Dictionary of Canadian Biography.

Lahaise, Robert (1980). Les édifices conventuels du Vieux-Montréal. Aspects ethno-historiques (in French). Montréal: Hurtubise HMH.

Mathieu, Jacques (2013). Deschênes, Gaston; Vaugeois, Denis (eds.). "Charles-Madeleine Youville-Dufrost et sa mère Marguerite d'Youville". Vivre la Conquête à travers plus de 25 parcours individuels (in French). Québec: Septentrion: 232–236.

Têtu, Henri (1889). Les évêques de Québec (in French). Québec: Narcisse-S. Hardy, éditeur.

Trudel, Marcel (1956). L'Église canadienne sous le Régime militaire, 1759-1764 (in French). Vol. 1. Montréal: Institut d'histoire de l'Amérique française.

Rapport de l'Archiviste de la province de Québec (in French). Québec: Louis-A. Proulx, Imprimeur de sa Majesté le Roi. 1924.

"L'Hôpital général des Frères Charon, aujourd'hui Maison de Mère d'Youville à Montréal". Encyclopédie du patrimoine culturel de l'Amérique française (in French).
