= Emmanuel-Persillier Lachapelle =

Dr. Emmanuel-Persillier Lachapelle
- Born: 21 December 1845; Sault-au-Récollet, Montreal, Quebec
- Died: 1 August 1918 (aged 72); Rochester, Minnesota
- Burial place: Montreal, Quebec
- Occupation: Physician
- Known for: Founder of Hôpital Notre-Dame

Emmanuel-Persillier Lachapelle (21 December 1845 – 1 August 1918) was a Canadian physician and founder of the Hôpital Notre-Dame in Montreal, Quebec.

== Biography ==
Lachapelle was born on 21 December 1845 in Sault-au-Récollet to Pierre Persillier, dit Lachapelle, and Zoé Toupin. He attended the Petit Séminaire de Montréal, followed by the Montreal School of Medicine and Surgery. Upon graduating in 1869, he began working as a physician at the Hôtel-Dieu de Montréal.

In parallel with his medical career, he was editor of L'Union médicale du Canada from 1876 to 1877. He joined the editorial committee from 1878 to 1882.

In 1878, his career as a physician brought him to teach to medical students at the Université Laval de Montréal. He later became dean of this university's faculty of medicine in 1908.

On 27 July 1880, he officially founded Hôpital Notre-Dame in Montreal, Quebec. In 1899, the hospital acquired an X-ray machine, and a radiology suite was built.

Lachapelle died on 1 August 1918 in Rochester, Minnesota, and was buried in Montreal a few days later.
