= Grey Nuns =

Canadian Roman Catholic religious institute

- Sisters of Charity of Montreal
- Marguerite d'Youville, foundress of the Grey Nuns
- Abbreviation: S.G.M.
- Founded: 31 December 1737; 288 years ago
- Founder: Marguerite d'Youville
- Type: Religious congregation
- Legal status: active
- Purpose: Public advocation, education, and network
- Headquarters: Montreal, Quebec, Canada
- Region served: Canada; United States; Brazil
- Services: Charity and hospital work
- Official language: English; French
- Website: www.sgm.qc.ca

The Sisters of Charity of Montreal, more commonly known as the Grey Nuns, are a female religious congregation and an institute of pontifical right specialized in charity and healthcare. They are among the pioneers of social services and nursing not only in Montreal but also in Canada and the Northeastern United States, where they have founded numerous institutions.

Founded in Montreal by Marguerite d'Youville in 1737, they faced difficulties early on before being entrusted with the management of Montreal's General Hospital by the authorities of New France in 1747. Under their leadership, the hospital, initially reserved for men, opened its doors to women, young girls, orphans, abandoned infants, soldiers, slaves and even prostitutes.

Heavily affected by the British conquest of New France in 1760, the Grey Nuns faced significant financial and material difficulties at the end of the 18th century. They subsequently experienced significant growth during the mid-19th century, in the midst of the Catholic revival that swept through Montreal at that time. This revival, marked by a steep rise in religious vocations, enabled the Grey Nuns to expand first in Montreal, where they established numerous charitable foundations, and then elsewhere in Canada, leading to the foundation of independent congregations still existing today. They also took part in missions in Western Canada, where they administered several schools and hospitals.

The Grey Nuns continued their missionary work during the early 20th century, in South America and Africa. They however experienced a marked decline in the second half of the 20th century due to the Quiet Revolution and the nationalization of healthcare and social services in Quebec which followed. This in turn lead to the closure of several of their charitable institutions and the transfer of their hospitals to the provincial government.

While they greatly contributed to the development of healthcare, education and social services in Canada, the Grey Nun's legacy is now criticized by those who view their past involvement in Canada's residential school system as harmful.

== Founding of the Grey Nuns and growth during the French Regime ==
=== Founding by Marguerite d'Youville ===
Following her husband François-Madeleine d'Youville's death in 1730, Marguerite d'Youville experienced a spiritual crisis which considerably deepened her devoutness. Encouraged by the Sulpicians, who were then lords of the island of Montreal, she became a member of several lay confraternities, leading to the development of her desire to do charitable work.

In 1737, Marguerite welcome into her home in Montreal her first boarder, Françoise Auzon, an elderly, blind widow. In the following months, three other women, Marie-Louise Thaumur de La Source, Catherine Cusson and Marie-Catherine Demers Dessermont, guided by the same desire, joined Marguerite. Together, on 31 December 1737, they secretly took their religious vows. They did so without having obtained sanction from King Louis XV, who sought to limit the establishment of new religious congregations. This date marks the foundation of the Sisters of Charity of Montreal. On 1 January 1738, they drafted their first religious rule on loose sheets of paper. They later moved with their boarders to a larger house on Notre-Dame Street known as the Le Verrier house. The small community then supported itself with the money it earned from odd jobs such as sewing.

The sisters were nicknamed the "Grey Nuns" because they wore grey habits similar to those of the Recollects. Since the Middle Ages, there have also been communities of beguines in northern France, in Flanders and on the Holy Roman Empire. Like the Sisters of Charity, they were often widows or unwed women without formal religious vows who took care of the poor and the sick. They were often nicknamed "grey nuns" themselves.

Engraving of Marguerite d'Youville and the first Grey Nuns receiving their habits (1854)

In Montreal, the Grey Nuns initially faced some prejudice from the inhabitants of Montreal. Marguerite d'Youville's first biographers, her son Charles-Marie-Madeleine d'Youville (also known as Charles d'Youville Dufrost) and Antoine Sattin, would later allude to this poor perception. They also noted that the sisters were called "les grises" (grey being a French colloquialism for tipsy) because it was rumored that they were drunkards and that they sold brandy to the First Nations, just as Marguerite's husband had done. This antipathy can also be explained in part by their close ties to the Sulpicians, who had strained relations with the residents of Montreal and the rest of the clergy in New France.

In 1738, the Sulpicians sought to entrust the Grey Nuns with the management of Montreal's General Hospital, an institution founded in the 17th century by the Brother Hospitallers of the Cross and St. Joseph (also known as the Charron Brothers or Frères Charron in French) and which then faced significant financial difficulties. Opposition from the city's governor and several prominent figures in Montreal society, including military officers and merchants who had appealed directly to the French Secretary of State of the Navy, caused this plan to fail.

During the same period, between 1738 and 1744, judicial archives from Montreal show that the Grey Nuns had to file legal proceedings against delinquent debtors on sixteen different occasions. This may as well have contributed to the negative perception among the city's residents toward the new congregation, whose founder was determined to ensure that their rights were respected. The survival of this mission, however, depended on such rigorous financial management.

=== Taking over the General Hospital ===
The early years of the Grey Nuns were difficult, which slowed considerably their growth. Catherine Cusson, one of the foundresses, died of tuberculosis in 1741. Until 1745, Marguerite d'Youville also suffered from an untreatable knee ailment. In January 1745, a fire destroyed the Le Verrier house. Nevertheless, the community was able to grow, albeit slowly. In 1742, Catherine de Rainville joined the sisters. In 1744, a fifth woman, Thérèse Laserre-Laforme, did the same. Shortly after the 1745 fire, the Grey Nuns signed informal vows of obedience, submission and detachment drafted with the help of the superior of the Sulpicians of Montreal, Louis Normant du Faradon. This document, known as the Engagements primitifs, or "Original commitments", was added to the first rule of 1738.

The Grey Nuns and their boarders moved several times after the 1745 fire. They first lived in a house on Saint-Paul Street lent to them by a merchant, then to a larger house they rented on Notre-Dame Street, near the church of the Recollects, and then in a house which was given to them by the daughter of Claude de Ramezay, a former governor of Montreal and New France. Another merchant, Paul-Alexandre d'Ailleboust, finally rented them a house located on the Place d'Armes.

Drawing of the General Hospital (ca 1747)

In August 1747, Intendant Gilles Hocquart and the Bishop of Quebec, Henri-Marie du Breil de Pontbriand, finally entrusted the Grey Nuns with the management of the General Hospital, which had by then accrued important debts. On 1 September 1747, Marguerite d'Youville entered the hospital along with sisters Marie-Louise Thaumur de La Source, Marie-Catherine Demers Dessermont, Catherine de Rainville, Thérèse Laserre-Laforme and Agathe Véronneau, a novice. They brought with them their boarders, all women of various ages, and found already in the hospital four elderly men. Two of the Grey Nun's younger boarders, Marie-Antoinette Arelle and Marie-Joseph Bénard Bourjoli, took their vows in August 1749, along with Agathe Véronneau.

Shortly after the Grey Nuns took over, the hospital, which until then had only accepted men, began to admit women, disabled soldiers and prostitutes, the latter until around 1765. As early as 1748, it also housed an orphanage known as St. Mathieu. The Grey Nuns' General Hospital was thus primarily residential in nature, unlike the Hôtel-Dieu of Montreal, which was dedicated to healthcare. Throughout its history, it was never a hospital in the modern sense of the term.

Like most religious congregations, as well as some nobles, merchants and military officers during the Ancien Régime, the Grey Nuns owned slaves. At that time, there were six or seven slaves at the General Hospital, including the three Marguerite d'Youville had inherited from her husband. Most of them, however, were themselves patients, either because they had been abandoned by their owners upon returning to France, or because they were disabled, elderly or dying. The congregation itself did not participate in the slave trade. During the 18th century, the General Hospital took in a total of 121 slaves, including 101 from the First Nations and 20 from Africa.

=== Official recognition of the Grey Nuns ===
When they took over the General Hospital, the Grey Nuns still were not officially recognized by the French royal government, despite the efforts of Marguerite d'Youville and the support of the Sulpicians and Bishop de Pontbriand. During that period, they even suffered significant setbacks. In 1748, the new Intendant of New France, François Bigot, considered entrusting the General Hospital to the care of the Religious Hospitallers of St. Joseph, who administered Montreal's Hôtel-Dieu. This plan did not come to fruition, but in 1750, despite the Grey Nun's sound management, the Intendant and Bishop de Pontbriand ordered the merger of the hospital with the General Hospital of Quebec, which was under the care of the Canonesses of St. Augustine of the Mercy of Jesus.

In their struggle for official recognition, the Grey Nuns continued to benefit from the support of the Sulpicians. The residents of Montreal, who by then had come to appreciate them, also opposed the merger. In December 1751, Intendant Bigot's ordinance was revoked by the Secretary of State of the Navy. In May 1752, Louis XV ordered that a contract be drawn up with the Grey Nuns to settle the matter, which was closed four months later, after numerous discussions and negotiations. Furthermore, the congregation finally obtained its letters patent in June 1753. In 1755, during his first visit of the community, the Bishop of Quebec approved the rule of 1737, marking the end of a process that had lasted nearly twenty years.

=== Developments and challenges at the end of the French regime ===
The Grey Nuns' official recognition made recruitment easier. During the following years, several new sisters took their vows, such as Marguerite-Thérèse Lemoine-Despins, who had been living with the community as a boarder since 1739 and who had taken her vows in 1753. Others followed in the next few years: Marie-Joseph Gosselin in 1754, Thérèse Beaufrère in 1755, Marie-Louise Lanouillier de Boisclair in 1756 and Marianne-Claude Varambouville, Marie-Apolline Dussault and Marie-Geneviève Gosselin in 1759.

In order to restore the hospital's finances, the Grey Nuns engaged in trade and odd jobs such as sewing and embroidery. In 1754, they also began to take in abandoned infants. This work, which would later become known as the Crèche d'Youville, or Youville nursery, attests, along with the St. Mathieu orphanage, that childcare was among the congregation's earliest activities, a tradition that would continue well into the 20th century.

In 1755, Montreal was struck by a major smallpox epidemic. For the first time since their foundation, the Grey Nuns took in and cared for the sick. Since they were not cloistered, unlike the Religious Hospitallers of St. Joseph, some sisters were able to provide home care. Others went to care for the Anishinabeg and Nbissing living in the seigniory of Lac-des-Deux-Montagnes, which belonged to the Sulpicians. During the Seven Years' War, the Grey Nuns' General Hospital also took in wounded soldiers, not only French but British as well, for whom an "English room" was set up.

In 1757, the sisters had a wall built around the hospital, which was located outside of Montreal's fortifications. Expansion works began the same year but were quickly halted due to a lack of funds. They would not resume until the following century. The buildings, however, were spared by the war. Even before Montreal's surrender in 1760, the British maintained cordial relations with the Grey Nuns, who were caring for their soldiers, although ultimately the British conquest would mark the beginning of a difficult period for the congregation.

== Under British rule ==
=== Precarious situation at the end of the 18th century ===
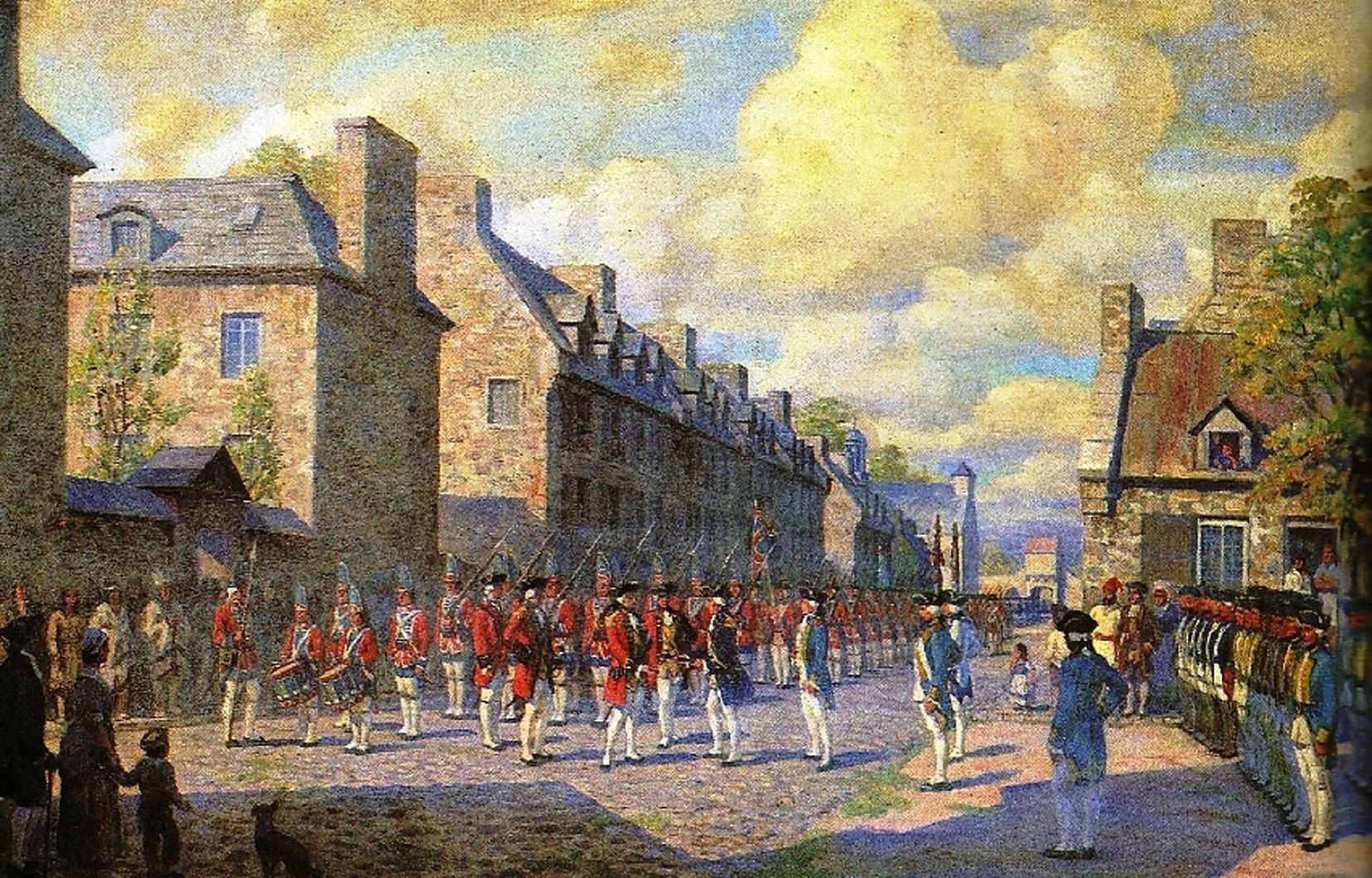
Montreal capitulates (8 September 1760)

The surrender of Montreal to the British in September 1760 marked the end of French rule in New France. From that point on, the Grey Nuns, who had been providing rations and clothing to French soldiers during the Seven Years' War, faced important financial difficulties as they were now deprived of several sources of income. After the conquest, they had to live solely on the income from their lands. However, the congregation managed to recover financially from the situation within a few years. By 1763, at the end of the British military regime, it could technically rely on a surplus of nearly 37,000 livres. However, the French government owed them a substantial sum of 120,800 livres, which was repaid only partially from 1765 onward. That same year, the congregation repurchased the seigniory of Châteauguay from its owner, who was leaving for France.

In May 1765, a major fire ravaged Montreal and destroyed many of its buildings, including the General Hospital, of which only the stone walls, the brewery and the mill remained standing. For a time, the Grey Nuns and their 114 boarders were housed at the Hôtel-Dieu on Saint-Paul Street. The nuns were not able to return to their convent until seven months later, in December, following extensive renovations funded by the Sulpicians, donations from Montrealers and by residents of London as well.

Despite these significant difficulties, the congregation continued to welcome new sisters. Thus, Thérèse-Geneviève Coutlée took her vows in 1764, followed by Marie-Madeleine Pampalon in 1765, Barbe-Françoise Prud'homme in 1766, Marie-Élisabeth Bonnet in 1769 and Catherine-Marie de La Pérelle in 1771. She was the last nun admitted during the lifetime of Marguerite d'Youville, who died on 23 December 1771 following a stroke.

The General Hospital in different phases, between 1785 and 1871

Marguerite-Thérèse Lemoine-Despins was elected to succeed Marguerite d'Youville as superior. She continued the foundress' charitable work and diversified the types of odd jobs offered by the congregation, which enabled the Grey Nuns to provide for themselves and those under their care. Mother Lemoine-Despins also had to resolve legal disputes with the Mohawks of Sault-Saint-Louis, who were contesting the congregation's claim to part of the seigniory of Châteauguay. She then had the manor house on St. Bernard island, a part of the seigniory, rebuilt.

In 1781, the superior of the Sulpicians of Montreal, Étienne Montgolfier, drafted the Grey Nuns' first official constitutions, into which he incorporated the older rules of 1738 and 1745. They were then approved by the Bishop of Quebec, Jean-Olivier Briand. Under these constitutions, the Grey Nuns were not religious sisters but rather formed a community of women who retained their rights and privileges as laypersons. After the sisters of the Congregation of Notre-Dame of Montreal, they became the second congregation to adopt this new model in the colony, which would become widespread throughout the Catholic Church during the 19th century.

The end of the 18th century proved to be another difficult period for the congregation. On 1 January 1789, the Saint-Pierre River overflowed, flooding the General Hospital and isolating it for several weeks. Then, from 1791 onward, the French Revolution also deprived the Grey Nuns of the incomes of the investments they had made in France. In 1792, following the death of mother Lemoine-Despins, Thérèse-Geneviève Coutlée was elected superior.

=== Prosperity and expansion of the General Hospital in the early 19th century ===
After several decades of financial hardships, the Grey Nuns' situation began to improve at the turn of the 19th century. In 1801, the Legislative Assembly of Lower Canada passed a law providing for the payment of renewable annual subsidies to all congregations that chose to care for people with mental illness, as well as funding for the construction of buildings to house them. The Grey Nuns initially accepted this new mission, but the initiative was abandoned around 1837, and the building they built was demolished in 1844.

Beginning in 1820, the Grey Nuns managed to stabilize their financial situation, with the help of the Sulpicians. With the Restoration in France, they were once again able to draw on their incomes from France. The Sulpician Jean Thavenet, who represented the interests of several Canadian religious congregations in London and Paris, sent them nearly 200,000 livres. By 1821, the Grey Nuns' annual revenues amounted to nearly 76,000 livres, compared to 23,000 livres in 1792.

The sisters' newfound financial stability enabled them to carry out substantial work on the General Hospital's buildings: first, repairs and maintenance; then, beginning in October 1822 and continuing over several decades, expansion, new construction and the renovation of the hospital's chapel. By the mid-19th century, the General Hospital consisted of three distinct sections: a wing for the congregation, a chapel, and a wing for the residents and boarders.

Plan of the General Hospital by H.M. Perrault (1868)

At the same time, the congregation itself experienced major growth under the successive leadership of Mothers Marie-Marguerite Lemaire, Marguerite Trottier de Beaubien, Elizabeth Forbes McMullen and Rose Coutlée, who continued the work begun during Marguerite d'Youville's lifetime, such as caring for the poor. By 1840, the community numbered nearly 200 sisters, including 33 professed sisters and novices, who were caring for 297 poor people, 154 infants and approximately 300 orphans.

Among these orphans, many were Irish children whose numbers grew throughout the first half of the 19th century. This immigration from Ireland was driven, among other factors, by the end of the Napoleonic Wars in 1815 and by the Great Famine of 1845. The typhus epidemic that spread throughout Eastern Canada in 1847 also hit Irish immigrants particularly hard, as they had brought the disease with them, leaving many orphans among them.

Religious congregations were heavily involved in managing this epidemic, which claimed the lives of several thousand people in Montreal alone, including around 6000 Irish. The Grey Nuns, along with the Sulpicians, were the first to assist the sick. They volunteered their services to the government, which gladly accepted in order to keep the costs down. The Grey Nuns left the General Hospital not only to provide home care, which they had been doing since the very beginning of the congregation, but also to go to the sheds in the Goose Village, where the authorities were cramming newly immigrated Irish patients. There, they had to face confrontational and even hostile government employees and doctors, most of whom were Protestants. Several Grey Nuns fell ill, and five died. They were therefore gradually replaced by the Sisters of Providence and the Religious Hospitallers of St. Joseph.

== Growth of the Grey Nuns during the second half of the 19th century ==
=== Consolidation of the Catholic Church and the Grey Nuns in Montreal ===
Montreal experienced an important religious revival in the mid-19th century, which coincided with the episcopate of Ignace Bourget. New male religious congregations from Europe established themselves in the city between 1841 and 1847, such as the Missionary Oblates of Mary Immaculate, the Jesuits, the Clerics of St. Viator and the Congregation of Holy Cross. Female congregations were also invited by Bishop Bourget, such as the Society of the Sacred Heart of Jesus and the Congregation of Our Lady of Charity of the Good Shepherd.

In addition, he encouraged Rosalie Cadron-Jetté to found the Congregation of the Sisters of Misericorde to rehabilitate unwed mothers, and worked to establish new congregations elsewhere in the diocese: the Sisters of the Holy Names of Jesus and Mary, founded in Longueuil in 1843, and the Sisters of Saint Anne in Vaudreuil in 1847. Building on the lay work of Émilie Gamelin, Bishop Bourget himself founded the Sisters of Providence in 1843. Like the Grey Nuns, this new congregation was active in the field of social services and experienced, much like them, significant growth from the onset. The 1840s thus marked a major turning point in the development of religious congregations in the province of Quebec, where their number tripled in a merely a decade. Montreal also became at that time the Canada's leading center of charity.

The Grey Nuns greatly benefited from the Catholic revitalization. Their number rose from 33 professed sisters in 1840 to 327 in 1900, an increase of 891%. Religious vocations were until then relatively marginal. During the 1840s, they became much more common within Montreal's three major female congregations (the Congregation of Notre-Dame, the Religious Hospitallers of St. Joseph and the Grey Nuns). This growth may be explained by the fact that religious life offered these women an alternative to marriage, allowing them to enjoy greater autonomy and agency. This rise in vocations also enabled the Grey Nuns to establish numerous new institutions not only in Montreal itself but also elsewhere in the diocese, and even much farther afield, in Western Canada for example.

=== Foundation of new institutions in Montreal ===
Between 1847 and 1848, the Grey Nuns founded two institutions solely dedicated to the Irish: St. Patrick's orphanage, located very close to St. Patrick's church, and St. Brigid's shelter, which took in young Irish girls. They later diversified their activities to servce the elderly, the homeless and the poor among the Irish as well.

In 1854, the congregation took over the management of St. Joseph's hospice, which had been founded a few years earlier by Olivier Berthelet. Under its stewardship, the facility housed an orphanage, a residence for the elderly and a daycare center. Offering to care for children of working mothers was a novelty in mid-19th century Montreal. This initiative, conceived by the Sulpician Benjamin-Victor Rousselot, opened its doors in 1859 and was entrusted to Sister Julie Gaudry.

The facilities managed or founded by the Grey Nuns were located in various working neighborhoods in the western part of Montreal. Almost all of them also served diverse populations. They often provided the surrounding community with charity distribution centers, where families could pick up clothes, food and other necessities. The sisters also frequently visited poor families and ensured they received the services they needed, such as medications and access to doctors, job referrals and sometime even housing for elderly or disabled family members.

Children at St. Joseph's hospice (1896)

In the midst of the Industrial Revolution, during a time of mass immigration to Montreal, the congregation thus expanded its work to include families in need. At the same time, it increased its capacity to care and provide shelter for the most vulnerable groups like the children and orphans, the elderly and the données, or "given", young girls abandoned at the General Hospital to be trained in domestic duties by the Grey Nuns.

St. Joseph's hospice's success was resounding, its daily attendance raising from 33 children in early June 1859, when it first opened, to nearly 300 in July. In the decades that followed, the Grey Nuns founded four other daycare centers, or salles d'asile, in the working-class districts of Montreal. Despite precarious funding, these institutions proved extremely popular, with a combined annual enrollment reaching 1854 children in 1897.

However, following the death of both Sister Gaudry and the Sulpician Rousselot, and as a result of changes in these neighborhoods, the daycare centers closed their doors one after another between 1902 and 1922. Montreal's demographic growth and the increasing poverty of its residents during the Industrial Revolution also led to a steep rise in the number of infants admitted to the General Hospital, many of whom were born to unwed mothers. In the society of that time, such mothers could not keep their children, as doing so was considered shameful. In the 1860s alone, for example, no fewer than 5904 infants were abandoned to the Grey Nuns' care. Their number continued to rise thereafter, well into the 20th century.

Nazareth Institute (ca 1920)

In 1861, the Sulpician Rousselot entrusted the Grey Nuns with the administration of a new institution dedicated to the blind, modeled after the Institute for Blind Youth (which became the National Institute for Blind Youth) in Paris. The Nazareth Institute, which shared its premises with the Nazareth hospice, welcomed its first boarders in 1862. There, they were housed, educated and cared for by the sisters, who taught them to read and write Braille. The Grey Nuns were the first to do so in North America. The Institute, which still exists today, under the name Institut Nazareth et Louis Braille, was the first rehabilitation center for people with visual disabilities in the province of Quebec.

Another important institution, St. Charles' hospice, was founded in 1877 conjointly by the Sulpicians, the Society of St. Vincent de Paul and the Grey Nuns. This facility primarily housed homeless elderly people. It moved in 1879 to more spacious premises before being expropriated in 1894 by the Canadian Pacific Railway, which was then building Viger train station. Most of the female residents were relocated to the General Hospital, and most of the men had to be placed elsewhere.

After the closure of the hospice, the Grey Nuns remained in the neighborhood, where they purchased three houses and opened a soup kitchen with the support of the Society of St. Vincent de Paul. They provided shelter to a few men who had previously been residents at the former hospice and provided the homeless with meals. They also visited and assisted families in the area. In 1904, the soup kitchen closed its doors as well. The Sulpicians then founded St. Antoine's hospice and entrusted its management to the Grey Nuns once again. In 1910, the hospice's outreach program gained some autonomy and took the name of Vestiaire des pauvres, which roughly translates to "Poors' locker room". Not only did it serve as a clothing bank but also as a soup kitchen. In 1970, it became known as the Accueil Bonneau, in memory of Sister Rose-de-Lima Bonneau, who had been its driving force until 1934. Like the Nazareth Institute, it still exists to this day.

=== Commitment to healthcare ===
Until the later part of the 19th century, the Grey Nuns' work had fallen under what is called social services today. At that time, the congregation started to expand into the field of healthcare and nursing. In addition to the care the sisters provided during the numerous epidemics of typhus, cholera and smallpox that struck Montreal throughout the 19th century, they founded some of the city's most important healthcare centers.

Notre-Dame Hospital (ca 1930)

For example, beginning in 1873, the Nazareth Institute started to operate as a clinic for the treatment of otorhinolaryngological diseases, with one of Quebec's pioneer of ophthalmology, Dr Louis-Édouard Desjardins, serving as its consultant. In 1892, the clinic was converted into a small hospital, which the Grey Nuns administered for several decades. This specialized institution became an important source of revenue for the congregation, as care was provided to patients for a fee. This enabled the sisters to support Nazareth Institute's other activities, such as a new program added in 1917 which aimed at training in various manual trades young boys with visual impairments.

Beginning in 1880, the Grey Nuns started to consolidate their presence in the field of medical care in Montreal, where there were at the time only two genuine hospitals : the Hôtel-Dieu and the Montreal General Hospital, which, not to be confused with the Grey Nuns', had been founded in 1821 to care for the city's English-speaking population. In 1880, Dr Emmanuel-Persillier Lachapelle, secretary of what would become the University of Montreal, which was at that time merely a branch of Laval University, secured the support of the Sulpicians to found a new hospital: Notre-Dame Hospital. This new institution was to provide medical students with clinical facilities capable of accommodating them, which the Religious Hospitallers of St. Joseph had denied them due to their agreement with the Montreal School of Medicine and Surgery, a rival institution. The Protestant and English-speaking General Hospital could also only serve as a temporary solution, and so a new hospital was erected, whose creation also made it possible to meet the needs of a rapidly growing population, especially in the working-class neighborhoods in the eastern parts of Montreal.

Notre-Dame Hospital was founded in the former Donegana's Hotel on Notre-Dame Street, where it remained until 1924, after which it moved to its current location on Sherbrooke Street, across La Fontaine Park. It was the first secular French-speaking hospital in North America. Its board of directors wanted to entrust its internal management to the Grey Nuns, who accepted for two reasons: first, because it aligned with their mission, and secondly, because they would not have to raise the funds needed for its operation themselves. This marked the first time the congregation had administered a facility it did not own itself. In addition to managing the hospital, the sisters also ran its pharmacy.

The Grey Nuns themselves founded another hospital, the much smaller St. Camille Hospital, between 1885 and 1886, during an important smallpox outbreak. It was merged with Notre-Dame Hospital in 1896 and from then was used to treat patients with contagious diseases. In 1898, Sister Élodie Mailloux also founded Canada's first French-language nursing school at Notre-Dame Hospital, which marked the beginning of the professionalization of nursing in the province of Quebec.

=== Expansion within the diocese of Montreal ===
The Grey Nuns' new Motherhouse (1871)

The Sisters of Charity's prosperity during the second half of the 19th century enabled them to expand elsewhere in the diocese of Montreal. In 1859, they opened the Lajemmerais hospice in Varennes, which included a boarding school, a day school, a residence for the elderly and an infirmary. In 1868 and 1869, the congregation founded St. Jean's hospice in Saint-Jean-sur-Richelieu, as well as St. Joseph's hospice in Chambly. A few years later, in 1876, they also founded St. Antoine's hospice in Longueuil. In 1888, at the invitation of vicar Antoine Labelle, the "King of the North", they settled in Saint-Jérôme to open another hospice. Throughout these new institutions, they adopted the same multi-use model as their hospices in Montreal.

This expansion did not slow down developments within Montreal. In 1889, the congregation took over the management of the Catholic Orphanage of Montreal. In 1895, at the Sulpicians' request, it agreed to administer the Patronage d'Youville, which housed young women and trained them as domestic servants.

=== New motherhouse and the formation of a group of lay sisters within the congregation ===
During the 19th century, the Grey Nuns' General Hospital, located in the older part of the growing city, progressively became too cramped for the community and its many residents. Furthermore, repeated flooding of the Saint-Pierre River had rendered both the main building and its outbuildings unfit for habitation. In 1861, the Grey Nuns purchased a plot of land known as the Mont Sainte-Croix from the Sulpicians, in what is now Downtown Montreal, at the corner of Guy and Dorchester Streets. Construction began in 1868 and continued through 1871, the year the congregation moved to its new motherhouse, built according to plans by architect Victor Bourgeau. The old hospital's residents - abandoned infants, orphans and the elderly - followed the nuns. A last Mass was celebrated in the chapel of the old hospital on 28 October. A month later, on 22 November, the bodies of the deceased sisters, including Marguerite d'Youville's, were exhumed and transferred in the new motherhouse's crypt. The old building, which remained the congregation's property, was partially demolished to make way for commercial spaces rented by the sisters.

The Grey Nuns had been taking in young girls since its early days. By the end of the 19th century, several of them were performing domestic duties within the congregation. Some of them aspired to religious life but faced opposition from a few sisters because of their backgrounds and lack of education. A first step to resolve the situation was taken in 1889, when the congregation authorized some girls to form an association called the Petites Sœurs Auxiliaires, or Little Auxiliary Sisters. In 1904, at the Vatican's request, they were formally integrated within the congregation as lay sisters. These developments coincided with the opening of the cause for the canonization of Marguerite d'Youville, which was introduced by Pope Leo XIII in 1890.

=== The Grey Nuns in Quebec and Canada ===
The 1840s were also marked by significant growth for the Sisters of Charity in the province of Quebec. During that period, because of the growing number of vocations, they were able to begin their missionary work in other dioceses. Between 1840 and 1851, the Grey Nuns established sister congregations in Saint-Hyacinthe, Quebec City and Bytown (which later became Ottawa).

In order to maintain unity among these various new congregations, the Grey Nuns convened a general chapter in 1849. This chapter granted the congregation's general council the right to visit all the houses they had founded, regardless of the diocese in which they were located, a decision that the bishops of Quebec and Kingston immediately rejected. At the time, each bishop was keen to closely supervise the congregations established in his diocese, a stance which was reaffirmed at the first provincial Council of Quebec, convened by Bishop Pierre-Flavien Turgeon in 1851. This led the sister congregations to become independent of the Grey Nuns in the 1840s and 1850s.

During that period, the congregation's institutionalization continued its course. A biography of Marguerite d'Youville was published in 1852, written by the Sulpician Étienne-Michel Faillon, which contributed to her fame. Ten years later, in 1862, Pope Pius IX granted the Grey Nuns a Decretum laudis and formally approved their constitutions three years later, in 1865. Thanks to this, as they now fell under the Pope's direct authority, the Grey Nuns would now be able to establish themselves in other dioceses without fear that the local bishop would require the formation of a new congregation under his own authority.

==== Foundation of the Sisters of Charity of Saint-Hyacinthe ====
In 1838, the parish priest of Saint-Hyacinthe, Édouard Crevier, began construction of the city's Hôtel-Dieu to provide care for the poor and the sick. Upon completion, in 1840, he asked the Grey Nuns to manage the new hospital. The superior, Mother Marguerite-Dorothée Trottier de Beaubien, agreed to send volunteers. So soon after Lower Canada rebellion of 1837-1838, the sisters were reluctant, having never ventured so far from the General Hospital. Nevertheless, four nuns volunteered, including Sister Marie-Michel Archange Thuot, and left Montreal by boat on 6 May 1840. Shortly after their arrival, the sisters decided to establish a permanent presence, and a daughter congregation was formed, with Mother Thuot elected as its superior. Saint-Hyacinthe's small Hôtel-Dieu, nicknamed the "Yellow House", was then barely furnished.

The Sisters of Charity of Saint-Hyacinthe's early years were difficult due to a lack of resources. Their situation gradually improved in 1848, with the opening of a railroad line between Longueuil and Saint-Hyacinthe, which strengthened the ties between the Grey Nuns and the new congregation. Some sisters, including Mother Honorine Pinsonnault, who had succeeded Mother Thuot in 1850, decided to return to the General Hospital in Montreal. Of the four foundresses, only Mother Émilie Jauron, elected superior in 1854, remained in Saint-Hyacinthe. At that moment, the community became formally became independent from the Grey Nuns.

In 1856, Mother Jauron had the Providence asylum built in order to better care for the poor. She also undertook construction work to add another building to the Yellow House. An orphanage was finally built in 1870. Although Saint-Hyacinthe was spared from the typhus epidemic of 1847, the city was, throughout the 19th century, struck by cholera, smallpox, meningitis and typhoid fever. The Sisters of Charity of Saint-Hyacinthe, much like their counterparts in Montreal, were deeply committed to fighting these diseases and caring for their victims.

In the final decades of the 19th century, the Sisters of Charity of Saint-Hyacinthe experienced significant growth. They agreed to take over the Sorel General Hospital in 1862. They also opened several facilities in the Richelieu valley, in Marieville, Saint-Jean-sur-Richelieu and Saint-Denis-sur-Richelieu. They took charge of schools in Marieville, Sherbrooke and Farnham as well. They were even present in Lewiston, Maine, where they had been invited by Father Pierre Hevey, himself a native of Saint-Hyacinthe. At that time, it was home to an important French-Canadian community. Lewiston, where they arrived in 1878, proved to be the congregation's entry point into the United States. In the following years, they expanded their presence throughout New England, where they contributed to the development of healthcare and social services. In 1881, they arrived in Holyoke, Massachusetts. They also settled in Manchester, New Hampshire, in 1885 and then in Berlin in 1905. In 1943, they opened a mission in Haiti, where they are still active as of today.

===== Foundation of the Sisters of Charity of Nicolet =====
Nicolet's Hôtel-Dieu (ca 1940)

In 1886, the Bishop of Saint-Hyacinthe, Louis-Zéphirin Moreau, and the first Bishop of Nicolet, Elphège Gravel, called upon the Sisters of Saint-Hyacinthe to build and manage Nicolet's Hôtel-Dieu. After some initial difficulties, Sister Aurélie Crépeau, later known as Mother Youville in honor of the foundress of the Grey Nuns, became the first superior of the Nicolet congregation. When they arrived, the sisters opened a novitiate and began providing home care to the population while awaiting the Hôtel-Dieu's construction, which was opened in 1889.

In 1898, the sisters opened a new hospice in Saint-Célestin, then founded a hospital in Drummondville a few years later, in 1910. During that period, they established several institutions throughout the province, including one in La Tuque in 1913 and another in Amos in 1930. At the same time, they began their expansion across Canada. Sisters from Nicolet traveled to southern Alberta in 1893 to open two schools and a hospital to care for people from the First Nations. They also established a presence in Saskatchewan in 1923, in Ontario in 1929 and in the Northwest Territories in 1931.

Upon his election in 1939, Pope Pius XII expressed his desire for the various congregations of Grey Nuns in North America to be reunited as one. The Nicolet sisters were the only ones to agree. They merged with the Sisters of Charity of Montreal in 1941 and Nicolet's Hôtel-Dieu became one of the Grey Nuns' provincial house.

==== Foundation of the Sisters of Charity of Ottawa ====
A Grey Nun of the Cross at Notre-Dame-du-Sacré-Cœur Convent (ca 1860)

In 1844, the coadjutor bishop of Kingston, Patrick Phelan, invited the Grey Nuns to settle in Bytown (which later became Ottawa). At the time, the city's Catholic population was underserved, as there were no hospital, no school and no welfare institutions. Shortly after their arrival, Bishop Bourget of Montreal authorized the sisters of Bytown, led by Mother Élisabeth Bruyère, to establish other communities within the diocese of Kingston. The new congregation was canonically erected by Bishop Phelan in April 1845 and became independent from their sisters in Montreal. Initially governed by the Grey Nuns' rule, the Sisters of Charity of Ottawa, also known as the Grey Nuns of the Cross, adopted a new rule in 1856, although the latter was in keeping with Marguerite d'Youville's memory. In 1885, a few years after Mother Bruyère's death, the Sisters of Charity of Ottawa received their Decretum laudis from Pope Leo XIII.

In March 1845, the sisters opened a school, which also admitted protestant children. It established its convent in a small house, near where, in May, they opened a small hospital which, unlike the one in Montreal, was intended not only to shelter the poor and infirm but also to provide health care. This facility would later become the Ottawa General Hospital. It was expanded in 1866. Like their sisters in Montreal, Bytown's Grey Nuns cared for the sick, who they visited and cared for in the sheds set up along the Ottawa River to house the sick or poor immigrants. They were deeply involved in managing the 1847 typhus epidemic. They did the same during the smallpox outbreak in 1871, opening St. Anne's hospice for this purpose.

The sisters' work expanded considerably throughout the decades that followed. They moved into a more spacious convent in 1850 and converted their first motherhouse into a boarding school. An orphanage was built in 1868, and in 1867 they converted a recently purchased hotel into a new boarding school. A third boarding school was founded in 1871 in the former Notre-Dame-de-la Merci convent. Under the leadership of Mother Bruyère, the Grey Nuns of the Cross also expanded outside of Bytown. In 1848, they opened a boarding school and a school near Cornwall. In 1857, they also opened a school in Buffalo, New York. Sisters from Ottawa also assisted the Missionnary Oblates of Mary Immaculate in ministering to the Cree and Anishinabeg of Témiscamingue (Québec) and Timiskaming (Ontario). During her lifetime, Mother Bruyère oversaw the founding of nearly 25 institutions in Ontario, Quebec, and the state of New York, thanks to funding from the Church.

In the early 20th century, two autonomous congregations broke away from Ottawa: the Grey Nuns of the Sacred Heart, who settled in Philadelphia in 1921, and the Grey Nuns of the Immaculate Conception, who settled in Pembroke in 1926. As these two new congregations were forming, the Ottawa sisters began to expand into Abitibi, where they founded Rouyn's first hospital.

==== Foundation of the Sisters of Charity of Quebec ====
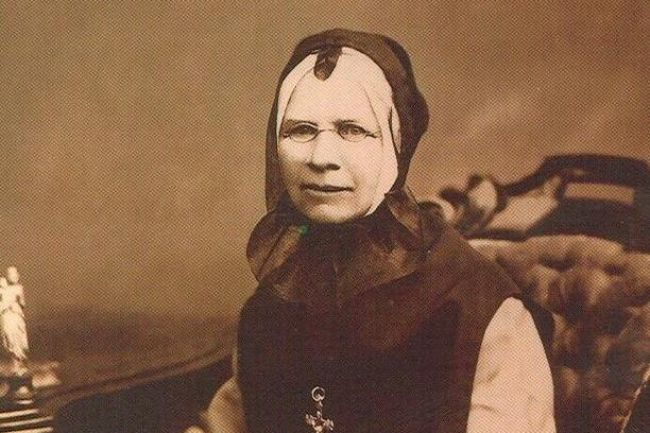
Mother Marie-Anne-Marcelle Mallet, foundress of the Sisters of Charity of Quebec

In August 1849, the coadjutor bishop of Quebec, Pierre-Flavien Turgeon, entrusted the Grey Nuns with the management of an orphanage which until then belonged to Quebec City's Society of Charitable Ladies. That same year, the congregation became independent. Mother Marie-Anne-Marcelle Mallet became the first superior of the new Sisters of Charity of Quebec. The nuns first distinguished themselves during the typhus epidemic of 1851 and the cholera outbreak of 1854. Like their sisters in Montreal, they also took private boarders, most often elderly or infirm men and women, as well as the destitute and the sick, in addition to providing education for poor young girls in Quebec City. Over time, they established several important institutions in the city. In particular, they opened an orphanage in a former military barrack. At the end of the 19th century, they opened the Saint-Louis-de-Gonzague boarding school. They were also present on the city's north shore and in the Beauce region, as well as in the Bas-Saint-Laurent and Gaspésie regions. In 1893, they took over the management of the Beauport asylum, which cared for people with mental illnesses.

The Sisters of Charity of Quebec followed the Grey Nuns' rule until 1863, when Archbishop Charles-François Baillargeon imposed upon them a rule inspired by that of the Society of Jesus, which was drafted by the Jesuit Antoine-Nicolas Braun. He did so despite Mother Mallet's opposition, who was not reelected as superior in 1866. That same year, the Sisters of Charity of Quebec received their Decretum laudis from Pope Pius IX. In 1871, sisters from Quebec also traveled to Rimouski to provide care during a typhoid fever epidemic. The city's bishop, Jean Lanvegin, wanted them to open a permanent hospice there. In accordance with the congregation's constitutions, this new community immediately became independent. The Sisters of Charity of Rimouski were canonically erected in July 1874. Two years later, in 1876, they founded an orphanage in Rimouski's oldest stone church and then built a convent in 1879. The convent also welcome retired priests, the elderly and orphans.

The Sisters of Charity of Quebec are still active today, despite the closure of many of their institutions. They are also found in the United States, Japan, the Democratic Republic of Congo and South America (Paraguay, Uruguay, and Argentina).

=== Expansion in Western Canada ===
In 1843, the auxiliary bishop of Quebec, Joseph Norbert Provencher, a leading figure in the colonization of Western Canada, asked for Grey Nuns to be sent to the Red River colony, in present-day Manitoba. Mother Elizabeth Forbes McMullen accepted his request and, in October 1843, approved the foundation of a general hospital in St. Boniface which, like Montreal's, would provide care for the poor, the disabled, the sick as well as education for young people, including Métis, Nakawēk (or Saulteaux) and Sioux. Sister Marie-Louise Valade, who was put in charge of the new foundation, arrived in the Red River colony with three sisters in June 1844, after a arduous journey by canoe. The nuns initially lived in a dilapidated house which belonged to Bishop Provencher, where they provided care and education to the local population. They were later welcomed into the bishop's residence while awaiting the construction of a proper convent. After construction was delayed by a measles epidemic, the Grey Nuns moved into an unfinished convent in 1847. Constructions lasted until 1851.

In 1845, the community welcomed its first local novice, a Métis woman named Marguerite Connolly. Two novices later arrived from Montreal. The following year, two more sisters joined the mission. The small group was quickly overwhelmed by their work. When she traveled to Montreal to attend the congregation's 1849 general chapter, Mother Valade requested reinforcements. She returned with two new sisters, which enabled her community to establish a mission and a school in St. François Xavier in 1849.

Two more nuns and a novice arrived from Montreal in 1853. Pursuant to the decrees of the second provincial Council of Quebec in 1854, Archbishop Ignace Bourget reorganized the congregation and granted the Red River mission its autonomy, thereby cutting off its reinforcement, which deprived the Greys Nuns in Western Canada of their main source of recruitment. To compensate, the Sisters of Charity of Ottawa agreed to lend two sisters to Mother Valade's congregation.

This decision was reverted a few years later, in 1858, when the union between the sisters in the Red River colony and Montreal was renewed. The Grey Nuns in Western Canada would thus never become independent from the congregation in Montreal. Mother Valade, who once again travelled to Montreal in 1858 for the general chapter, was able to bring back six new sisters. This influx of sisters made it possible to establish another mission in St. Norbert in 1858 and a school in St. Vital in 1860, which later became a boarding school and then a sanatorium.

Regina's Hospital, Saskatchewan (ca 1910)

Upon Mother Valade's death in 1861, the Western Canada congregation numbered 21 nuns, who cared for four sick people, 44 orphans and 63 schoolchildren in St. Boniface, St. Francois Xavier, St. Norbert and St. Vital. In 1871, the Grey Nuns founded a small hospital, which is now known as St. Boniface Hospital, the first in Western Canada. It was expanded in 1877. To address the shortage of hospital beds in the region, the sisters had a 60-bed hospital built in 1887, which was subsequently expanded and modernized throughout the following decades. A second institution, St. Roch Hospital, opened in St. Boniface in 1895 to care to patients with contagious diseases. Other facilities opened their doors in the city or the surrounding area between the late 19th century and early 20th century.

The Red River mission also served as the starting point for the Grey Nuns' westward expansion. In 1858, sisters from Montreal stopped for a few days in St. Boniface while on their way to establish a mission at Lac Sainte-Anne, west of present-day Edmonton, in Alberta. In 1863, they left Lac Sainte-Anne for St. Albert, where they founded a convent the following year. From there, the Grey Nuns spread throughout the rest of modern-day Alberta, Saskatchewan and eventually the Northwest Territories, where they assisted the Missionary Oblates of Mary Immaculate in their evangelization efforts.

A classroom at the Sacred Heart Residential School, Brocket, Alberta

By the end of the century, the Grey Nuns were running several of the Oblates' residential schools in Western Canada, with the financial support of the federal government. These included, in Manitoba, the school of St. Boniface; in Alberta, those in Fort Chipewyan, Lac la Biche, St. Albert; in Saskatchewan, those in Île-à-la-Crosse, Lac la Plonge, Qu'Appelle and Assiniboia; and in the Northwestern Territories and Nunavut, those in Fort Providence, Fort Smith and Fort Resolution, as well as the one in Chesterfield Inlet, Nunavut. They also administered St. Mary's school in Kenora, Ontario.

Catholic authorities in Western Canada then believed they were saving the First Nations from extinction while converting them to Christianity. Following the initial success of the congregations, the federal government, in 1879, considered creating a network of residential schools, intending to entrust its management to the Anglican and Catholic Churches.

This phenomenon is now widely regarded as a policy of aggressive assimilation of Canada's Indigenous peoples. The federal government's true aim was to eradicate the First Nations and acculturate them to Euro-Canadian values rooted in Christianity. Residential schools are now regarded as one of the central elements of a policy of cultural genocide against the Indigenous peoples of Canada, as indicated in the reports of the Truth and Reconciliation Commission. That said, the expansion of the Grey Nuns into Western Canada also provided an opportunity for many First Nations women, especially Cree and Métis women, to become professed nuns, which contributed to the development of an Indigenous Christianity in Canada.

=== Expansion in the United States ===
The second half of the 19th century also marks the beginning of the Grey Nuns' expansion into the United States, which was made possible by the fact the congregation now fell under the Pope's authority. This expansion took place within the broader context of a proliferation of hospitals and charitable institutions founded by female congregations from Quebec in the United States and Canada. In 1855, the Grey Nuns founded St. Vincent Hospital and St. Anthony Orphanage in Toledo, Ohio. In 1868, they also opened an orphanage in Lawrence, Massachusetts. In the following decades, they expanded their presence in New England primarily, by opening healthcare, educational and residential facilities in Boston, Worcester, Salem, Cambridge and Nashua. This trend continued well throughout the 20th century.

== Growth during the first half of the 20th century ==
St. Boniface General Hospital, Manitoba (ca 1950)

The Grey Nuns' archives reveal the full extent of the charitable work they carried in the 19th century: in 1900 alone, they provided shelter to 391 poor people, 1228 orphans and abandoned infants, 87 young girls and 21 female boarders. They provided care to 93,235 sick people and 514 hospitalized patients, while 97 persons with visual impairments attended the Nazareth Institute. The nuns also trained 11 nurses and thanks to their efforts, 644 domestic workers were able to find employment. In addition, they served 37,611 meals to the poor and made 41,974 house visits.

By the early 20th century, the Grey Nuns were in charge of an important network of facilities scattered across Canada, which included 24 orphanages, 14 hospices for the elderly, 10 hospitals, four clinics, ten parish schools, 11 residential schools, eight shelters, four homes for young girls, ten food banks and an institute for the blind. Thirty-three institutions were located outside the diocese of Montreal: three were in the diocese of Valleyfield, 19 in Western Canada, and 11 in the United States. This growth continued throughout the first half of the 20th century, during which the congregation reached its peak membership of 2009 sisters in 1951. This long period of growth stopped towards the end of the 1950s, which coincided with the beatification of Marguerite d'Youville in 1959.

=== The Youville nursery ===
The Youville Nursery (1945)

In the beginning of the 20th century, several of the congregation's institutions still shared facilities. This was the case at the motherhouse, for example, which continued to house several groups with diverse needs, including the nursery's infants. In February 1919, a terrible tragedy struck the community when a major fire at the motherhouse killed 53 children. The Grey Nuns then decided to move the infants to a building they owned on Côte-de-Liesse Road, which opened its doors in 1925 under the name Crèche d'Youville, or Youville nursery. The Crèche shared its premises with the St. Mathieu orphanage, which moved there the same year and became the Notre-Dame-de-Liesse Orphanage.

=== Hospital and healthcare ===
The nursery room at the Youville Nursery

During that period, the Grey Nuns also continued to expand their hospital network. They first opened a sanatorium in Sainte-Agathe-des-Monts in 1914. They also helped establish several major healthcare facilities in Montreal. In 1923, Dr Ernest Gendreau founded the Montreal Radium Institute in the basement of the University of Montreal, then located in the Quartier Latin. Due to its popularity, the Institute started admitting a large number of cancer patients and had to move to more spacious facilities in the Maisonneuve neighborhood. The Institute became independent from the University of Montreal in 1926 and was transformed into a cancer treatment center. In 1927, its management was entrusted to the Grey Nuns of Notre-Dame Hospital. As with their other hospitals, the nuns served primarily as administrators, pharmacists and nurses.

In 1934, the congregation also established the Marguerite d'Youville Institute, which became the first French-language nursing school in Canada with a graduate program. Three sisters were instrumental in its creation: Mother Virginie Allaire, who had been superior of Regina's Grey Nuns Hospital and provincial superior in St. Boniface ; sister Duckett, the director of Notre-Dame Hospital' nursing school ; and sister Fafard, the nursing school's superintendent. Sisters Duckett and Fafard had cofounded in 1923 La Veilleuse, the first French Canadian professional nursing journal. The three nuns, all of whom had extensive experience in nursing, were also involved in teaching the subject at the University of Montreal during the 1920s, where they noted the absence of a graduate program, unlike at McGill University, which had founded its School of Graduate Nurses in 1920. Initially affiliated with the University of Montreal, the school was eventually integrated into the university's structure in 1967, at a time when religious congregations withdrew from Quebec's healthcare sector, and became the Faculty of Nursing. The Grey Nuns were instrumental in the development of nursing not only in the province of Quebec but also in Western Canada and in the United States. They took part in the reform and renewal of nursing in North America and paved the way for lay women in professional nursing.

The recovery room at Maisonneuve-Rosemont Hospita, with sister Annette Paquette (1954)

In 1949, at the request of the provincial Minister of Health, Albiny Paquette, the Grey Nuns agreed to establish a new hospital in the eastern part of Montreal, which at that time had only one small hospital, the Providence Hospital. Maisonneuve Hospital, which later became Maisonneuve-Rosemont Hospital, finally opened its doors in 1954, on a large plot of land owned by the sisters in the Maisonneuve neighborhood. The Grey Nuns played an even more significant role there than they had at Notre-Dame Hospital, because this time they were the direct owners of the new facilities. They were thus directly involved in the planning and construction work and also took part in the process of recruitment. To this end, they contacted the Rockefeller Foundation to learn about the models of hospital management in the United States at that time. Just as they had done at Notre-Dame Hospital, the sisters opened a nursing school and showed themselves to be open to modernizing nursing practices.

Even before the new hospital was completed, the Grey Nuns collaborated with Dr Paul David to found the Montreal Heart Institute, which opened its doors at the same time as Maisonneuve Hospital, of which it occupied the upper floors. They also played an important role within this new medical institution, as sisters served on the board of directors and were involved with patient care.

=== Missions in Canada, Africa and South America ===
As during the last century, the missionary work of the Grey Nuns in Canada continued. After World War II, they established three missions in New Brunswick, where they had arrived following efforts by the secular clergy and the Franciscans. They settled in Baker-Brook, Clair and Saint-Léonard, in Madawaska County. It was one of the congregation's lasting areas of activity, where they remained until 2008, when they left their Notre-Dame de Saint-Léonard residence.

Sister Judith Lauzière at Alcantara's Santa Casa (1965)

Kabba's dispensary, in Nigeria

This period also saw a significant expansion of the congregation outside the country, in response to a major missionary revival launched under Popes Benedict XV and Pius XI. For the Grey Nuns, it began during the interwar period. By 1931, there were 64 nuns serving abroad. Then, in 1957, four sisters from the Nicolet community founded a clinic in Alcântara, Maranhão, where they had been invited by priests from Nicolet. The small Brazilian community, known as the Irmãs de Caridade, then expanded importantly throughout the region until the 21st century. Charitable institutions were established in Guimarães in 1962, in São Luís in 1964, 1976, 1984, 1992, and 1999; in Chapadinha in 1965; in Santa Quiteria in 1987; in São Bernardo in 1989; and in Campestre in 1993. The Grey Nuns also established a mission in the state of Tocantins in 1997. At the same time, in 1977, the Grey Nuns were invited to Colombia by a local charitable association dedicated to abandoned infants. The first sisters arrived in Bogotá in December 1978. Over the years, they founded several institutions in the country.

They also became involved with missionary work in Africa in the mid-1960s. In 1963, nurses arrived in Tunis, Tunisia, where they founded a children's hospital and collaborated with the National School of Public Health on setting up a pediatrics program. In 1971, other sisters travelled to Ngaoudéré, in Cameroon, to teach the local population. At the request of the Bishop of Yagoua, they founded a clinic in 1975 to treat children's diseases such as measles and meningitis. At the same time, other nuns were teaching at a girl's middle school in Egde, Nigeria. Others opened a nursing school in Dungu, Zaire, which remained open until 1986.

== Decline during the second half of the 20th century ==
Religious congregations in Quebec underwent significant transformations since the mid-20th century. They gradually abandoned their religious habits and not only faced a wave of departures but also an important decline in vocations. To address these challenges, they sought to reform their religious life in accordance with the principles of the Second Vatican Council. They did so by holding special renewal chapters.

Like all the other congregations in the Catholic Church at that time, the Grey Nuns sought to return to the motivations of their foundress, Marguerite d'Youville. They revised their constitutions, which were approved by the Sacred Congregation for Religious and Secular Institutes in 1982. Nevertheless, like other congregations, the Grey Nuns experienced a significant decline during the second half of the century, within the context of Quebec's Quiet Revolution and the Second Vatican Council.

The nationalization of health and social services in Quebec culminated with the Hospitals Act of 1962 and the Health and Social Services Act of 1972. Along with the secularization of Quebec's society, this led to an important decline in vocations and numerous departures within the Grey Nuns. Ownership and management of the hospitals were transferred to the Ministry of Health and then to the Ministry of Social Affairs, and orphanages were gradually closed or converted into specialized public institutions.

The birth of Quebec's public healthcare system and the transition from the congregations to the provincial government was generally smooth. In most cases, the government agreed to pay the congregation the value of their real estate, as well as lump-sum payments for the free services they had provided during a period of no more than fifteen years prior to nationalization. For example, when they stepped down from the management of Maisonneuve-Rosemont Hospital, the Grey Nuns received $125,000 to compensate for their work and investments. With medical professionals, however, relations were at times more strained. In Maisonneuve-Rosemont's case, the doctors were relieved by the sisters' departure, as they aspired to play a greater role in management and decision-making, particularly with the aim of transforming the hospital into a research and teaching center.

Despite everything, the Grey Nuns continued to be active in the field of charitable work. For example, in 1977, they helped a group of volunteers establish Maison Marguerite, which to this day provides shelter for homeless women, as well as those struggling with substance abuse and mental issues, and victims of domestic violence. In the United States, they also maintained their presence in the hospital sector. In 1983, in order to ensure the future of their mission, they founded the Grey Nuns Health System, which united their American medical facilities. It was renamed Covenant Health Systems in 1986, when other congregations expressed their interest in joining the organization. In 1995, the Vatican's Congregation for Institutes of Consecrated Life and Societies of Apostolic Life allowed the board to become a public juridic person, according to canon law, with the Grey Nuns staying on it. Their remaining responsibilities were transferred to the board of directors in 2007.

Marguerite d'Youville's canonisation in Rome (1990)

Religious congregations in Quebec experienced a last revival during the papacy of John Paul II, who, beginning in 1980, carried out several beatifications and canonizations of religious men and women from Quebec. Marguerite d'Youville herself was elevated to sainthood in 1990, becoming the first Catholic saint to be born in Canada.

However, this brief revival did not halt the decline of the Grey Nuns, affected by the aging of their sisters and a lack of new recruits. Several scandals, including the residential schools affair, also tarnished the image of the Anglican, Protestants and Catholic Churches in Canada. The Sisters of Charity have been criticized for their participation in the Missionnary Oblates of Mary Immaculate's efforts to evangelize the First Nations in Western Canada, where they administered 19 schools until the 1970s. The sister congregations they founded in Ottawa and Saint-Hyacinthe also took part in the residential schools system. The Ottawa sisters, for example, ran Sainte-Anne school among the Cree of Fort Albany and the Sainte-Thérèse-de-l'Enfant-Jésus school among the Cree of Fort George during the 20th century.

In 1993 it was estimated that there were just under 3,000 Grey Nuns in Canada, mainly in Quebec and Ontario. In March 2013, the Mother House in downtown Montreal was vacated by its remaining Grey Nuns, after having sold the property to Concordia University in 2005. The building was subsequently renovated. The Quebec congregation has not recruited any new members since before 2000. Sister Bernadette said the nuns' legacy will live on in other ways.

== The Grey Nuns today ==
Marguerite d'Youville's sanctuary in Varennes

The Grey Nuns marked another important milestone in their history when they left their motherhouse in the 2010s. This marked their second move since they left the General Hospital in 1871. The community had first considered selling its motherhouse as early as the 1970s. The site had even been purchased by Valorinvest, a Swiss company, in 1974, but the transaction fell through in 1976 after it was designated a heritage site by the Ministry of Cultural Affairs. The congregation again renewed its intention to sell the motherhouse in 2004, at a time where only 600 sisters remained there, even though the buildings could house up to 3000. Concordia University purchased the motherhouse in 2007 and undertook construction work that lasted until 2013, when it was finally converted into student housing.

The transaction posed significant challenges in terms of public health, as the crypt housed the remains of sisters who had died from contagious diseases such in the 19th century. To resolve the situation, the Grey Nuns retained ownership of the crypt, where the sisters remain interred to this day. Marguerite d'Youville's remains, however, were reburied in 2010 in the Basilica of Saint Anne in Varennes, on the twentieth anniversary of her canonization. At the same time, the former General Hospital regained its status as the Grey Nuns' motherhouse. The sisters, for their part, now live in a retirement home in the Rosemont-La Petite-Patrie neighborhood.

Of all the Grey Nuns' foreign missions, only the one in Brazil, now composed almost entirely of Brazilian sisters, and the one in New England remain active today. The mission in Colombia was the most recent to close its doors, in December 2013.

== See also ==
- Marguerite d'Youville
- Grey Nuns' hospital
- Grey Nuns Motherhouse

== Bibliography ==
- Boily, Carole (1998). "Les sœurs grises: des femmes fortes à la colonie de la Rivière-Rouge (1844-1864)" (PDF). Cahiers franco-canadiens de l'Ouest (in French). 10 (1): 33–49.
- Bourbeau, Jean-Pierre (30 December 2021). "Une présence attendue : l'hospice des Sœurs Grises à Saint-Jérôme". Histoire archives Laurentides (in French).
- Castonguay, Thérèse (2002). Formation supérieure des infirmières - Institut Marguerite-d'Youville, 1934-1967 (PDF) (in French). Montréal: Services des archives et des collections des Sœurs de la Charité de Montréal.
- Charest-Auger, Maude (2012). Les réactions montréalaises à l'épidémie de typhus de 1847 (PDF) (master's thesis) (in French). Montréal: Université du Québec à Montréal.
- Charles, Aline; Guérard, François (2012). Thifault, Marie-Claude (ed.). "Les religieuses hospitalières du Québec au XXe siècle: une main-d'œuvre active à l'échelle internationale". L'Incontournable caste des femmes : Histoire des services de santé au Québec et au Canada (in French). Ottawa: 79–102.
- Cross, Suzanne (1977). Lavigne, Marie; Pinard, Yolande (eds.). "La majorité oubliée: le rôle des femmes à Montréal au XIXe siècle". Les femmes dans la société québécoise (in French). Montréal: Boréal Expressl.
- Dagenais, Dominic (19 June 2019). "L'Institut Nazareth et la communauté aveugle de Montréal". Encyclopédie du MEM (in French).
- D'Allaire, Micheline (1993). "L'originalité de l'œuvre sociale des Congrégations Religieuses de Montréal aux XIXe et XXe siècles" (PDF). Études d'histoire religieuse (in French). 59: 25–41. doi:10.7202/1006853ar.
- D'Allaire, Micheline (1997). Les communautés religieuses de Montréal (in French). Vol. 1. Montréal: Méridien.
- Désilets, Andrée (1972). "Mallet (Maillet, Maillé), Marie-Anne-Marcelle". Dictionary of Canadian Biography.
- Duclos, Laurette (1987). "Coutlée, Thérèse-Geneviève". Dictionary of Canadian Biography.
- Dufresne, Olivier. "Early Canadian Oncology: Montréal's Institut du radium". Community Stories (Digital Museums Canada).
- Dumont-Johnson, Micheline (1980). "Des garderies au XIXe siècle: les salles d'asile des Sœurs Grises à Montréal". Revue d'histoire de l'Amérique française (in French). 34 (1): 27–55. doi:10.7202/303836ar.
- Fecteau, Jean-Marie; Vaillancourt, Éric (2006). Deslandres, Dominique; Dickinson, John A.; Hubert, Ollivier (eds.). "La charité en ville". Les Sulpiciens de Montréal : Une histoire de pouvoir et de discrétion, 1657-2007 (in French). Montréal: Fides: 241–264.
- Ferland-Angers, Albertine (1945). Mère d'Youville. Vénérable Marie-Marguerite du Frost de Lajemmerais veuve d'Youville, 1701-1771, Fondatrice des Sœurs de la Charité de l'Hôpital général de Montréal dites Sœurs Grises (PDF) (in French). Montréal: Librairie Beauchemin.
- Gagnon, Claude-Marie (1990). La maison jaune. Les Sœurs de la Charité de Saint-Hyacinthe (in French). Montréal: Fides.
- Gagnon, Serge (1977). "Faillon, Étienne-Michel". Dictionary of Canadian Biography.
- Gauthier, Suzanne (9 January 1991). "Les soins des malades pendant les épidémies" (PDF). Le Courrier de Saint-Hyacinthe (in French).
- Geary, Patricia A. (21 February 2020). "The Beguines of Medieval Europe: Mystics and Visionaries". Grey Nuns of the Sacred Heart.
- Gervais, Diane (2014). "À chacune son rang. Les "filles données" des Sœurs Grises, 1855-1905" (PDF). Revue d'histoire de l'Amérique française (in French). 68 (1–2): 7–23. doi:10.7202/1032017ar.
- Girard, Émilie (6 May 2022). "Au pied de la montagne, l'Hôtel-Dieu de Montréal". Encyclopédie du MEM (in French).
- Giroux, Marie-Christine (2008). "Les salles d'asile à Montréal durant la seconde moitié du XIXe siècle. Quand la représentation de la famille se heurte à la réalité de la classe ouvrière". Revue d'histoire de l'Université de Sherbrooke (in French). 1.
- Gossage, Peter (1987). "Les enfants abandonnés à Montréal au 19e siècle : la crèche d'Youville des Sœurs Grises, 1820-1871" (PDF). Revue d'histoire de l'Amérique française (in French). 40 (4): 537–559. doi:10.7202/304491ar.
- Gossage, Peter (2025). Kin Gagnon, Monika; Webb, Brandon (eds.). "La maison mère des Sœurs Grises: faire face à un lourd héritage". L'Université Concordia: 50 ans d'une histoire collective (in French). Montréal: Concordia University Press.
- Goulet, Denis; Hudon, François; Keel, Othmar (1993). Histoire de l'Hôpital Notre-Dame de Montréal, 1880-1980 (in French). Montréal: VLB éditeur.
- Goulet, Denis (2003). "Desjardins, Louis-Édouard". Dictionary of Canadian Biography.
- Goulet, Denis (2004). L'Hôpital Maisonneuve-Rosemont. Une histoire médicale, 1954-2004 (in French). Québec: Septentrion.
- Goulet, Denis; Gagnon, Robert (2014). Histoire de la médecine au Québec, 1800-2000 : De l'art de soigner à la science de guéri (in French). Québec: Septentrion.
- Goulet, Henri (2016). Histoire des pensionnats indiens catholique au Québec : le rôle déterminant des pères oblats (in French). Montréal: Presses de l'Université de Montréal.
- Grousse, Suzanne (2009–2010). "Marie Catherine Demers Dessermon (1698-1785), cofondatrice oubliée. Interrogations sur le pouvoir d'effacement d'une religieuse montréalaise" (PDF). Revue d'histoire de l'Amérique française (in French). 63 (2–3): 243–273. doi:10.7202/044454ar.
- Guay, Louise (1962). "Mère Élisabeth Bruyère, fille de l'Église et femme d'œuvres" (PDF). Rapport - Société canadienne d'histoire de l'Église catholique (in French). 29: 51–58.
- Guay, Louise (1972). "Bruyère (Bruguier), Élisabeth". Dictionary of Canadian Biography.
- Hébert, Karine (2024). "Un évêque et ses communautés: les relations de Mgr Langevin avec les communautés religieuses féminines (1867-1891)" (PDF). Société canadienne d'histoire de l'Église catholique (in French). 90 (2): 99–119.
- Héroux, Liliane (1969). "Des femmes en gris" (PDF). Sessions d'études - Société canadienne d'histoire de l'Église catholique (in French). 36: 49–65.
- Hudson, Susan (2002). "Les Sœurs Grises of Lewiston, Maine 1878-1908: An Ethnic Religious Feminist Expression". Maine History. 40 (2): 309–331.
- Hudson, Susan (2006). The Quiet Revolutionaries : How the Grey Nuns Changed the Social Welfare Paradigm of Lewiston, Maine. New York: Routledge.
- Imbeault, Sophie (2013). Imbeault, Sophie; Vaugeois, Denis; Veyssière, Laurent (eds.). "Que faire de tout cet argent de papier? Une déclaration séparée au traité de Paris". 1763. Le traité de Paris bouleverse l'Amérique (in French). Québec: Septentrion: 142–199.
- Jean, Marguerite (1977). Évolution des communautés religieuses de femmes au Canada de 1639 à nos jours (in French). Montréal: Fides.
- Kavanagh, Liam. "Montreal and the Irish". Digital History - Histoire Numérique (Université d'Ottawa).
- Keefe, Sr. St. Thomas Aquinas (1942). The Congregation of the Grey Nuns (1737-1910). Washington, D.C.: Catholic University of America Press.
- Lacelle, Claudette (1980). "Lemoine Despins, Marguerite-Thérèse". Dictionary of Canadian Biography.
- Lahaise, Robert (1980). Les édifices conventuels du Vieux-Montréal : aspects ethno-historiques (in French). Montréal: Hurtubise.
- Lalonde-Graton, Micheline (2002). Des salles d'asile aux centres de la petite enfance : la petite histoire des services de garde au Québec (in French). Québec: Presses de l'Université du Québec.
- Lamirande, Émilien (1992). Élisabeth Bruyère (1818-1876): Fondatrice des Sœurs de la Charité d'Ottawa (Sœurs Grises) (in French). Montréal: Bellarmin.
- Lamontagne, Esther; Cohen, Yolande (2003). "Les Sœurs Grises à l'Université de Montréal, 1923-1947 : de la gestion hospitalière à l'enseignement supérieur en nursing". Historical Studies in Education/Revue d'histoire de l'éducation (in French). 15 (2): 237–297.
- Laperle, Dominique (14 May 2022). "La question des esclaves de mère Marguerite d'Youville et de l'Hôpital Général de Montréal dans les notices de Wikipédia". Société canadienne d'histoire de l'Église catholique (in French).
- Laperle, Dominique (4 October 2022). "Figures marquantes de la solidarité : Marguerite d'Youville (1701-1771)". Fondation Lionel-Groulx (in French).
- Laperle, Dominique (2023). "« Porter en notre âme la joie profonde d'être Sœur Grise ». L'expérience émotionnelle de la rénovation des constitutions dans deux congrégations youvilliennes (1959-1982)". Études d'histoire religieuse (in French). 89 (1–2): 79–97. doi:10.7202/1102090ar.
- Laperle, Dominique (2024). "Le cas des foyers et couvent des Sœurs Grises de Montréal au Nouveau-Brunswick (1944-2009) : une patrimoine social en devenir" (PDF). Études d'histoire religieuse (in French). 90 (1): 11–31. doi:10.7202/1111009ar.
- Laperrière, Guy (2013). Histoire des communautés religieuses au Québec (in French). Montréal: VLB éditeur.
- Lapointe-Roy, Huguette (1986). "Le renouveau religieux à Montréal au XIXe siècle, et le rôle des Sulpiciens dans le domaine de l'éducation chrétienne" (PDF). Sessions d'études - Société canadienne d'histoire de l'Église catholique (in French). 53: 51–62.
- Laugrand, Frédéric; Tremblay, Guy (2025). "Les Sœurs Grises autochtones de Montréal. Assimilation et « indigénisation » du christianisme (1845-1960)" (PDF). Revue d'études autochtones (in French). 53 (2): 109–128. doi:10.7202/1116514ar.
- Lessard, Rénald (1989). Se soigner au Canada aux XVIIe et XVIIIe siècles (in French). Ottawa: Presses de l'Université d'Ottawa.
- Lessard, Rénald (1998). Séguin, Normand (ed.). "Les soins de santé au Canada aux XVIIe et XVIIIe siècles". Atlas historique du Québec : l'Institution médicale. Québec: Presses de l'Université Laval: 3–28.
- Loucks, Alanna (5 July 2021). "A Different Road to Sainthood : Building a Religious Community in Eigtheenth-Century Montréal". Borealia.
- Mathieu, Jacques (2013). Deschênes, Gaston; Vaugeois, Denis (eds.). "Charles-Madeleine Youville-Dufrost et sa mère Marguerite d'Youville". Vivre la Conquête : à travers plus de 25 parcours individuels (in French). 1: 244–248.
- Maurault, Olivier (1959). "M. Étienne-Michel Faillon (1800-1870)". Les Cahiers des Dix (in French) (24): 151–167. doi:10.7202/1079949ar.
- Mitchell, Estelle (1987). Les Sœurs Grises de Montréal à la Rivière-Rouge (in French). Montréal: Méridien.
- Mitchell, Estelle (1991). "« Mère à la charité universelle »: Marguerite d'Youville" (PDF). Cap-aux-Diamants (in French) (26): 44–47.
- Moissac, Élisabeth de (1977). "Valade, Marie-Louise, known as mother Valade". Dictionary of Canadian Biography.
- Niessen, Shuana (2017). Shattering the Silence: The Hidden History of Indian Residential Schools in Saskatchewan. Regina: Faculty of Education - University of Regina.
- Nyoumea, Élise-Emmanuelle (2 March 2026). "Les Sœurs Grises au cœur des premiers hôpitaux de Rouyn-Noranda". Le Citoyen (in French).
- Ponton, Reine (1980). "Les débuts de la Congrégation des Sœurs Grises de Saint-Hyacinthe, 1840-1865" (PDF). Sessions d'études - Société canadienne d'histoire de l'Église catholique (in French). 47: 55–61.
- Rimanelli, Nicholas (2019). La maison mère des Sœurs Grises. Un riche patrimoine pour le monde universitaire (PDF) (in French). Observatoire Ivanhoé Cambridge du développement urbain et immobilier.
- Rivard, Marielle; Cantin, Sylvie (1987). 125 ans d'histoire: Hôpital général de Sorel, 1862-1987 (in French). Saint-Hyacinthe: Centre d'histoire de Saint-Hyacinthe.
- Robert, Jean-Claude (1988). "Thavenet, Jean-Baptiste". Dictionary of Canadian Biography.
- Robillard, Denise (18 October 2016). "Figures marquantes de notre histoire : Émilie Gamelin (1800-1851)" (PDF). Fondation Lionel-Groulx (in French).
- Robinaud, Mario (2023). "Des religieuses pour les pensionnats autochtones du Canada (1880-1969). Façonner les individus, réguler les relations entre les sexes". Archive de Sciences Sociales des Religions (in French). 202 (202): 49–70. doi:10.4000/assr.70258.
- Rousseau, Louis; Remiggi, Frank W. (1992). "Le renouveau religieux montréalais au XIXe siècle : une analyse spatio-temporelle de la pratique pascale". Studies in Religion/Sciences Religieuses (in French). 21 (4): 431–454. doi:10.1177/000842989202100405.
- Séguin, Robert-Lionel (1967). "Une Montréalaise devant le tribunal bailliager" (PDF). Les Cahiers des Dix (in French) (32): 109–124. doi:10.7202/1079677ar.
- Swan, Laura (2014). The Wisdom of the Beguines: The Forgotten Story of a Medieval Women's Movement. Katonah, New York: Blue Bridge.
- Tardif, Estelle (2001). Marguerite d'Youville. Le cri des pauvres (in French). Montréal: Bellarmin.
- Trudel, Marcel (1956). L'Église canadienne sous le Régime militaire, 1759-1764 (in French). Vol. 1. Montréal: Institut d'histoire de l'Amérique française.
- Trudel, Marcel (1957). "Le destin de l'Église sous le régime militaire" (PDF). Revue d'histoire de l'Amérique française (in French). 11 (1): 10–41. doi:10.7202/301802ar.
- Trudel, Marcel; D'Allaire, Micheline (2004). Deux siècles d'esclavage au Québec (in French). Montréal: Hurtubise.

=== Primary sources ===
- Constitutions des Sœurs de la Charité administratrices de l'Hôpital général de Montréal, dites vulgairement Sœurs grises (in Latin). Montréal: Imprimerie de l'Hôpital général. 1880.

=== Mediagraphy ===
- "La translation des Restes mortels de sainte Marguerite d'Youville". Patrimoine immatériel religieux du Québec (IPIR) (in French). 8 December 2010.
- "Institutions". Centre d'histoire des régulations sociales (CHRS) (in French).
- "Le site du patrimoine par adresse". Société historique du Marigot (in French).
- "Our history". The Grey Nuns of Montreal.
- "The sisters in America". The Grey Nuns of Montreal.
- "Événements, groupes et personnes". Répertoire du patrimoine culturel du Québec (in French).
- "Reports". National Center for Truth and Reconciliation. 18 December 2020.
- "Centre du patrimoine". Société historique de Saint-Boniface.
- "NWT mission schools". NWT Timeline.
- "Bilan Québec. Site encyclopédique sur l'histoire du Québec depuis 1900". Perspective monde. Outil pédagogique des grandes tendances mondiales depuis 1945 (in French).
- "Terre nourricière. Cultiver, transformer, nourrir". Les Sœurs Grises de Montréal (in French).
- "Heritage & history". Covenant Health.
