= Grey Nuns Motherhouse =

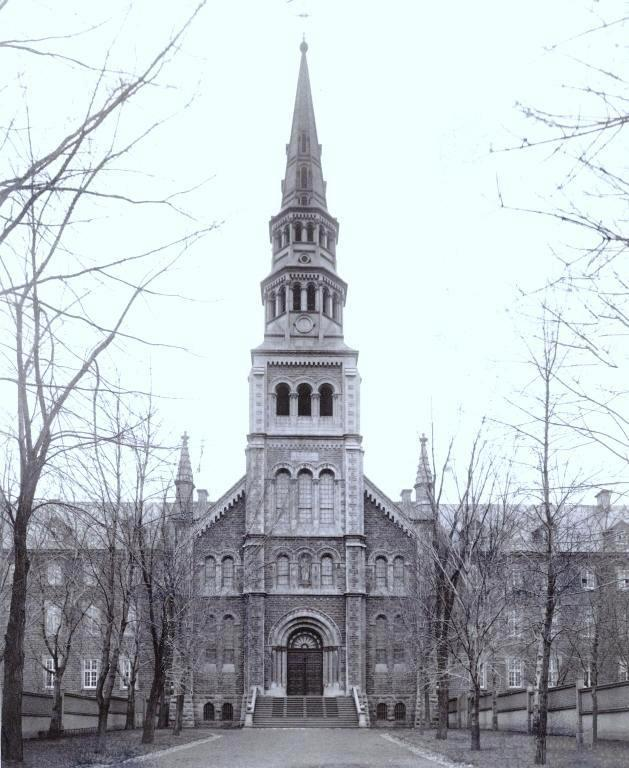
- The chapel of the Invention-de-la-Sainte-Croix
- Interactive map of Grey Nuns Motherhouse
- Location: 1190 Guy Street, Montreal, Quebec, Canada

History
- Built: 1869-1871
- Built for: Grey Nuns

Site notes
- Architect: Victor Bourgeau
- Architectural styles: Romanesque Revival and Neoclassical
- Owner: Concordia University

National Historic Site of Canada
- Official name: Mother House of the Grey Nuns of Montréal National Historic Site of Canada
- Designated: 2011

Patrimoine culturel du Québec
- Official name: Maison mère des Sœurs-Grises de Montréal
- Designated: 1976

The Grey Nuns Building is a heritage building part of Concordia University. It is the former Motherhouse of the Sisters of Charity of Montreal, also known as the Grey Nuns. Among other features, it includes the Chapel of the Invention of the Holy Cross. During the 19^{th} century, the congregation's General Hospital, which had served as the community's Motherhouse since the French regime, had become dilapidated and no longer met the needs of the Grey Nuns. In 1869, Mother Julie Hainault-Deschamps, the superior of the community, undertook construction work on a new Motherhouse. Built according to plans by architect Victor Bourgeau, under the supervision of the Sulpician Mathurin-Clair-Louis Bonnissant, it housed the Grey Nuns from 1871 until the 2000s. Located in Montreal's Ville-Marie borough, the complex is bounded by Guy, René-Lévesque, Saint-Mathieu and Sainte-Catherine streets and is now part of Quartier Concordia. It was acquired by Concordia University in 2007, which renovated it to house a student residence and a reading room.

== History ==
The Sisters of Charity of Montreal had taken over the General Hospital (not to be confused with the Montreal General Hospital, founded in 1819) from the Hospitaller Brothers of Saint Joseph and the Cross, also known as the Charron Brothers, in August 1747. Built in 1692, the hospital was almost entirely destroyed by a fire a few years after the Conquest of New France by the British, before being rebuilt and expanded several times whenever it was needed.

=== A neglected building ===
By the mid-19^{th} century, the old General Hospital no longer met the needs of the Grey Nuns. In 1854, the superior, Mother Julie Hainault-Deschamps, highlighted its cramped conditions, writing that the rooms were too small for the number of poor people the community housed and cared for at that time, and that they had almost no amenities.

She also denounced the unsanitary conditions on the lower floor, which were caused by repeated floodings in the cellars, where water accumulated every fall and remained throughout winter. This led to significant disruptions and property damage. In her view, the lack of space also prevented the community from better receiving and caring for the poor.

Furthermore, Montreal, which was at that time in the midst of an economic boom, also experienced rapid demographic and urban expansion. This, in turn, led to the opening of new streets designed to facilitate access to the city's port, which was also rapidly growing. Facing important pressure, as their property was located on the Pointe-à-Callière, close to the port, the Grey Nuns started to look for a new location for the General Hospital.

Mother Deschamps believed it was necessary to act quickly in order to secure a large plot of land at a fair price. Despite this, she acknowledged her community's attachment to the hospital, which they had by then occupied for more than a century. Her project also required the approval of the Sulpicians, who had originally granted the General Hospital's land to the Grey Nuns in 1747.

=== New acquisitions by the Grey Nuns ===
==== Côte Saint-Antoine ====
On July 16 1856, Olivier Berthelet donated to the congregation eight arpents of orchards located in the Faubourg Saint-Antoine, a district of Montreal which was at the time undergoing development but was still peaceful enough to house the hospital. The donation encouraged the Grey Nuns to move forward with their project. In 1857, they purchased a 45 arpents property in the area, which they expanded the following year by acquiring adjacent lots. Starting with a single donation, they quickly built up a considerable estate in the Saint-Antoine district, in what is now Westmount, bounded by Sherbrooke and Kitchener Streets as well as Greene Avenue.

The property was soon deemed too far from the city center by the superior of the Sulpicians, Mathurin-Clair-Louis Bonnissant, who took upon himself to find a more suitable place for the new motherhouse. Soon after, on October 18 1860, he wrote to the Bishop of Montreal, Ignace Bourget, to inquire about a property which belonged to the Seminary at Croix-Rouge, also known as the Mont Sainte-Croix.

==== Croix-Rouge or Mont Sainte-Croix ====
The Mont Sainte-Croix plot (1900)

Bishop Bourget favored the Mont Sainte-Croix location primarily for two reasons. First and foremost, the plan to relocate the General Hospital was part of his pastoral strategy. During the 1850s, the city's westward expansion had altered its demographic makeup, which meant that Montreal was no longer predominantly French-speaking, as shown by a 1861 census. Faced with the growth of Anglican and Protestant communities, Bishop Bourget sought to strengthen the Catholic Church's presence in the western part of the city. This led him to prioritize the establishment of French speaking Catholic institutions in these wealthier neighborhoods in order to ensure a better religious and linguistic balance within Montreal. The Sulpicians themselves had settled in the area a few years earlier, in 1857.

The bishop also saw this as a way to improve the financial situation of the Grey Nuns, whose charitable works were by then an important strain on their resources. He therefore proposed not only the subdivision of their original property on the Pointe-à-Callière so they could finance their charity work but also the sale of their lands on the Côte-Sainte-Antoine in order to fund the construction of the new hospital.

To this end, the Sulpicians offered the Grey Nuns the Croix-Rouge property. Discussions regarding the transaction began in earnest, with the Grey Nuns willing to pay the asking price but requesting an interest-free payment plan to give them time to raise the necessary funds. On 3 February 1861, Mother Hainault-Deschamps, her assistant sister Elizabeth Forbes McMullen and the congregation's novice mistress, sister Mary Jane Slocombe, having secured a two-year interest-free payment plan, purchased the vast Mont Sainte-Croix property from the Sulpicians. Four days later, they expanded their new property by buying nearby lots belonging to James Mullin.

In the following years, the Grey Nuns sold parts of their lands in Pointe-à-Callière as well as their Côte-Saint-Antoine property. They also took out loans and had stores built on the site of their old hospital.

=== Rumors ===
In choosing the Mont Sainte-Croix property in the Faubourg Saint-Antoine, the Grey Nuns established themselves in the heart of "New Montreal", which later became known as the Golden Square Mile, an area increasingly occupied by the English-speaking elite. However, the announcement of the new hospital's construction sparked concerns among many residents and business owners of the area. These fears were fueled by the poor reputation of such institutions, which were generally associated with the destitute, people with disabilities, or those with contagious diseases. Furthermore, the Grey Nuns' plan to erect a wall around the property added to the controversy. To allay these fears, the congregation ultimately decided against building the wall.

=== Beginning of the construction works ===
In 1868, the first plans were drawn up and workers began to haul stone to the site. On 31 March 1869, the Grey Nuns retained the services of architect Victor Bourgeau, who had already completed several projects for religious communities in Montreal. He was responsible for the project's development and for supervising the construction, along with his associate, the draftsman Étienne-Alcibiade Leprohon. The actual construction of the building was entrusted to contractor Joseph Perreault.

However, the construction plans and the layout of the building was decided in close collaboration with superior Bonnissant, who also acted as intermediary between the Grey Nuns, the architect and the contractors.

=== An H-shaped layout, with rusticated stonework and gas lighting ===
The Motherhouse's facade under construction (1889)

Construction officially began on 28 April 1869. In designing the new general hospital, which would also serve as their motherhouse, the Grey Nuns prioritized change within continuity. They thus decided to retain their former hospital's H-shaped layout, on the advice of the Sulpicians' superior. The much larger area of the new site also allowed for the better organization of the facility's various functions. In the central section, the east wing, facing Guy Street, was intended for the congregation, while the west wing, facing Saint-Mathieu Street, was to house their residents, primarily orphans and the elderly.

The Grey Nuns opted for a sober building devoid of superfluous ornamentation, in accordance with the views of the Sulpicians, who advocated simplicity in both interior and exterior architecture and design. This commitment is reflected in particular in the choice of pediments with clean lines and traditional windows, rather than the arched sash windows typical of the surrounding residences, built in the Victorian style.

The plans also made rooms for a few innovations. At Bonnissant's initiative, the Grey Nuns decided to use rusticated stone instead of dressed stone. Introduced in Montreal during the construction of the Church of the Gèsu (1864-1865), this type of stone, whose rough surface gives a rustic appearance to facades, was used on all elevations facing Guy, Dorchester (later René-Lévesque), and Saint-Mathieu streets. It helped set the new motherhouse apart and marked a notable evolution in Montreal's architectural landscape.

The new building introduced further innovations in its interior layout. Its main wing, 50 feet wide, featured a double-depth layout connected by a central corridor, which made possible to double the number of rooms, streamline traffic flow, and clearly separate private and public spaces. The building was also equipped with a gas lighting system, which was in itself an innovation at the time. Construction of the men's quarters, reserved for workers employed in the motherhouse's maintenance) also began in 1869.

The part which was set aside for the Grey Nuns was completed as planned, and the sisters left the old hospital for their new motherhouse on 7 October 1871. At that time, only the east wing and half of the main building had been completed. By then, it was one of the largest buildings of its kind in Quebec.

=== The chapel ===
The Motherhouse's chapel (n.d.)

In 1874, construction of the chapel began. The cornerstone was laid in early May of that year. Superior Bonnissant had a clear vision for the chapel, which he intended to make one of the most remarkable features of the complex. He therefore recommended replicating the layout of the former hospital's chapel. While the initial plans called for a building flanked by two towers, those adopted in 1869 featured a more understated design, with a single yet impressive bell tower. Built in the neo-romanesque style, the chapel had a Latin cross plan and measured 69 feet wide by 172 feet deep.

Its interior was the most innovative aspect of the project. While its floor plan and volume draw inspiration from romanesque architecture, its interior design also reflected the neo-gothic influences which characterized French religious architecture during the 19^{th} century. The space, with its monumental proportions, echoed the layout of large neo-romanesque churches as interpreted in several buildings around Paris at that time.

Innovation also lied in the use of clerestory, or high windows, which flooded the nave with light. This feature, which was relatively uncommon in Montreal at the time, also drew inspiration from the Church of the Gèsu. True to the Sulpicians' principles, the interior decor was simple and unadorned, prioritizing light and imposing dimensions above all else.

The Grey Nuns also planned a crypt to house their cemetery, reflecting their desire to ensure that the new facilities would be a spiritual continuation of their former hospital. They attended their first Mass in their new chapel, named the Chapel of the Invention of the Holy Cross, on 1 December 1878. The façade, however, remained unfinished for several years, and the bell tower was not completed until 1890. A vast green space surrounded the building, initially consisting of a garden with fruit trees to provide for the community's needs, and later featuring ornamental trees and shrubs.

=== Work spanning several years ===
Aerial view of the Motherhouse (1949)

After the completion of the main building, the chapel and the men's quarters in 1878, constructions continued in phases. Some projects originally planned, such as the washhouses, were abandoned. In 1880, a wrought-iron gate, anchored to stone pillars, was erected to close off the path leading to the chapel. The western section of the central wing, where the orphanage was located, was completed in 1901. After several years of construction, both wings of the central part of the motherhouse had four and a half stories and were topped with a gable roof.

=== Return to the old hospital ===
Children eating at the Youville Nursery (before 1925)

In 1918, a violent fire destroyed the Motherhouse's west wing and tragically claimed the lives of dozens of orphans who were sleeping in the dormitory. The wing was rebuilt the very next year. Several additions were also made to the complex during that period. The boys' dormitory, built of gray stones and comprising one and half stories, was expanded with the addition of a flat-roofed stone annex in 1925. A two-story brick annex housing the boiler room was built in 1932, and finally, in 1946, another two-story brick addition was built at the rear of the main building to house the kitchens.

The Motherhouse was at that time home to several institutions managed by the Grey Nuns: the Youville Nursery for orphans (1871-1925), St. Mathieu's residence for the elderly (1874-1972), the familial Institute (1905-1964), the Marguerite d'Youville Institute (1934-1963) and the Normal School (1937-1964). It also housed boarders from 1888 until 1972. Every day, up to a 1000 peoples frequented the Motherhouse.

The Motherhouse's refectory (1929)

During the 1960s and 1970s, the government of Quebec gradually took charge of healthcare and social services, which forced the province's religious congregations to reconsider their mission. The Grey Nuns, who had been providing both since the XVIII^{e} century, thus decided to welcome organizations which took care of the homeless or women who were victims of domestic abuse.

During the 1960s, the Grey Nuns started to consider returning to the general hospital in Old Montreal, which they finally did in 1981, when a local community of sisters began to live in the facilities, who were renamed Maison de Mère d'Youville (or Mother d'Youville's House). In 1984, the men's residence was sold to a private company. The majority of sisters remained at the Motherhouse, although in the early 2000s the congregation finally decided to sell the building.

=== The Grey Nuns Building and Concordia University ===
The Grand Opening of Concordia's Grey Nuns Building (2014)

In 2007, Concordia University, founded in 1974 through the merger of George Williams University and Loyola College, acquired the property under an agreement for a gradual transfer of ownership extending through 2022, which allowed the Grey Nuns to continue occupying the motherhouse for the time being. The agreement stipulated that development would take place in phases, with the first phase, concerning the western section, already completed in 2007 and the second phase, concerning the central section and the chapel, starting in 2011.

The Grey Nuns' crypt remains the property of the congregation. It houses the graves of 232 nuns as well as those of François d'Youville, Marguerite d'Youville's son, of two of her sisters and three of her nieces. Upon conversion for university use, public health authorities expressed concerns due to the presence of the remains of smallpox victims in the crypt. There were also fears that the site might be frequented during student initiations. The ensure the premises' safety, a concrete slab was poured over the graves.

In 2014, the Grey Nuns Building was officially inaugurated for university use. That same year, Concordia University acquired the men's residence. Today, Concordia's Department of Education occupies part of the renovated spaces, along with student housing.

== Heritage site ==
Under the Quebec Cultural Property Act, both the chapel of the Invention of the Holy Cross (1974), with its protection zone (1975), and the Grey Nuns' Motherhouse (1976) are designated heritage sites.

== Bibliography ==
Gauthier, Raymonde (1983). Victor Bourgeau et l'architecture religieuse et conventuelle dans le diocèse de Montréal (1821-1892) (Ph.D. dissertation) (in French). Université du Québec à Montréal.

Gauthier, Raymonde (1991). "Domaine des Sœurs grises de Montréal". Les chemins de la mémoire. Monuments et sites historiques du Québec. Tome II (in French). Québec: Publications du Québec: 113–116.

Litalien, Rolland, ed. (1986). L'Église de Montréal : aperçus d'hier et d'aujourd'hui, 1836-1986 (in French). Montréal: Fides.

Martin, Tania (1995). Housing the Grey Nuns : Power, Religion and Women in the Fin-de-siècle Montréal (Master's thesis). McGill University.

Martin, Tania (1999). "The Mother House of the Grey Nuns : A Building History of the General Hospital". Journal de la Société pour l'étude de l'architecture au Canada. 24 (2): 40–49.

Noppen, Luc (2009). "La Maison-mère des Sœurs grises de Montréal. Genèse d'un haut lieu du paysage construit montréalais". Journal de la Société pour l'étude de l'architecture au Canada (in French). 34 (2): 3–44.

Pinard, Guy (1989). Montréal, son histoire, son architecture (in French). Vol. 3. Montréal: Éditions de La Presse.
