= George Moffatt (Canada East politician) =

Businessman and politician in Lower Canada

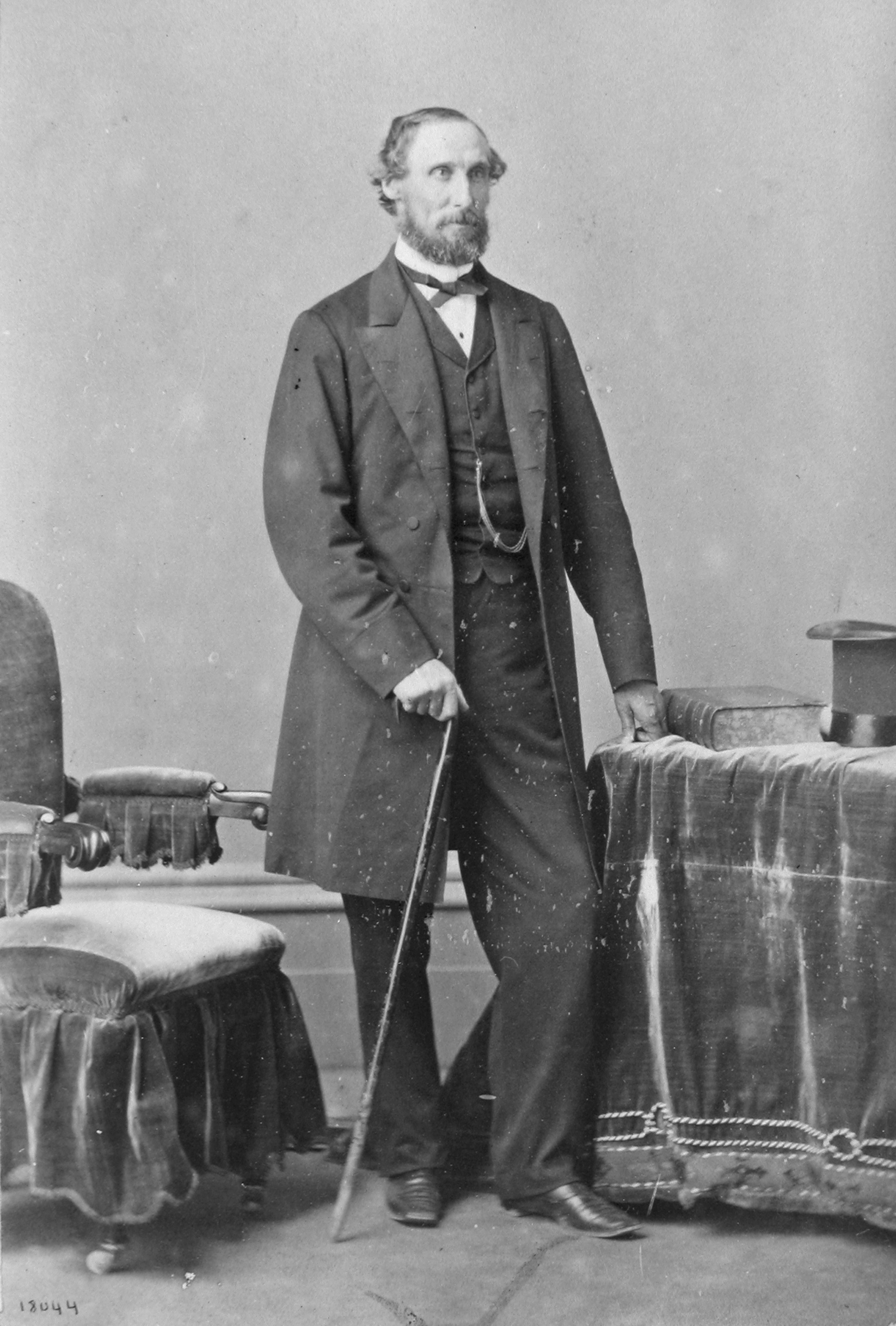

Member of the Legislative Council of Lower Canada
- In office 1830–1838
- Succeeded by: None; constitution suspended

Member of the Executive Council of Lower Canada
- In office November 1838 – February 10, 1841
- Succeeded by: None; office abolished

Member of the Special Council of Lower Canada
- In office November 2, 1838 – February 10, 1841
- Succeeded by: None; office abolished

Member of the Legislative Assembly of the Province of Canada for Montreal (two-member constituency)
- In office 1841 – October 30, 1843 Serving with Benjamin Holmes
- Preceded by: None; new office
- Succeeded by: Pierre Beaubien

Member of the Legislative Assembly of the Province of Canada for Montreal (two-member constituency)
- In office 1844–1848 Serving with Clément-Charles Sabrevois de Bleury
- Preceded by: Pierre Beaubien; Lewis Thomas Drummond
- Succeeded by: Benjamin Holmes; Louis-Hippolyte LaFontaine

Personal details
- Born: August 13, 1787 Sidehead, Weardale, County Durham, England
- Died: February 25, 1865 (aged 77) Montreal, Province of Canada
- Spouse(s): (1) Wife of Indigenous ancestry; name unknown (c. 1809) (2) Sophia MacRae (1816)
- Children: 4 sons
- Occupation: Businessman

Military service
- Allegiance: Britain
- Branch/service: Lower Canada militia
- Battles/wars: War of 1812

George Moffatt (August 13, 1787 – February 25, 1865) was a businessman and political figure in Lower Canada and Canada East (now Quebec). Born in England, he emigrated to Lower Canada at the age of 14. He became involved in business in Montreal, including the fur trade.

Moffatt was involved in the municipal politics of Montreal, and in 1830 was appointed to the Legislative Council of Lower Canada. Following the Lower Canada Rebellion of 1837–1838, he was appointed to the Executive Council of Lower Canada and the Special Council of Lower Canada, an appointed body that took the place of the Parliament of Lower Canada, which was suspended. He provided advice to the Governor General, Lord Durham, on the constitutional reforms following the Rebellion, and supported the union of Lower Canada and Upper Canada. He also urged moderation after the Rebellion, suggesting to the Colonial Secretary that banishment for the most serious rebels was the appropriate penalty.

After the union of Lower Canada with Upper Canada, Moffatt was elected to the Legislative Assembly of the Province of Canada, as one of two members for Montreal. He resigned his seat in 1843 to protest the proposal to move the seat of government from Kingston to Montreal, but was re-elected in the general election of 1844. He did not stand for election in the general election of 1848.

Although Moffatt began his political career as a leader of the British Tories in Lower Canada, and opposed any conciliatory measures towards the French-Canadians, his views gradually moderated. By his second term in the Legislative Assembly, he was the seconder of the motion calling on the British government to amend the Union Act, 1840 to allow French to be used in the provincial Parliament, on the same status as English.

After leaving electoral politics, Moffatt supported the controversial Rebellion Losses Bill, to compensate residents of Lower Canada for property damage in the Rebellion. He also was one of the organisers of the British American League, which opposed the Montreal annexationist movement of the late 1840s. He continued in his business activities for the rest of his life.

He died in Montreal in 1865.

== Early life ==
Moffatt was born in Sidehead, Weardale, County Durham, England in 1787. After a brief period of studies in London, he emigrated to Lower Canada in 1801 at the age of 14, under the sponsorship of a Montreal merchant, John Ogilvy. After further studies at William-Henry (now Sorel), he joined Ogilvy's firm, which was part of the XY Company, involved in the fur trade. Moffatt later joined McTavish, McGillivray and Company, part of a rival fur-trading company, the North West Company.

Moffatt made various trips to the northwest as part of the fur trade. At one point he married an Indigenous woman in a common law relationship, by whom he had one son around 1809. Relationships of this type were common in the fur trading community, and were termed marriage à la façon du pays or "marriage according to the custom of the country". Moffatt brought his son, Lewis, back to Montreal with him. Lewis Moffatt became a well-respected businessman in Upper Canada.

Moffatt served in the Montreal militia during the War of 1812, under the command of Lieutenant Colonel Charles de Salaberry.

In 1816, Moffatt married Sophia MacRae in Montreal. The couple had three sons.

== Business career ==
In 1811, Moffatt started a new firm, which eventually became Gillespie, Moffatt, and Company. Moffat ran the Montreal office, while his partner, Robert Gillespie, ran the firm's office in London. The partnership dealt in import-export trade, marine transport, and insurance. The firm became a major supply house associated with the North West Company, but Moffatt maintained business connections with the rival Hudson's Bay Company. In 1815 and 1816, he assisted Colin Robertson, a trader for the HBC, during his expeditions to the Athabaska country. Moffatt helped bring stability to the fur trade in Canada by smoothing the way for the merger of the North West Company and the HBC in 1821.

In the meantime, his company had expanded into a wider range of imports and exports. By 1821, Gillespie, Moffatt and Company was the largest import-export business in Montreal, with extensive premises in the harbour, as well as owning their own ship. Moffatt's eldest son, Lewis, eventually moved to Toronto, Upper Canada, and opened a successful branch office of the firm. The company was also Canadian agents for the Phoenix Fire Assurance Company. By 1845, they had developed a large portfolio of insured properties in Montreal. An inspector for the British parent company reported favourably in 1846 on Moffatt's judgment in assessing risks in Montreal.

Outside the partnership, Moffatt also had significant business activities on his own behalf, investing in real estate, settlement in the Eastern Townships, railway construction, mining, and banking. He was an investor and promoter in the Champlain and St. Lawrence Railroad, the first public railway in Canada, as well as the St. Lawrence and Atlantic Railroad, connecting Montreal to the ice-free harbour of Portland, Maine. He was an early director of the Bank of Montreal. In 1822 he was a founding member of the Montreal Committee of Trade. By 1844, he was president of its successor, the Montreal Board of Trade.

One of Moffatt's major interests, both as a businessman and later in the Legislative Assembly, was the improvement of the Montreal harbour. In 1831 he was chosen the chair of the Montreal Harbour Commission, and was heavily involved in projects to improve the harbour.

== Political career ==
=== Lower Canada ===
In the early 1830s, Moffat was active in Montreal municipal politics. In 1830, he was appointed to the Legislative Council of Lower Canada, the upper house of the Parliament of Lower Canada. He was one of the leaders of the British "constitutionalist" party in the Montreal area, and contributed to the decisions of the Legislative Council to reject bills passed by the elected Legislative Assembly of Lower Canada, which had a large French-Canadian majority. He also contributed to the political tensions by bringing criminal charges against the editors of two newspapers who had published articles criticising the Legislative Council, Ludger Duvernay and Daniel Tracey. Their imprisonment and release after numerous protests contributed to the high tensions in the 1832 election, in which Tracey was a candidate. In his capacity as a magistrate, Moffatt requested the aid of British troops to maintain order at the polls. Three of Tracey's supporters were killed. Moffatt was likely one of the behind-the-scenes originators of a series of venomous anti-French letters which were published in the Montreal Herald in the summer of 1835, opposing the British government's attempts at conciliation with French-Canadians in Lower Canada.

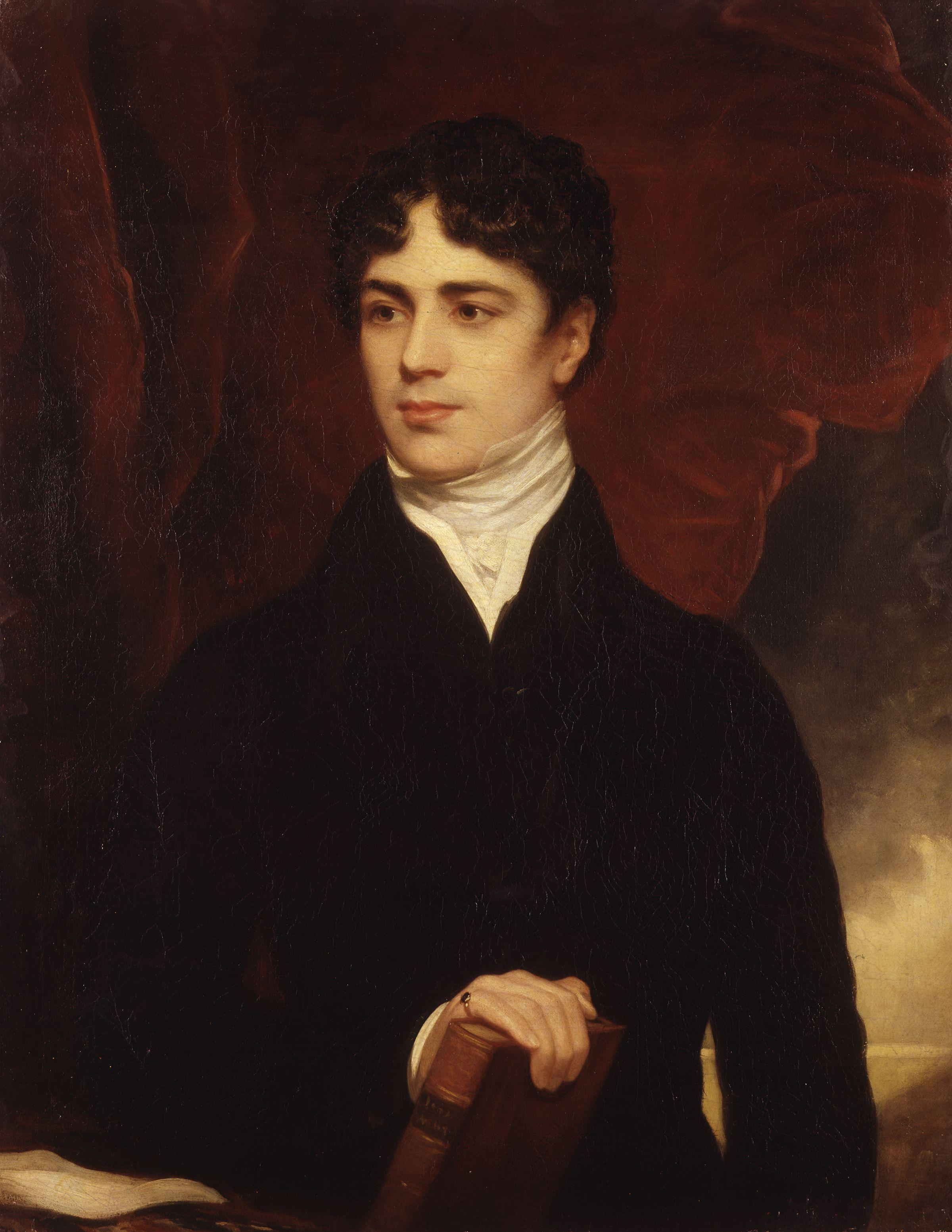
Lord Durham, who took advice from Moffatt on the political situation

In the fall of 1837, in the run-up to the Lower Canada Rebellion, Moffatt travelled to London with William Badgley, a lawyer from Montreal, to explain the political situation in Lower Canada to members of the British government, and outline the position of the "British Party" in Lower Canada. The Rebellion broke out while they were in London. During that time, they met with the Colonial Secretary, Lord Glenelg. Moffatt recommended moderation in dealing with the rebels, suggesting banishment of only a few of the most serious cases. He also supported a union of Lower Canada with Upper Canada. Moffatt and Badgley also met with the newly appointed Governor General of British North America, Lord Durham, and prepared a detailed memorandum for him, giving their views on issues that needed to be addressed in Lower Canada. They also provided a letter advising against an elected Legislative Council, which was one of the grievances raised by the Legislative Assembly. Moffatt travelled back to Lower Canada with Durham, and in their discussions, proposed a legislative union of the two Canadas to Durham.

Moffatt served in the Legislative Council until 1838, when the constitution of Lower Canada was suspended by a British Act of Parliament, as a result of the Rebellion. He was named to the Special Council of Lower Canada that governed the province after the Rebellion.

=== Province of Canada ===
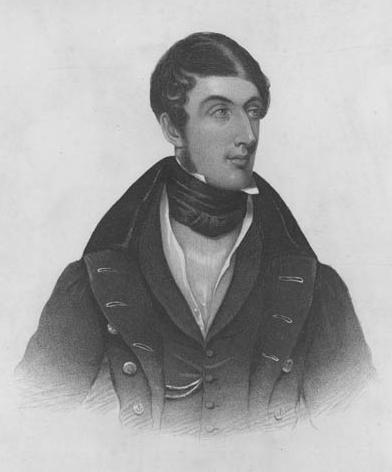
Lord Sydenham, who thought Moffatt was "pig headed"

In his report on British North America, Lord Durham recommended that Lower Canada and Upper Canada be merged into two provinces, with local control provided by the principles of responsible government. The Union Act, 1840, passed by the British Parliament, abolished the two provinces and their separate parliaments, and created the Province of Canada, with a single parliament for the entire province, composed of an elected Legislative Assembly and an appointed Legislative Council. However, the British government did not immediately accept Durham's recommendation for responsible government. The Governor General retained a strong position in the government.

Durham's tenure as governor general was short, and he was replaced in 1839 by a British member of Parliament, Charles Thomson (later Lord Sydenham). Thomson did not get along with Moffatt and refused to appoint him to the Legislative Council of the new province. In a letter to the new Colonial Secretary, Lord Russell, Thomson described Moffatt as "the most pig headed, obstinate, ill tempered brute in the Canadas . . . whom I shall certainly not put in the new Legislative Council". However, Thomson supported Moffatt as a candidate to the new Legislative Assembly.

In the first general elections in 1841, Moffatt was elected by acclamation to the Legislative Assembly of the Province of Canada as one of two members for the city of Montreal, alongside Benjamin Holmes, another Montreal businessman. During his time in Parliament, Moffatt supported the union of the Canadas and was a consistent supporter of the government of the governors-general, as a member of the "British Tory" group from Canada East. He opposed the restructuring of the ministry in 1842 with a stronger Reform balance. However, Moffatt resigned in 1843 to protest the proposal to move the seat of government from Kingston to Montreal, on the basis that it was unfair to the residents of Canada West to have the government so far away; Kingston was in Canada West, but close to the border with Canada East. In the subsequent by-election in November 1843, Moffatt was replaced by Pierre Beaubien.

The next general election was in 1844, and Moffatt again contested the Montreal seat. He was successful, defeating Beaubien and returning to Parliament, with Clément-Charles Sabrevois de Bleury as his fellow Montreal member. This time, he stayed in office for the entire term of the Parliament. He again generally supported the Governor General's government, as a member of the "British Tory" group from Canada East. On the language issue, however, his views had moderated. He disavowed his earlier comments that only English should be used in Parliament, and seconded a motion by Denis-Benjamin Papineau, calling on the British Parliament to amend the Union Act, 1840 to allow French to be used as an official language in Parliament.

During his time in Parliament, Moffatt remained focussed on measures that would help the Montreal English-speaking business community and economy, such as improvements to the harbour. He sponsored bills in the Assembly which were favoured by the Montreal Board of Trade, as well as bills relating to charitable institutions such as McGill University and the Montreal Grey Nuns' Hospital.

Moffatt chose not to be a candidate in the general elections of 1848.

== Later life and death ==
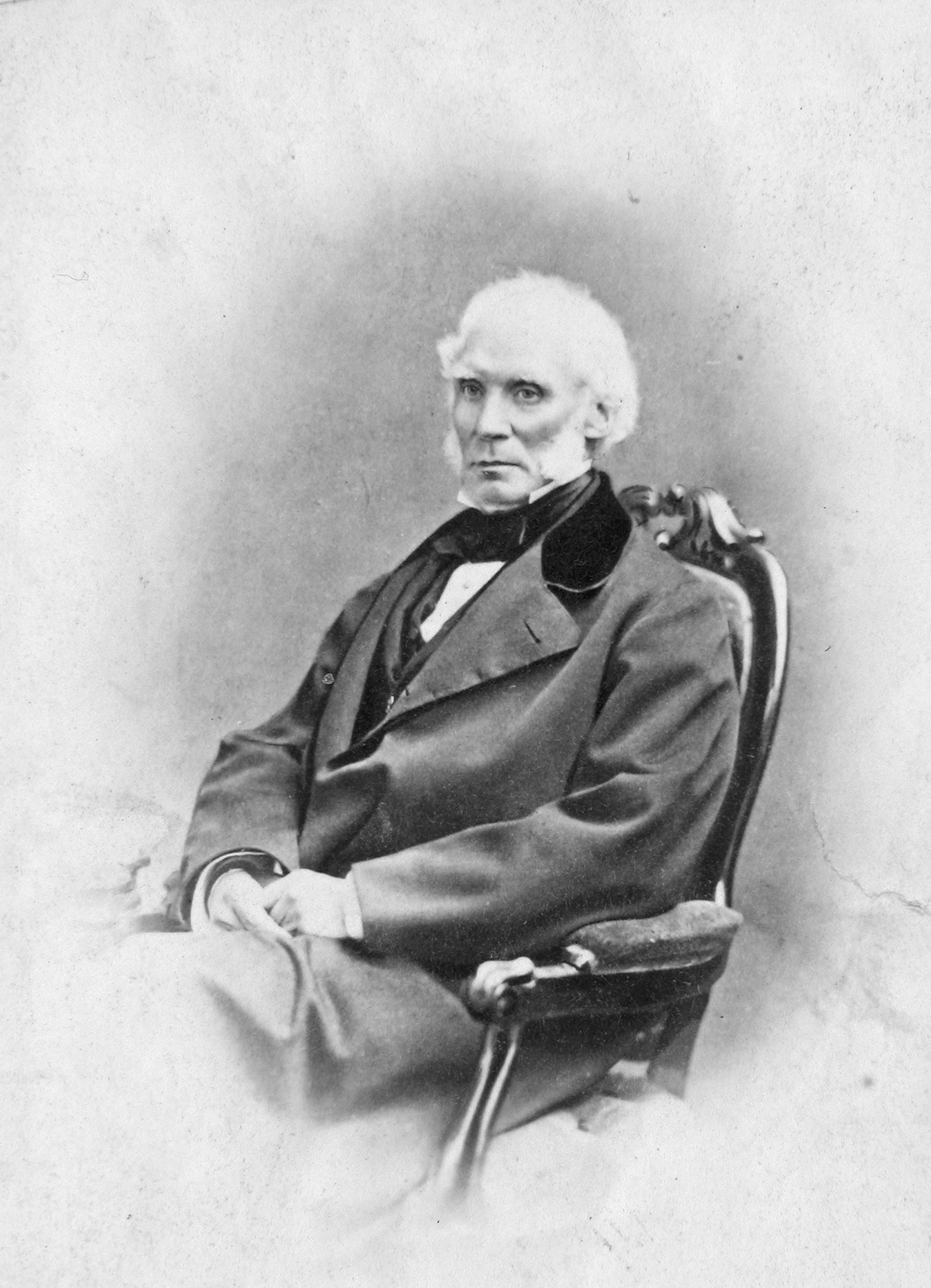
Moffatt in later life

Although Moffatt left electoral politics, he continued to be involved in some political disputes. When the issue of compensation for residents of Lower Canada who had suffered property losses during the Rebellion came up in the provincial Parliament in 1849, he indicated that he supported the measure, even though the compensation was highly controversial with British Tories. In fact, the passage of the Rebellion Losses Bill led to Tory riots in Montreal and the burning of the Parliament building.

Moffatt was also involved in a political movement amongst the Tories of Canada East and Canada West in 1849, in response to the annexation movement. The British Parliament had repealed the Corn Laws, including the Canada Corn Act 1843, thereby ending an imperial preference for Canadian grain products. The repeal had a serious effect on the Canadian economy and led to calls for annexation to the United States by a group of English-speaking Montreal businessmen, traditional Tory supporters. The movement culminated in the publication of the Montreal Annexation Manifesto in the Montreal Gazette on October 11, 1849. One of the prominent signers of the Manifesto was John Abbott, a leading lawyer in Montreal and a future prime minister of Canada.

In response, Moffatt helped to organise the British American League, to argue for the retention of the British connection. As president of the Montreal branch of the League, drawn largely from the English-speaking business community, Moffatt relied on his contacts with the business community in Canada West to develop opposition to annexation. The League met in Kingston in July 1849, and passed motions rejecting annexation. They also passed resolutions calling for a union of the British North American provinces, greater economy in public expenditures, and protectionist measures for Canadian industry. The issue of annexation gradually dwindled. Moffatt considered that the League had helped to demonstrate that the Conservative and Tory political groupings were not supportive of annexation.

After leaving politics, Moffatt continued his business activities in Montreal, particularly in banking and railways, part of a period of rapid economic changes and development.

Moffatt died in Montreal in 1865.

== See also ==
1st Parliament of the Province of Canada
