= Benjamin Holmes (Canadian politician) =

Lower Canada banker and politician

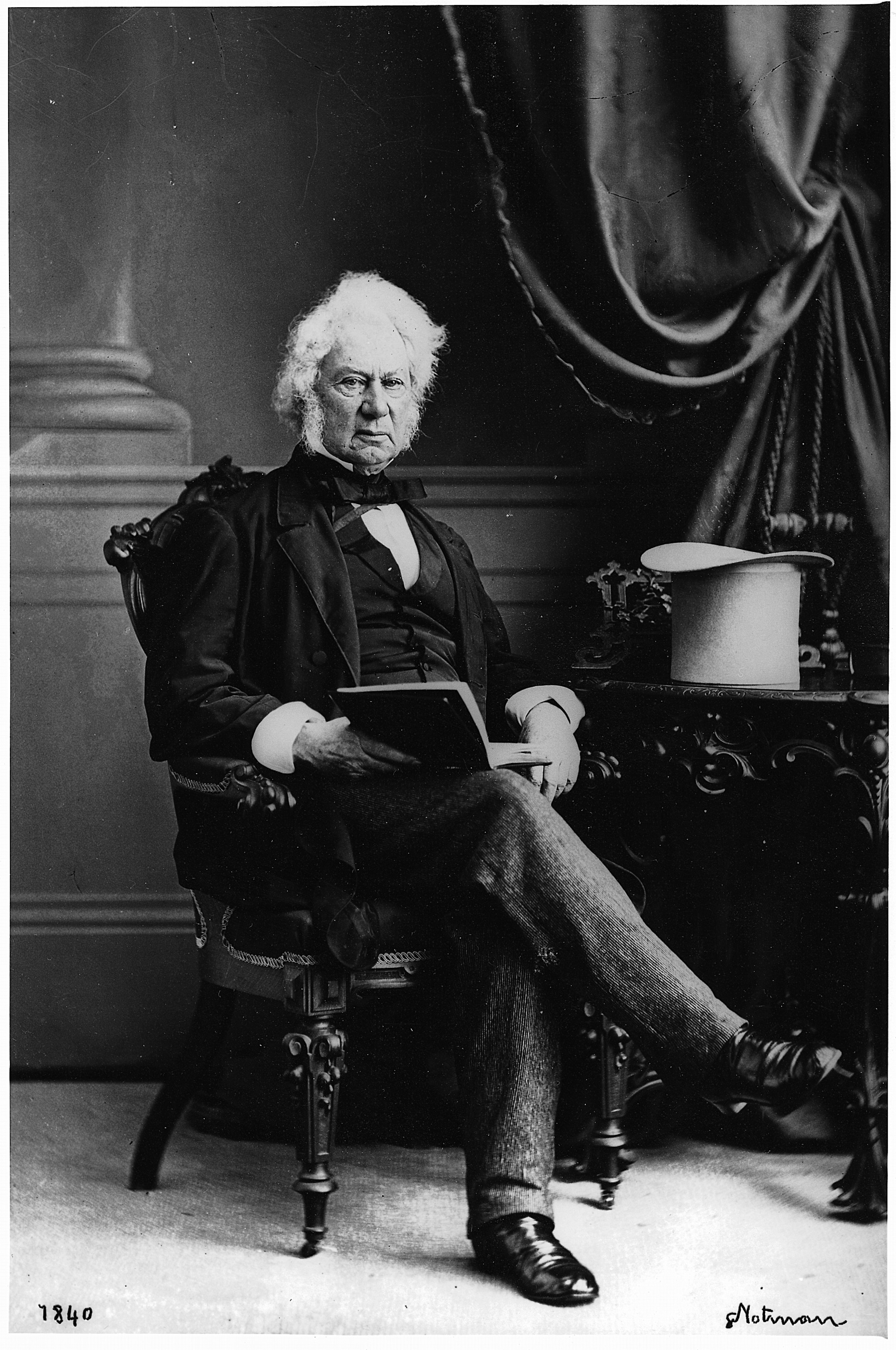
- Benjamin Holmes in 1863

Member of the Legislative Assembly of the Province of Canada for Montreal (two-member constituency)
- In office 1841–1844 Serving with: George Moffat (1841–1843); Pierre Beaubien (1843–1844)
- Preceded by: New position
- Succeeded by: Lewis Thomas Drummond

Member of the Legislative Assembly of the Province of Canada for Montreal (two-member constituency)
- In office 1848–1851 Serving with Louis-Hippolyte LaFontaine
- Preceded by: Pierre Beaubien; Lewis Thomas Drummond
- Succeeded by: William Badgley; John Young

Personal details
- Born: April 23, 1794 Dublin, Ireland
- Died: May 23, 1865 (aged 71) Montreal, Province of Canada
- Spouse: Élisabeth Arnoldi (m. 1819)
- Relations: Andrew Fernando Holmes (brother); Daniel Arnoldi (father-in-law); Charles Dewey Day (son-in-law)
- Occupation: Businessman

Military service
- Allegiance: Britain
- Branch/service: Lower Canada militia
- Years of service: 1813 to 1815
- Rank: Lieutenant (War of 1812); Lieutenant-Colonel (Lower Canada Rebellion)
- Unit: Canadian Light Dragoons (1813–1814); Canadian Light Fencibles (1814–1815); Montreal Light Infantry (1837–1838)
- Battles/wars: War of 1812; Lower Canada Rebellion

Benjamin Holmes (April 23, 1794 – May 23, 1865) was a Lower Canada businessman and political figure. He served in the militia of Lower Canada during the War of 1812, including a period of captivity by the American forces. He joined the Bank of Montreal shortly after it formed in 1817, and rose to be the cashier (general manager) by 1827. He was twice a member of the Legislative Assembly of the Province of Canada. In spite of his service in the War of 1812, he was a supporter of annexation by the United States in the late 1840s, and a signatory of the Montreal Annexation Manifesto. He became a vice-president of the Grand Trunk Railway, and also a director of the Bank of Montreal.

== Early life and family ==
Born in 1794 in Dublin, Ireland, Holmes was the son of Thomas Holmes and Susanna Scott. His father had some military background. In 1797, the Holmes family took ship to North America, but their vessel was captured by a French frigate and taken as a prize to Cadiz, Spain. The family was kept in Spain for four years. Holmes' younger brother, Andrew Fernando Holmes, was born during their captivity. Finally, in 1801, they were able to complete their voyage to Lower Canada.

In 1819, Holmes married Élisabeth Arnoldi, daughter of Dr Daniel Arnoldi in Montreal. Benjamin's brother Andrew apprenticed under Dr Arnoldi and was one of the founders of the Montreal Medical Institute, the forerunner to the McGill School of Medicine.

== Militia service ==
Holmes began work as a clerk with a group of Montreal merchants under Horatio Gates, but joined the Canadian Light Dragoons during the War of 1812, becoming lieutenant in 1813. He took part in the Niagara campaign of 1813 in Upper Canada (now Ontario), but was taken prisoner in October. He was held as a prisoner of war in Kentucky, before being released in 1814. He was engaged in some commercial activities in Upper Canada, and then in 1815 received a new commission as an ensign in the Canadian Fencibles.

During the Lower Canada Rebellion of 1837–1838, Holmes served as lieutenant-colonel in the Montreal Light Infantry. In that role, he took an active part in suppressing the Rebellion, which won him support amongst the Montreal English-speaking community.

== Business career ==
In 1817, he began work as a discount clerk with the newly established Bank of Montreal. Within ten years, he became cashier (general manager) of the Bank. For the next twenty years, from 1927 to 1947, he guided the development of the Bank, taking responsibility for his management decisions and acting in a non-partisan fashion, which was important for an English-speaking banking organization in the increasingly heated ethnic politics of Lower Canada. However, after his first term as a member of the Legislative Assembly of the Province of Canada, he found his political neutrality called into question by the English-speaking business community. He resigned from the Bank of Montreal in 1847.

Holmes then began a merchandise and railway promotion business with John Young, a fellow merchant and politician in Montreal. However, in 1849, following the repeal of the imperial preference law and its effect on Canadian exports, Holmes signed the Montreal Annexation Manifesto, calling for the annexation of the Province of Canada by the United States. That led to the breakup of his partnership with Young.

He then became involved in the construction of a railway to connect Montreal to the ice-free port of Portland, Maine, and became a vice-president of the St. Lawrence and Atlantic Railroad. In 1853, when the Grand Trunk Railway acquired the St. Lawrence and Atlantic, Holmes continued as a vice-president of the Grand Trunk. That same year, he was elected a director of the Bank of Montreal. He retained that position until his death.

== Political career ==
=== Province of Canada ===
==== First term: 1841 to 1844 ====
Following the rebellion in Lower Canada, and the similar rebellion in 1837 in Upper Canada, the British government decided to merge the two provinces into a single province, as recommended by Lord Durham in the Durham Report. The Union Act, 1840, passed by the British Parliament, abolished the two provinces and their separate parliaments, and created the Province of Canada, with a single parliament for the entire province, composed of an elected Legislative Assembly and an appointed Legislative Council. The Governor General retained a strong position in the government.

He . . . had taken his seat in Parliament with prejudice for his guide — the veil had since fallen from his eyes, and he was ready to act cordially with gentlemen of French origin.

— Benjamin Holmes

In the first general election of 1841, Holmes was elected unopposed to the Legislative Assembly of the Province of Canada as one of two members for the city of Montreal, alongside George Moffatt, another Montreal businessman. A firm supporter of the union of the Canadas, Holmes initially was a member of the British Tory group from Canada East (as Lower Canada was now known), and a supporter of the Governor General, Lord Sydenham. However, over the course of the three annual sessions of the Parliament, Holmes gradually shifted towards the coalition of Reformers and the French-Canadian Group, and away from supporting the governor general. The major showdown between Governor General Sir Charles Metcalfe and the Reform ministry of Louis-Hippolyte LaFontaine and Robert Baldwin came in 1843, over the implementation of responsible government. The Lafontaine-Baldwin ministry resigned. Holmes was one of the co-sponsors of a resolution in the Legislative Assembly, supporting the outgoing Reform ministry and calling on the Governor General to respect the principle of responsible government. From his initial Tory position, he had shifted to a moderate independent position, and ended the last session as a member of the reform-minded French-Canadian Group. He explained that his views on cooperation with the French-Canadian members had changed over the course of the Parliament. This transition in his political views had resulted in a loss of support from some in the Montreal English-speaking community, who viewed him as a "ratter".

By 1844, the Bank of Montreal was suffering due to the absence of Holmes. He was persuaded by the Lafontaine group to resign his seat to trigger a by-election, which was won by the Lafontaine candidate, Lewis Thomas Drummond. Holmes returned to work at the bank, but he found that his political stances hampered his reputation for impartiality in the business community. He resigned from the bank in 1846.

==== Second term: 1848 to 1851 ====
Holmes was not a candidate in the general election of 1844, but he did stand for election in the general election of 1848. He was elected in the Montreal riding, along with Lafontaine. He was disappointed at not being named to the Cabinet, but supported the Lafontaine-Baldwin ministry in the Assembly, including the debates over the Rebellion Losses Bill. The passage of the bill resulted in an English-speaking mob rioting and burning the Parliament building in Montreal. Holmes broke with the Reform ministry in 1850, when he became a supporter of annexation and more extensive legal and political reforms. He was moving from Reform to the nascent Parti rouge. He did not stand for election in the general election of 1851.

=== Montreal municipal politics ===
By 1833, Holmes was involved in Montreal municipal politics. He was elected to the city council representing the west ward of the city from 1842 to 1846, and again from 1850 to 1851. In 1843, Holmes was involved in unsuccessful mediation efforts to avert strikes by workers on the Lachine and Beauharnois Canals, the bloodiest in the history of the Canadian labour movement. He was defeated in two attempts to become mayor of Montreal, in 1850 and again in 1860.

== Last days ==
Except for his attempt to become mayor of Montreal in 1860, Holmes had largely withdrawn from politics by the mid-1850s. In a late recognition of his contribution to the Reform cause, the Liberal government of John Sandfield Macdonald and Antoine-Aimé Dorion appointed Holmes as the receiver of customs at Montreal in 1863.

In 1853, his daughter Maria Margaret Holmes married Charles Dewey Day, who had served for a short time in the first Legislative Assembly of the Province of Canada, before being appointed a judge of the Lower Canada Court of Queen's Bench.

Holmes died at Montreal in 1865.

== See also ==
1st Parliament of the Province of Canada
