= Lewis Thomas Drummond =

Canadian lawyer, politician and judge

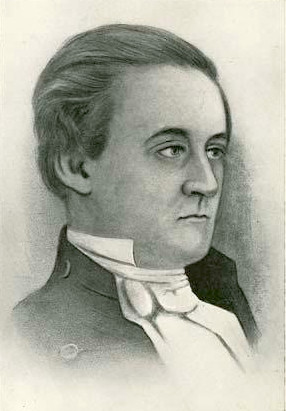

Solicitor General for Lower Canada
- In office 1848–1851
- Preceded by: Thomas Cushing Aylwin
- Succeeded by: Pierre-Joseph-Olivier Chauveau

Attorney General for Lower Canada
- In office 1851–1856
- Preceded by: Louis-Hippolyte LaFontaine
- Succeeded by: George-Étienne Cartier
- In office August 2, 1858 – August 6, 1858
- Preceded by: George-Étienne Cartier
- Succeeded by: George-Étienne Cartier

Member of the Legislative Assembly of the Province of Canada for Montreal (two-member constituency)
- In office April 17, 1844 – September 23, 1844 (by-election) Serving with Pierre Beaubien
- Preceded by: Benjamin Holmes
- Succeeded by: George Moffatt; Clément-Charles S. de Bleury

Member of the Legislative Assembly of the Province of Canada for Portneuf
- In office 1844–1847 (1 general election and 1 by-election)
- Preceded by: Thomas Cushing Aylwin
- Succeeded by: Antoine Juchereau Duchesnay

Member of the Legislative Assembly of the Province of Canada for Shefford
- In office 1848–1858 (4 general elections)
- Preceded by: Sewell Foster
- Succeeded by: Asa Belknap Foster

Member of the Legislative Assembly of the Province of Canada for Lotbinière
- In office 1858–1861 (by-election)
- Preceded by: John O'Farrell
- Succeeded by: Henri-Gustave Joly de Lotbinière

Member of the Legislative Assembly of the Province of Canada for Rouville
- In office 1861–1863
- Preceded by: Thomas Edmund Campbell
- Succeeded by: Joseph-Napoléon Poulin

Personal details
- Born: May 28, 1813 Coleraine, Ireland, United Kingdom
- Died: November 24, 1882 (aged 69) Montreal, Quebec
- Party: French-Canadian Group; "English" Liberal; Ministerialist; Bleu / Conservative; Rouge / Liberal
- Spouse: Josephte-Elmire Debartzch
- Relations: Pierre-Dominique Debartzch (father-in-law); Alexandre-Édouard Kierzkowski (brother-in-law)
- Children: 2 sons
- Education: Séminaire de Nicolet
- Profession: Lawyer

Lewis Thomas Drummond (May 28, 1813 – November 24, 1882) was a lawyer, political figure, and judge in Lower Canada (now Quebec).

== Family and early life ==
Drummond was born in Coleraine, County Londonderry, Ireland in 1813, the son of Lewis Drummond and Susan Harkin. His father was a prominent attorney in Ireland, but he died while Lewis Thomas was young. His mother emigrated to Lower Canada in 1825, bringing Lewis Thomas with her.

He studied at the Séminaire de Nicolet, then articled with a leading Tory lawyer in Montreal, Charles Dewey Day. Drummond was called to the bar of Lower Canada in 1836. He set up practice in Montreal and defended a number of persons involved in the Lower Canada Rebellions of 1837 and 1838.

In 1842, he married Josette-Elmire Debartzch. Their two sons became Jesuits. By his marriage, Drummond gained entrée to the French-Canadian conservative élite: Josette-Elmire was the daughter of Pierre-Dominique Debartzch and Josette de Saint-Ours, the owners of the seigneury of Saint-François (also known as Saint-Charles) and the seigneury of Cournoyer. Pierre-Dominique Debartzch had been elected to the Legislative Assembly of Lower Canada at the same time as Louis-Joseph Papineau, and like him supported the Parti canadien. Another of Debartzch's daughters married Alexandre-Édouard Kierzkowski, who was later elected to the Legislative Assembly of the Province of Canada

== Political career ==
=== The quest for responsible government: 1841–1847 ===
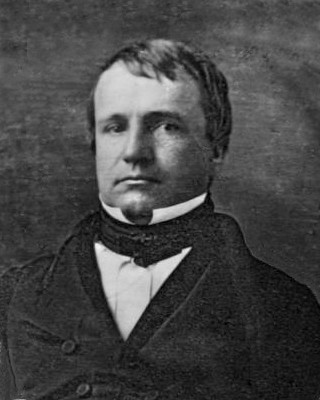
Louis-Hippolyte LaFontaine, who campaigned for responsible government

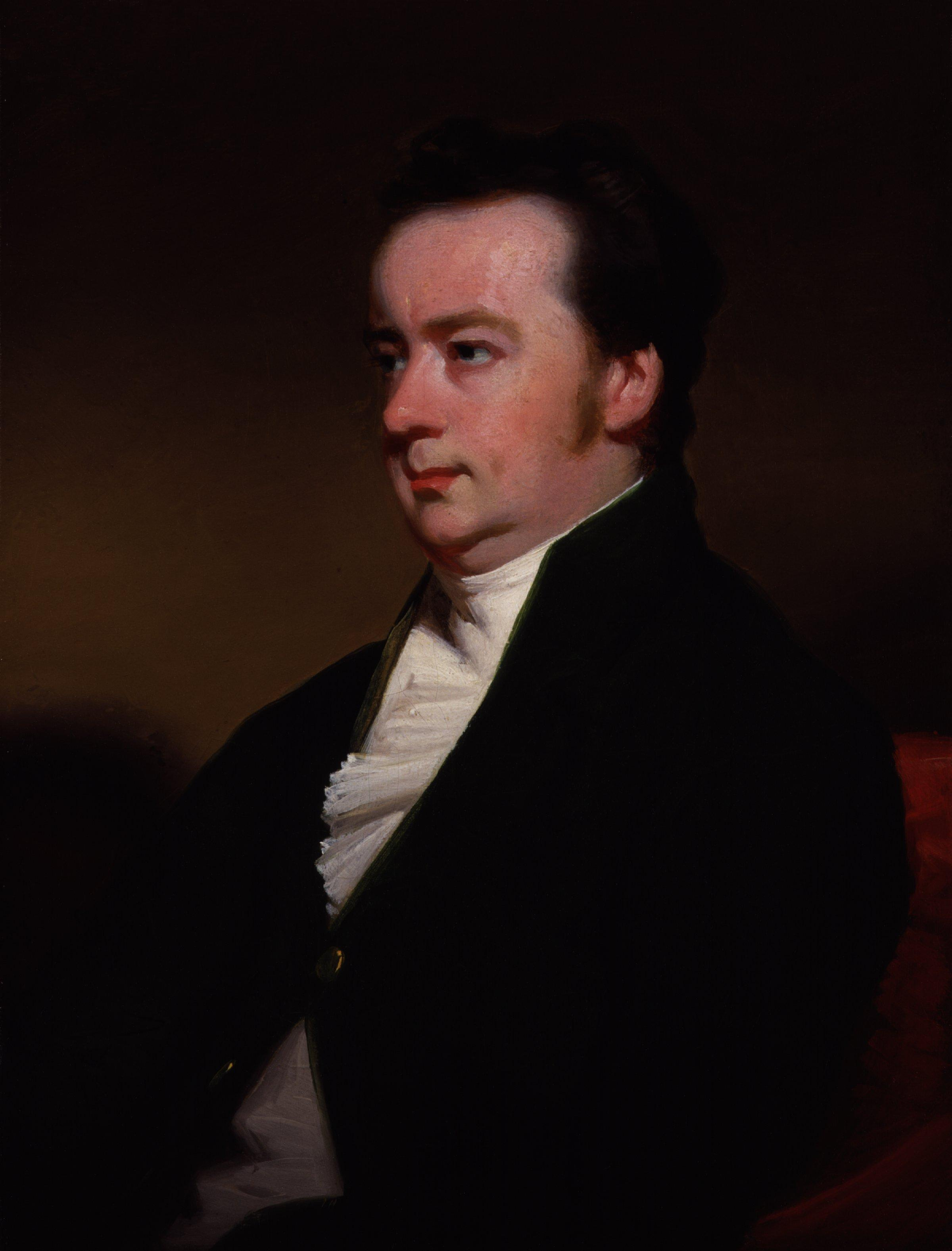
Governor General Sir Charles Metcalfe, who opposed attempts by LaFontaine and Baldwin to establish responsible government

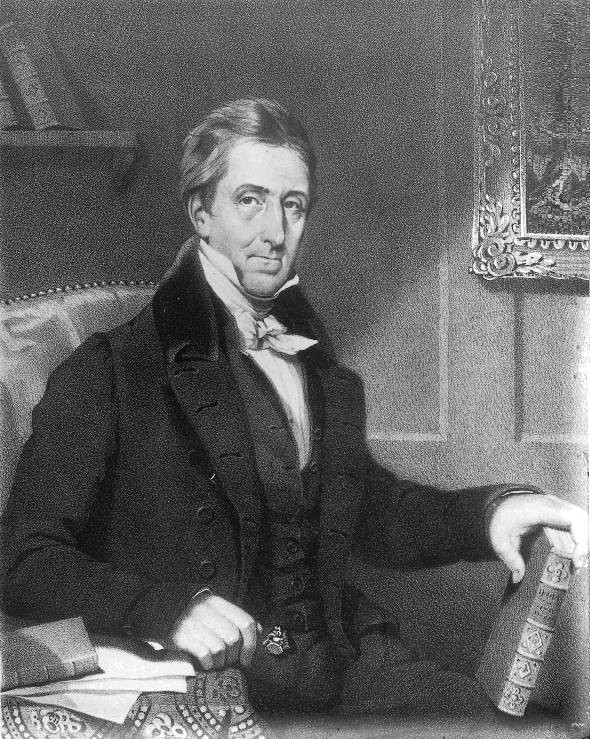
Denis–Benjamin Viger, LaFontaine's rival for the leadership of the French-Canadian Group

After the suppression of the Lower Canada Rebellions, Drummond supported the moderate reform position of Louis-Hippolyte LaFontaine, who was campaigning for the implementation of responsible government, as recommended by Lord Durham in the Durham Report. Under that principle, the Executive Council would be drawn from the group which had majority support in the elected Legislative Assembly, rather than leaving the government in the hands of the Governor General, appointed by the British government. Drummond became one of LaFontaine's party managers in Montreal, working to build up popular support for LaFontaine's leadership of the French-Canadian Group.

In 1843 and 1844 a split developed in the French-Canadian Group, between the older members such as Denis-Benjamin Viger and John Neilson, who had their roots in pre-Rebellion politics, and the newer reform members, led by LaFontaine and his campaign for responsible government. When one of the members from Montreal resigned his seat in 1844, Drummond stood for election against Viger's favoured candidate. Fluently bilingual, Drummond was able to appeal to French-Canadian voters. He was also able to gain the votes of Irish-Catholic workers, and won the hard-fought by-election. His victory was seen as a significant shift in support away from the older wing of the reformers, and a popular affirmation of LaFontaine's policy.

Drummond did not get a chance to sit in the Assembly in his Montreal seat. The Governor General, Sir Charles Metcalfe, advised by Viger and William Henry Draper from Upper Canada, decided that he would not recall the existing Parliament, which had supported LaFontaine and Robert Baldwin, the leader of the Upper Canada reformers. Instead, Metcalfe dissolved Parliament and called new general elections. Although LaFontaine's reform group did well in the elections, winning a majority of seats in Canada East, Baldwin and the Upper Canada reformers did not do so well in Canada West. Even combined, the LaFontaine and Baldwin reformers were in the minority in the new Assembly and formed the main opposition group. The Governor General kept Viger and Draper in office.

Drummond had again campaigned vigorously for LaFontaine in the elections, including speaking at a major campaign dinner in Montreal. He stood for re-election in Montreal, but was defeated by George Moffat, a Tory businessman. This time, the Irish-Catholic voters supported the more conservative candidates in Montreal. However, Drummond was able to get elected in the vacant seat of Portneuf, which he won by acclamation. In Parliament, Drummond caucused in a small group of "English" Liberals from Canada East rather than the French-Canadian Group, but continued to support LaFontaine on major issues. He also continued to speak for the Irish-Catholic workers in some of their disputes with employers.

=== LaFontaine–Baldwin ministry: 1848–1851 ===
In the general elections in 1848, the reform coalition of LaFontaine and Baldwin won a majority in both Canada East and Canada West. As well, the British government had instructed the new governor general, the Earl of Elgin, that he was to govern under the principles of responsible government, appointing the government from whichever groups had a majority in the Legislative Assembly. Elgin accordingly appointed LaFontaine and Baldwin as leaders of the ministry, and their choice of members of the Executive Council.

Drummond had been re-elected to the Assembly in the general elections, this time for the Shefford constituency, defeating the incumbent member, Sewell Foster. When LaFontaine and Baldwin formed the government, Drummond was appointed solicitor general for Canada East, making him a member of the government, although not in the Executive Council. He was re-elected in the resulting ministerial by-election, and held the position of solicitor-general for the term of the LaFontaine–Baldwin ministry, from 1848 to 1851. Drummond was also appointed Queen's Counsel in 1848.

In 1849, there was a growing annexationist movement centred in Montreal, calling for the peaceful annexation of the Province of Canada by the United States. It culminated in the Montreal Annexation Manifesto, signed mainly by leading members of the Montreal business community. Drummond was a strong opponent of the annexation movement, and used the patronage powers of the government to remove supporters of annexation from public offices in Montreal and the Eastern Townships. At one point, he suggested that the British government should send more troops to Canada to reinforce the provincial government.

=== From Bleu to Rouge: 1851–1861 ===
In 1851, LaFontaine and Baldwin both retired from politics. In the new ministry, headed by Francis Hincks and Augustin-Norbert Morin, Drummond was appointed Attorney General for Lower Canada and was a member of the Executive Council. In addition to his position as Attorney General, he was one of the government's representative on the board of the Grand Trunk Railway, which had received considerable subsidies from the government. He was re-elected in Shefford in the general elections of 1851, 1854, and 1857.

The members of the new ministry from Canada East were mainly the Ministerialists, later known as the Parti bleu, which developed from the more conservative wing of the French-Canadian Group. Drummond was part of a small group of English Conservatives which supported the government, and was hostile to the growing Clear Grit movement in Upper Canada, which he considered to be clearly marked with socialism.

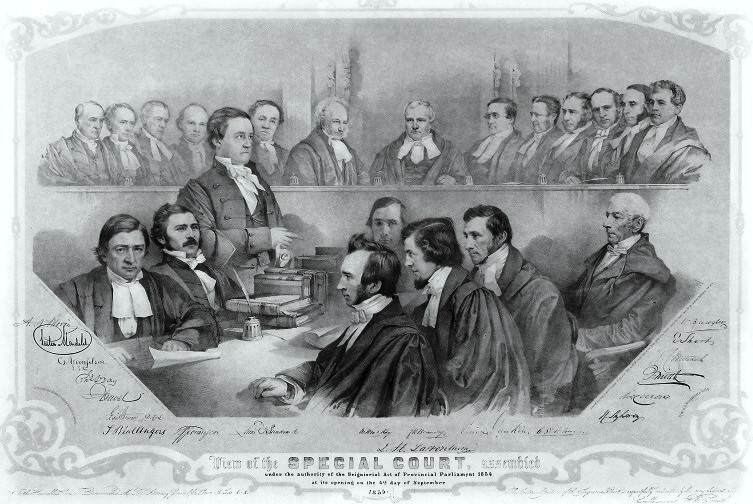
Drummond addressing the seigneurial commission

Although he had become a seigneur by marriage, Drummond as Attorney General developed legislation limiting seigneurial privileges which was later amended to abolish seigneurial tenure. The seigneurs ceased to be feudal superiors and became landlords. The habitant farmers could in theory buy their farms outright, at a price fixed by the seigneurial commission, or could become tenant farmers.

Drummond continued to hold the position of Attorney General until 1856, when John A. Macdonald and Étienne-Paschal Taché formed a new ministry. Drummond attempted to replace Taché as the co-premier from Canada East and threatened to resign. Macdonald and Taché instead accepted his resignation and appointed George-Étienne Cartier as Attorney General for Lower Canada. Two years later, when George Brown and Antoine-Aimé Dorion formed a Reform–Rouge ministry, Drummond left the Bleu–Conservative grouping and switched to the Parti rouge. Brown and Dorion appointed him Attorney General for Lower Canada. However, their ministry only lasted a few days. They were defeated on a confidence vote in the Assembly, and Macdonald and Cartier returned to office in the Double Shuffle.

Under the law at that time, Drummond automatically lost his seat in the Assembly on being appointed to the Executive Council, and had to stand for re-election in a ministerial by-election, even though he was only the Attorney General for a few days. He was defeated in the by-election by Asa Belknap Foster, the son of Sewell Foster, whom Drummond had defeated when he first won the Shefford riding in 1848. Drummond managed to get elected instead in a by-election in the riding of Lotbinière. In 1861, he was elected in Rouville; however, when he was named to the executive council as Commissioner of Public Works, he was unable to gain reelection and was forced to resign from the Executive Council.

== Commercial activities ==
Drummond was a director of the Montreal City and District Savings Bank, a new bank established with the patronage of Bishop Ignace Bourget to provide banking services to French-Canadians. He was also president of the Stanstead, Shefford and Chambly Railroad and helped found the Garden River Mining Company.

== Judgeship and later life ==
In 1864, he was appointed a judge of the Court of Queen's Bench. He retired due to poor health in 1873. He died in Montreal in 1882 from chronic bronchitis.

== See also ==
- 1st Parliament of the Province of Canada
- 2nd Parliament of the Province of Canada
- 3rd Parliament of the Province of Canada
- 4th Parliament of the Province of Canada
- 5th Parliament of the Province of Canada
- 6th Parliament of the Province of Canada
