= Pierre Beaubien =

Province of Canada physician and politician

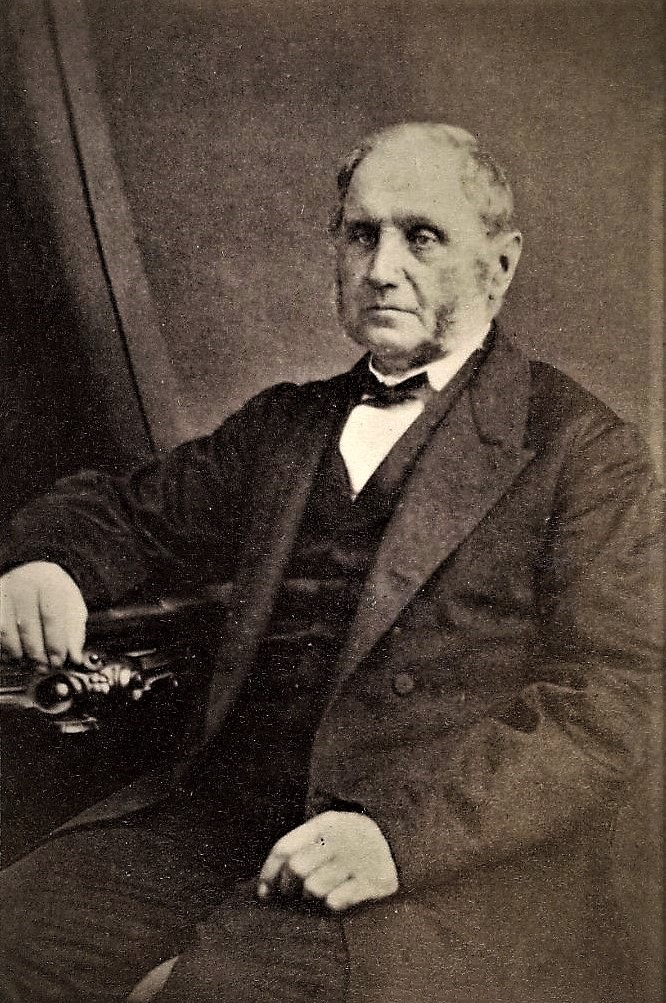

Member of the Legislative Assembly of the Province of Canada for Montreal (two-member constituency)
- In office 1843 – 1844 (by-election) Serving with Benjamin Holmes (1843–1844); Lewis Thomas Drummond (1844)
- Preceded by: George Moffatt
- Succeeded by: George Moffatt; Clément-Charles Sabrevois de Bleury

Member of the Legislative Assembly of the Province of Canada for Chambly
- In office 1848–1849
- Preceded by: Louis Lacoste
- Succeeded by: Louis Lacoste

Personal details
- Born: August 13, 1796 Baie-du-Febvre, Lower Canada
- Died: January 9, 1881 (aged 84) Outremont, Quebec
- Party: French-Canadian Group
- Spouse: Marie-Justine Casgrain
- Relations: Charles-Eusèbe Casgrain (brother-in-law); Louis Beaubien (son)
- Children: 11 children; 6 died in infancy
- Education: Séminaire de Nicolet; Petit Séminaire de Montréal; Académie de Paris
- Profession: Physician

Pierre Beaubien (August 13, 1796 – January 9, 1881) was a medical doctor and political figure in Canada East, Province of Canada (now Quebec). Trained in medicine in France, he practised and taught medicine in Montreal. He was involved in real estate development in Montreal, contributing to the creation of Outremont. He served two partial terms in the Legislative Assembly, the lower house of the Parliament of the Province of Canada, as a member of the French-Canadian Group under the leadership of Louis-Hippolyte LaFontaine.

== Family and early life ==
Beaubien was born in Baie-du-Febvre, Lower Canada (now Quebec) in 1796. His parents were a farm couple, Jean-Louis Beaubien and Marie-Jeanne Manseau. He studied at the Séminaire de Nicolet and the Petit Séminaire de Montréal. One of his teachers in Montreal, Abbé Jacques-Guillaume Roque, encouraged him to study in France, which he was able to do thanks to funding from his father and also from some of his relatives. In France, he completed a classical education at the Académie de Paris in 1819, and then studied medicine, qualifying as a doctor in 1822. He practised medicine in France for five years, and travelled in Europe.

== Medical practice ==
Beaubien returned to Lower Canada in 1827 and received his licence to practise medicine there the following year. His former teacher, Abbé Roque, was able to get him appointed as doctor to the Sulpicians and the Sisters of the Congregation of Notre Dame. Abbé Roque also obtained appointments for him at the Montreal General Hospital and Hôtel-Dieu de Montréal.

He practised at Hôtel-Dieu for fifty-one years, from 1829 to 1880. Beaubien was the first doctor to give clinical medical lectures at Hôtel-Dieu, and is believed to have been one of the first doctors to introduce the stethoscope to Canada. From 1832 to 1836 he was Montreal public health officer. He joined the Montreal School of Medicine and Surgery in 1849, becoming president of the school in the 1860s. Also in 1849, he was appointed medical superintendent of the Montreal jail, a position he held for the rest of his life.

== Commercial activities ==
In addition to his medical practice, Beaubien branched out into commercial activities. He became a major land-holder, and was involved in banking.

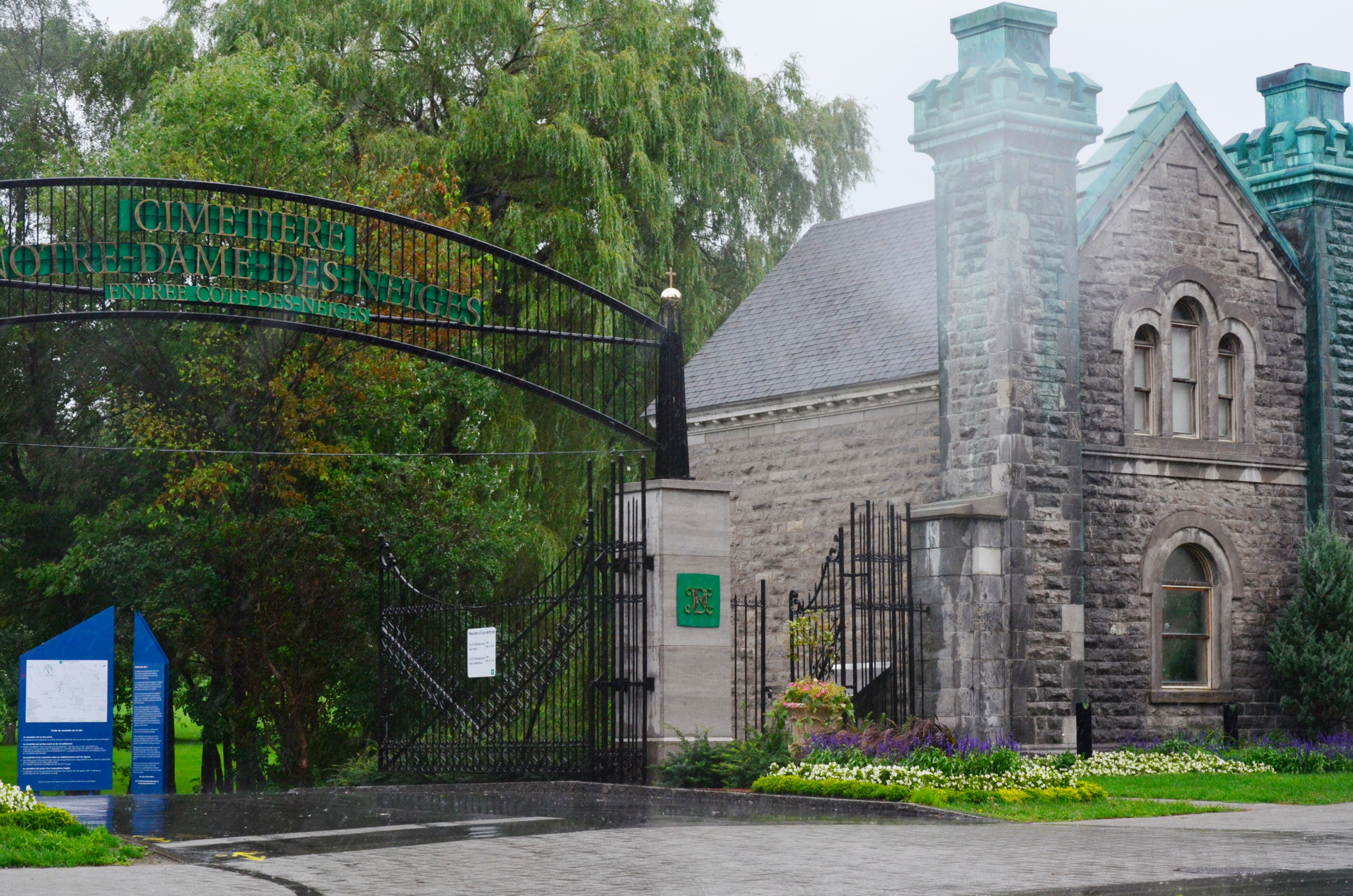
Notre Dame des Neiges Cemetery, on land purchased from Beaubien

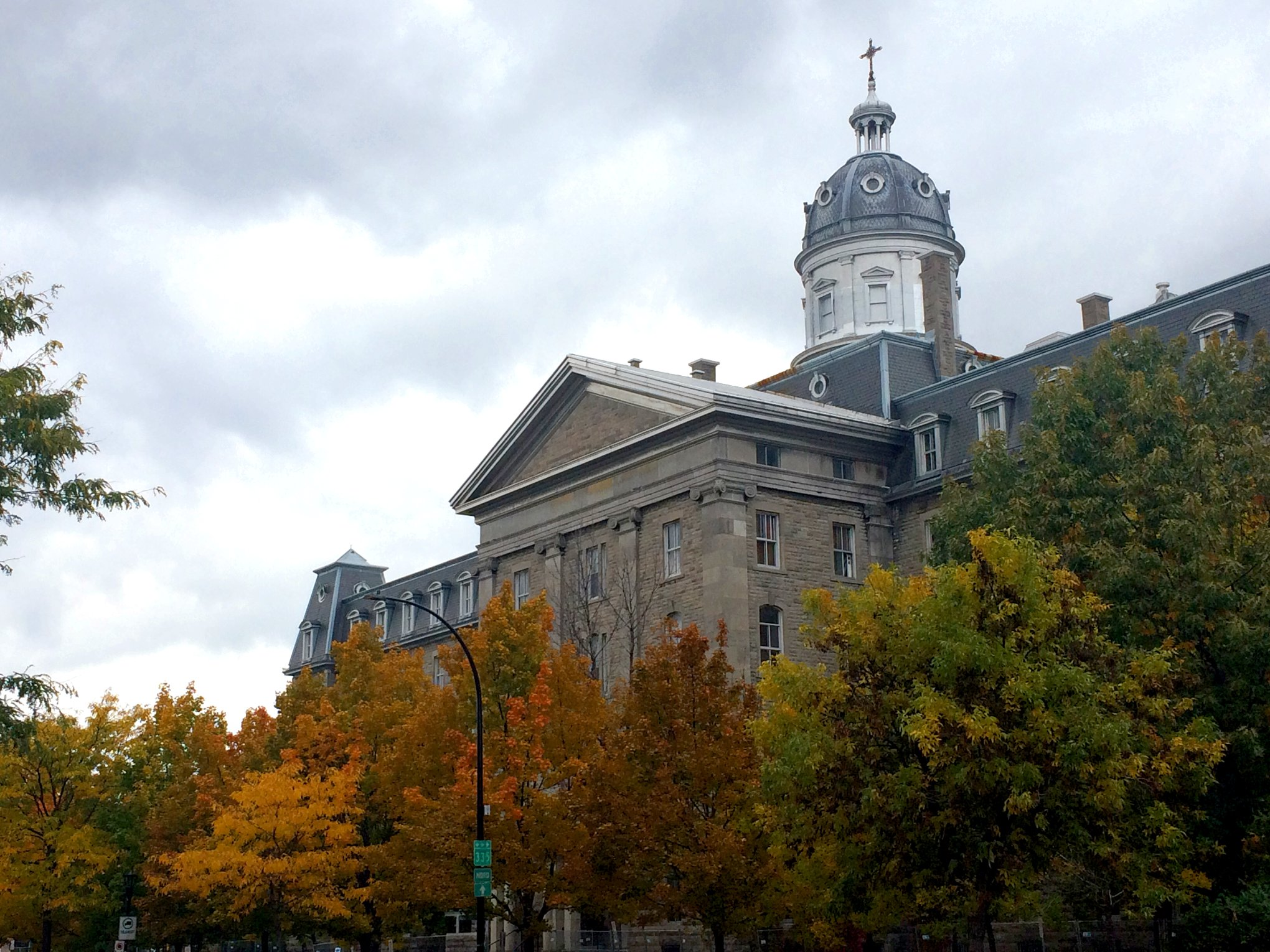
Montreal Institute for the Deaf and Mute, built on land donated by Beaubien

Beaubien eventually owned considerable properties in the areas of Côte-Sainte-Catherine, Côte-Saint-Louis, and Côte-des-Neiges. The suburb of Outremont was developed on his properties, and Notre Dame des Neiges Cemetery is on land he previously owned. He donated four of the lots he owned in Côte-Saint-Louis to Bishop Ignace Bourget, who used the property to establish the Montreal Institute for the Deaf and Mute in 1879. Shortly before Beaubien died, he gave the remaining twenty-two lots to his son Louis. Along with Louis-Hippolyte LaFontaine and Joseph Bourret, Beaubien was co-owner of the sub-fief of La Gauchetière, which they had acquired from the Sulpician order in 1844.

Beaubien was also involved in the creation and operation of two different banks, although his precise role is not clear. The first was the Banque du Peuple, created in 1835 by a partnership headed by Jacob De Witt and Louis-Michel Viger. It was designed to provide credit to small businesses and farmers, particularly French-Canadians, to break the monopoly of the Bank of Montreal. The second bank was the Montreal City and District Savings Bank, designed to provide banking services for individuals. Bishop Bourget was involved in the creation of this bank, as he wanted to encourage savings by lower-economic people who did not normally have access to banks. As of 2024, the bank is still in business, as the Laurentian Bank of Canada.

== Political activities ==
Beaubien served two terms on the city council for Montreal. From 1842 to 1844, he was councillor for the Saint Lawrence ward, and the councillor for the Saint Louis ward from 1846 to 1847.

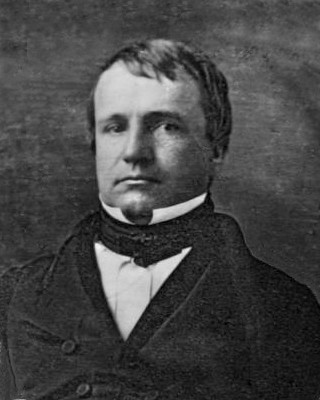
Louis-Hippolyte LaFontaine, leader of the French-Canadian Group

Beaubien also served two partial terms in the Legislative Assembly, the lower house of the Parliament of the Province of Canada. He was first elected in November, 1843, to one of the two Montreal seats, after one of the incumbents, George Moffatt, resigned in protest at the decision to move the Parliament from Kingston to Montreal. Beaubien was elected late in the parliamentary session, and joined the French-Canadian Group led by LaFontaine. He was in time to participate in a major vote in the Assembly, condemning the Governor General, Sir Charles Metcalfe, for not following the principles of responsible government. The motion passed on December 2, 1843, by a vote of 46 to 23 with the support of the French-Canadian Group, including Beaubien. Metcalfe prorogued the Parliament on December 9, 1843, and did not recall it until after the general elections of 1844.

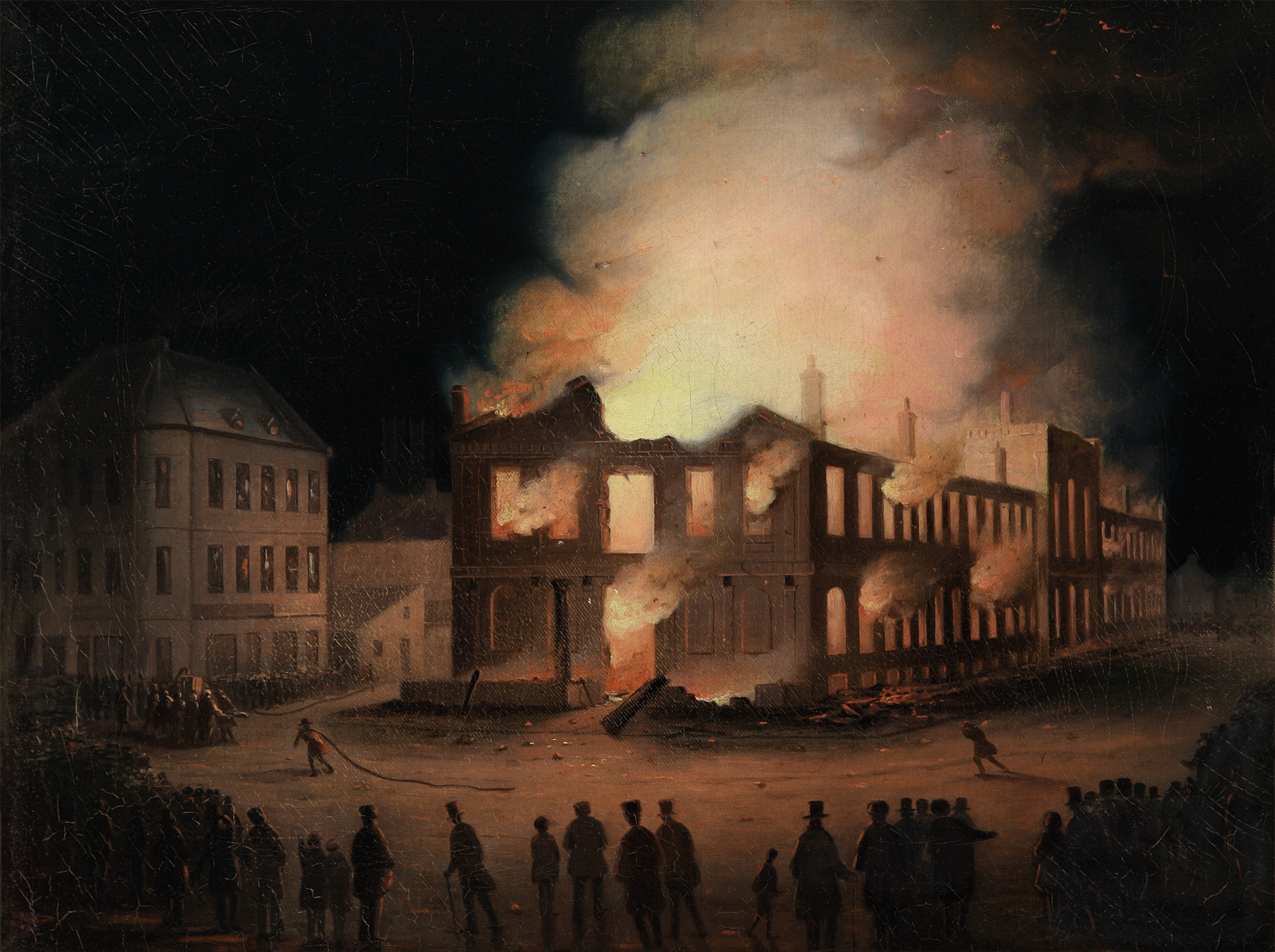
Burning of the Parliament Building, Montreal, after passage of the Rebellion Losses Bill

Beaubien stood for re-election in the 1844 elections, and spoke at a major reform meeting in Montreal. However, he and the other Montreal member, Lewis Thomas Drummond, were defeated by Moffat and Clément-Charles Sabrevois de Bleury. In 1848, Beaubien again stood for election, this time in the Chambly riding, and was elected. He again was a member of the French-Canadian group, and again participated in a major vote, in favour of the Rebellion Losses Bill, introduced by the LaFontaine-Baldwin ministry. Its purpose was to compensate individuals in Lower Canada who had suffered property losses in the Rebellion, but attracted intense opposition from the English-aligned Tories. When the bill passed and Governor General Lord Elgin gave royal assent, Tories in Montreal rioted and burnt the Parliament buildings. After the 1849 session ended, Beaubien resigned his seat to take the position of medical superintendent at the Montreal prison, ending his political career.

Beaubien was a long-time member of the Association Saint-Jean-Baptiste de Montréal. He was elected its president in 1859.

== Marriage and later life ==
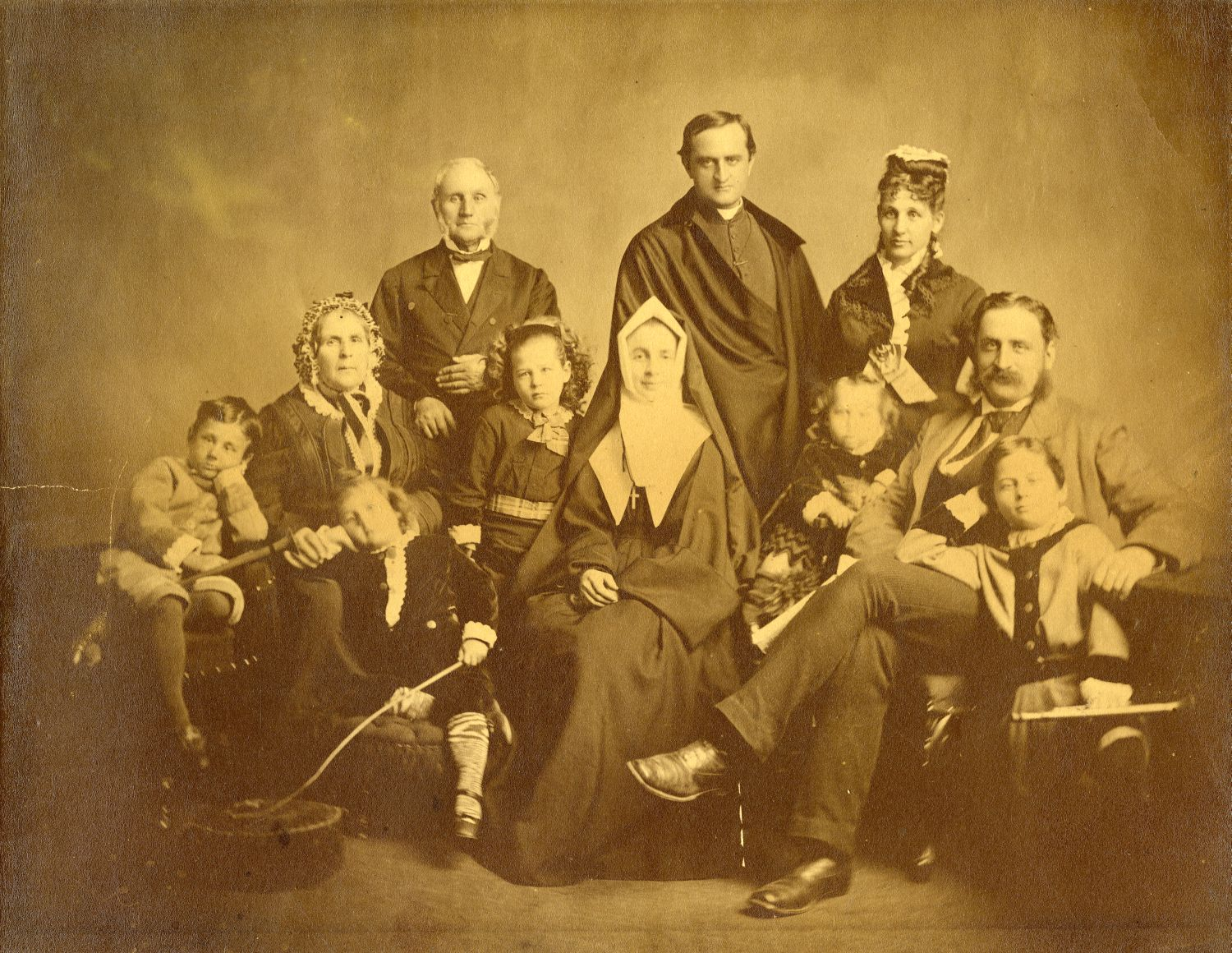
The Beaubien family, 1874

In 1829, Beaubien married Marie-Justine Casgrain, the daughter of Pierre Casgrain. She was a widow, having previously been married to a naval surgeon. The marriage took place in the chapel of the General Hospital of Quebec. Her brother, Charles-Eusèbe Casgrain, was a lawyer who had been a member of the Legislative Assembly of Lower Canada prior to the Lower Canada Rebellion.

The couple had eleven children, but six of them died in infancy. One son, Louis Beaubien, also went into politics, sitting at various times in the Legislative Assembly of Quebec and the House of Commons of Canada. Two of their sons went into the priesthood, and their only surviving daughter became a nun.

Beaubien continued practising and teaching medicine until shortly before his death. He died in Outremont in 1881.

Beaubien Street and Beaubien Metro Station are named after him.

== See also ==
- List of presidents of the Saint-Jean-Baptiste Society of Montreal
