= Montreal (Province of Canada electoral district) =

Electoral district in former Province of Canada

Province of Canada electoral district

Defunct pre-Confederation electoral district
- Legislature: Legislative Assembly of the Province of Canada
- District created: 1841
- District abolished: 1861
- First contested: 1841
- Last contested: 1858

Montreal was an electoral district of the Legislative Assembly of the Parliament of the Province of Canada, in Canada East. It was created in 1841 and included much of the city of Montreal. Its boundaries were specifically drawn by the British Governor General, Lord Sydenham, to include voters of British background, disenfranchising francophone Canadien voters, an example of an ethnic and linguistic gerrymander. Sydenham's purpose was to gain support in the Legislative Assembly for the new Province of Canada, which had merged the formerly separate provinces of Lower Canada and Upper Canada.

Twelve years later, in a redistribution of the electoral districts, the provincial Parliament re-drew the boundaries of the Montreal constituency, adopting the municipal boundaries of Montreal as the basis for the electoral district.

Montreal electoral district was a multi-member constituency. From 1841 to 1854, it was represented by two members in the Legislative Assembly. In 1854, an additional member was added, for a total of three members. The three-member constituency was abolished in 1861, when it was split into three single-member ridings.

== Boundaries ==
The Union Act, 1840, passed by the British Parliament, merged the two provinces of Lower Canada and Upper Canada into the Province of Canada, with a single Parliament. The separate parliaments of Lower Canada and Upper Canada were abolished.

The Union Act provided that the pre-existing electoral boundaries of Lower Canada and Upper Canada would continue to be used in the new Parliament, unless altered by the Union Act itself. Montreal was one of the electoral districts specifically defined by the Union Act. Prior to the Union Act, the Island of Montreal was divided into three electoral districts, called Montreal East, Montreal West, and Montreal County. The Act changed this situation by providing that the city of Montreal would be one district, but gave the Governor General the power to set the boundaries for the district. Any parts of the city which were not included in the boundaries set by the Governor General would be included in the adjoining electoral district, namely a revised Montreal County.

The first Governor General, Lord Sydenham, exercised the power to draw boundaries by a proclamation issued shortly after the formation of the Province of Canada in early 1841. His overall goal in drawing the boundaries was to ensure that supporters of the creation of the new Province of Canada would be elected. The boundaries did not follow the normal municipal boundaries, rather being drawn along certain streets and geographic features. This new electoral district was designed to exclude as many francophone Canadien voters as possible, and to include as many voters of British background as possible, since they generally supported the union. It was an example of an ethnic and linguistic gerrymander. The areas of Montreal which were not included in the new electoral district instead were included in Montreal County. The result was the effective disenfranchisement of Montreal francophone voters in the 1841 election.

In 1853, after the establishment of responsible government and local control, the provincial Parliament passed a statute to expand the number of seats in the Assembly and re-draw the boundaries. As part of that redistribution, the new boundaries for the Montreal electoral district were based on the municipal boundaries of the city, instead of the highly specific boundaries used by Sydenham.

== Members of the Legislative Assembly (1841–1861) ==
The Montreal electoral district was a multi-member seat. Under the Union Act, 1840, it was originally entitled to two members in the Legislative Assembly. In the 1853 redistribution, it was given an additional member, allowing it to return three members to the Legislative Assembly.

The following were the members of the Legislative Assembly from Montreal. The party affiliations are based on the biographies of individual members given by the National Assembly of Quebec, as well as votes in the Legislative Assembly. "Party" was a fluid concept, especially during the early years of the Province of Canada.

Parliament	Members	Years in Office	Party
1st Parliament; 1841–1844	Benjamin Holmes (Note: Resigned seat on February 1, 1844: "Biography of Benjamin Holmes". Dictionnaire des parlementaires du Québec de 1792 à nos jours (in French). National Assembly of Quebec.)	1841–1844	Unionist; Tory; Independent; then French-Canadian Group
1st Parliament; 1841–1844	George Moffatt (Note: Resigned seat on October 30, 1843: Côté, Political Appointments and Elections, p. 59, note (20).)	1841–1843	Unionist; Government supporter
1st Parliament; 1841–1844	Pierre Beaubien (Note: Elected in by-election, November 22, 1843, filling vacancy caused by George Moffatt's resignation: Côté, Political Appointments and Elections, p. 59, note (21).)	1843–1844 (by-election)	French-Canadian Group
1st Parliament; 1841–1844	Lewis Thomas Drummond (Note: Elected in by-election, April 17, 1844, filling vacancy caused by Benjamin Holmes' resignation: "Biography of Lewis Thomas Drummond". Dictionnaire des parlementaires du Québec de 1792 à nos jours (in French). National Assembly of Quebec.)	1844 (by-election)	French-Canadian Group
2nd Parliament; 1844–1847	George Moffatt	1844–1847	"British" Tory
2nd Parliament; 1844–1847	Clément-Charles Sabrevois de Bleury	1844–1847	"British" Tory
3rd Parliament; 1848–1851	Benjamin Holmes	1848–1851	"English" Liberal; French-Canadian Group; Ministerialist
3rd Parliament; 1848–1851	Louis-Hippolyte LaFontaine	1848–1851	French-Canadian Group; Ministerialist
4th Parliament; 1851–1854	William Badgley	1851–1854	Tory
4th Parliament; 1851–1854	John Young	1851–1854	Rouge
5th Parliament; 1854–1857	Antoine-Aimé Dorion	1854–1857	Rouge
5th Parliament; 1854–1857	Luther Hamilton Holton	1854–1857	Rouge
5th Parliament; 1854–1857	John Young	1854–1857	Rouge
6th Parliament; 1858–1861	Antoine-Aimé Dorion	1858–1861	Rouge
6th Parliament; 1858–1861	Thomas D'Arcy McGee	1858–1861	Rouge
6th Parliament; 1858–1861	John Rose	1858–1861	Conservative

== Abolition ==
Montreal electoral district was abolished in 1861, when it was replaced by three single-member districts, Montreal Centre, Montreal East, and Montreal West.

== See also ==
- List of elections in the Province of Canada
