= John Stephenson (physician) =

Canadian physician and educator

John Stephenson (December 12, 1796 – February 2, 1842) was a Canadian medical doctor and educator, and one of the founders of the Montreal Medical Institution, the first medical school in Canada. He is regarded as one of the founders of McGill University Faculty of Medicine.

== Early days ==
Stephenson was born on December 12, 1796, in Montreal, Lower Canada. He was the youngest of five sons of John Stephenson and Martha Mair. His father was a merchant, who immigrated to Canada from Scotland. He studied at the Collège de Montréal, a Roman Catholic minor seminary in his home town. He wanted to become a physician, but at that time, there was no medical school in Canada.

== Edinburgh Medical School ==
For medical education, Stephenson traveled to Scotland and joined the University of Edinburgh Medical School in 1817. While he was attending the Medical School, he met with his childhood friend, Andrew Fernando Holmes. Holmes was also studying medicine at Edinburgh.

He was born with congenital disorder of the soft palate; he had difficulty in speech. In 1819, he and Holmes went to Paris to be trained under Philibert Joseph Roux, a surgeon at Hôpital de la Charité, for few weeks. In September of that year, Roux performed an hour-long operation on Stephenson and his speech became almost normal.

He obtained his M.D. from Edinburgh in 1820. His thesis, "De velosynthesi", written in Latin, explained one of the first successful surgical repairs of cleft of soft palate.

== Career in Montreal ==
After obtaining his medical degree, Stephenson returned to Montreal. Montreal General Hospital was established in May 1822. Stephenson and three other Edinburgh Medical School alumni – Andrew Fernando Holmes, William Robertson and William Caldwell – became staffs of the hospital. It was Stephenson who convinced those three physicians to join the hospital.

In October 1822, he founded the Medical Institution for medical education. He gave lectures in anatomy, physiology and surgery at the institute. The Institute needed a provincial charter so that it could confer medical qualifications to its students, but it couldn't obtain the charter. Meanwhile, McGill College (now McGill University), which received its royal charter in 1821, needed a functioning faculty.

In 1829, the Montreal Medical Institution was incorporated into McGill College as the college's first faculty; it thus became the first Faculty of Medicine in Canada. Stephenson lectured in anatomy, physiology and surgery at the Faculty of Medicine and had significant influence on the faculty and the university.

He died on February 2, 1842.
