= College of Physicians and Surgeons of Ontario =

Canadian regulatory body

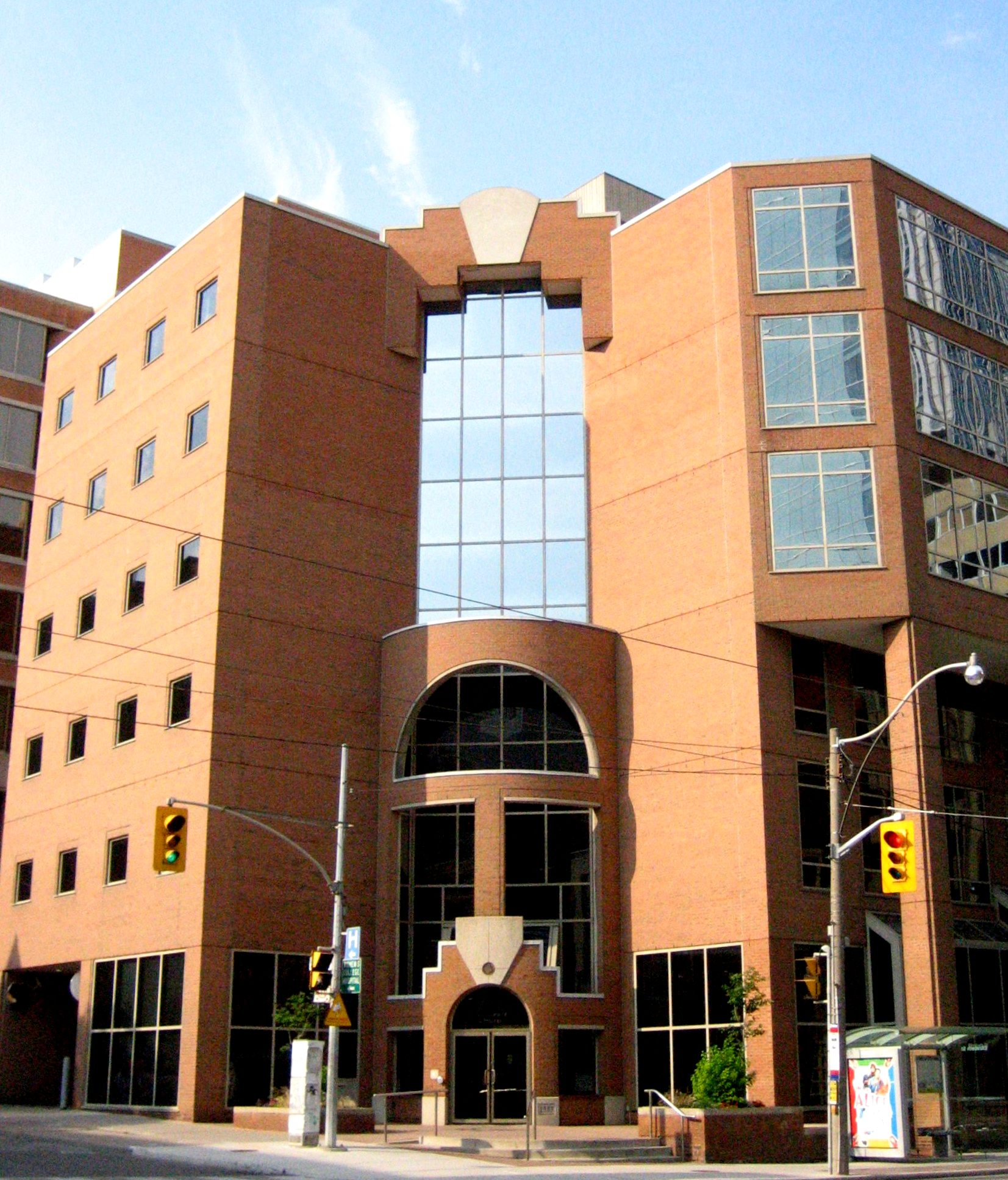
The College of Physicians and Surgeons of Ontario building in Toronto.

The College of Physicians and Surgeons of Ontario (CPSO) is the regulatory college for medical doctors in Ontario, Canada.

The college issues certificates of registration for all doctors to allow them to practise medicine as well as: monitors and maintains standards of practice via assessment and remediation, investigates complaints against doctors, and disciplines those found guilty of professional misconduct and/or incompetence.

The CPSO's power is derived from Regulated Health Professions Act (RHPA), Health Professions Procedural Code under RHPA and the Medicine Act. The college is based in Toronto.

In October 2008, the college was named one of "Canada's Top 100 Employers" by Mediacorp Canada Inc., and was featured in Maclean's newsmagazine. Later that month, the college was also named one of Greater Toronto's Top Employers, which was announced by the Toronto Star newspaper.

== Organization ==
=== Structure and mission ===
Entrance to the College of Physicians and Surgeons of Ontario building in Toronto.

The College of Physicians and Surgeons of Ontario (CPSO) is the self-regulating body for the province's medical profession. The college regulates the practice of medicine to protect and serve the public interest. It issues certificates of registration to doctors to allow them to practise medicine, monitors and maintains standards of practice through peer assessment and remediation, investigates complaints against doctors on behalf of the public, and disciplines doctors who may have committed an act of professional misconduct or incompetence.

The medical profession has been granted a great degree of authority by provincial law, and that authority is exercised through the college. This system of self-regulation is based on the premise that the college must act first and foremost in the interest of the public. All doctors in Ontario must be members of the college in order to practise medicine in the province. The role of the college, as well as its authority and powers, are set out in the Regulated Health Professions Act 1991 (RHPA), the Health Professions Procedural Code under the RHPA and the Medicine Act 1991.

The duties of the college include: issuing certificates of registration to doctors to allow them to practise medicine monitoring and maintaining standards of practice through peer assessment and remediation investigating complaints about doctors on behalf of the public, and conducting discipline hearings when doctors may have committed an act of professional misconduct or incompetence.

In December 2023 the CPSO Council approved a set of governance modernisation initiatives to be effected through by-laws. These included changing the name of the CPSO Council to the Board of Governors (see below). However, this change is cosmetic only as the composition of the CPSO Council / Board of Governors is determined by the Medicine Act 1991.

=== Board of Directors ===
The college is governed by a Board of Directors, formerly known as the College Council. The Medicine Act 1991 stipulates that it shall be composed of:

(a) at least 15 and no more than 16 persons who are members elected in accordance with the by-laws; (b) at least thirteen and no more than fifteen persons appointed by the Lieutenant Governor in Council who are not, (i) members, (ii) members of a College as defined in the Regulated Health Professions Act, 1991, or (iii) members of a Council as defined in the Regulated Health Professions Act, 1991; and (c) three persons selected, in accordance with a by-law made under section 12.1, from among members who are members of a faculty of medicine of a university in Ontario. The College President is elected from and by the Board and serves a one-year term.

Board members sit on one or more committees of the college. Each committee has specific functions, most of which are governed by provincial legislation.

Board meetings are held four times a year, at which time the activities of the college are reviewed and matters of general policy are debated and voted on. Meetings of the Board are no longer open to the public in person but are live streamed on YouTube and may be observed by the public virtually.

The current composition of the Board of Directors is published on the CPSO website.

=== Complaints process ===
A complaint to the CPSO about a physician may be initiated online or by telephone. Details are published on the CPSO "Complaints and Concerns" page. Before calling the CPSO to file a complaint, the CPSO encourages patients to try to resolve the issue with their physician first, where appropriate.

== COVID-19 ==
On March 24, 2020, the CPSO Executive Council met to discuss the potential impact of the COVID-19 pandemic on Council business. The Council declared an emergency under CPSO's Declared Emergency ByLaw and directed to extend the Council Elections for Districts 5 and 10 which were originally scheduled to be held on June 9, 2020. By May 2020, the CPSO noted they were anticipating a high volume of complaints against senior public health officials, and many related to public health measures and delays in cancer surgeries, mammograms and the like.

On April 30, 2021, the CPSO released a statement on “Public Health Misinformation” accusing Ontario doctors of “using social media to spread blatant misinformation and undermine public health measures.” In response, a group of Canadian physicians released a declaration titled the “Declaration of Canadian Physicians for Science and Truth”. They described the CPSO's statement as “unethical, anti-science and deeply disturbing.” As of August 25, 2022, there were 718 signatory physicians and 20,171 on behalf of concerned citizens.

The CPSO strongly encourages all eligible Ontarians to receive a COVID-19 vaccine or booster shot(s).

The CPSO followed up its “Public Health Misinformation” statement by starting disciplinary action against a number of physicians. As of 16 January 2024, 21 physicians have been disciplined, with sanctions including suspension or revocation of registration, undertaking with restrictions or “never reapply” undertaking. See chart for further details. 6 cases are still pending final resolution.

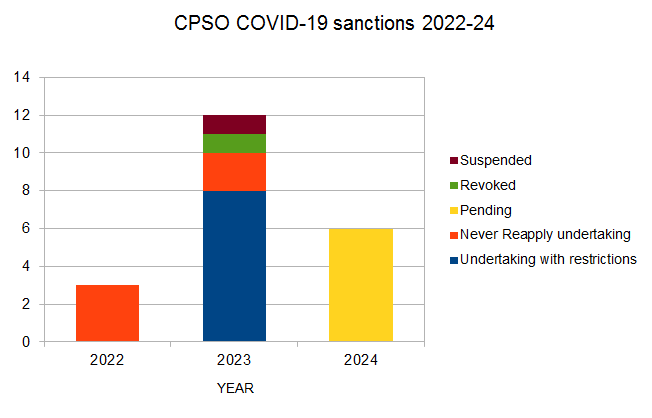
CPSO COVID-19 sanctions 2022-24

== Criticisms associated with the college ==
=== Cautions ===
Between 2007 and 2013 the college issued more than 1,000 "cautions" against practising doctors. Cautions are issued to doctors for transgressions that include providing inadequate treatment, poor record-keeping and raising voices in arguments. However, the college has been criticized in the past for not being transparent to patients as to which doctors have been subject to cautions, and for being more interested in protecting doctors than patients.

=== Block fees ===
Between 2004 and 2011 the college prosecuted four physicians for improperly charging block fees to patients. Block fees are annual fees charged by physicians to allow patients to access services. Physicians are permitted to charge block fees to uninsured patients for services not covered by OHIP, but charging block fees to allow insured patients to access OHIP services is considered to be professional misconduct.

=== The "Transparency Project" ===
In 2013, in response to some of the above criticisms, the college announced that it would begin its "Transparency Project". The goal of the Transparency Project would be to make it easier for patients to gain more information about doctors who have been accused of wrongdoing. The College Council gave its support to a transparency initiative that had four categories. One, an increase in the transparency of the transfer of patient medical records. Two, a proposal that the Notices of Hearing for the college's Discipline Proceedings be posted to a physician's profile on the public register. Third, a proposal that the status of discipline matters as they are proceeding be added to a physician's profile on the public register. Fourth, that reinstatement decisions in their entirety be posted to a physician's profile on the public register.

=== Complaint disposal times ===
In recent years the college has struggled to process an increasing volume of complaints about physicians. In 2007 it successfully lobbied the Ontario Ministry of Health to increase the time limit for disposal of complaints from 120 to 150 days, and to give itself increased powers to extend those time limits. These proposals were contained in amendments to the Regulated Health Professions Act 1991 which were passed by the Ontario Legislative Assembly in 2007 and came into force in 2009. The time taken to dispose of complaints continued to lengthen until the Ontario Ministry of Health commissioned a report, “Streamlining the Physician Complaints Process in Ontario” which reported in 2016 that “More time and money is spent on a disposition in Ontario than in other jurisdictions, with little apparent benefit to the public in terms of better or safer physician services”, “too many complaints and investigations are in the system too long”, and “the 150 day deadline is not met on many occasions”. Following this report, the college improved the efficiency of its complaints procedures, including routing suitable complaints via an Alternative Dispute Resolution (ADR) process, and disposal times are once again coming down.

=== "Never reapply" undertakings ===
A novel solution adopted by the college to the problem of delays in resolving complaints has been to make increasing use of "never reapply" undertakings. A "never reapply" undertaking is an undertaking made by a physician to surrender his or her licence and never reapply for another licence in Ontario or anywhere else in the world. In return, the college promises not to proceed with the complaint, the investigation is terminated and the file closed. These undertakings are probably legally unenforceable both inside and outside Ontario as they would amount to an unreasonable restraint of trade and they are rarely used by other medical regulatory authorities. In the past, such undertakings were only used in the most serious cases, for example sexual abuse of a patient, but they are increasingly being used by the college as a way of disposing of less serious or unspecified complaints. A disadvantage of these undertakings are that they remove physicians from practice who may be able and willing to continue practising but just wish to terminate the investigation.

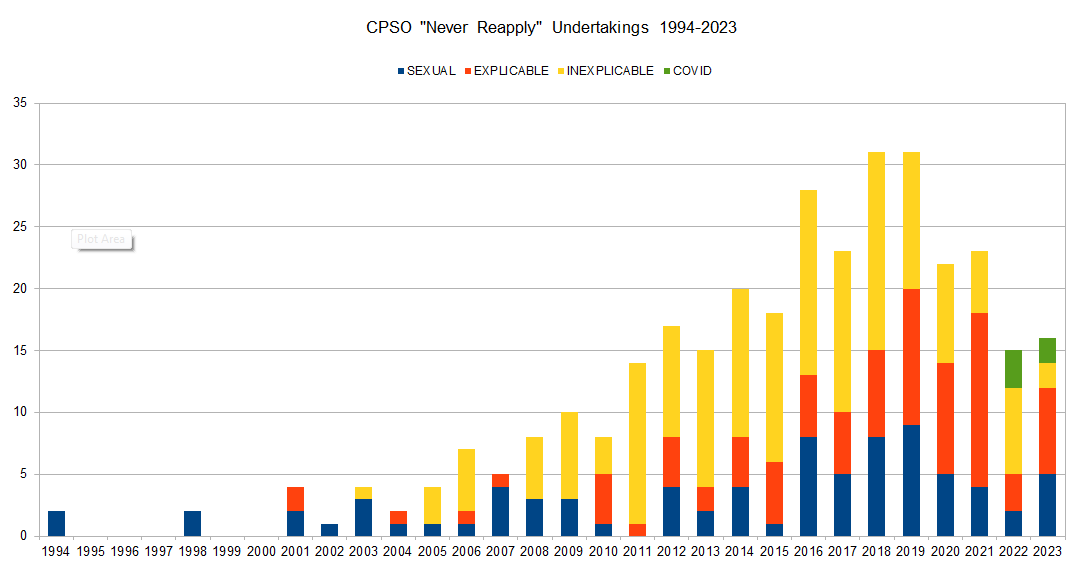
Chart showing the CPSO's use of "never reapply" undertakings from 1994 onwards

This data was extracted from the CPSO online public register by a combination of electronic and manual searching. 330 physicians were identified who had given undertakings to the CPSO never to reapply for a licence either in Ontario alone, or Ontario plus anywhere else in the world.

In each case an attempt was made to identify why the undertaking was given, and the undertakings were allocated into four categories. "Sexual" indicates that there was an allegation of sexual misconduct, either proven or unproven, and involving either patients or co-workers. "Explicable" indicates that the reason for the undertaking was non-sexual, but there appeared to be some other good reason why it was appropriate, for example, gross incompetence, a serious criminal conviction, dishonesty, psychiatric incapacity or a repeated failure to remediate. "Inexplicable" forms the largest category and indicates either that the reason given was vague ("incompetence", "professional misconduct", "failure to uphold the standards of the profession" or similar) or that it appeared to be an inappropriately harsh penalty (overprescribing of opioids, for example, could be easily remedied by placing restrictions on the physician's licence).

The fourth category, appearing for the first time in 2022, is for COVID-19 related undertakings. Since the start of the COVID-19 pandemic, the CPSO has required physicians not to "disseminate false and misleading information" about COVID-19, which may include the physicians' personal opinions about mask wearing, vaccine safety and the effectiveness of certain COVID treatments. Several physicians have been disciplined for allegedly failing to comply with these guidelines, including five to date who have signed "never reapply" undertakings.

=== Proposed amendments to the Regulated Health Professions Act 1991 ===
An application is being made to the Ontario Ministry of Health for amendments to the Regulated Health Professions Act 1991 to update the regulations and address some of the above issues.

== See also ==
- Collège des médecins du Québec
- Ontario Medical Association
- Royal College of Physicians and Surgeons of Canada
