= Andrew Fernando Holmes =

Canadian physician (1797–1860)

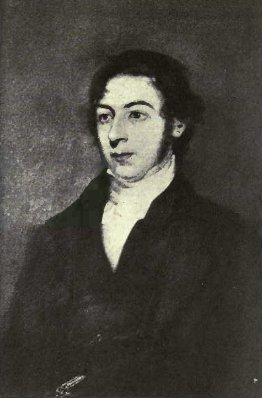
- Born: March 17, 1797; Cadiz, Spain
- Died: October 9, 1860 (aged 63); Montreal, Canada East
- Occupations: medical doctor, professor, college administrator, author, and scientist
- Known for: one of founders of the Montreal Medical Institution

Andrew Fernando Holmes (March 17, 1797 – October 9, 1860) was a Canadian medical doctor, academic, and one of the founders of the Montreal Medical Institution, the first medical school in Canada.

In 1797, Holmes' parents, Thomas Holmes and Susanna Scott, and his older brother, Benjamin were emigrating to North America when they were captured by a French frigate. They were taken to Cádiz, Spain, where Holmes was born. The family eventually reached British North America in 1801, settling in Montreal.

Holmes apprenticed to Daniel Arnoldi, a leading Montreal physician, and was qualified to practise medicine. He then went to Scotland, where he received a diploma from the Royal College of Surgeons of Edinburgh in 1818 and a Doctor of Medicine degree from University of Edinburgh in 1819. Returning to Canada, he practised medicine joining the staff of the Montreal General Hospital in 1822. He founded the Montreal Medical Institution, the first medical school in Canada, in 1823 with John Stephenson. After failing to receive a royal charter, the Montreal Medical Institution joined McGill College to become the McGill College Medical Faculty. Holmes became a founding member of the faculty. In 1843, he was appointed professor of the principles and practice of medicine and became head of the faculty. In 1854, his title was changed to dean.

Holmes died unexpectedly in 1860. In 2020 Richard W Vaudry wrote an extensive biography of Holmes, linking him closely with the world of English-speaking Protestants in Montreal and Quebec.

== Holmes Gold Medal Award ==
In his honour the first Holmes Gold Medal was awarded in 1865. It continues to be awarded annually to the McGill University (Montreal) medical school student who achieves the highest academic standing upon graduation.

The Holmes Gold medal is described in the Canada Medical Journal and Monthly Record of Medical and Surgical Science (v. 1; 1865, p 535-536.) as:

"Since the last convocation, the Medical Faculty in this University determined to establish a gold medal prize to be awarded for superior excellence to a member of the graduating class only. The competitors to be selected from those men whose inaugural dissertation is deemed worthy of receiving one hundred marks, the highest number of marks given for any thesis being two hundred.

The medal is in value about fifty dollars, the dies having been struck in England by Mr. F. Carter of Birmingham. It is to perpetuate the memory of one of the original founders of the school, the late Dr. Holmes, a man who in his walk through life commanded the love and esteem of all who knew him, from his many excellent qualities as a scholar and Christian gentleman. On one side of the medal is seen in bold relief the head of Hippocrates, with the name in Greek characters; and on the obverse is the coat-of-arms of the College, beneath which is the following, "Facultas Medicinæ Donavit". This is surrounded by a wreath of laurel, outside of which are the words, "In memoriam Andreæ F. Holmes, M.D., L.L.D." On the rim of the medal is engraved the name of the successful candidate, with the date.

The medal is given to him who proves himself the best man after special examination by answering, in writing, three questions proposed by each member of the faculty."

After 1877 the Faculty did not require graduating students to submit an 'inaugural dissertation' and the Holmes Gold Medal was awarded to the student who achieves the highest academic standing upon graduation.

Academic offices
Preceded by None	Dean of the McGill University Faculty of Medicine; 1854-1860	Succeeded by G. W. Campbell
