= Quebec College of Physicians =

Canadian professional organization

Collège des médecins du Québec
- Abbreviation: CMQ
- Type: Professional society, Regulatory college
- Legal status: Active
- Headquarters: Montreal, Quebec, Canada
- Region served: Quebec, Canada
- Official languages: French and English
- Website: cmq.org

The Collège des médecins du Québec (CMQ), or Quebec College of Physicians, is a professional organization responsible for setting educational standards for physicians, regulating the practice of medicine, and policing its members at the provincial level in Quebec. Its mission is to promote quality medical care in order to protect the public. Membership with the CMQ is mandatory in order to practice medicine within the province of Quebec, Canada.

== History ==
Originally incorporated in 1847, it was then called the College of Physicians and Surgeons of Lower Canada, and established its own regulations for the study and practice of medicine. The CMQ had Daniel Arnoldi as its first president. Some of the physicians who presided over the CMQ include Wolfred Nelson and Emmanuel Persillier-Lachapelle. In 1974, the name changed to the Corporation professionnelle des médecins du Québec (CPMQ).

In 1994, the CMQ headquarters moved to 2170 René-Lévesque Boulevard West, in Montreal, and then, on 1 May 2016, moved to its current location at 1250 René-Lévesque West, Suite 3500.

Mauril Gaudreault was elected for a first four-year term on 19 October 2018, replacing Charles Bernard, who had been the President and chief executive officer since 2010. He is now facing disciplinary action for having deliberately altered an article of the physicians’ code of ethics in the media during the conflict with the Legault government

=== List of presidents ===
- 1847 - 1849 : Daniel Arnoldi
- 1849 - 1850 : Wolfred Nelson
- 1850 - 1853 : Joseph Morrin
- 1853 - 1856 : Andrew Fernando Holmes
- 1856 - 1859 : Jean-Charles Frémont
- 1859 - 1862 : Archibald Hall
- 1862 - 1865 : William Marsden
- 1865 - 1868 : Joshua Chamberlin
- 1868 - 1871 : Jean-Étienne Landry
- 1871 - 1874 : William E. Scott
- 1874 - 1877 : Robert H. Russell
- 1877 - 1880 : Jean-Philippe Rottot
- 1880 - 1883 : Robert Palmer Howard
- 1883 - 1886 : Charles-Eugène Lemieux
- 1886 - 1889 : William Hales Hingston
- 1889 - 1895 : John Jones Ross
- 1895 - 1898 : Louis-Joseph-Alfred Simard
- 1898 - 1907 : Emmanuel Persillier-Lachapelle
- 1907 - 1914 : Louis-Philippe Normand
- 1914 - 1918 : Arthur Simard
- 1918 - 1926 : Rodolphe Boulet
- 1926 - 1930 : Joseph-Édouard Bélanger
- 1930 - 1938 : Pierre-Calixte Dagneau
- 1938 - 1946 : Joseph-Émile Desrochers
- 1946 - 1961 : Marc Trudel
- 1961 - 1962 : Richard Vance Ward
- 1962 - 1966 : Jean-Baptiste Jobin
- 1966 - 1972 : Gustave Gingras
- 1972 - 1974 : Jules Gosselin
- 1974 - 1994 : Augustin Roy
- 1994 - 1998 : Roch Bernier
- 1998 - 2010 : Yves Lamontagne
- 2010 - 2018 : Charles Bernard
- 2018–present : Mauril Gaudreault

== Medical workforce ==
Registration with the CMQ is mandatory in order to practice medicine within the province of Quebec. As of 31 December 2018, the total number of physicians registered with the CMQ was 23,236. Of these, there were 12,143 male physicians, 11,093 female physicians, and 2,288 registered as inactive.

== Mission ==
Its mission is "Quality medicine at the service of the public".

To fulfil its mission, the CMQ:

- Monitors and assesses medical practice in Quebec
- Makes recommendations in order to improve medical practice in Quebec
- Receives and responds to complaints from the public
- Ensures and promotes the maintenance of physician competence
- Verifies the competence of future physicians and their fitness to practice medicine
- Issues permits and authorizations to practice
- Monitors the illegal practice of medicine
- Collaborates with other professional orders in order to maximize the deployment of health and social services provided to Quebecers
- Develops practice guides and guidelines
- Takes a position, including in the media, on various health topics

To perform its functions, the CMQ relies on a board of directors and an executive committee, and has standing committees and six divisions: the Practice Enhancement Division, the Inquiries Division, the Medical Education Division, the Legal Services Division, the Finances and Information Technology Division and the Executive Office. The Executive Office coordinates the activities of all the divisions and implements the decisions and orientations of the board of directors and the executive committee.

The directors, employees, and mandataries of the CMQ have adopted ethical principles that they commit to following to fulfill the mission.

All this information is presented together in the CMQ's Statement of services for citizens, which reaffirms its commitments to the public, future physicians, and its members.

== Board of directors and executive committee ==
The executive committee exercises the powers delegated by the board of directors. It is composed of five directors. Currently, it is composed of:

- Suzanne Lalonde (public representative)
- Guy Morissette (elected director)
- Mauril Gaudreault (elected director and president)
- Nathalie Saad (elected director and vice-president)
- Martin Laliberté (elected director)

The CMQ's Board of Directors oversees the general administration of the CMQ's affairs and the application of the provisions of the Professional Code, the Medical Act, and the regulations that flow from it. It exercises all the rights, powers, and prerogatives of the CMQ, except those which are the responsibility of the members of the CMQ meeting in general assembly. The board of directors is composed of nineteen directors, elected for four-year terms, and distributed as follows, including the Chairman:

- fourteen elected directors, who are physicians representing the regions within the province of Quebec;
- one elected director aged 35 or under at the time of election;
- four non-physician administrators appointed by the Office des professions du Québec who are often called "representatives of the public," since they are not members of the order in which they sit.

== Regulations ==
Quebec physicians are subject to the Medical Act, the Professional Code, and the various regulations adopted by the CMQ. In order to fulfill the various mandates incumbent upon it and arising from its mission, the CMQ regularly develops or revises regulations intended to ensure the practice of medicine in Quebec. It attempts to maintain ethical standards to ensure safe and high quality medicine for the public.

== Controversies ==
- In 2007, foreign doctors stated that "the current selection process promotes the exclusion and stigmatization of immigrants". The same year, the CMQ explains that it is not the only player in the decision to accept or not foreign doctors.
- In June 2008, the CMQ expressed disagreement vis-à-vis the C-484 project, which would "give a legal status to a partner and to forcibly criminalize abortion".
- In 2018, the CMQ came under direct criticism for instituting and promoting institutional harassment through corrupt syndics.

== See also ==
- College of Family Physicians of Canada
- Royal College of Physicians and Surgeons of Canada
- College of Physicians and Surgeons of Ontario
