= Daniel Arnoldi =

German Canadian physician (1774–1849)

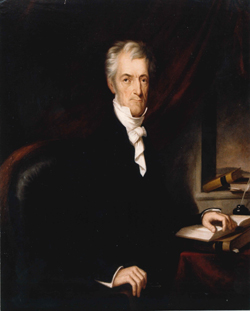
- Born: March 7, 1774; Montreal
- Died: July 19, 1849 (aged 75)
- Occupation: doctor

Daniel Arnoldi (March 7, 1774 – July 19, 1849) was a Canadian medical doctor. He was born in Montreal and received his education in England and Montreal, obtaining his medical licence in 1795. He practised in many towns in what is now Quebec and Ontario before establishing a practice in Montreal. He became a medical examiner in 1812, but was excluded in 1823 when the governor decided that only doctors from Montreal General Hospital could be examiners. In 1831, when the power to appoint examiners was transferred to a licensing board chosen by doctors, Arnoldi was appointed to the board. He became the board's chair in 1834 but resigned a few months later when he disagreed with the politics of the board.

In 1836 Arnoldi was fined 10 shillings for assaulting a black man. During the Lower Canada Rebellion he was accused of desecrating a corpse, but this was disputed by a parish priest. In 1847 he was appointed the first president of the College of Physicians and Surgeons of Lower Canada. He was infected with cholera in 1849 and died later that year.

== Early life ==
Arnoldi was born in Montreal on March 7, 1774. His father was Peter Arnoldi, a soldier from Germany. His mother was Philipina Maria Horn (nicknamed Phébé).

Arnoldi went to secondary school in England then returned to Montreal to learn about medicine and received his medical licence in 1795.

== Early career ==
Arnoldi originally practised medicine in Rivière-du-Loup, then in 1797 moved to the Bay of Quinte in Upper Canada. In 1800 he moved to La Prairie, Quebec, then returned to Montreal two years later.

In Montreal, Arnoldi also trained medical students such as Robert Nelson and Andrew Fernando Holmes. In 1812 he became a medical examiner in Montreal. In 1814, he signed an address defending Jonathan Sewell and James Monk against the Legislative Assembly of Lower Canada.

== Medical examiner ==
In 1823, George Ramsay, 9th Earl of Dalhousie, the governor of Quebec, decided that only doctors from Montreal General Hospital could be examiners, which excluded Arnoldi. This caused Arnoldi to align himself with the Patriote movement. That year, he met with Montreal doctors to petition stricter measures taken to teach and practise medicine in the colony.

A new law was passed in 1831 that transferred the responsibility of appointing examiners away from the governor and towards a vote by licensed physicians in each area. At its first meeting, the doctors in the Montreal district elected Arnoldi to the licensing board, excluding the doctors from McGill College. After his election to the board, Arnoldi seemed to distance himself politically from the Patriotes, supporting an English party candidate in a by-election over a Patriote candidate in 1832 and supported military intervention at a riot concerning the election. He was appointed as the doctor to the Montreal jail in 1833 and as a justice of the peace. When an inmate died in the prison, the legislative assembly asked for Arnoldi to resign from his position, which he did.

In 1834, he was nominated to chair the licensing board, and although a group of doctors from McGill College opposed him, he was elected. Arnoldi resigned as chair four months later, disagreeing with the board's political views.

In 1836 Arnoldi, in his role as a magistrate, ordered a constable to arrest a black serving girl who had left her mistress's home. Alexander Grant, a prominent black businessman in Montreal, went to Arnoldi's home to advocate for the girl. Arnoldi grabbed Grant by the collar and kicked him. Grant sued Arnoldi and at the subsequent trial the jury ignored the judge's advice and found Arnoldi guilty for assaulting Grant. Arnoldi, who had pleaded not guilty, received a fine of 10 shillings (1/2 Canadian pound).

== Lower Canada Rebellion and return to the board ==
In 1837 he was reappointed as the Montreal prison physician. During the Lower Canada Rebellion many Patriotes were imprisoned in the Montreal jail and accused Arnoldi of not taking care of them, while others praised Arnoldi for his humanity during the rebellion. Arnoldi and his son, François-Cornelius-Thomas, were accused of desecrating the corpse of Jean-Olivier Chénier, a member of the Patriotes who was excommunicated as a Catholic for using firearms in church grounds where he was ultimately killed by government forces. A parish priest named Jacques Paquin examined the body and refuted the accusation.

Most of the licensing board was expelled from Lower Canada following the rebellion, so Arnoldi was reappointed in 1839. During this time he regularly spoke in favour of increasing standards and the regulations for teaching and practising medicine in the province. He remained with the board until it was dissolved in 1847.

In 1847, the College of Physicians and Surgeons of Lower Canada was established to regulate the medical profession, and Arnoldi was appointed as its first president. The following year he was given an honorary degree from McGill College.

== Personal life and death ==
Arnoldi married Élisabeth Franchère. They had three sons and seven daughters together. One of his daughters, Élisabeth, married Benjamin Holmes, a leading figure in the Montreal banking community and a member of the Legislative Assembly of the Province of Canada.

Arnoldi was a founding member of the German Society of Montreal and was their first vice-president. He was appointed as its president in 1840.

During a cholera outbreak in Montreal, Arnoldi was infected with the disease and died there on July 19, 1849.
