= Canada Corn Act 1843 =

Act of the Parliament of the United Kingdom

Duties on Wheat, etc. Act 1843
- Act of Parliament
- Parliament of the United Kingdom
- Long title: An Act for reducing the Duty on Wheat and Wheat Flour, the Produce of the Province of Canada, imported thence into the United Kingdom.
- Citation: 6 & 7 Vict. c. 29
- Territorial extent: United Kingdom

Dates
- Royal assent: 12 July 1843
- Commencement: 10 October 1843 (Note: Section 1.)
- Repealed: 6 August 1861
Other legislation
Repealed by	Statute Law Revision Act 1861

Status: Repealed

Text of statute as originally enacted

The Canada Corn Act 1843 was an act of the British Parliament and allowed Canadian grains (then referred to as corn) to enter the British market at reduced duties. The act was repealed in 1846.

== History ==
=== Origins ===
British passage of the Importation Act 1815 (55 Geo. 3. c. 26) – the Corn Law – impacted the market for Canadian grains by restricting their importation into Britain, despite the fact Canada was part of the British Empire.

== Enactment ==
The 1843 act was enacted to provide some relief to grain farmers in Upper Canada, by reducing the duty of Canadian wheat imported into Britain to (a nominal) 1 shilling a quarter.

The reduced tariff led to increasingly profitable shipping through the St. Lawrence route. To attract business for shipping businesses in the United States, the American government responded by allowing Canadian grain bound for Britain to pass through the Erie Canal without import duties.

The act allowed for the importation to the UK of Canadian grain, be it processed or not. Accordingly, a trade sprang up in American grain, shipped to Canada for milling, and then on to the UK. This impetus caused a boom in the Canadian flour-milling industry.

=== Repeal ===
After a short time, the advantages to Canada of the Corn Act were undone when British Prime Minister Sir Robert Peel moved Britain towards free trade. A shortage of food caused by the Great Famine of Ireland created the need for cheap imported grain, and the act was repealed in 1846.

This was seen at the time as a blow to Canada by abolition of the (effective) imperial preference the act had created; the impact of the repeal to grain exports in practice, in the later 1840s and 1850s, remains a subject of historical debate.

== Subsequent developments ==
The whole act was repealed by section 1 of, and the schedule to, the Statute Law Revision Act 1861 (24 & 25 Vict. c. 101), which came into force on 6 August 1861.

== See also ==
- Corn Laws
- Anti-Corn Law League
- History of agriculture in Canada

== Bibliography ==
- Denison, Merrill (1955). The Barley and the Stream. McClelland and Stewart.
