= Montreal Annexation Manifesto =

The Montreal Annexation Manifesto was a political document dated September 14, 1849, and signed in Montreal, Canada East, calling for the Province of Canada's annexation by the United States.

The manifesto was published in two versions (October 11, 1849, and December 1849) by the Annexation Association, an alliance of 325 Montreal businessmen. (Note: William Tetley lists the signatories in his article "Cornelius Krieghoff, the Shakspeare Club and the Annexation Manifesto".) Most of these were English-speaking Tories, who were opposed to Britain's abolition of the Corn Laws, which ended preferential colonial trade, and by its consent to the Rebellion Losses Bill, and French Canadian nationalists who supported the republican system of government in the United States. These businessmen believed that so long as Canada was under British rule, it would be subjected to the interests of elements of Britain's aristocracy and businessmen. Louis-Joseph Papineau, leader of the Parti canadien, too had believed a similar subjection occurred, perpetrated by France.

The signatories believed that, given the tiny population and limited transportation routes in Canada compared to that of the United States, the abolition of customs duties at such an early point in Canada's economic development would be disastrous for Canadian business. They predicted a lack of foreign capital investment leading to economic downturn and massive job losses.

News of the annexation movement and its manifesto was widely reported in New York. The New-York Daily Tribune sent a correspondent to Montreal. The New York Herald and New York Times newspapers both responded with editorials proposing that the British colony should first negotiate independence from the UK's rule, as an intermediate step before joining with the United States.

Future Prime Minister of Canada John Abbott was a signatory to the manifesto, though he later described that action as a youthful error.

The manifesto was strongly opposed by members of the British American League and by leading politicians such as Robert Baldwin plus the followers of Louis-Hippolyte Lafontaine. After the signing of the Canadian–American Reciprocity Treaty in 1854, the annexation movement died out.

== See also ==
- Annexationist movements of Canada
- Manifest Destiny
