= Rebellion Losses Bill =

1849 law in the Province of Canada

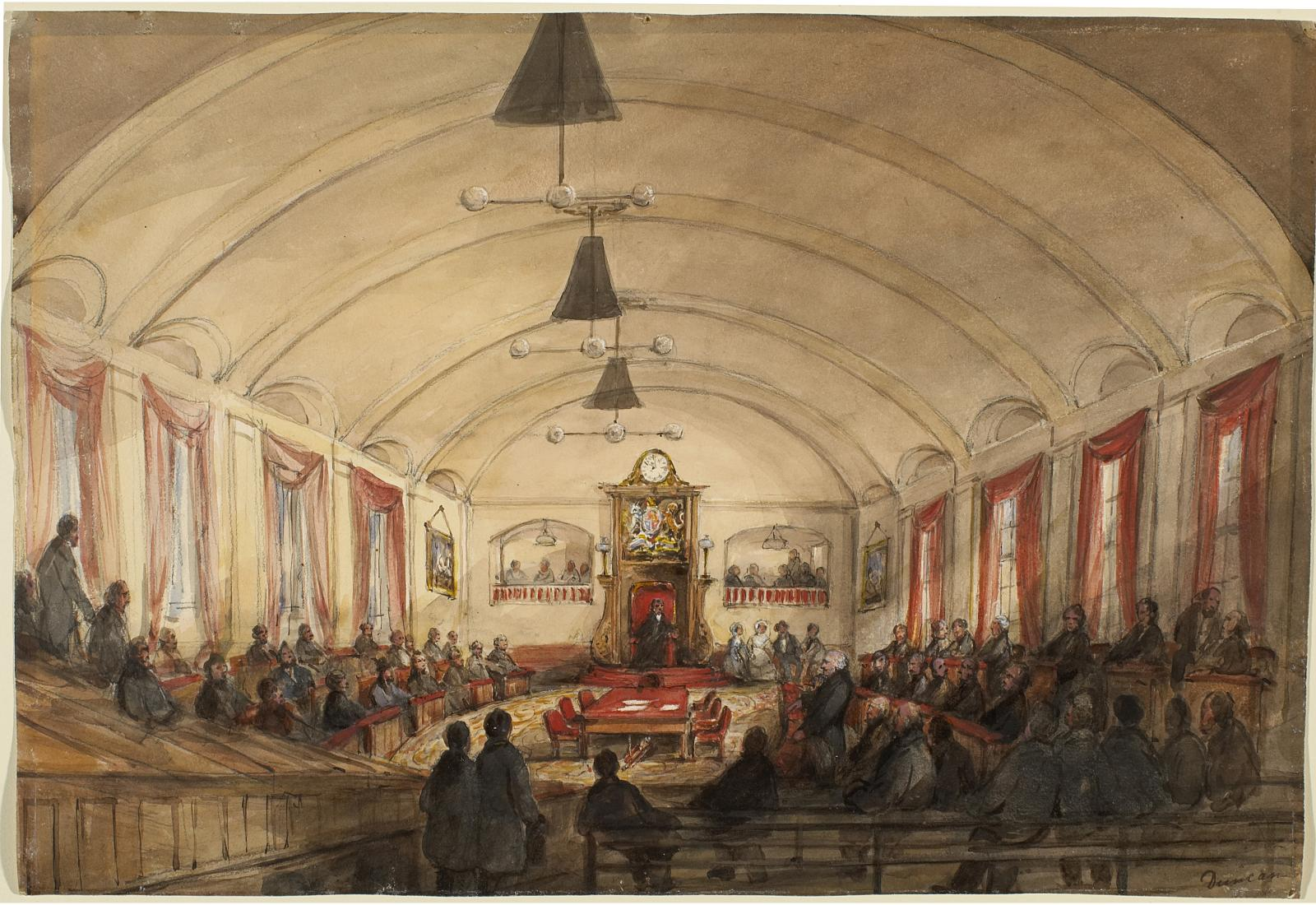

Parliament of the Province of Canada
- Long title: An Act to provide for the Indemnification of Parties in Lower Canada whose Property was destroyed during the Rebellion in the years 1837 and 1838
- Citation: SProvC 1849, c. 58
- Enacted by: Legislative Assembly of the Province of Canada
- Enacted by: Legislative Council of the Province of Canada
- Royal assent: April 25, 1849

Legislative history

Initiating chamber: Legislative Assembly of the Province of Canada
- Introduced by: Louis-Hippolyte Lafontaine
- First reading: February 27, 1849
- Second reading: March 2, 1849
- Third reading: March 9, 1849

Revising chamber: Legislative Council of the Province of Canada
- Third reading: March 15, 1849 (Legislative Council)

Related legislation
- An Act to authorise the appointment of Commissioners to investigate the claims of certain Inhabitants of this Province, for losses sustained during the late unnatural Rebellion, SUC 1838, c. 13; An Act to make provision for the payment of certain losses, sustained by sundry individuals therein named, SUC 1839, c. 68.
- Status: Spent

The Rebellion Losses Bill (full name: An Act to provide for the Indemnification of Parties in Lower Canada whose Property was destroyed during the Rebellion in the years 1837 and 1838) was a controversial law enacted by the legislature of the Province of Canada in 1849. Its passage and subsequent royal assent, this being an affirmation of responsible government in the colony, by the Governor General, James Bruce, 8th Earl of Elgin makes the bill a landmark piece of legislation in Canadian political history.

The bill was enacted to compensate Lower Canadians who lost property during the Rebellions of 1837 with measures similar to those providing compensation in Upper Canada. Two factors made this measure controversial. Even though participants in the Rebellion could not be compensated with taxpayer's money, sympathy for the Rebellion was more widespread in Lower Canada so that compensation in Lower Canada was seen as "giving money to the rebels". Secondly, the damage done by the army far exceeded the damage done by the rebels, so that enacting provisions to compensate for damages done by the army was considered an act of disloyalty to the Crown.

The enactment of the bill angered some of Montreal's Tory citizens and provoked weeks of violent disturbances known as the Montreal Riots. These culminated in the burning of the Parliament building on April 25, 1849, which at the time was in Montreal.

== Draper–Viger government ==
On February 28, 1845, the representatives sitting in the Legislative Assembly unanimously adopted the text of an address asking Governor Metcalfe to take measures to compensate the inhabitants of Lower Canada whose properties were damaged or destroyed during the armed conflict of 1837–8. Prior to that, in the course of the last session of the Parliament of Upper Canada on October 23, 1840, the representatives had passed an act (3 Vict. c. 76) to indemnify certain parties for losses incurred during the uprising in that province in 1837. A credit of £40,000 had been appropriated to address claims made by inhabitants, but no amount had been spent because the treasury of the province was empty. Amending an act passed in 1838, the act of 1840 provided for the indemnification of civilians whose property had been damaged without enquiring into the presumed loyalty of persons during the armed conflict. On its part, the Special Council of Lower Canada had also issued an ordinance, in 1838, to indemnify certain parties, but on the basis of their presumed loyalty to the crown. On March 29, 1845, the governor assented to a bill allocating the revenue from the tavern licences in Canada West to the payment of claims by habitants settled in the former Upper Canada who had still not received any compensation. A sum of £38,658 was raised between April 5, 1845, and January 24, 1849, by the means of this law. Later, in 1846, the revenues from wedding licences were also allocated for the same purpose. Following the adoption of the address to the governor in 1845, the Draper–Viger government set up, on November 24, a commission to enquire into the claims the inhabitants of Lower Canada had sent since 1838, to determine those that were justified and provide an estimate of the amount to be paid. The five commissioners, Joseph Dionne, P. H. Moore, Jacques Viger, John Simpson and Joseph-Ubalde Beaudry, submitted their first report in April 1846. They received instructions from the government to distinguish between claims made by persons participating in the rebellion and those who had given no support to the insurrectionist party. The total of the considered claims receivable amounted to £241,965, 10s. and 5d., but the commissioners were of the opinion that following a more thorough enquiry into the claims they were unable to make, the amount to be paid by the government would likely not go beyond £100,000. The Assembly passed a motion on June 9, 1846, authorizing compensation of £9,986 for claims studied prior to the presentation of the report. Nothing further was accomplished on this question until the dissolution of parliament on December 6, 1847.

== Baldwin–Lafontaine government ==
The general election of January 1848 changed the composition of the House of Assembly in favour of the opposition party, the moderate reformists led by Robert Baldwin and Louis-Hippolyte Lafontaine. The new governor, Lord Elgin, who arrived in the colony on January 30, first formed a government that did not have the support of the majority of the members in the House. These withdrew their support of the Executive by a vote of no-confidence on March 3. On March 7, governor Elgin called in Baldwin and Lafontaine, respectively leaders of the majority parties in both sections of the united province, to the Executive Council. On March 11, 11 new ministers entered the council.

On January 29, 1849, Lafontaine moved to form a committee of the whole House on February 9 to "take into consideration the necessity of establishing the amount of Losses incurred by certain inhabitants in Lower Canada during the political troubles of 1837 and 1838, and of providing for the payment thereof". The consideration of this motion was pushed ahead on several occasions. The opposition party, which denounced the desire of the government to "pay the rebels", showed itself reluctant to begin the study of the question which was on hold since 1838. Its members proposed various amendments to Lafontaine's motion: a first, on February 13, to report the vote within ten days "to give time for the expression of the feelings of the country"; a second one, on February 20, declaring that the House had "no authority to entertain any such proposition" since the Governor-General had not recommended that the House "make provision for liquidating the claims for Losses incurred by the Rebellions in Lower Canada, during the present session". The amendments were rejected and the committee was eventually formed on Tuesday, February 20, but the House was adjourned.

The debates that took place between February 13 and 20 were particularly intense and, in the House, the verbal violence of the representatives soon yielded to physical violence. Tory MPPs Henry Sherwood, Allan MacNab and Prince attacked the legitimacy of the proposed measure because according to them it rewarded the "rebels" of yesterday and constituted an insult to the "loyal" subjects who had fought against them in 1837 and 1838. On February 15, executive councillors Francis Hincks and William Hume Blake retorted in the same tone and Blake even went as far as claiming the Tories to be the true rebels, because, he said, it was they who had violated the principles of the British constitution and caused the civil war of 1837–38. Blake refused to apologize after his speech, and a mêlée burst out among the spectators standing on the galleries. The speaker of the House had them expelled and a confrontation between MacNab and Blake was avoided by the intervention of the Sergeant at Arms.

On February 16, John A. Macdonald, opposition MPP for the riding of Kingston, provoked William Hume Blake to a duel. While Blake was reading excerpts from a document, Macdonald interrupted him to request that he read the phrases and paragraphs in full. Blake replied that he would read whatever he wanted to read. Macdonald did not appreciate the reply and passed a written note to Blake which provoked him to a duel. The two men left the room to go outside. Soon after, the Speaker suspended the sitting and sent the sergeant at arms to bring them back to their duty. Macdonald came back while Blake could not be found. He was asked to appear before the bar of the House on Monday, February 19 to give explanations for his departure. The House accepted his explanation. The two men assured the members of the House that the duel had been cancelled.

The English-language press of the capital (The Gazette, Courier, Herald, Transcript, Witness, Punch) participated in the movement of opposition to the indemnification measure. A single daily, the Pilot, owned by cabinet member Francis Hinks, supported the government. In the French-language press (La Minerve, L'Avenir), the measure was unanimously supported.

On February 17, the leading Tory MPPs held a public meeting to protest against the measure. George Moffatt was elected chairman and various public men such as Allan MacNab, Prince, Gugy, Macdonald, Rose and others gave speeches. The meeting prepared a petition to the governor asking him to dissolve the parliament and call new elections, or to reserve the assent of the bill for the Queen's pleasure, that is to say, to defer the question to the UK Parliament. The press reported that Lafontaine was burned in effigy that night.

On February 22, Henry John Boulton, MPP for Norfolk, introduced an amendment that all persons having pleaded guilty or having been found to be guilty of high treason should not receive compensation from the government. The government party supported the amendment, but the gesture had no effect on the opposition, which persisted in denouncing the measure as amounting to "paying the rebels". Certain liberal MPPs, including Louis-Joseph Papineau and Pierre-Joseph-Olivier Chauveau, opposed the amendment because, according to them, it resulted in the recognition, by the government, of the legality of the military court created by former acting governor John Colborne in order to speedily execute the prisoners of 1839.

On February 23, Lafontaine presented a series of seven resolutions which included the introduction of a bill to indemnify inhabitants for their losses during the armed conflict of 1837–1838. The bill, entitled Bill to provide for the Indemnification of Parties in Lower Canada whose Property was destroyed during the Rebellion in the years 1837 and 1838, authorized total payments of £90,000.

The seven resolutions were adopted individually on February 27, and the bill was introduced the same day, then read a second time on March 2.

On March 9, the Legislative Assembly passed the bill by a vote of 47 to 18. MPPs from the former district of Upper Canada voted in favour, 17 to 14, while those of the former Lower Canada voted 30 to 4 in favour. Six days later, the Legislative Council approved the bill 20 to 14.

== Burning of the Parliament Building ==
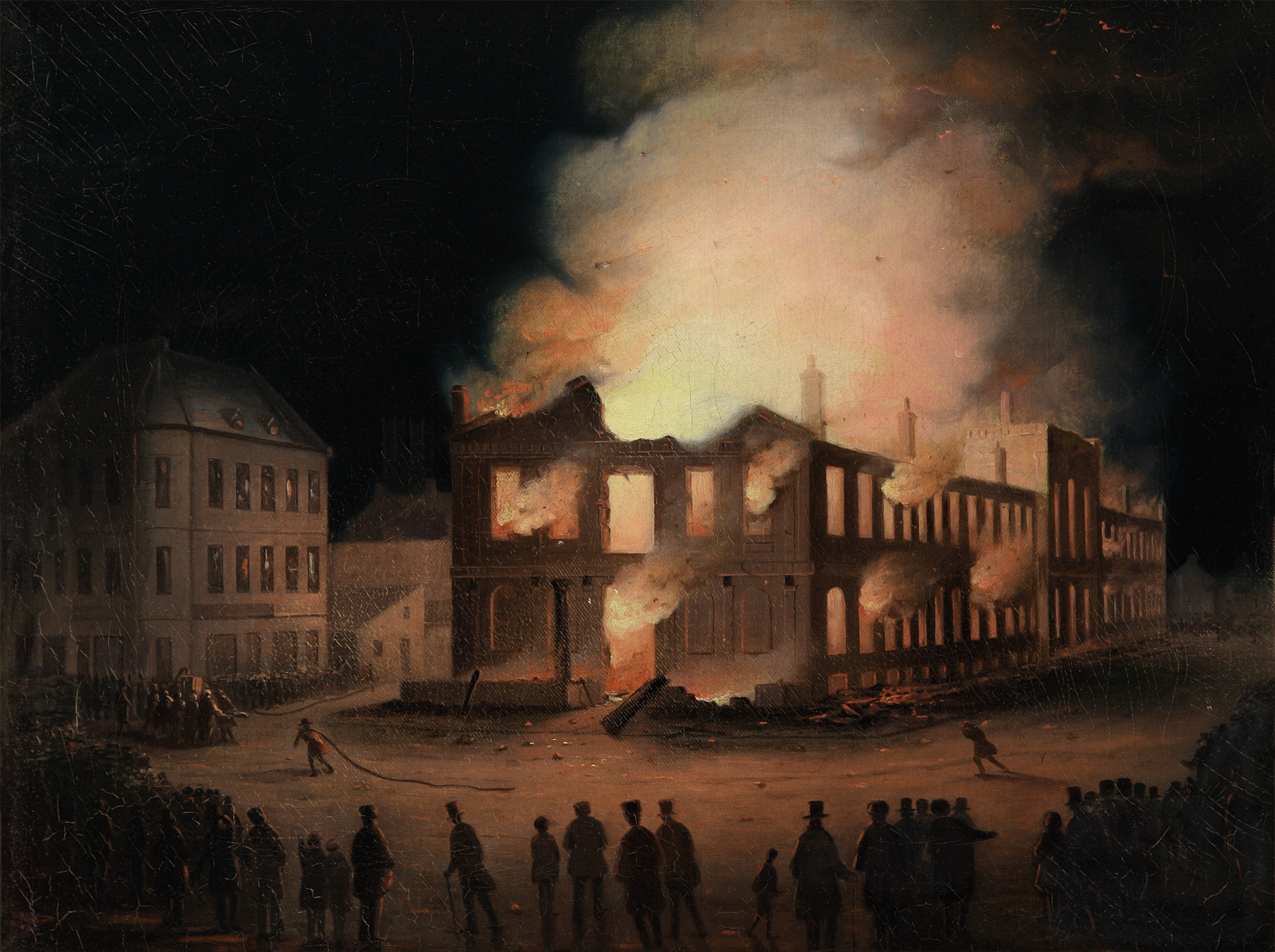
Burning of the Montreal Parliament Building after passage of the Rebellion Losses Bill

Once the bill was passed by both houses of the Parliament, the Lafontaine–Baldwin ministry submitted it to Lord Elgin for assent. Some outraged English-Canadians demanded the governor refuse assent. Lord Elgin had his own misgivings about the bill, making many Tory supporters confident that the governor would reject the bill. Elgin nonetheless gave royal assent to the bill on April 25, 1849.

Montreal's English population was incensed. Elgin's carriage was pelted with stones and rotten eggs, and by the evening a riot had developed which lasted for two days and involved thousands of people. By the time the rioting had ended, mobs had caused thousands of dollars in damage and razed the Montreal Parliament building. Despite the violent opposition, Lord Elgin's grant of assent established the principle of responsible government in the Province of Canada.

== See also ==
- Stony Monday Riot
