= Clément-Charles Sabrevois de Bleury =

Canadian politician

The Honourable Clément-Charles Sabrevois de Bleury
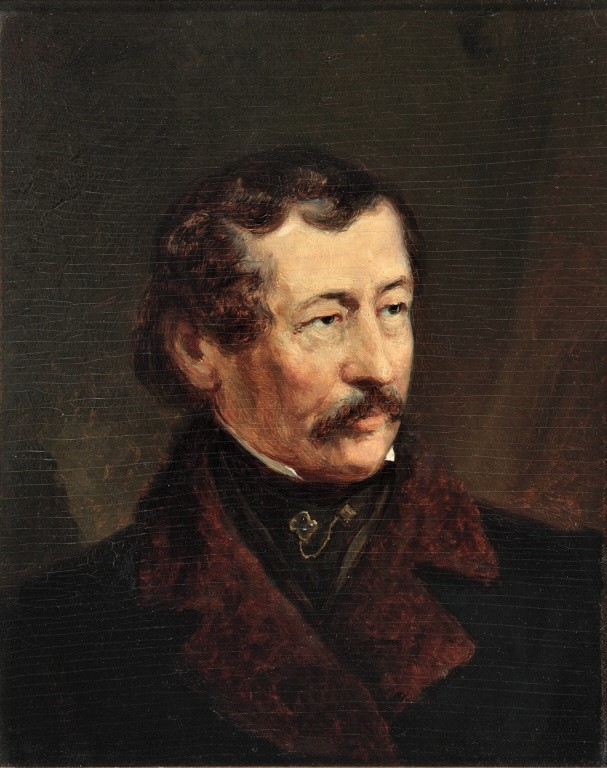

Member of the Legislative Assembly of Lower Canada for Richelieu
- Incumbent
- Assumed office 1832

Member of the Legislative Council of Lower Canada
- In office 1838–1839

Personal details
- Born: October 28, 1798 William-Henry, Lower Canada, British Empire
- Died: September 15, 1862 (aged 63) Saint-Vincent-de-Paul, Canada East
- Education: Collège Saint-Raphaël

Lt.-Colonel The Hon. Clément-Charles Sabrevois de Bleury (October 28, 1798 – September 15, 1862) of Montreal was a soldier, seigneur, lawyer, politician, newspaper founder and noted duellist. Bleury Street in Montreal is named for him. His nephews included the Prime Minister of Quebec, Sir Charles Boucher de Boucherville, and Louis-Tancrède Bouthillier, from whose house the City of Outremont takes its name.

== Early life ==
Clément-Charles Sabrevois de Bleury was born into an old military family at William-Henry, Lower Canada, October 28, 1798. He was the son of Commandant Clément-Christophe Sabrevois de Bleury (1755–1827) and Amélia Bowers, daughter of a retired British army officer at Halifax, possibly Captain Daniel Bower of Parrsborough. His paternal ancestor, a younger son of Henri de Sabrevois, Sieur de Sermonville, came from Garancières-en-Beauce to New France in 1685 as a young Lieutenant of an infantry company; later made a Chevalier de Saint-Louis. In 1764, his grandfather sold the family seigneuries at Sabrevois and Bleury to General Gabriel Christie for £7,300. Sabrevois de Bleury grew up in Montreal at what is now known as La Maison Clément-Sabrevois de Bleury, situated on Rue Saint-Gabriel.

== Law and Military ==
From 1809 to 1815, he was educated in Montreal at the Collège Saint-Raphaël. He entered the legal offices of his brother-in-law, Basile-Benjamin Trottier Desrivières-Beaubien, and was called to the Bar of Montreal in 1819. He soon gained a brilliant reputation and "won over Montreal's high society by his charm, elegant manners, and refined style of living". His family background and his skill in arms gained him a commission in 1825 as a Lieutenant in the 3rd Battalion of Montreal militia. In 1830, he was promoted Captain in the Chasseurs Canadiens. In 1838, he was promoted Major and ten years later he was appointed Lieutenant-Colonel commanding the Montreal Rifles.

== Politics ==
In 1832, after the resignation of François-Roch de Saint-Ours, he was elected to parliament for Richelieu, supporting the Patriote movement. In his early political career he followed the lead of Louis-Joseph Papineau, but from 1835 laid his support behind the more moderate Elzéar Bédard.

Bleury served as an alderman for Montreal from 1839 until late 1844, when he was again elected to the legislature, and once again in 1847. Again, he supported the government on most issues, though he also opposed them on some. He was not a candidate in the 1847–48 elections.

== Duel with Charles-Ovide Perrault ==
On January 8, 1836, he became embroiled in an altercation on the floor of the House with Charles-Ovide Perrault, the Patriote representative for Vaudreuil. The point of issue between them was who should, and who should not, be called before a committee that was looking into the sale of potash. The exchange came to an end with Bleury returning to his seat and grumbling aloud about having to conduct business 'with filth'. Perrault was angered by the insult and went to see Louis-Joseph Papineau about it. Papineau suggested, in pontifical manner, that it would be best to meet with Bleury somewhere outside the House, and let him know that the insult had been noticed.

Perrault took this to mean that he should teach the man a lesson. When next they met, in the dark of night on an icy patch of road near the Battery, he threw the first punch. What ensued was a farcical fist fight in which the combatants were unable to keep their footing on the ice as they flailed away at each other. It only ended when Perrault landed a blow which knocked Bleury down, and then, unable to retain his balance, fell on top of him. The two were finally separated by officers.

The following morning, Bleury, wanting revenge, sent a peremptory note, transmitted by Aaron Ezekiel Hart, to Perrault demanding satisfaction, and a duel was set. Bleury was quite confident, as he had already fought three duels before.

They met for the duel in the woods of L'Ancienne-Lorette at three o'clock in the evening. Their seconds placed the two men 36 feet apart, loaded the pistols, then set about trying to negotiate a compromise, talking with each other, then their principals. At last a solution was worked out. The seconds negotiated a peaceful and honourable resolution of the dispute, both Perrault and Bleury apologized to each other, shook hands, and discharged their pistols into the air to end the matter. They returned to their respective carriages, proceeding to a tavern for a drink before going back to Quebec.

Perrault lost his life the following year at the battle of Saint-Denis on the Richelieu. On April 5 that same year, Bleury fought another duel with Ludger Duvernay, the owner of La Minerve, which ended with Duvernay being shot in the right knee.

== Death ==
Clément-Charles Sabrevois de Bleury died September 15, 1862, at his manor house at Saint-Vincent-de-Paul, near Laval, Canada East at the age of 63. He is buried in Notre Dame Cathedral, Montreal. After his death, Louis-Tancrède Bouthillier, a nephew by marriage, bought the heavily mortgaged manor house.

== See also ==
- List of duels
- Legislative Assembly of Lower Canada
- History and Tree of the Sabrevois family
- Manoir Sabrevois de Bleury
