= Highland Society =

Highland Society may refer to:

- Edinburgh University Highland Society
- Royal Highland and Agricultural Society of Scotland, also known as the Highland Society of Edinburgh
- Highland Society of London
- Highland society or Celtic society, the general terms for such organisations
