= James Johnston (Upper Canada politician) =

Upper Canada politician and businessman

Member of the Legislative Assembly of the Province of Canada for Carleton
- In office 1841–1846
- Preceded by: New position
- Succeeded by: George Lyon

Personal details
- Born: Unknown Ireland
- Died: June 16, 1849 Bytown, Canada West
- Occupation: Journalist, publisher, businessman

James Johnston (died June 16, 1849) was a fiery-tempered businessman and political figure in Upper Canada (later Canada West, now the province of Ontario).

Johnston was born in Ireland and came to Upper Canada in 1815, moving to Bytown (now Ottawa, Ontario) in 1827. He worked as an auctioneer and merchant, as well as acquiring property holdings. He was a member of the Orange Order.

A man of feuds, in 1831 Johnston and Alexander Christie, a journalist of Scottish background, were accused of jostling and threatening a solicitor for the British military authorities during a time of tension between the town residents and the military. However, not long afterwards, Johnston was complaining to the Lieutenant Governor that Christie, as a magistrate, was prejudiced against the Irish and favoured Scottish litigants. Later, he lodged a similar complaint against a magistrate of Irish background, Daniel O'Connor, accusing him of favouring Roman Catholic Irish over Irish Orangemen. O'Connor responded that none of Johnston's own friends were immune from his attacks. Some months after this exchange, Johnston's house was burnt down by unknown enemies.

For a short time in 1836, Johnston operated a newspaper, the Bytown Independent, and Farmer’s Advocate, which he used mainly as a platform to criticize a number of prominent political figures of the time, coming close to libel on some occasions. After a few issues he sold the press to Christie.

In 1837, Johnston suffered a number of attacks from organized Irish thugs known as Shiners. Ottawa at this time did not have a police force, and there was an ongoing conflict between the Shiners, composed of Irish labourers, and French-Canadian lumbermen. Johnston had complained to Lieutenant Governor Sir Francis Bond Head against the leader of the Shiners, Peter Aylen, because of Aylen's apparent immunity from the law. Aylen's men attacked him in his home and then attempted to kill him while he was returning home at night. These incidents helped establish the need for police services in the town.

In 1834 and 1836, Johnston stood for election to the Legislative Assembly of Upper Canada in the riding of Carleton, which encompassed Bytown and the surrounding county of Carleton, but was unsuccessful both times. In 1841, he stood for election to the Legislative Assembly of the Province of Canada for the new riding of Bytown but was persuaded by the Governor General, Lord Sydenham to withdraw his nomination in favour of Sydenham's preferred candidate, Stewart Derbishire. (Christie was another of the candidates persuaded to withdraw.) Johnston instead stood for election in the surrounding riding of Carleton, nominated by O'Connor, and was elected to the Assembly. He was reelected in 1844. Johnston helped promote the interests of his area and lobbied for the selection of Bytown as the provincial capital. Derbishire considered him one of the most effective members of the House in debate.

Although he originally considered himself a reformer, Johnston opposed responsible government, because he thought it threatened the independence of the members. He also opposed Lord Sydenham's policy of seeking a broad base of support in the Legislative Assembly, earning a reputation as a Family Compact Tory. Johnston also voted against a bill sponsored by Robert Baldwin to end secret societies, which Johnston believed was aimed at the Orange Lodge. His opposition to the bill caused another break with O'Connor, a Catholic. In 1846, he resigned from the Assembly, stating that "the ingratitude and never-ceasing coercion of Ministers were too much for me." Nonetheless, he ran in the resulting by-election but was defeated.

Faced with allegations of drinking, he died in Bytown in 1849. He was survived by his wife, Jane, and left an estate of approximately £700. Although there was only short notice of his funeral, the report in the Packet, a journal which had opposed Johnston's politics, commented that it was the largest funeral ever seen at Bytown, "a sufficient evidence, if any were wanting, of the wide spread reputation he enjoyed."
