= Neil Stewart =

Neil Stewart may refer to:

- Neil Stewart (Canadian politician) (1793–1881), merchant and politician in Canada West
- Neil Stewart (British politician), president of the National Union of Students of the United Kingdom
