= Carleton (Province of Canada electoral district) =

Province of Canada electoral district

Carleton Canada West
Province of Canada electoral district

Defunct pre-Confederation electoral district
- Legislature: Legislative Assembly of the Province of Canada
- District created: 1841
- District abolished: 1867
- First contested: 1841
- Last contested: 1863

Carleton was an electoral district of the Legislative Assembly of the Parliament of the Province of Canada, in Canada West. It was based on Carleton County, fronting on the Ottawa River.

Carleton electoral district was created in 1841, upon the establishment of the Province of Canada by the merger of Upper Canada and Lower Canada. It was represented by one member in the Legislative Assembly. It was abolished in 1867, upon the creation of Canada and the province of Ontario.

== Boundaries ==
Carleton electoral district was located in eastern Canada West (now the province of Ontario), on the Ottawa River, which formed the boundary with Canada East (now the province of Quebec). It was based on the boundaries of Carleton County. The electoral district surrounded Bytown, the county seat, but Bytown was not part of Carleton electoral district, being represented by its own electoral district.

The Union Act, 1840 had merged the two provinces of Upper Canada and Lower Canada into the Province of Canada, with a single Parliament. The separate parliaments of Lower Canada and Upper Canada were abolished. The Union Act provided that the pre-existing electoral boundaries of Upper Canada would continue to be used in the new Parliament, unless altered by the Union Act itself.

Carleton County had been an electoral district in the Legislative Assembly of Upper Canada and was continued with the same boundaries. The boundaries for Carleton had been set by a statute of Upper Canada in 1838:

That the said Townships of Gloucester, Nepean, Osgoode, North Gower, March, Torbolton, Fitzroy, Huntly, Goulbourn and Marlborough, together with the Islands lying wholly or in greater part opposite thereto, do constitute and form the County of Carleton ...

The only change from those boundaries was that the county seat, Bytown, was no longer included in Carleton. The Union Act provided that Bytown was its own electoral district in the new Parliament. The boundaries of Bytown electoral district were defined by the Governor General, and any parts of the town which were not included in Bytown electoral district were included in Carleton.

In the run-up to the first general election, in 1841, the Governor General, Lord Sydenham, took personal credit for the creation of Bytown as a separate electoral district from Carleton.

== Members of the Legislative Assembly ==
Carleton was represented by one member in the Legislative Assembly. The following were the members for Carleton.

Parliament	Years	Member	Party
1st Parliament; 1841–1844	1841–1844	James Johnston	Unionist; Compact Tory
2nd Parliament; 1844–1847	1844–1846	James Johnston	Reformer
2nd Parliament; 1844–1847	1846–1847	George Lyon	Conservative
3rd Parliament; 1848–1851	1848–1851	Edward Malloch	Conservative
4th Parliament; 1852–1854	1852–1854	Edward Malloch	Conservative
5th Parliament; 1854–1857	1854–1857	William Frederick Powell	Conservative
6th Parliament; 1858–1861	1858–1861	William Frederick Powell	Conservative
7th Parliament; 1861–1863	1861–1863	William Frederick Powell	Conservative
8th Parliament; 1863–1866	1863–1866	William Frederick Powell	Conservative

== Abolition ==
The district was abolished on July 1, 1867, when the British North America Act, 1867 came into force, creating Canada and splitting the Province of Canada into Quebec and Ontario. It was succeeded by electoral districts of the same name in the House of Commons of Canada and the Legislative Assembly of Ontario.
