= Andrew Robertson (businessman) =

Scottish dry goods merchant (1827–1890)

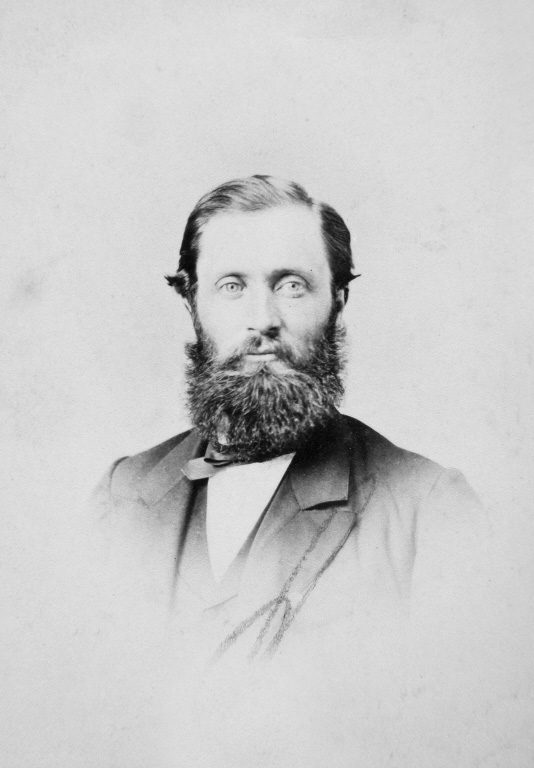
- Born: 18 June 1827; Paisley, Scotland
- Died: 29 March 1890 (aged 62); Montreal, Quebec

Andrew Robertson (18 June 1827 – 29 March 1890) was a successful Scottish dry goods merchant in Montreal. He was best known as Chairman of the Montreal Harbour Commission. He purchased and donated the land on which the Erskine Presbyterian Church was built, and was president and Governor of the Montreal General Hospital. He was the first President of the Bell Telephone Company of Canada and the Commercial Travellers' Association of Canada. He was also President of the Montreal Board of Trade, the Dominion Board of Trade and the Royal Canadian Insurance Company.

== Early life in Scotland ==
Robertson was born 18 June 1827, in Paisley, the son of Alexander Robertson and Grant Stuart Macdonald (1805–1828), daughter of Robert MacDonald (1778–1840) and Grant Stewart (1777–1854) of Perth, Perthshire. She died 13 September 1827 in Paisley. Andrew was a first cousin of James Robertson (1831–1914) who founded Robertson's Marmalade in 1864.

Andrew received a classical education at the Paisley Grammar School, and then was instructed in the practical trade of weaving. In 1840, he moved to Glasgow and worked for the next four years in a dry goods store. At the same time he took a position in a manufacturing company and proving a success he was made a partner in 1848. In 1850 at Glasgow, he married Agnes Bow, but following medical advice, he immigrated with his young family to Montreal in 1853.

== Business in Montreal ==
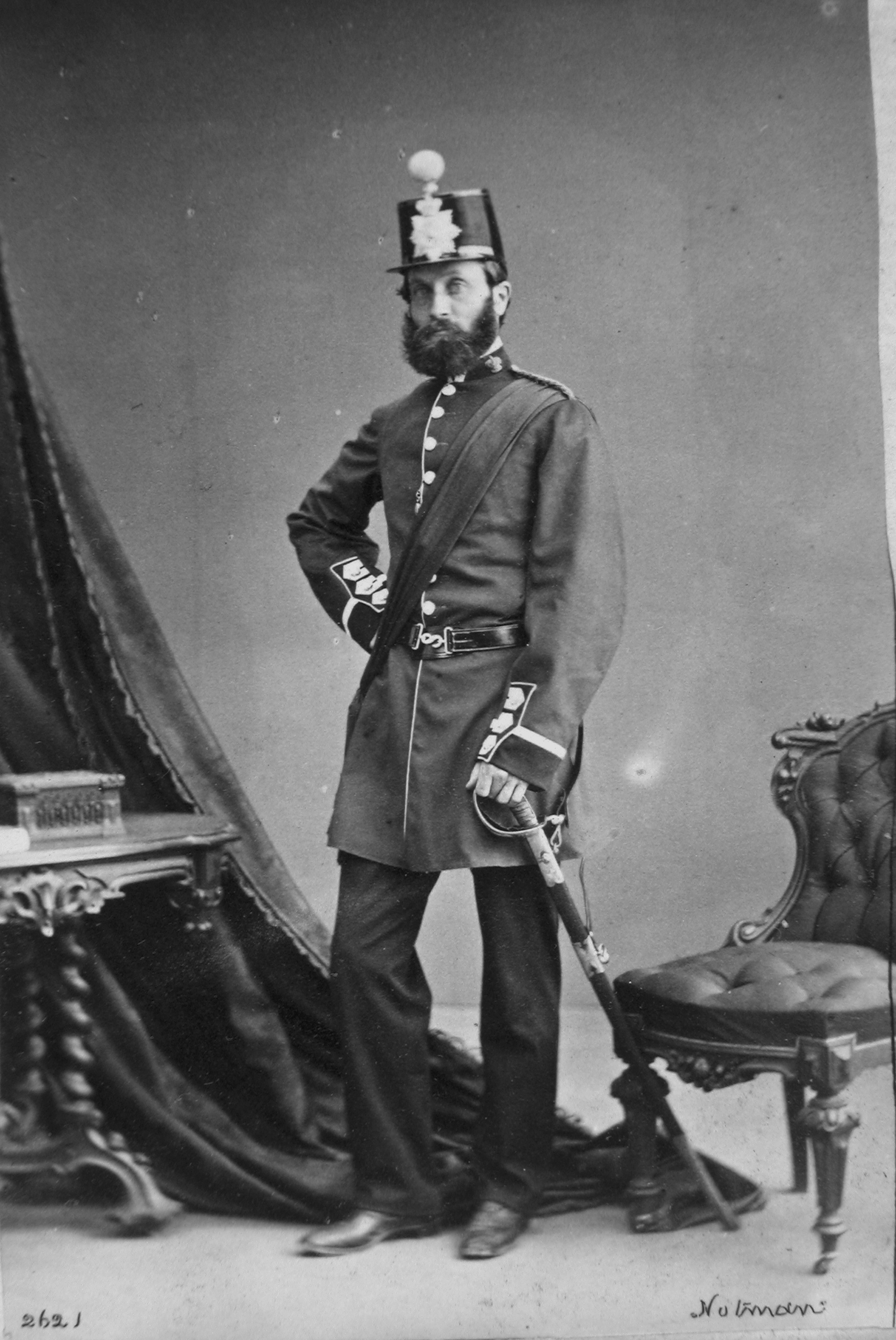
Taken in William Notman's studio in 1862.

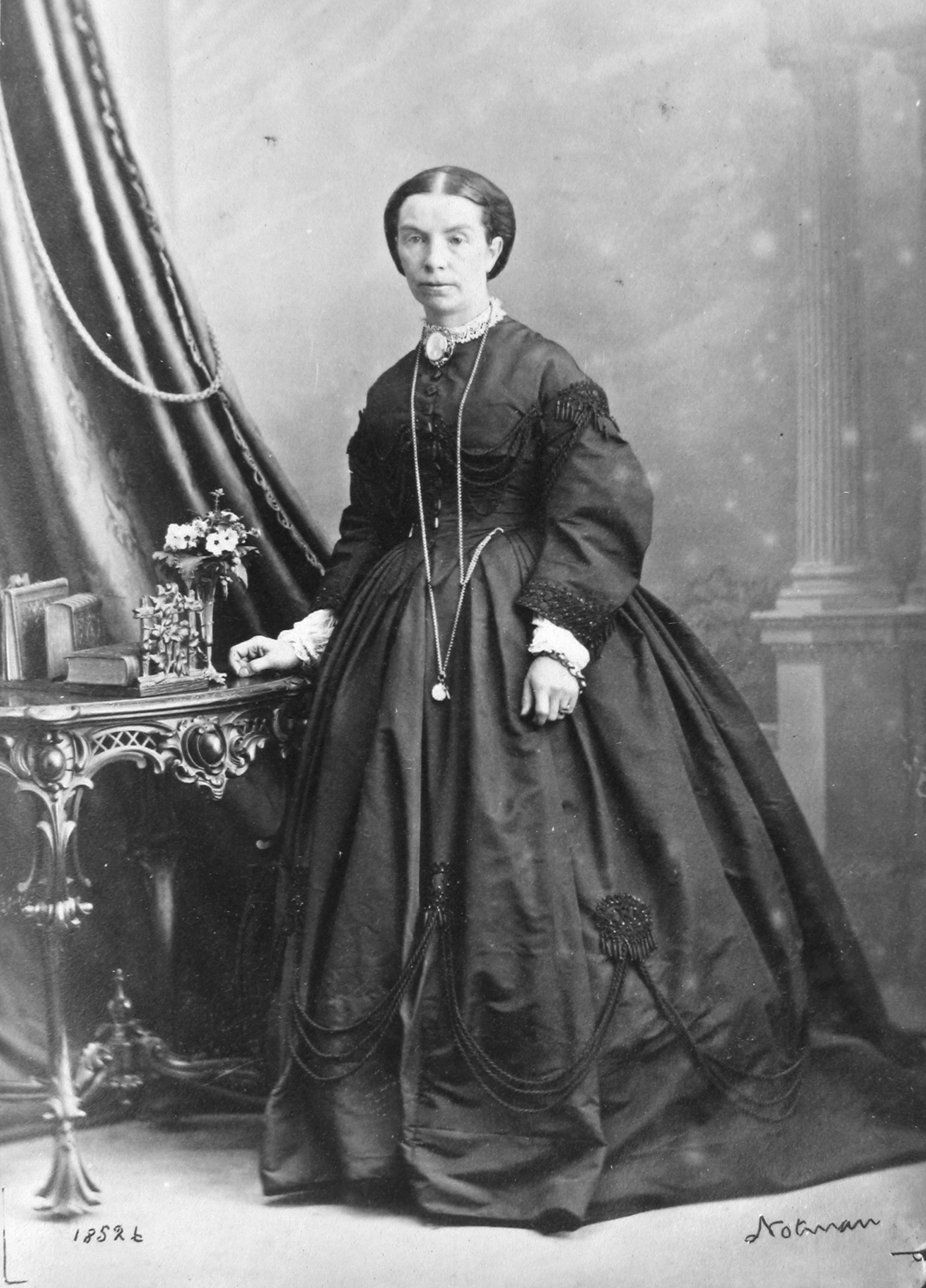
Agnes Bow taken by William Notman in 1865.

Arriving in Montreal in 1853, Robertson continued in the dry goods business working for the firm of Brown & Swan until 1855. Afterwards, he established Andrew Robertson & Company, specializing in yard goods. In the early 1860s, he built the Auburn Woolen Mill at Peterborough, Canada West, where he manufactured Canadian tweed.

In 1869, Andrew Robertson took part in a major meeting of the Montreal Board of Trade concerning the proposed construction of the Royal Albert Bridge across the St. Lawrence River. The meeting, attended by more than a hundred merchants and business leaders, debated whether the bridge would benefit railway development and commerce or obstruct navigation in the port of Montreal. Robertson sided with Hugh McLennan and other prominent figures in supporting an amendment that opposed the bridge as planned, on the grounds that it would seriously hinder shipping. The resolution to withhold approval of the bridge was ultimately adopted unanimously.

In 1867, Robertson sold the Auburn Woolen Mill in order to buy the future Lord Mount Stephen's wholesale dry goods business in Montreal. Stephen's youngest brother, Francis, joined Robertson in the firm of Robertson, Stephen & Company, and in 1874 Robert Linton also became a partner. Robertson retired from business in 1885, and at his death left an estate of between $350,000 and $400,000. The year after his death, Linton acquired the interest held in the firm by Robertson's heirs.

== Public life in Montreal ==
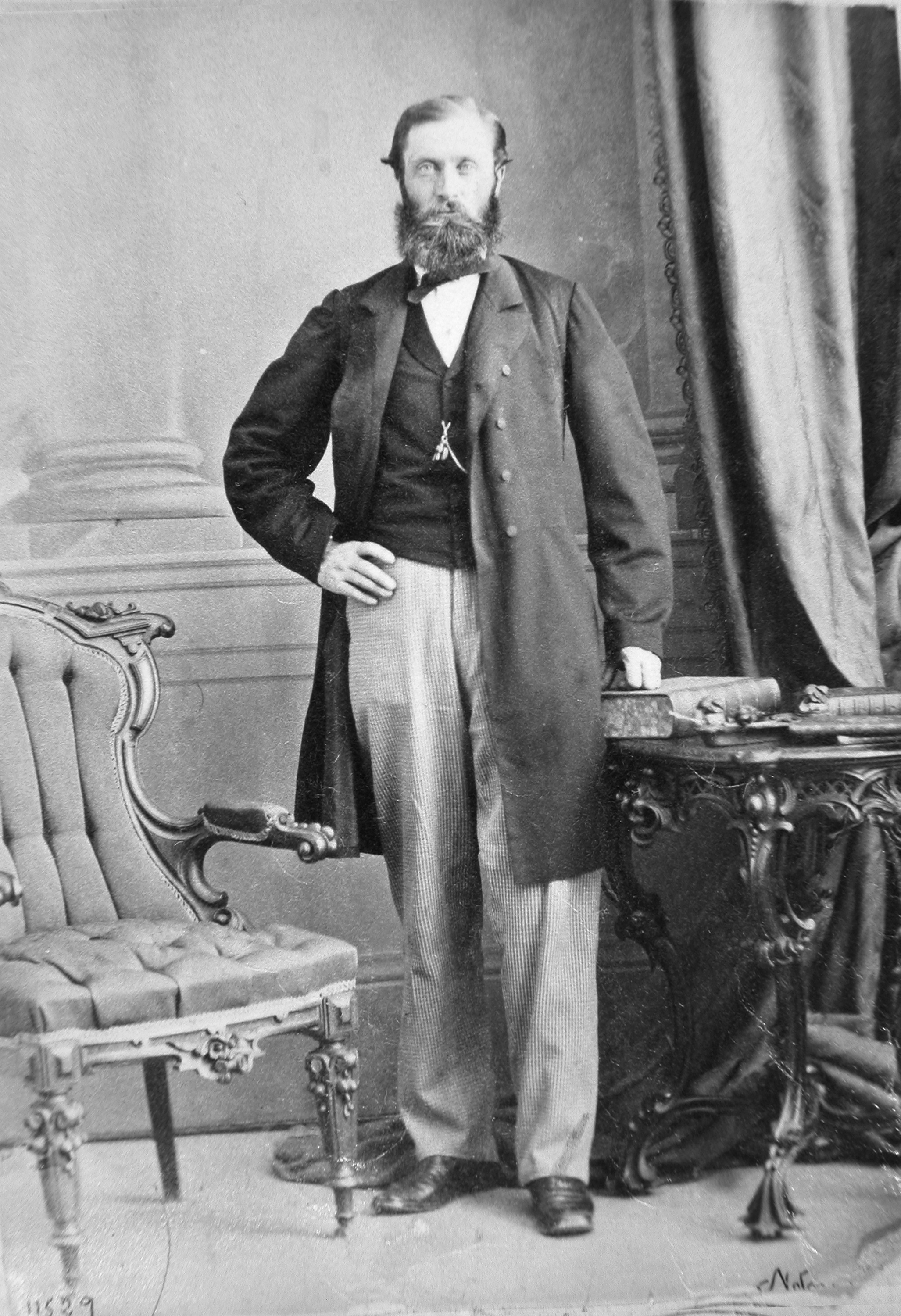
Andrew Robertson taken in 1864 by William Notman.

Early in his Montreal days, he purchased and donated the land on which Erskine Presbyterian Church was built. He served twice as president of the St. Andrew's Society in the 1860s, and belonged to the St James Club. During the American Civil War he joined the Canadian militia as Lieutenant and quartermaster of the Montreal Light Infantry. He was appointed Justice of the Peace in 1884. In 1872, he became a governor of the Montreal General Hospital, and later served as its treasurer, vice-president, and president. On his death he left $5,000 to the hospital. Robertson was also president of the Montreal Board of Trade in 1876 and 1877, and of the Dominion Board of Trade in 1876. He was the first president in 1874 of the Commercial Travellers' Association of Canada, president of the Royal Canadian Insurance Company from 1876 to 1890, and president of the Bell Telephone Company of Canada from its establishment in 1880 until his death.

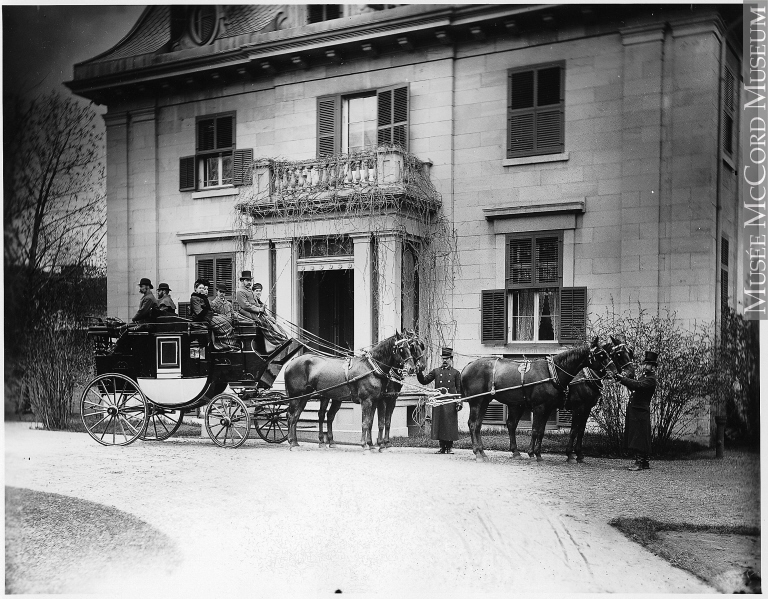
Robertson's house off Dorchester Street in the Golden Square Mile, Montreal

He was closely associated with Andrew Allan and Alexander Walker Ogilvie in forming the Citizens' Gas Company which in the early 1880s attempted unsuccessfully to challenge the domination of the Montreal Gas Company. In 1881, he journeyed to British Columbia with Sir Charles Tupper, who described Robertson as a "merchant prince," in order to report on the feasibility of the Canadian Pacific Railway building a line between Victoria and Nanaimo. Although Robertson recommended such a move, the CPR did not undertake the construction.

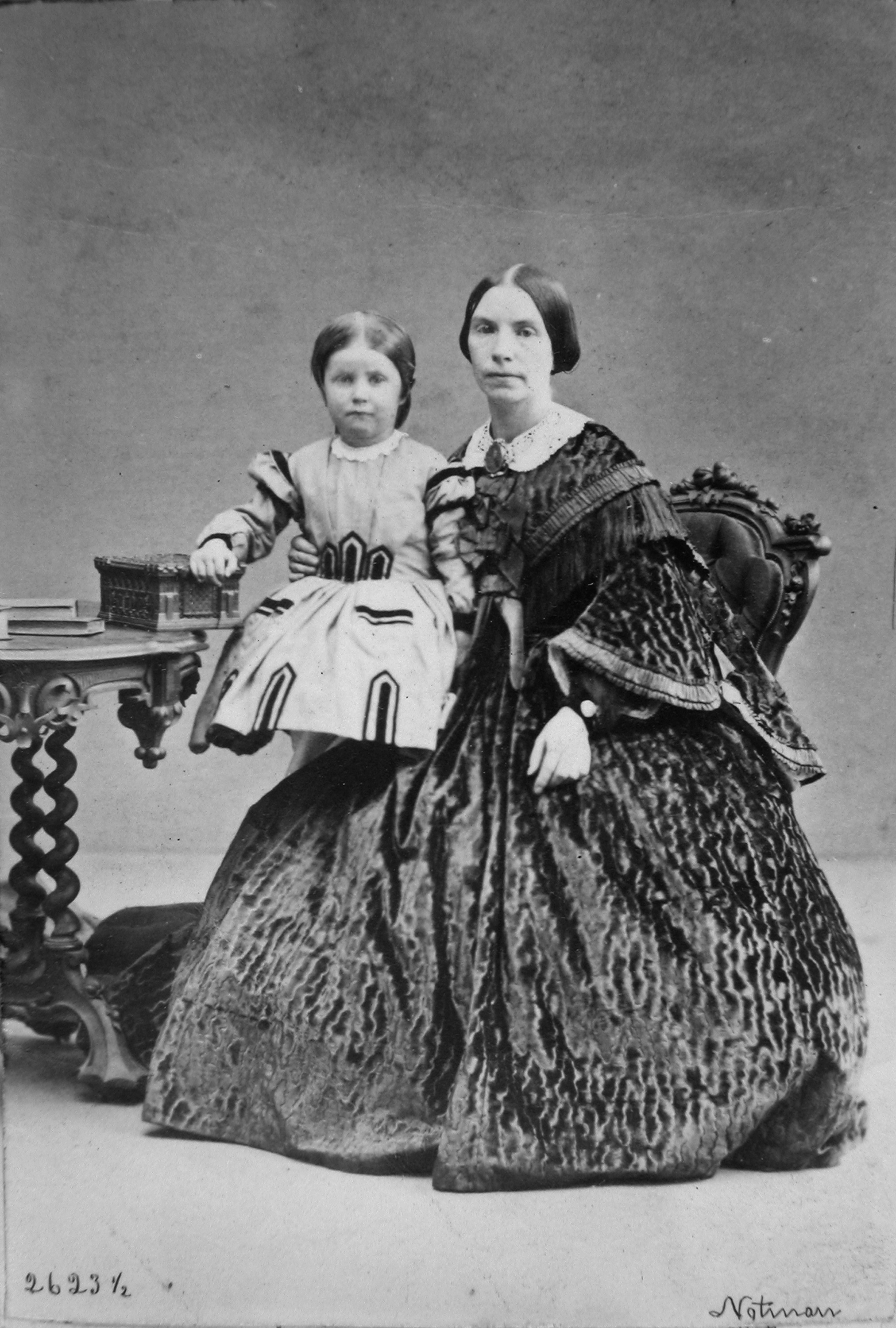
Agnes Bow and baby, Montreal, QC, 1862. Take in William Notman's studio.

Andrew also became active in politics and a bi-product of his Tory affiliations was an appointment to the Montreal Harbour Commission by Sir John A. Macdonald in 1878. He soon was made chairman and held this position until his death. While he had many major achievements in business and in the community, Andrew Robertson's most notable achievement was with the harbour commission. He dealt with a large deficit that he had inherited and undertook improvements to the harbour that kept it competitive in the shipping industry.

== Family ==
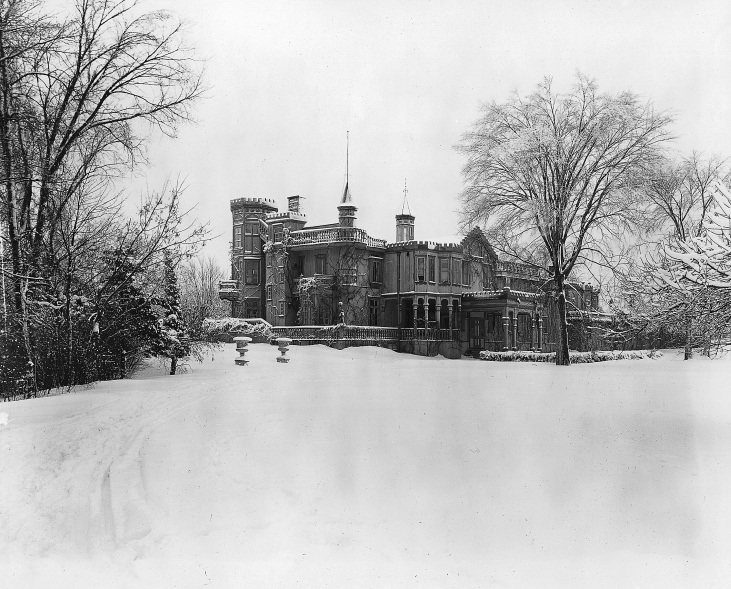
The Island, home of Hugh and Bella (Robertson) Paton at L'Abord-à-Plouffe, near Montreal

In 1850, Robertson had married his wife Agnes Bow in Glasgow, the daughter of merchant Alexander Bow of Glasgow. In 1853, they emigrated to Montreal with their two eldest children. Their remaining eight children were all born in Montreal. The family lived at 'Elmbank' off Dorchester Street in the Golden Square Mile. Two children died young, and of the eight who survived they included,

- Captain Alexander Robertson (1851–1928) J.P., married Laura Ellen Bond, daughter of the Rt. Rev. William Bennett Bond, Bishop of Montreal and 2nd Primate of the Anglican Church of Canada
- Mary Robertson, married James Stewart Tupper, son of Sir Charles Tupper, 6th Prime Minister of Canada
- Isabella Robertson, known as Bella, married in 1884 Hugh Paton (1852–1941) of Montreal and "The Island" at L'Abord-à-Plouffe.
- Margaret Eliza Robertson, married James Alexander Strathy (1857–1901), son of James Breckinridge Strathy and Elvira Lee. They were the parents of seven children.
- John Bow Robertson, of Montreal

== See also ==
- History of Montreal
- Lower Canada
- Golden Square Mile
- Scots-Quebecers
