= William Taylor Stores =

Historic building in Georgia

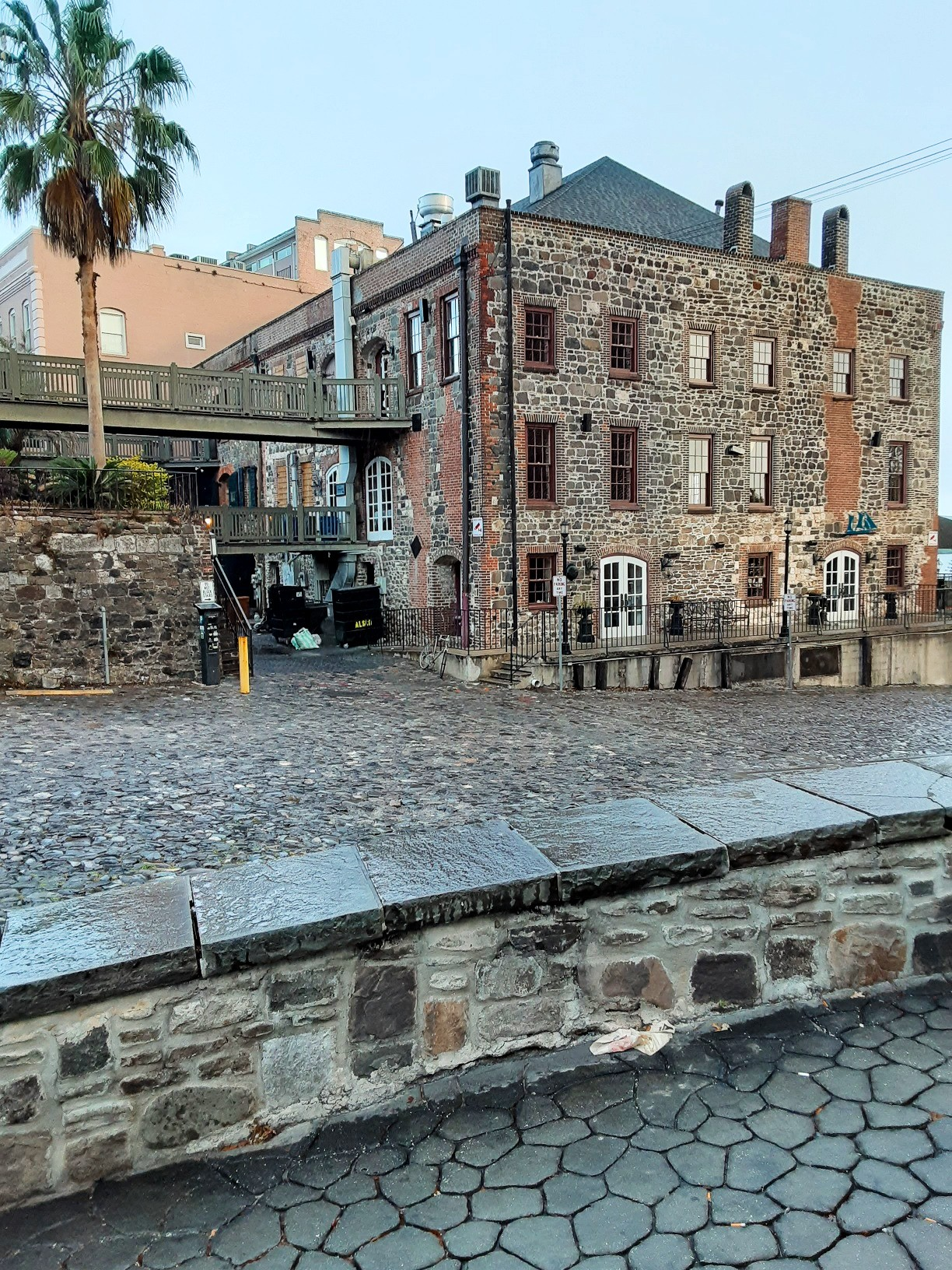
- The building in 2022, viewed from the Barnard Street ramp
- Interactive map of the William Taylor Stores area

General information
- Location: 202–206 West Bay Street, Savannah, Georgia, United States
- Coordinates: 32.0822°N 81.0934°W
- Completed: 1806 (220 years ago) (202–204; eastern section); 1818 (208 years ago) (western section; 206)

Technical details
- Floor count: 3–4

William Taylor Stores is a historic building in Savannah, Georgia, United States. Located in Savannah's Historic District, the addresses of some of the properties are West Bay Street, above Factors Walk, while others solely utilize the former King Cotton warehouses on River Street. As of February 2022, these are the Chart House Seafood in the eastern section (completed in 1806), while Modern Travel Network and American Gift Shop occupy the western section (completed in 1818). It is the oldest surviving structure on today's River Street, the oldest ballast-stone cotton warehouse in the country, and stated by the Historic American Buildings Survey (HABS) as being significant as an "early example of a multi-storied river embankment storage warehouse".

The eastern section, today's 202 and 204, was formerly Southern Marine Supply Company Incorporated, while the western section, now 206, was known as the Taylor House at the time of its construction.

The buildings were partially destroyed by fire in 1885 and rebuilt the same year.

== William Taylor ==
William Taylor (1769–1840), a merchant and slave owner, was a Scottish emigrant who initially moved to South Carolina. He married Mary Elizabeth Clayton Miller in Stateburg, South Carolina, in 1799. Taylor was a partner with both his brother-in-law and Andrew Low for a period. He was president of the Saint Andrew's Society, an organization that assisted Scottish immigrants to the United States. Upon Taylor's death in 1840, one of the executors of his will was William Washington, the father of Girl Scouts founder Juliette Gordon Low.

The Taylors had several children, although only two survived: Alexander Miller Taylor (1800–1829) and Elizabeth Ann Taylor Goodwin (1802–1882). Elizabeth survived her husband by six years (died in 1846).

== Interior views ==
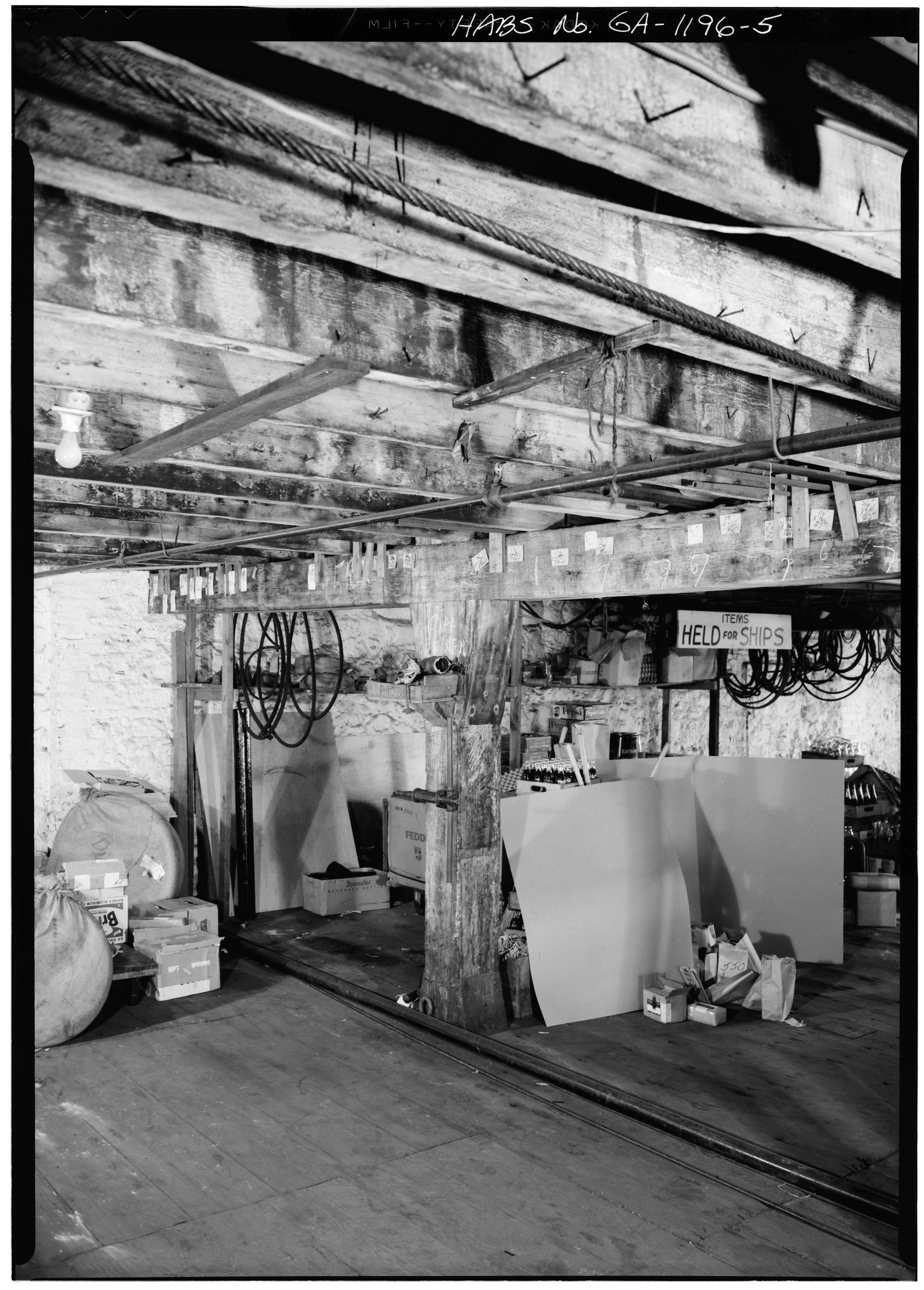
The inside of one of the first-floor stores

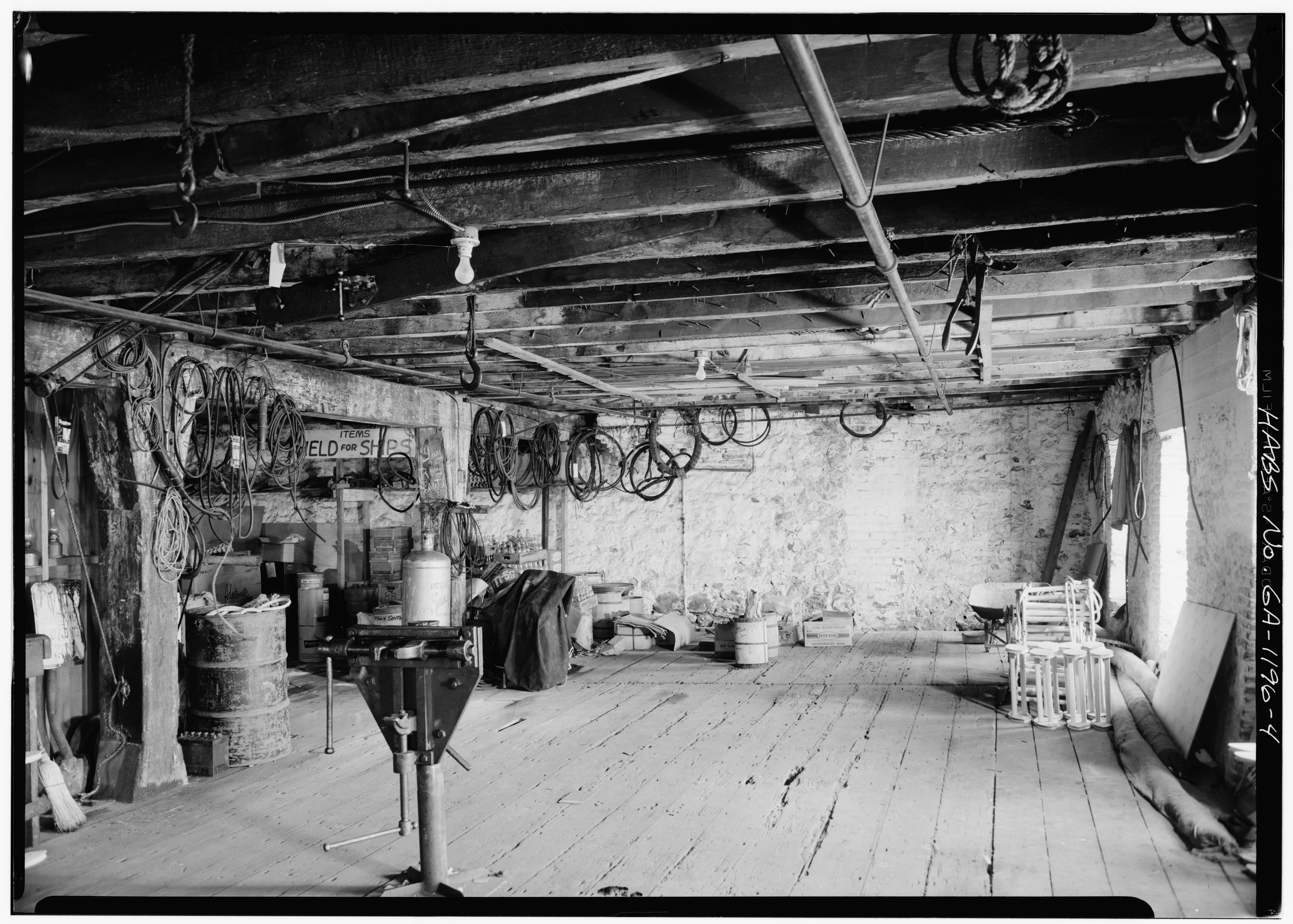

== River Street façade ==
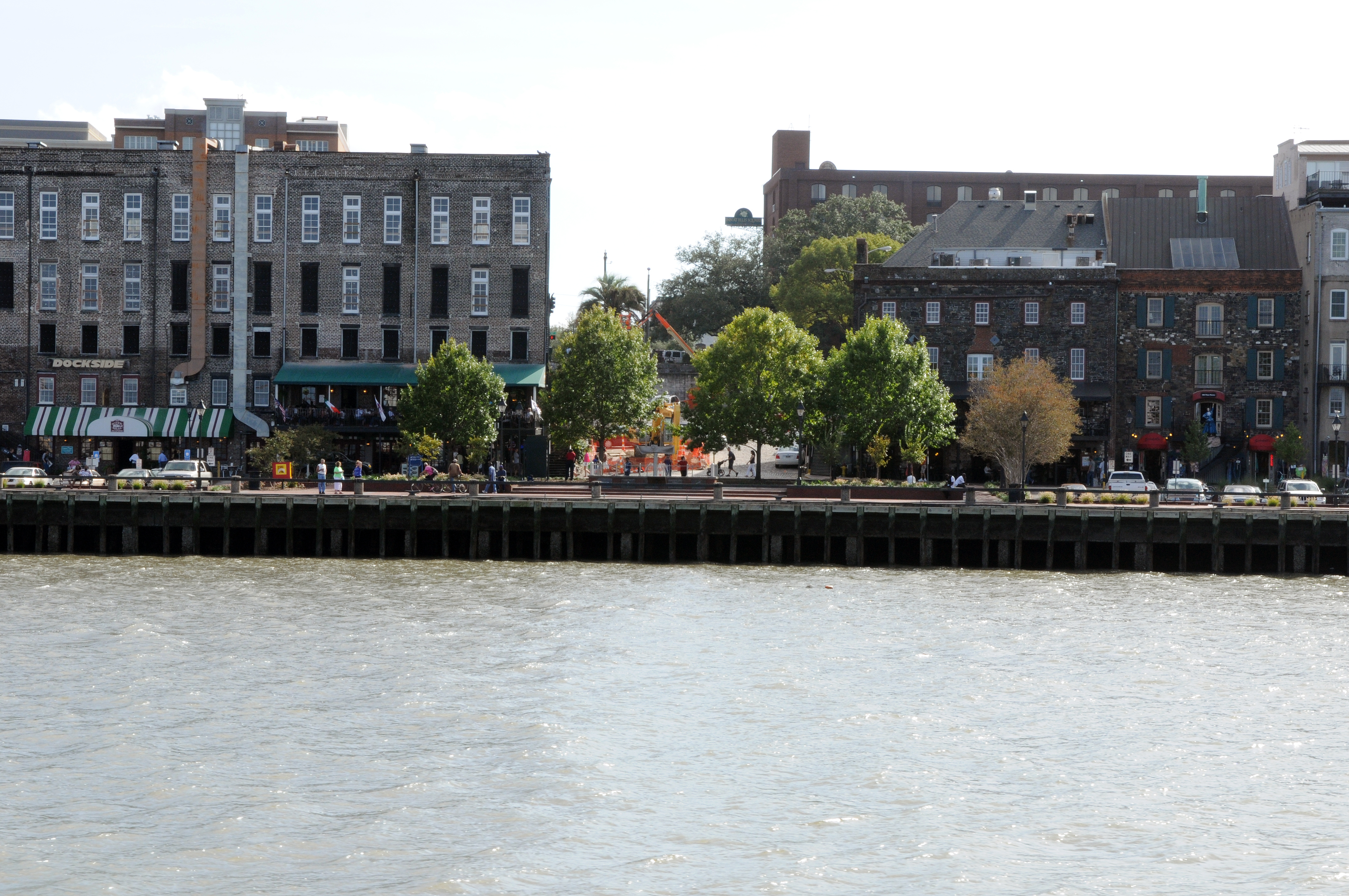
From the Savannah River. The Jones and Telfair Range is on the left

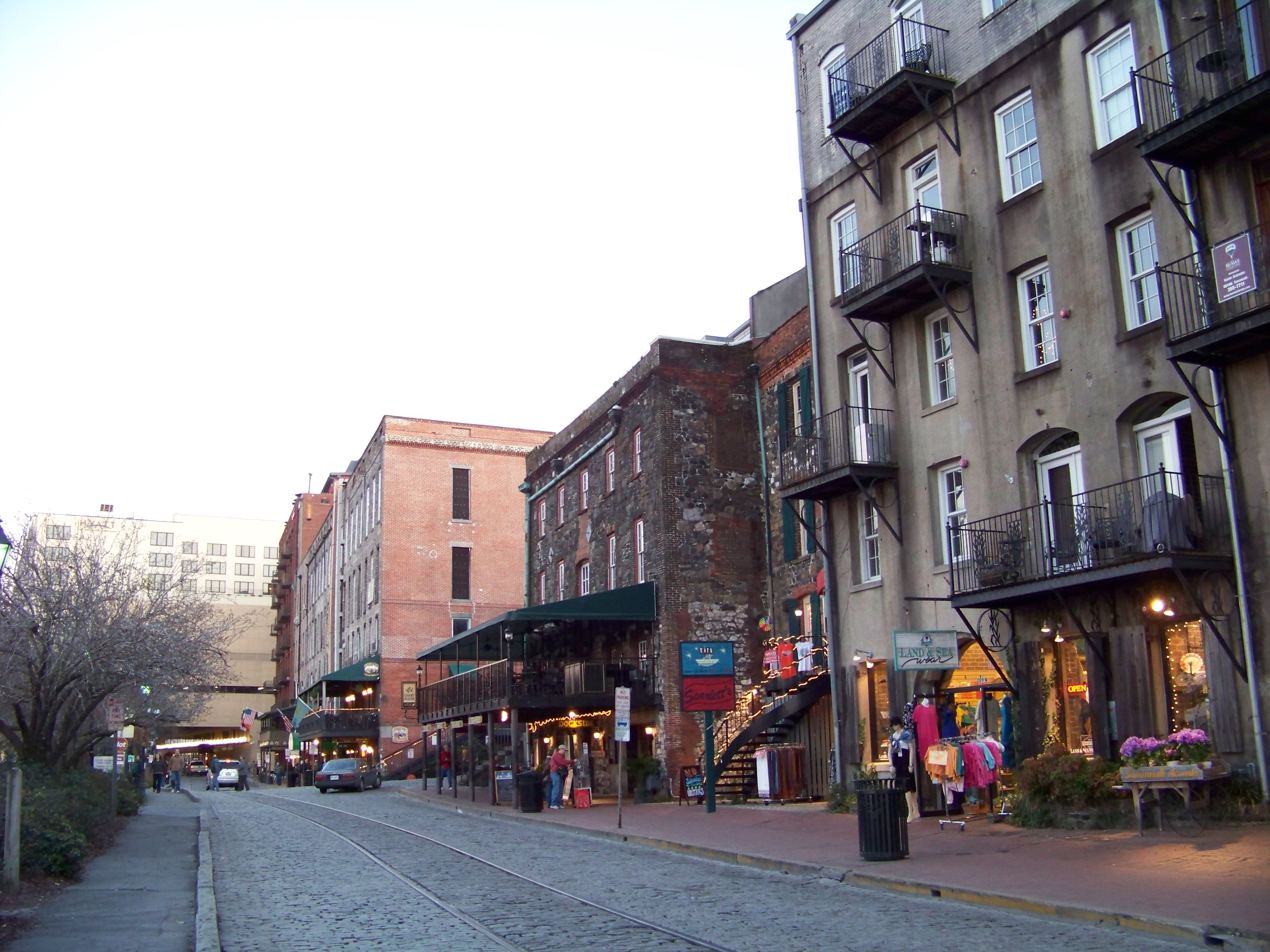
The River Street façade (center), with the Lowden Building closest to the camera

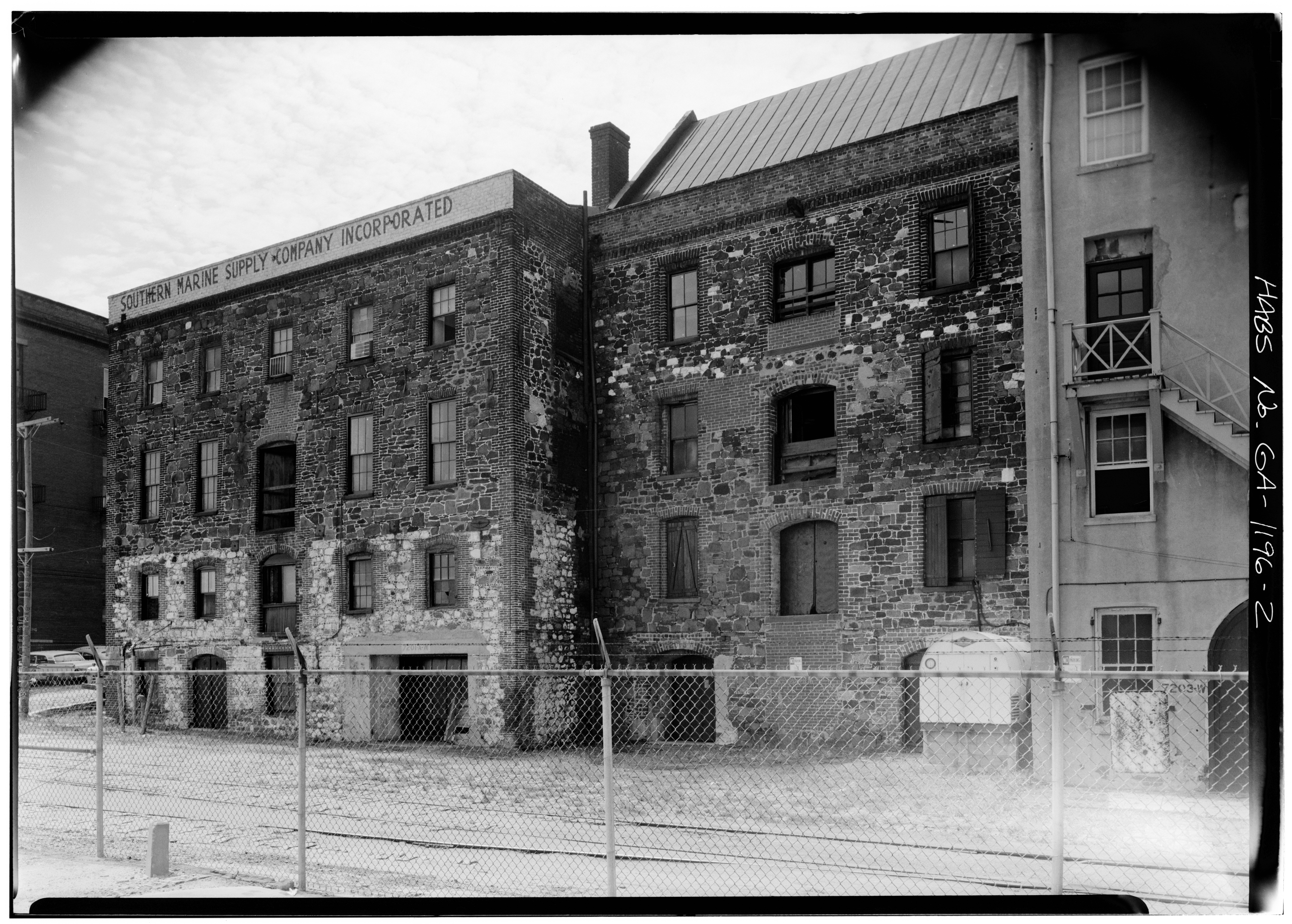
A 1930s view

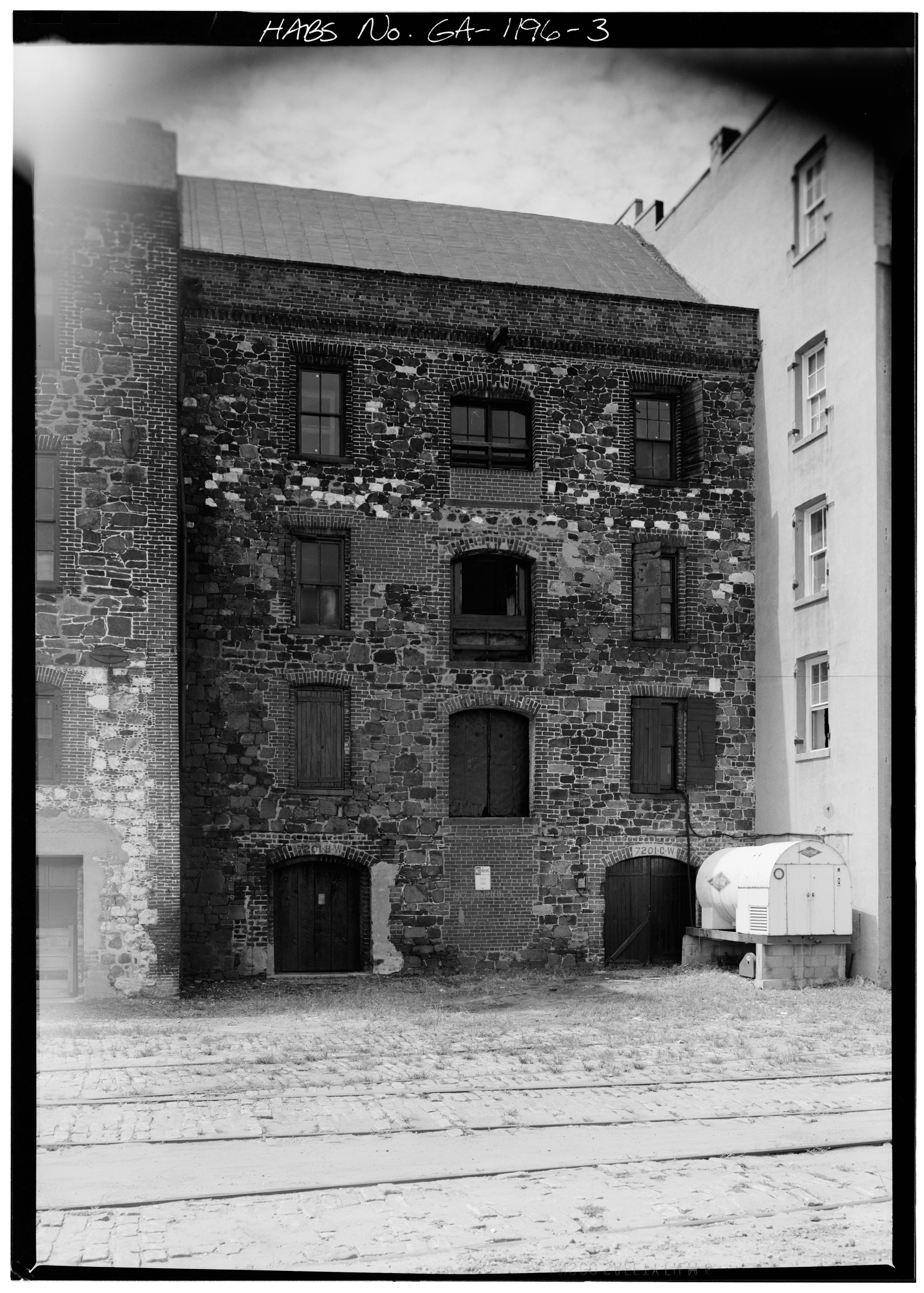
Detail of the former Taylor House

== Barnard Street elevation ==
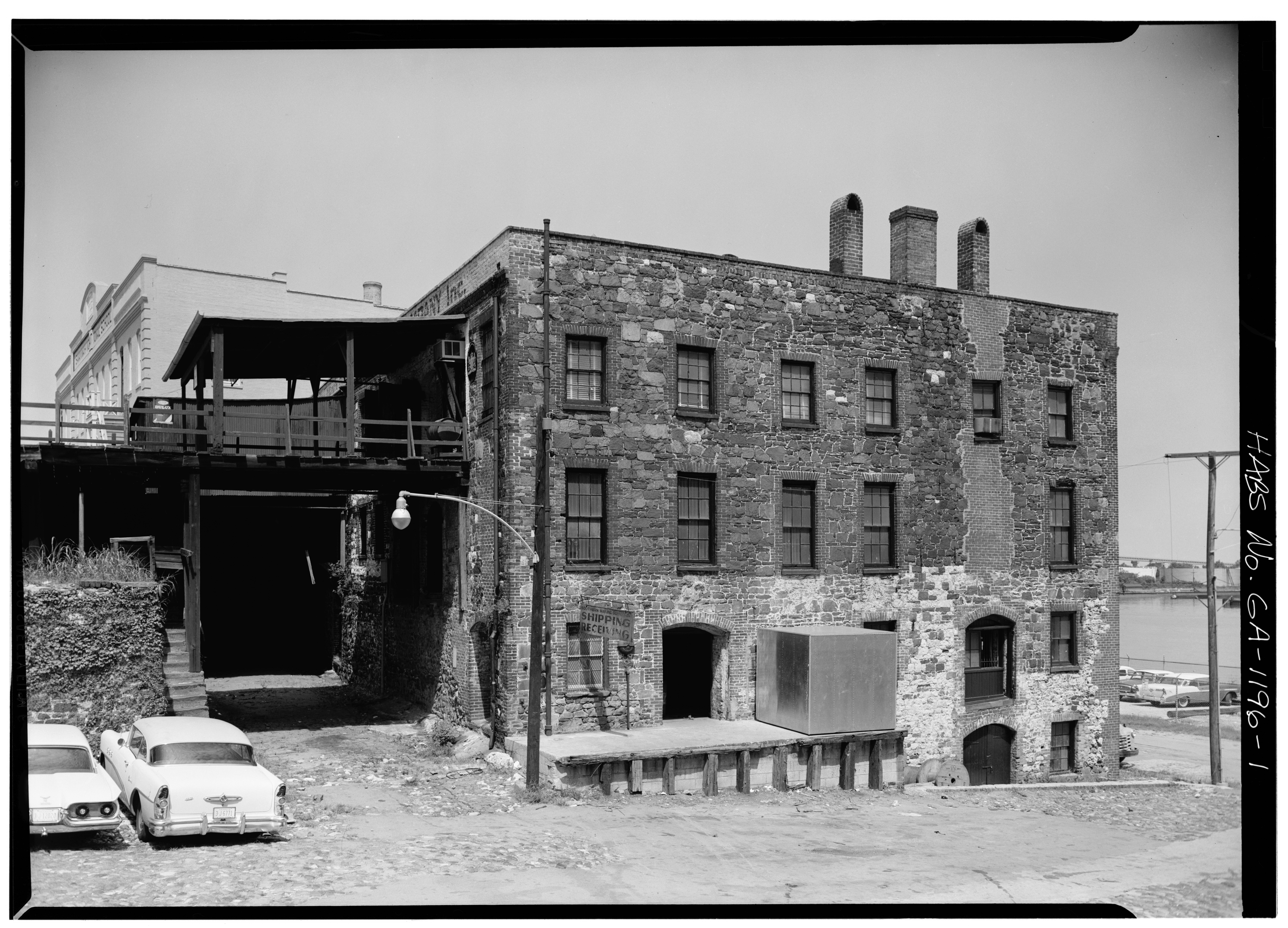
The building's eastern elevation in the 1930s

== See also ==
- Buildings in Savannah Historic District
