= William Stewart (Canada West) =

Province of Canada businessman and politician

Member of the Legislative Assembly of the Province of Canada for Russell
- In office 1843–1844
- Preceded by: William Henry Draper
- Succeeded by: Archibald Petrie

Member of the Legislative Assembly of the Province of Canada for Bytown
- In office 1844–1847
- Preceded by: Stewart Derbishire
- Succeeded by: John Scott

Personal details
- Born: July 24, 1803 Carbost, Loch Harport, Isle of Skye, Scotland
- Died: March 21, 1856 (aged 52) Toronto, Canada West
- Party: Moderate Tory
- Spouse: Catherine Stewart
- Children: Nine; five daughters and four sons, including McLeod Stewart
- Occupation: Landowner, lumber trade, farmer

William Stewart (July 24, 1803 – March 21, 1856) was a businessman and political figure in Upper Canada and Canada West. An immigrant from Scotland, he settled in Bytown (now Ottawa) where he was active in business and public life. He was elected to the Legislative Assembly of the Province of Canada, serving from 1843 to 1847. He died in Toronto in 1856, while representing the interests of the city of Ottawa.

== Early life and family ==
Stewart was born in Carbost, Loch Harport on the Isle of Skye, Scotland in 1803 to Ranald Stewart and Isabella McLeod. After his father's death in 1816, Stewart and his family, consisting of his recently widowed mother, grandmother, uncle, and nine siblings, emigrated to Upper Canada. Landing in Quebec City, Lower Canada, they settled in Glengarry County, Upper Canada, an area with a large Scottish population.

In 1838, Stewart returned to Skye to marry Catherine Stewart, his first cousin once removed. They married at Cuidrach on the Isle of Skye, and honeymooned in London. They had five daughters and four sons.

Stewart was fluent in both English and Scots Gaelic, and acquired a working knowledge of French.

== Bytown businessman ==
As a young man, Stewart began working for a merchant in Montreal and gained experience in the lumber trade. By 1827, he moved to Bytown, later Ottawa, where he opened a store and a tavern, although he himself was a teetotaller. During the 1830s, he was part of the Ottawa River timber trade and was a founding member of the Ottawa Lumber Association. He sold land in the Sandy Hill area of the town on behalf of Louis-Théodore Besserer. Stewart also operated a large farm along the Rideau River.

In 1835, while in London, Stewart presented submissions to the British government on behalf of Bytown residents and Montreal merchants, arguing for the need for navigational improvements to the Ottawa River. Three years later, in 1838, he gave testimony in the British Parliament about the feasibility of a water route linking Lake Huron to the Ottawa River. The next year, he made similar submissions to the Governor General, Lord Durham.

Although initially prosperous, Stewart suffered financial losses in the mid-1840s as a result of a glut in timber and drop in prices. He eventually left the timber trade and concentrated on his extensive farm operations, as well as acquiring considerable landholdings in Bytown, and in the neighbouring counties of Carleton and Renfrew.

== Community activity ==
Stewart was very active in his community, both in business matters and community service. On the business side, he was a member of the Bytown board of trade and a director for the Bank of British North America.

Stewart was elected to the first town council in 1828. He helped found the Carleton General Protestant Hospital, which became the Ottawa Civic Hospital, and also Wallis House. He was a founding member of St. Andrew's Presbyterian Church; a vice-president of the Highland Society of Canada; director of the Bytown Emigration Society; and president of the Agricultural Society of Carleton County.

During the time of the Shiners' War, a conflict between French-Canadian and Irish lumbermen, he helped form the Association for the Preservation of the Peace. He was also active in the local militia.

== Political career ==
In 1841, Stewart stood for election to represent Bytown in the first Parliament of the Province of Canada. However, he was unsuccessful, being defeated by Stewart Derbishire, the preferred candidate of the Governor General, Lord Sydenham. Stewart was the first to declare his candidacy, in a public address to the electors in August 1840. Three other candidates followed, also announcing their intention to stand for election, but the situation changed in late September, when Sydenham paid a short visit to Bytown. He persuaded the three other declared candidates to withdraw, in favour of Derbishire, a parachute candidate from Montreal who had never set foot in Bytown.

Stewart refused to withdraw. In the election, held on March 8 and 9, 1841, Derbishire carried the poll, by a vote of 52 to 29. Stewart immediately issued two public protests, accusing the returning officer of partisanship in favour of Derbishire, but did not contest the outcome further. He did not carry a grudge against Derbishire, and worked with him on local issues.

Stewart continued to have political interests, and two years later an opportunity appeared. William Draper was the sitting member for Russell, a rural riding east of Bytown. In 1843, Draper accepted an appointment to the Legislative Council, the upper house of the provincial parliament, vacating his seat in the Assembly. Stewart contested the resulting by-election, and at one point was escorted to Russell by a brigade of uniformed volunteer firemen from Bytown. He was elected to replace Draper.

The next year, 1844, there was a general election for Parliament. Derbishire did not stand for re-election, having accepted a position as Queen's Printer for the Province. Stewart ran in the Bytown seat and was elected. He represented Bytown in Parliament from 1844 to 1847.

In the Assembly, Stewart showed himself to be a moderate Tory, generally voting in support of the positions of the Governor General. He proposed a canal linking the Ottawa River to Georgian Bay and drafted the bill incorporating Bytown. He was criticised for drawing the town boundaries to exclude his own farming property, making it subject to lower tax rates. He defended the boundaries on the basis that he was following the boundaries drawn by Lord Sydenham for the electoral district of Bytown.

Stewart stood for re-election in the general election of 1848 but was defeated. He tried again in the elections of 1851 and 1854, but was defeated each time. In the 1851 election, he was affiliated with the British American League, a group of Conservatives and Tories who favoured the British connection and the unification of all of British America.

== Death ==
Stewart became ill and died in Toronto in 1856 while acting as an agent for the city of Ottawa in dealings with the provincial government. His close political associate, Robert Bell, was with him at his bedside before his death. John Sandfield Macdonald, the member for Glengarry, was also present at his deathbed, and drew up his will.

== Legacy ==
His son, McLeod Stewart, was mayor of Ottawa from 1887 to 1888. His brother Neil also served in the assembly for the Province of Canada.

Stewart owned considerable land in the area now known as Ottawa's Centretown. The Victoria Memorial Museum Building is located on the land that made up Stewart's farm. Several streets in the area were named for members of his family: Catherine Street for his wife, McLeod Street for his son, Flora Street, Isabella Street, and Florence Street for his daughters.
