= Highland Society of Edinburgh =

Highland Society of Edinburgh may refer to:

- Edinburgh University Highland Society
- Royal Highland and Agricultural Society of Scotland
