= Stewart Derbishire =

Province of Canada politician

Member of the Legislative Assembly of the Province of Canada for Bytown
- In office 1841–1844
- Preceded by: New position
- Succeeded by: William Stewart

Queen's Printer for Province of Canada
- In office 1841–1863

Personal details
- Born: 1794 or 1795 London
- Died: March 27, 1863 Quebec City, Canada East
- Party: Whig (Britain); Moderate Reformer (Canada)
- Occupation: Lawyer, journalist, publisher

Stewart Derbishire (1794 or 1795 – March 27, 1863) was the first elected representative for Bytown in the Legislative Assembly of the Province of Canada. Born in England, he was a strong Whig.

At various times he was an ensign in the British Army, a lawyer, a journalist, a soldier of the British Auxiliary Legion in the First Carlist War in Spain, an assistant to Lord Durham in his inquiry into affairs in British North America, and the Queen's Printer for the Province of Canada.

== Early life and Spanish Carlist War ==
Derbishire was born in England around 1794. After a brief military career, he studied law and was called to the bar in 1830. In 1832, he was defence counsel to a group of labourers from Dorchester accused of machine-smashing, which earned him some popular recognition.

He later worked for a time as a journalist. Sent to Spain to cover the First Carlist War in 1837 for the Whig Morning Chronicle, he joined the fighting with the British Auxiliary Legion and was decorated by the Queen of Spain.

== Assistant to Lord Durham ==
Returning to England in 1837, he began to publish a newspaper but he learnt of the mission given to Lord Durham to investigate the causes of the 1837 rebellions in Lower Canada and Upper Canada. Derbishire wrote a letter to Lord Durham, offering his services for the inquiry. Durham accepted his offer and sent him to New York in 1838 to gather information on the Rebellion of 1837. Derbishire's credentials as a strong Whig won him access to notable Canadian figures who had sought refuge in New York following the abortive rebellion. William Lyon Mackenzie, John Rolph, and Edmund Bailey O’Callaghan all granted him interviews in New York. When he went on to Montreal, he was able to speak with Denis-Benjamin Viger and numerous other Lower Canadians. His conclusion was that the habitants of Lower Canada had "no practical grievances" and that the rebellion had been triggered by "the malaria of political agitation".

Derbishire also acted as press agent for Durham, encouraging journalists to write favourable articles about Durham and his inquiry. His last action on Durham's behalf was to carry dispatches to New Brunswick and Nova Scotia in November, 1838, through the wilderness in winter, seeking troops to assist in response to a resurgence of unrest.

Durham left British North America at the end of 1838, but Derbishire remained. He continued to provide his views on the possibility of unrest to the colonial government, but was seen as alarmist. He also provided information to the British government on the Maine–New Brunswick border dispute.

== Political career ==
In 1840, Derbishire returned to Montreal as editor of the Morning Courier. He re-established connections with the colonial government and became a supporter of the new Governor-General of the Province of Canada, Lord Sydenham. Derbishire used his editorial position to support the government in the Morning Courier.

The first general election for the new Parliament was held in the spring of 1841. Lord Sydenham was actively involved, taking all possible steps to ensure that there would be majority support for the new union Province of Canada. He recruited candidates who would support the union, and Derbishire was one of those candidates. With Sydenham's influence, Derbishire stood for election in the town of Bytown, Canada West (now Ottawa, Ontario), even though he had never set foot in the town.

Four other individuals from Bytown had declared that they sought to be elected, starting with William Stewart, who announced his candidacy in August, 1840, followed by three others over the course of the next month. All were residents of the area. However, the situation changed at the end of September, when Sydenham paid a short visit to Bytown. He met privately with the other three candidates, who all announced the withdrawal of their candidacies shortly afterwards. Stewart and Derbishire were the only remaining candidates. When the election was held in March, 1841, Derbishire won the poll by a vote of 52 to 29. Stewart immediately issued two public protests, accusing the returning officer of partisanship in conducting the poll, but did not formally contest the results. As a result of this pressure from the Governor General, Derbishire was elected to the first Legislative Assembly of the Province of Canada for the Bytown riding.

One of the other candidates who withdrew from the Bytown election, James Johnston, instead ran in the neighbouring riding of Carleton and was elected. Derbishire later commented that Johnston was one of the most effective members of the House in debate.

In the first session of the Parliament, Derbishire was a consistent supporter of Lord Sydenham and generally voted with the moderate reformers. Following Sydenham's death, he continued as a moderate reformer and supported the new governor, but in the ministerial crisis of 1843 he broke with the governor and voted with the moderate reformers, supporting the principle of responsible government.

Derbishire did not stand for election in the general election of 1844, having been appointed Queen's Printer for the Province of Canada. However, in a letter to Robert Baldwin, the leader of the Reform campaign for responsible government in Canada West, he worried that the strong passions being raised over the issue would lead to a civil war.

== Queen's Printer ==
Although Derbishire was a consistent supporter of Sydenham, he was not considered a very effective member in the Legislative Assembly. In the fall of 1841, Sydenham appointed Derbishire as Queen's Printer, in a joint appointment with George-Paschal Desbarats. His appointment was published in the first edition of the Canada Gazette, on October 2, 1841. He held the position from 1841 until his death in 1863.

== Wolfe's sword ==
In 1849, a monument was being erected to General James Wolfe on the Plains of Abraham, to replace an older monument which could not be repaired. The monument was erected on the spot where General Wolfe was traditionally thought to have died. In the process, the workers came across an ornate sword buried in the ground. Although there was nothing directly linking it to Wolfe, the combination of the high quality of the sword, and its location, led to the belief that it was Wolfe's sword, left behind when his body was removed.

Derbishire eventually bought the sword, and in turn gave it to Major Alexander Roberts Dunn, VC, of Toronto, whose father, John Henry Dunn, had served with Derbishire in the Legislative Assembly. Major Dunn had assisted in raising a new regiment for the British Army in Canada in 1858, the 100th (Prince of Wales's Royal Canadian) Regiment of Foot. Derbishire gave the Wolfe sword to Major Dunn when he left with the regiment for Britain.

== Family and personal life ==
Derbishire was considered very generous to his friends and was often in financial straits, in part because of his generosity towards the poor and his strong hospitality for his friends. He was declared an outlaw in Britain in 1841 for failing to pay his debts. His appointment as Queen's Printer that year gave him a steady income, but his finances were still somewhat shaky.

Derbishire was married twice. His first wife was wealthy, but by 1841 they were estranged, and she never joined him in Canada. She died in 1842 and he subsequently re-married. He was happier in his second marriage. He had six children between his two wives.

Derbishire died in Quebec City on March 27, 1863. His funeral was well-attended.
