= EUHS =

EUHS may refer to:

- East Union High School
- Edinburgh University Highland Society
