= Electoral history of Samuel J. Randall =

List of elections featuring Samuel J. Randall as a candidate

The electoral history of Samuel J. Randall, member of the United States House of Representatives and Speaker of the House.

== United States House of Representatives ==
=== Congressional elections ===
Pennsylvania's 1st congressional district, 1862:
■ Samuel J. Randall (D) – 7,720 (55.17%)
■ Edward G. Webb (R) – 6,273 (44.83%)

Pennsylvania's 1st congressional district, 1864:
■ Samuel J. Randall (D) – 9,764 (55.78%)
■ John M. Butler (NU) – 7,742 (44.23%)

Pennsylvania's 1st congressional district, 1866:
■ Samuel J. Randall (D) – 12,192 (61.2%)
■ Charles Gibbons (R) – 7,728 (38.80%)

Pennsylvania's 1st congressional district, 1868:
■ Samuel J. Randall (D) – 14,745 (63.69%)
■ Benjamin L. Berry (R) – 8,408 (36.32%)

Pennsylvania's 1st congressional district, 1870:
■ Samuel J. Randall (D) – 10,853 (61.81%)
■ Benjamin Huckell (R) – 6,705 (38.19%)

Pennsylvania's 1st congressional district, 1872:
■ Samuel J. Randall (D) – 10,133 (53.39%)
■ David F. Houston (R) – 8,845 (46.61%)

Pennsylvania's 3rd congressional district, 1874:
■ Samuel J. Randall (D) – 9,703 (57.82%)
■ David F. Houston (R) – 7,060 (42.07%)
■ Benjamin L. Berry (I) – 19 (0.11%)

Pennsylvania's 3rd congressional district, 1876:
■ Samuel J. Randall (D) – 11,651 (56.31%)
■ Benjamin L. Berry (R) – 9,041 (43.69%)

Pennsylvania's 3rd congressional district, 1878:
■ Samuel J. Randall (D) – 10,717 (57.35%)
■ John Shedden (G) – 7,970 (42.65%)

Pennsylvania's 3rd congressional district, 1880:
■ Samuel J. Randall (D) – 13,639 (57.79%)
■ Benjamin L. Berry (R) – 9,912 (42.65%)
■ DeWitt C. Davis (G) – 50 (0.21%)

Pennsylvania's 3rd congressional district, 1882:
■ Samuel J. Randall (D) – 11,688 (61.55%)
■ William M. Maull (R) – 7,302 (38.45%)

Pennsylvania's 3rd congressional district, 1884:
■ Samuel J. Randall (D) – 12,340 (56.78%)
■ Jacob J. Gumper (R) – 9,055 (42.32%)

Pennsylvania's 3rd congressional district, 1886:
■ Samuel J. Randall (D) – 11,320 (95.32%)
■ Frederick Halterman (P) – 217 (1.83%)
■ Various independents – 339 (2.85%)

Pennsylvania's 3rd congressional district, 1888:
■ Samuel J. Randall (D) – 17,642 (99.37%)
■ Various independents – 112 (0.63%)

=== Speaker elections ===
1876 Speaker of the House election (Special):
■ Samuel J. Randall (D–Pennsylvania) – 162
■ James A. Garfield (R–Ohio) – 82
■ Others – 3

1877 Speaker of the House election:
■ Samuel J. Randall (D–Pennsylvania) – 149 (53.03%)
■ James A. Garfield (R–Ohio) – 132 (46.98%)

1879 Speaker of the House election:
■ Samuel J. Randall (D–Pennsylvania) – 144
■ James A. Garfield (R–Ohio) – 125
■ Others – 14
