= Celtic society =

A Celtic society (sometimes Highland society or Gaelic society more specifically) is a type of society at the four ancient universities of Scotland, and sometimes more broadly, at a city level, which were founded between the late 18th and mid-19th centuries in the wake of the Celtic Revival and Romanticism, with the primary aim of supporting the practical and academic study of the Scottish Gaelic language and culture. The student societies are the oldest at their respective universities, and were instrumental in campaigning for the establishment of academic departments dedicated to Gaelic studies.

St Andrews University Celtic Society, founded 1796, was among the first of these organisations.

== List ==
The following societies are extant and continue to promote Gaelic language and culture:

- Aberdeen University Celtic Society, founded 1854 (172 years ago)
- Caledonian Club of London, founded 1891 (135 years ago)
- Edinburgh University Highland Society, founded 1851 (175 years ago) (preceded by the Ossianic Society, 1837–1848)
- Gaelic Society of London, founded 1777 (249 years ago)
- Gaelic Society of Perth, founded 1880 (146 years ago)
- Glasgow Highland Society, founded 1727 (299 years ago)
- Glasgow University Ossianic Society, founded 1831 (195 years ago)
- Highland Society of London, founded 1778 (248 years ago) (coexisted in London for a while with Ancient Caledonian Society, 1786–1837)
- Lonach Highland and Friendly Society, founded 1823 (203 years ago)
- Royal Celtic Society (originally Celtic Society of Edinburgh), founded 1820 (206 years ago)
- Royal Highland and Agricultural Society of Scotland (formerly Highland Society of Edinburgh or Highland Society of Scotland), founded 1784 (242 years ago)
- St Andrews University Celtic Society, founded 1796 (230 years ago)

== See also ==
- Saint Andrew's society or Caledonian society
