= St. Andrew's Society of Montreal =

The Saint Andrew's Society of Montreal is a non-profit organization based in Montreal dedicated to celebrating Scottish heritage. It was founded in 1835.

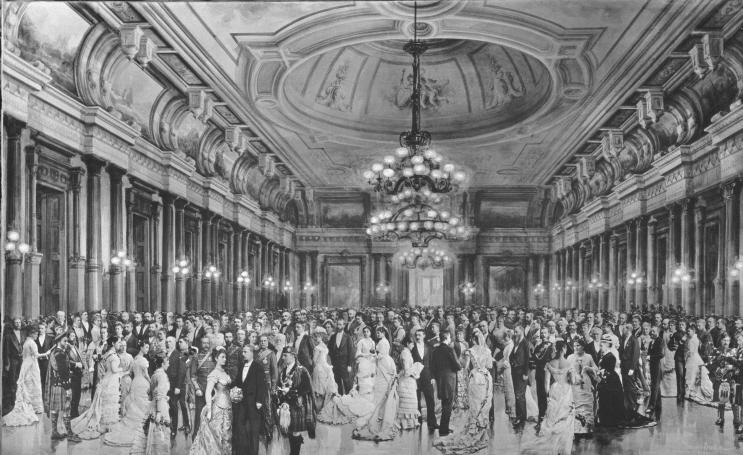
St. Andrew's Society Ball, Windsor Hotel, Montreal, QC, 1878

It was established with the stated aims of “regulating charity in a systematic manner” and “to advance the cause and welfare of Scotsmen and their descendants”. It provides funding to various groups associated with Scottish culture, promotes activities that reflect Scottish traditions and provides financial assistance to persons in need. The society also offered scholarships to students of Scottish descent.

The first president of the Society was Peter McGill, who was also the second mayor of Montreal. In 1849, following the passing of the Rebellion Losses Bill, the Society took the extraordinary step of removing the Governor General of Canada of the time, Lord Elgin, from its membership; the Governor General had formerly been a patron of the society. In 1857, the Society established St. Andrew's Home to provide a place to stay for new emigrants and other homeless Scots.

The Society operates an annual charity ball described as " one of Montréal's finest society events of the year". It also sponsors an annual fundraising event WhiskyFête, which supports a chair in Scottish Studies at McGill University. It provides a travel grant to the Centre for Scottish Studies at the University of Guelph.

== Presidents of St. Andrew's Society of Montreal ==
- Peter McGill (1835-1842)
- John Boston (1842-1844)
- Peter McGill (1844-1846)
- William Morris (1846-1847)
- James Ferrier (James Ferrier)
- Hugh Allan (1848-1850)
- William Edmonstone (1850-1851)
- James Gilmour (1851-1852)
- John Rose (1852-1855)
- William Murray (1855-1857)
- Alexander Morris (1857-1859)
- John Greenshields (1859-1861)
- David Brown (1861-1862)
- James Ferrier (1862-1864)
- John Young (1864-1866)
- J. C. Becket (1866-1867)
- William MacFarlane (1867-1868)
- Andrew Robertson (1868-1870)
- A.W. Ogilvie (1870-1871)
- Alexander McGibbon (1871-1873)
- A.T. Galt (1873-1875)
- David MacKay (1875-1876)
- Ewan McLennan (1876-1878)
- A.A. Stevenson (1878-1879)
- John C. Watson (1879-1880)
- James Stewart (1880-1882)
- George Macrae (1882-1883)
- W.W. Ogilvie (1883-1885)
- Hugh McLennan (1885-1886)
- R.B. Angus (1886-1888)
- Donald Smith, 1st Baron Strathcona and Mount Royal (1888-1890)
- Duncan McIntyre (Duncan McIntyre)
- Robert Mackay (1892-1894)
- Donald Macmaster (1894-1896)
- Hugh Paton (1896-1899)
- James Stewart (1899-1900)
- Alexander F. Ridell (1900-1903)
- William Peterson (1903-1904)
- William Miller Ramsay (1904-1906)
- ?????? (1906-1907)
- Charles Cassils (1907-1909)
- Robert Gardner (1909-1911)
- Hugh Montagu Allan (1911-1913)
- Farquhar Robertson (1913-1915)
- George R Starke (1915-1917)
- George S Cantlie (1917-1920)
- W.G. Ross (1920-1922)
- W.H. Clark-Kennedy (1922-1924)
- A.E. Ogilvie (1924-1926)
- W.H.O. Dodds (1926-1928)
- Gavin L. Ogilvie (1928-1930)
- Andrew Fleming (1930-1932)
- William Leggat (1932-1934)
- T.H. McC. Hutchinson (1934-1936)
- Hugh M Wallis (1936-1938)
- John H Bonar (1938-1940)
- Keith O. Hutchinson (1940-1945)
- A.D. Campbell (1945-1947)
- Kenneth W Dalglish (1947-1949)
- W.W. Ogilvie (1949-1951)
- Gordon S. Small (1951-1953)
- James W. Knox (1953-1955)
- S. Boyd Millen (1955-1956)
- W.C. Leggat (1956-1958)
- Alex Archibald (1958-1960)
- J. Alisdair Fraser (1960-1962)
- James F Macfarlane (1962-1964)
- NCD Mactaggart (1964-1966)
- J. Ralph Harper (1966-1968)
- Duncan C. Campbell (1968-1969)
- Alex Hutchinson (1969-1971)
- K.C. Mackay (1971-1973)
- George D. Campbell (1973-1975)
- David M. Stewart (1975-1977)
- John I.B. Macfarlane (1977-1979)
- Reford MacDougall (1979-1981)
- George Gould (1981-1983)
- Eileen Clark (1983-1985)
- J. Stuart Spalding (1985-1987)
- Clement J. Leslie (1987-1989)
- TR Anthony Malcolm (1989-1992)
- Keith W. MacLellan (1992-1994)
- Malcolm E McLeod (1994-1996)
- Daniel F. O'Connor (1996-1998)
- Martin H. Barnes (1998-2001)
- Moira R. Barclay-Fernie (2001-2003)
- A. Ian Aitken (2003-2005)
- M. Bruce McNiven (2005-2007)
- Kenneth C. Bentley (2007-2009)
- Peter McAuslan (2009-2011)
- Bruce D. Bolton (2011-2013)
- G. Scot Diamond (2013-2015)
- Brian MacKenzie (2015-2017)
- Jason MacCallum (2017-2019)
- Marilyn J. Meikle (2019-
