= Big Joe (mascot) =

Mascot of the Ottawa Redblacks

Big Joe

Big Joe (French: Grand Jos) is the mascot of the Ottawa Redblacks of the Canadian Football League (CFL). The mascot was introduced in February 2014, prior to the 2014 CFL season. The Redblacks launched a contest to provide a name to the mascot.

When originally named Big Joe Mufferaw, Redblacks owner Jeff Hunt stated, "We heard that fans loved the look of our mascot and hundreds said he had to be Big Joe Mufferaw. We like that name too because it reminds us of our city's past and fits so well into the branding of our football team." The name was a reference to French Canadian folk hero, Big Joe Mufferaw, who is based on real-life Joseph Montferrand (French: Jos Montferrand), who is often credited as a lumberjack from the Ottawa Valley. However, the name caused controversy and divided opinions, as some considered it offensive to Montferrand's surname. Criticisms of the name arose, as some fans claimed the "Mufferaw" took away from the "Frenchness" of Montferrand, and alienated French-Canadians. Due to the controversy, "Mufferaw" was dropped from the mascot's name. The name change was praised, and was seen as both a possible way of building the team's fanbase, as well as a way of discussing French-Canadian history.
