= Peter Aylen =

Timber producer and later public official

Peter Aylen (1799 – 1868) was a timber producer and later public official who was, for a time, known as "King of the Shiners".

He was likely born Peter Vallely in Armagh, Ireland in 1799 possibly the offspring of a mixed Protestant/Catholic marriage, and moved to Liverpool as a child. He joined the British navy as a cabin boy and jumped ship in Quebec City in 1815, changing his name to Aylen, thought to be his mothers maiden name. By 1832, he had become an important figure in the Ottawa Valley timber trade, holding cutting rights along the Gatineau River. Aylen also owned timber limits along the Madawaska River.

During the 1830s, Aylen hired Irish labourers left unemployed after the completion of the Rideau Canal in 1832. Known as "shiners", these workers encountered difficulties competing with the more experienced French-Canadians for jobs in the timber trade. Aylen is said to have been aggressive in competing with other timber owners: cutting wood illegally on their timber limits, destroying their log booms and terrorizing their employees. This started the Shiners' War.

Left idle near the end of winter, Aylen's men mounted a campaign of violence in the Lower Town area of Bytown during the late 1830s. In 1836, the Ottawa Lumber Association was created with Aylen a member, which eliminated much of the violence along the rivers. As a result of attempts on the life of James Johnston, who had written to the Lieutenant-Governor complaining about Aylen's activities, armed patrols were set up in Bytown, which put an end to the open violence there.

Aylen had leased a large property on the Richmond Road and also owned land in Nepean Township, acquired via marriage. In 1837, he moved across the Ottawa River to Symmes Landing, later Aylmer, in Lower Canada. In 1846, he became a member of the council for Hull Township, later becoming superintendent of roads for Ottawa County and a Justice of the Peace. In the 1850s, he built a sawmill at Chats Falls, later Fitzroy Harbour.

He died in Aylmer in 1868.
