= Alexander McGibbon =

Canadian merchant and bureaucrat

Alexander McGibbon (February 13, 1829 – February 24, 1904) was a merchant and inspector in the Canadian Department of Indian Affairs.

The son of John McGibbon and Isabella Mackison, he was born in Petite-Cote and grew up on the family farm. He began work with a Montreal merchant. In 1855, McGibbon married Harriet Davidson. The following year, he established his own business, selling tea, coffee, wines and various spirits, and groceries. McGibbon was an important member of Montreal's Scottish community, serving as president of the St. Andrew's Society and the Caledonian society. He also served on the board of governors for the Montreal General Hospital and was a member of Montreal city council from 1863 to 1866.

During the North-West Rebellion, he served as quartermaster general and chief transport officer for Major General Thomas Bland Strange. In May 1886, he was named Indian Affairs inspector for the North-West Territories. When the department was reorganized in 1897, he became inspector for the Qu'Appelle region; in 1902, he was assigned to the Calgary region.

He died of appendicitis in Calgary at the age of 75.
