= Shiners' War =

Military war

Date	1835 to 1845
Location	Bytown, now Ottawa 45.417°N 75.7°W
Result	Combatives arrested

Belligerents
"Shiners" (gang of Irish-Catholic immigrants)	French Canadian; Other citizens of Bytown

Commanders and leaders
Peter Aylen	Joseph Montferrand

The Shiners' Wars were violent outbreaks in Bytown (now Ottawa) from 1835 to 1845 between Irish-Catholic immigrants, led by Peter Aylen, and French Canadians, led by Joseph Montferrand.

The war began when Aylen, a major Irish timber operator, organized a group of Irishmen to attack other timber operations—this group was known as the "Shiners." The Shiners attacked French-Canadian timber rafts and the town's political institutions, as well as brawling with French Canadians on the streets.

In an attempt to control the violence, the citizens of Bytown created the Association of the Preservation of the Public Peace in Bytown, which included armed patrols; however, the violence continued. In the spring of 1837, the violence was brought under control after the government deployed troops to arrest the Shiners. Occasional violence still occurred until 1845 by groups claiming to be the Shiners.

== Overview ==
In 1832, the Rideau Canal had just been constructed. Its completion left many Irishmen out of work. To add to the unemployment, the lumber industry was dominated by French Canadians. At the time, they considered the Irish to be at the lowest rung of the social ladder due to historical antipathy and their refusal to assimilate. Many Irish lumbermen were laid off and moved to the Bytown area (now Ottawa Valley), where they displaced some of the area's French timber workers.

Peter Aylen, a major Irish timber operator, was sympathetic to the Irishmen, gaining him their allegiance. He organized a gang of Irish supporters—calling them the "Shiners"—to attack other timber operations. Aylen personally gained an advantage from this violence (which was primarily in the form of brawling) as it disrupted his competitors.

The Shiners were accused of such crimes as assault, arson, rape, and murder. On one occasion, the pregnant wife of a farmer, who had upset the Shiners somehow, was attacked while driving home in a sleigh with other female family members. Beaten with sticks, the farmer's wife attempted to jump to safety, but her clothing got caught in the sleigh and she was dragged over the frozen ground before coming free. The Shiners cut her horses loose from the sleigh, running them off. The horses managed to find their way home the next day; their ears and tails had been mutilated. Other actions also attributed to the Shiners' campaign of terror included stripping children naked in the snow, polluting wells, accosting women in the street, and shattering windows. On one occasion, they reportedly broke up a funeral procession and threw the coffin off of the hearse into the street.

=== 1835–36 ===
In 1835, Shiners began interdicting timber rafts owned by French Canadians going down the Ottawa River to Montreal.

As well as gaining control of the lumber industry, Aylen set his sights to taking over Bytown. Aylen ordered his Irish supporters to attack French Canadian and drive them out of the area, thus guaranteeing jobs and high wages to the Irish, especially the Shiners. Though special constables were assigned as peacekeepers, they were on Aylen's payroll or for some other reason looked the other way. When pursued, all that the hooligans had to do to evade arrest was cross the border into Lower Canada. As there was no jail or courthouse in Bytown, those who were arrested had to be transported to Perth, Ontario, for trial. However, poorly-paid officers were reluctant to make the 50-mile trip, fearing being ambushed along the way.

The Irishmen also controlled the Union Bridge at Chaudière Falls, where lumberman Joseph Montferrand was ambushed and supposedly fought off over 150 Shiners. This event was an example of Montferrand's tough defense of rights of French-Canadians, which made him the natural leader of the French Canadians against Aylen's Irishmen.

In August 1835, Bathurst District Agricultural Society's one-dollar membership fee allowed Aylen and his Shiners to overwhelm authentic members, after which they elected Aylen and his friends as directors. This, however, was one step too far. On 20 October that year, a group of prominent Bytown citizens formed the Association of the Preservation of the Public Peace and appealed to town magistrates for 100 guns in order to arm citizens. To combat the Shiners, the town formed a volunteer force called the Bytown Rifles. Unfortunately, the Rifles would quickly disintegrate as nobody was willing to serve under its disciplinarian commander, Captain Baker. In an attempt to control the violence and keep the peace, vigilantes made nightly patrols. While these vigilantes had some success in maintaining order, the Shiners continued to terrorize the citizens of Bytown.

In March 1836, the leading lumbermen of the town founded the Ottawa Lumber Association as an additional step in suppressing violence in their industry. With Aylen as one of its officers, however, the first act of the new organization was “to improve the movement of timber” on the Madawaska River where Aylen had operations, which likely meant protecting Aylen's timber interests from upset French Canadians.

=== 1837 ===
The violence peaked in 1837. The area experienced a peak in Irish immigration, and endured financial crisis, rising prices, and increased unemployment in the lumber camps.

In early January 1837, Aylen and his cronies disrupted the election of councillors to the Nepean Township Council, held in Bytown at John Stanley's Tavern. Aylen was elected as one of the three councillors. Nonetheless, he demanded that the other two positions be filled with his men as well, so a gang of 40 to 60 of his men stormed the meeting room. As result, several of Aylen's opponents, including James Johnson—who founded Bytown's first newspaper, the Bytown Independent and Farmer’s Advocate—were violently beaten with sticks and horse whips in both the meeting room and the Tavern's courtyard. The meeting ended with legitimate attendees fleeing. The Shiners destroyed provincial statutes and other important papers. Order was restored by intervention of the military.

Ten days after the incident, an official inquiry into the riot was held by 4 Bytown magistrates. Most of the 12 or so witnesses who testified blamed Aylen for the affair; Aylen and his men did not testify. Concluding that intense measures were necessary in order to prevent such breach of the peace from occurring again, the magistrates recommended the establishment of a municipal police force as well as the building of a courthouse and jail in Bytown.

In early March 1837, armed men went to the house of James Johnson, who had tried to defend the democratic process during the January riot, on the pretense of searching for a different man. The armed men fired shots into the upstairs rooms, but nobody was hurt. A short time later, three men armed with guns and whips ambushed Johnson on Sappers’ Bridge. Johnson jumped into deep snow and saved himself from the attack. This time, Shiners were not able to act with impunity: the three men who stacked Johnson were arrested and taken to Perth to stand trial. Aylen broke them out of jail. They were recaptured in late 1837, put on trial for attempted murder and found guilty, serving 3 years with hard labour in a penitentiary .

=== End to the violence ===
By this time, Bytown citizens themselves had become better organized. Aylen had been charged with a number of offences over the years without any apparent consequence. But in 1837 he either sold or rented out his properties on the Upper Canada side of the Ottawa River and moved to Aylmer in Lower Canada, where he continued in the lumber business and apparently became a respected member of the community. He died in 1868.

The Shiners faded without Peter Aylen to lead them. Occasional violence still occurred by groups claiming to be the Shiners until 1845 and the late 1840s.

== Shiners ==
It is unknown how the name "Shiners" was given to Irish involved in the fighting. Some possibilities exist:

- A derivation of the French word chêneur, meaning cutter of oak trees.
- A self-designation to "shine" above others.
- The new, "shiny" coins that they were paid in.
- Shiner also means a black eye and by extension this name could refer to those who give them to someone else.

== In popular culture ==
In 2018, a graphic novel, The Shiners' War, was published in Ottawa. The story, written by Conor Ryan and illustrated by Shawn Daley, follows two fictional characters through the conflicts of the era, and features figures of the time within the plot, including Joseph Montferrand and Peter Aylen.

== See also ==
- List of incidents of civil unrest in Canada
