= Hugh Paton =

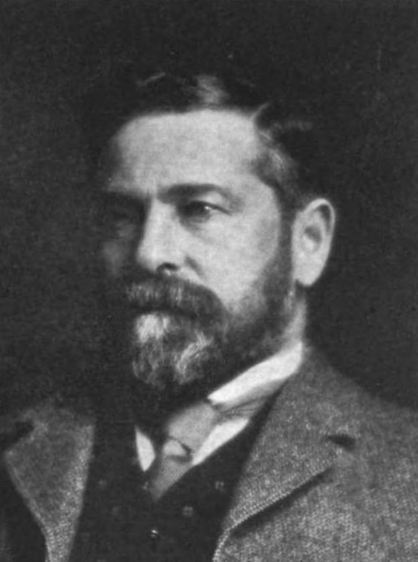
- Born: October 5, 1852; Johnstone, Scotland
- Died: January 28, 1941 (aged 88); Montreal, Quebec
- Occupation: Businessman
- Spouse: Isabella Robertson (m. 1884)

Hugh Paton (October 5, 1852 – January 28, 1941) was a Scottish business owner in Montreal.

== Biography ==
The son of William Paton and Mary Shedden, he was born in Johnstone, Renfrewshire, was educated in Paisley and came to Canada in 1871. He was first employed as private secretary for his uncle John Shedden, a railway contractor based in Toronto. His uncle was killed in a railway accident in 1873 and Paton became secretary-treasurer for The Shedden Forwarding Company, which handled storage, collection and cartage services for the Grand Trunk Railway; also at this time, he moved to Montreal. After the death of the company's manager in 1879, Paton became manager and later company president. He was also a director for the Bell Telephone Company of Canada, the Royal Bank of Canada, The Canadian Transfer Company, the Montreal Trust Company, the Canadian Express Company, the London & Lancashire Assurance Company, The Northern Electric Manufacturing Company, the Wire & Cable Company and the Sincennes-McNaughton Company.

Paton was honorary secretary-treasurer of the Montreal Tandem Club, the Montreal Hunt Club and the Province of Quebec Turf Club. He was vice-president and then president for the St. Andrew's Society of Montreal. He also served on the board of governors for the Montreal General Hospital and the Notre Dame Hospital.

In 1884, he married Isabella, the daughter of Andrew Robertson.

From 1880 to 1942, he was owner of Île Paton in the Rivière des Prairies, where he built his home, greenhouses and a golf course.

He died at his home in Montreal on January 28, 1941, at the age of 88.
