= Shiner (Ottawa) =

Shiners were gangs of Irish immigrants that formed in the early days of Bytown, later Ottawa, mainly active during the 1830s.

After the completion of the Rideau Canal in 1832, many Irish workers were left unemployed. The timber industry, the major economic activity in the region at the time, mainly employed French-Canadian labourers, who were reputed to be hard-working and better skilled. Out of frustration, some of the unemployed banded together to try to create jobs for themselves by intimidation. This started the Shiners' War. At this time, the town of Bytown did not have a permanent police force. From street fights, the violence escalated into robbery and murder. James Johnston, a prominent businessman and journalist, was beaten and his home was attacked.

One of the lumber barons, Peter Aylen, only employed Irish workers and called himself "King of the Shiners". The logger Joseph Montferrand took the side of the French-Canadians, inspiring many tales elevating him to the status of local legend.

In 1837, the town magistrates formed armed patrols to monitor the town at night. This largely put an end to the gangs and violence, although some outbreaks continued to occur into the 1840s.
