= Neil Stewart (Canadian politician) =

Neil Stewart (1793– May 8, 1881) was a Scottish-born merchant and political figure in Canada West. He represented Prescott in the Legislative Assembly of the Province of Canada from 1844 to 1848.

He came to Upper Canada from the Isle of Skye with his family in 1816. Stewart settled at Vankleek Hill. He served as the first postmaster for Vankleek Hill, as a justice of the peace and as county treasurer. Stewart was also a member of the local militia, reaching the rank of lieutenant-colonel. In 1828, he married Alice McCann.

His brother William represented Russell and then Bytown in the assembly. His daughter Isabella married prominent Montreal businessman Hugh McLennan.

In 1878, Stewart established two prizes awarded annually to students studying biblical Hebrew language and literature in the Faculty of Religious Studies at McGill University.
