= Hugh McLennan =

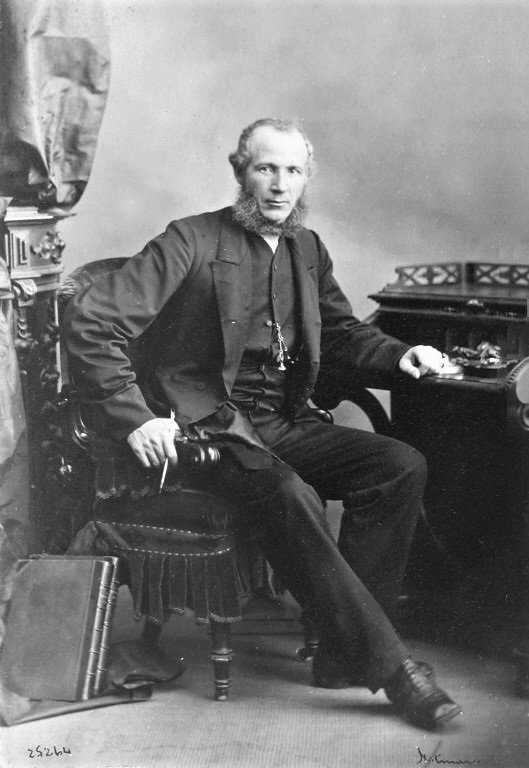
Hugh McLennan, Montreal, 1867

Hugh McLennan (June 26, 1825 – November 22, 1899) was a Canadian merchant of Scottish descent who was primarily based in Montreal.

== Early life ==
The son of John McLennan, who came to Canada from Scotland in 1802, he was born in Lancaster, Upper Canada, and was educated in Glengarry County. In 1842, he moved to Montreal to work in a hardware business there.

== Career ==
He later worked as a purser on steamships that travelled between Montreal and Kingston. In 1850, he was promoted to freight agent, at first based in Kingston and later in Montreal. In 1853, with his brother, he founded a grain and shipping company, later known as the Montreal Transportation Company with McLennan as president. In 1856, he moved with his family to Chicago, where he became involved in the trade in pork and bacon. McLennan returned to Montreal in 1867.

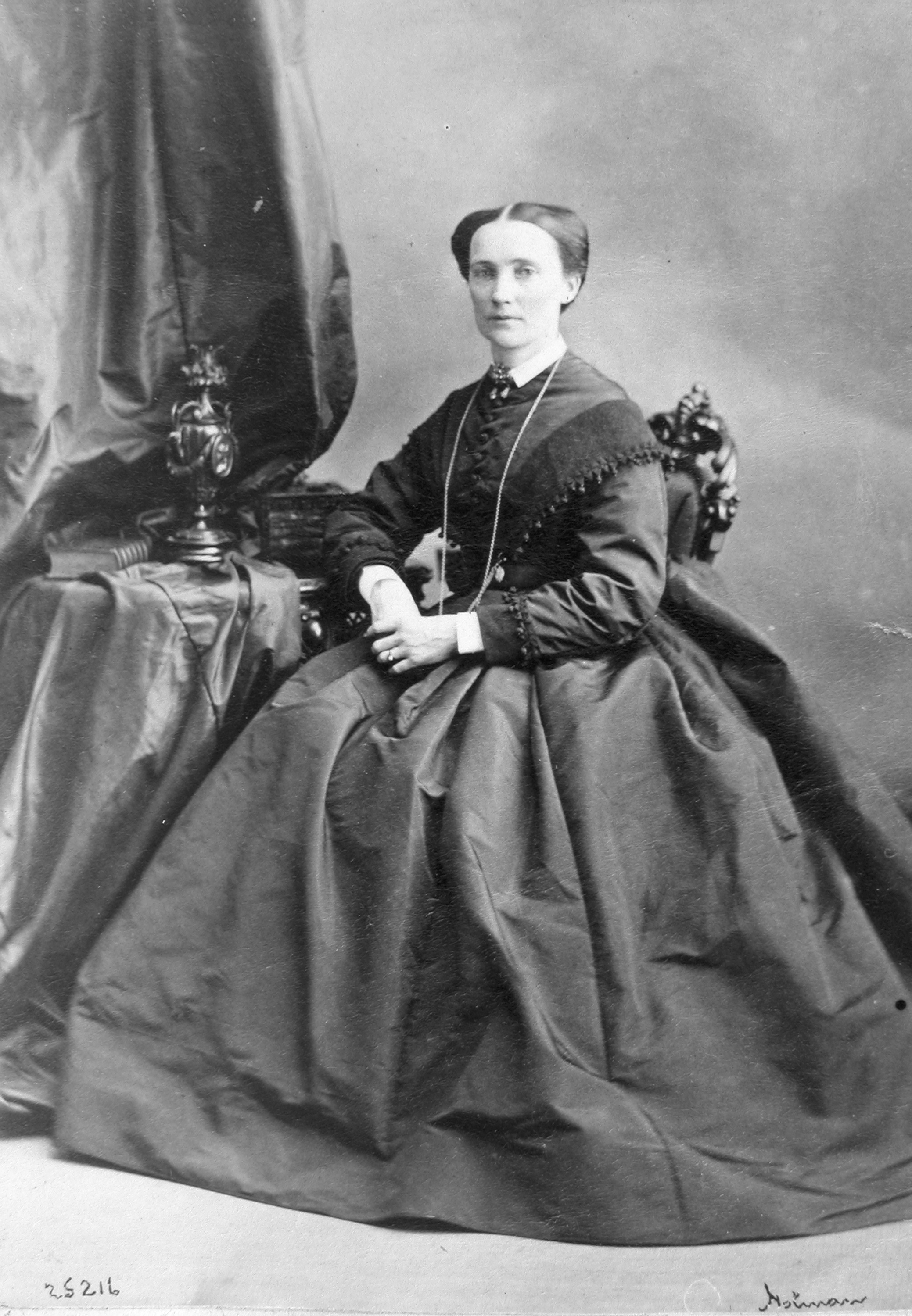
Isabella Stewart taken by William Notman in his studio in Montreal in 1867.

He served as a director for various companies, including Bank of Montreal, Canada Paper Company, the British America Fire and Life Assurance Company and Sun Life. McLennan was also president of the International Coal Company Ltd and the Black Diamond Steamship Company. From 1872 to 1874, he was president of the Montreal Board of Trade; he also represented the Board of Trade on the Montreal Harbour Commission. McLennan served on the board of governors of McGill University and was president of the St. Andrew's Society of Montreal from 1885 to 1886. He retired from business in 1898.

== Personal life ==
McLennan married Isabella Stewart, the daughter of Neil Stewart. His son John Stewart later served in the Canadian Senate. His son, William, was an author and fellow in the Royal Society of Canada.

He died in Montreal at the age of 74.

== See also ==
- Golden Square Mile
- History of Montreal
- Lower Canada
- Scots-Quebecers
