= Joseph Montferrand =

Canadian logger and strongman (1802–1864)

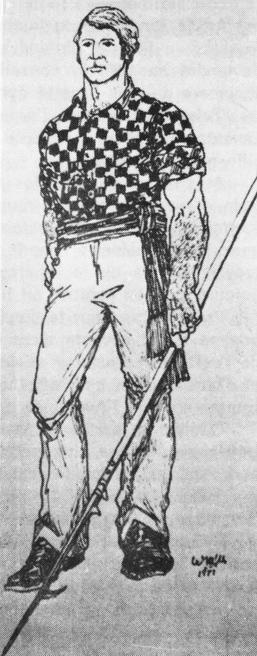
- Drawing of Montferrand by W. M. Macdonnel
- Born: Joseph Favre; October 25, 1802; Montreal, Quebec
- Died: October 4, 1864 (aged 61); Montreal, Quebec
- Resting place: Notre Dame des Neiges Cemetery, Montreal, Quebec
- Occupations: lumberjack, professional boxing
- Spouses: Marie-Anne Trépanier; Esther Bertrand
- Children: Joseph-Louis Montferrand
- Relatives: one sister (Hélène) and two brothers

Joseph "Jos" Montferrand (French: [ʒozɛf mɔ̃fɛʁɑ̃]; born Joseph Favre [favʁ]; October 25, 1802 – October 4, 1864) was a French-Canadian logger, strongman, and folk hero of the working man and was the inspiration for the legendary Ottawa Valley figure Big Joe Mufferaw.

== Life ==
Joseph Favre, dit Montferrand, was born in the St. Lawrence district of Montreal in 1802. The family men were known for their strength and powerful build. Joe was 6 ft 4 in (1.93 m) tall with blue eyes and fair hair. Although he was mild in manner and appearance, he could more than hold his own in a street fight. He successfully challenged several famed boxers during his youth. He came to fame as a result of a challenge issued at a boxing match in the Champ de Mars, Montreal. Two English-speaking boxers had just fought for the championship. The organizers then asked if there was anyone in the crowd who wished to challenge the champion of Canada. The 16-year-old Montferrand stepped into the ring and, with one punch, felled the champion. News of the surprising event spread quickly.

At the age of 21, he joined the Hudson's Bay Company as a voyageur. In 1827, he began work as a logger on the Rivière du Nord in Lower Canada and then moved to the upper Ottawa River. The loggers felled trees over the winter, drove the logs down the river, and eventually arrived at Quebec City. Montferrand would also briefly have a stint in the United States, working for the Amoskeag Manufacturing Company in Manchester, New Hampshire. Montferrand spent the remainder of his working years in the lumber trade in the Outaouais. There was ongoing animosity between Anglophones and Francophones and frequent fights between English-, Irish-, and French-Canadian loggers. Montferrand's prowess with his fists and boots was legendary in avenging the wrongs to which he and his compatriots were subjected.

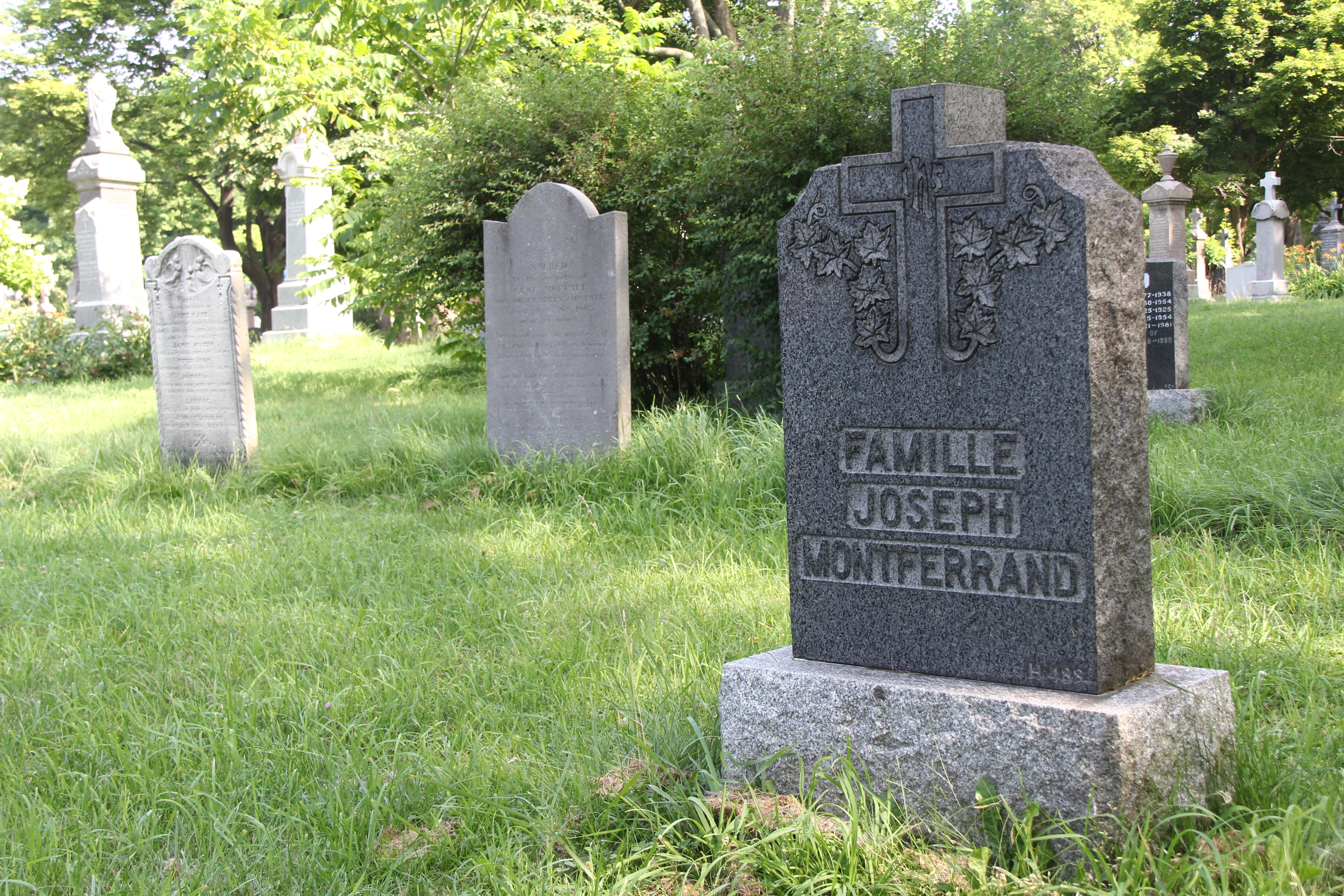
Headstone of Joseph Montferrand

Montferrand defended French-Canadian workers against gangs of Irish immigrants known as "Shiners" in the Bytown area. After 1840, he mainly worked the log drives as foreman and retired in 1857. In his later years, he had back and joint pain. He died in Montreal in 1864, aged 61, and was interred at the Notre Dame des Neiges Cemetery.

== Legacy ==
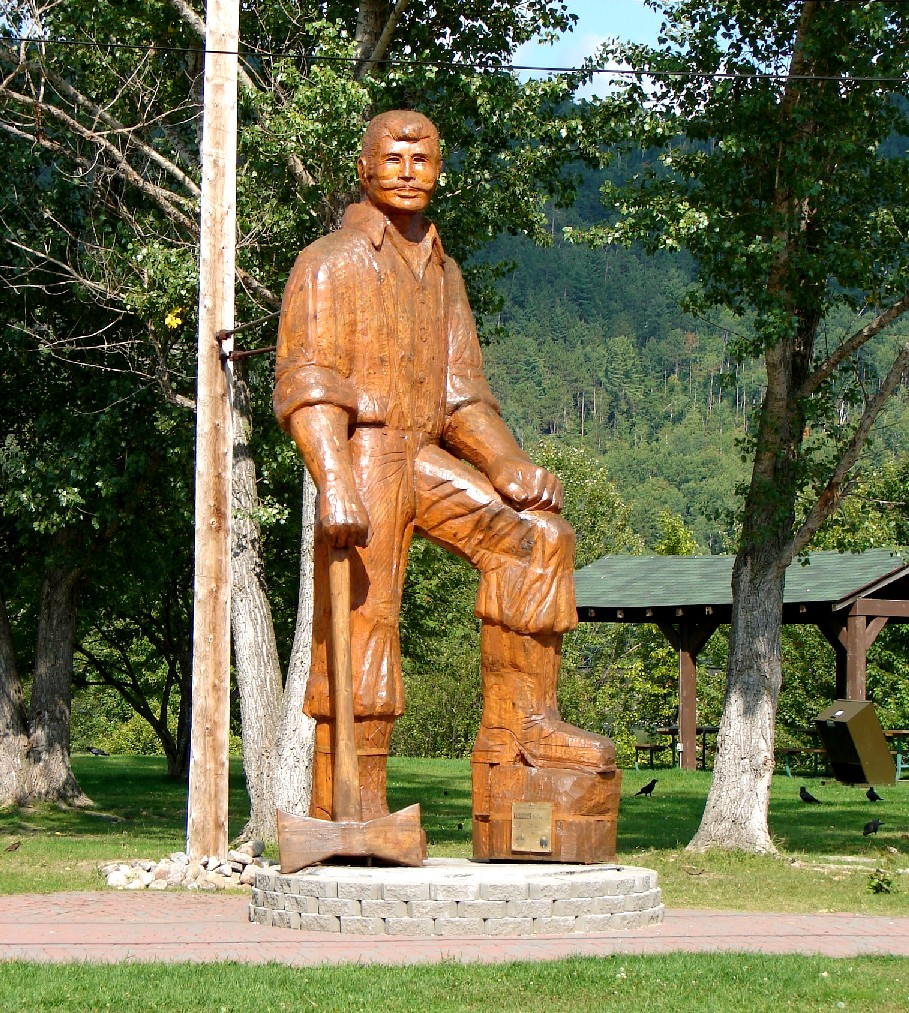
Statue of Mufferaw in Mattawa, Ontario.

Montferrand's legendary nickname, Big Joe Mufferaw (also sometimes spelled Muffero, Muffera, Muffraw), is believed to be a result of English speakers mispronouncing "Montferrand" phonetically. He was already a legitimate folk hero in his own time, but his reputation grew into the mythical hero when exaggerated tales were told about him. Like Paul Bunyan, he became the subject of many similar tall tales. Mufferaw is sometimes enlisted as a defender of oppressed French-Canadian loggers in the days that their bosses were English-Canadians and their rivals at work were Irish-Canadians. In one story, Big Joe was in a Montreal bar, and a British army major named Jones was freely insulting French-Canadians. After Big Joe beat the major, he bellowed, "Any more insults for the Canadians?" Some Mufferaw tales take place in the Northeastern United States.

The French-Canadian writer Benjamin Sulte told this man's story in a 1884 book. He is also the subject of a chapter in Joan Finnigan's 1981 book Giants of the Ottawa Valley and her 1983 book Look! The Land Is Growing Giants. Bernie Bedore of Arnprior also wrote several books that recount Joe's adventures.

Stompin' Tom Connors made him the hero of a 1970 song.

A statue of Joe Mufferaw was erected outside the Mattawa Museum in Mattawa, Ontario, during the spring of 2005. Carved by local carving artist Peter Cianafrani, it was his last statue before he died later that spring. A plaque commemorating his name sits at the base of the statue. Montferrand was also the inspiration for the Big Joe mascot of the Ottawa Redblacks Canadian Football League team. A park named Parc Jos-Montferrand in Montreal commemorates him.

Montferrand was named a National Historic Person by the federal government in 2023.

== See also ==
- Baillargeon brothers
- Paul Bunyan
- Louis Cyr

== Bibliography ==
- Histoire de Jos. Montferrand, l'athlète canadien, Benjamin Sulte, Montreal: J.B. Camyre (1883) OL 15743760W
- The shanty: a story from the Ottawa Valley of Canada, Bernie Bedore, Arnprior, Ontario: Mufferaw Enterprises (1975)
- Tall tales of Joe Mufferaw, Bernie Bedore, Toronto: Consolidated Amethyst Communications (1979)
- Jos Montferrand : le géant des rivières, Mathieu-Robert Sauvé, XYZ, 2007.
- Montferrand: v.1 Le prix de l'honneur; v.2. Un géant sur le pont, Paul Ohl, Libre Expression, 2009.
- Jos, P. J. Poirier, Marchand de feuilles, 2010.
- Bourgoin Louis-Marie, « Jos. Montferrand, contremaître de chantier et guide de cage », Asticou, cahier no 23 (juin 1980), p. 34-39.
- Choquette Robert, L'Ontario français historique, Montréal, Éditions Études Vivantes, 1980, 272 p.
- Côté Jean, Jos Montferrand, le magnifique, Montréal, Éditions Quebecor, 1980, 136 p.
- Du Berger Jean, « Histoire de Montferrand : l’athlète canadien and Joe Muffraw », Journal of American Folklore », vol. 73 (1960), p. 23-34.
- Gaffield Chad (dir.), Histoire de l'Outaouais, Québec, Institut québécois de recherche sur la culture, 1994, 876 p.
- Gouin Jacques, « Jos. Montferrand : Histoire, légende et symbole », Asticou, cahier no 3 (juillet 1969), p. 5-9.
- Goyer Gérard et Jean Hamelin, Joseph Montferrand, dans Dictionnaire biographique du Canada, vol. IX. Québec, Presses de l'Université Laval, 1977, p. 620-623.
- Lemieux Gilles, « La vie de l'illustre Joe Montferrand par Sir Wilfrid Laurier », Asticou, cahier no 8 (décembre 1971), p. 27-34.
- Montpetit André-Napoléon Nos hommes forts, Québec, C. Darveau, 1884, 196 p.
- Ohl Paul, Montferrand : le prix de l’honneur, tome I, Montréal, Libre Expression, 2008, 376 p.
- Ohl Paul, Montferrand : un héros sur le pont, tome II, Montréal, Libre Expression, 2009, 376 p.
- Prévost Michel, «Jos Montferrand, de la légende à la réalité», Histoire Québec, vol. 1, no 1 (juin 2005), p. 37-40.
- Prévost Michel, «Joseph (Jos) Montferrand : roi des forêts de l'Outaouais ou pilier de tavernes?», Cap-aux-Diamants, 69 (printemps 2002), p. 13-17.
