= Saint Andrew's society =

Organisation promoting Scottish heritage and/or providing aid to immigrants from Scotland

A Saint Andrew's society or Caledonian society is any of a variety of independent organizations celebrating Scottish heritage. They are found all over the world, and are especially common in areas of large-scale historic immigration from Scotland, though medium-to-large cities anywhere may have enough Scottish diaspora to support such a club. They are generally not-for-profit or charitable organizations. Some have alternative names such as "St Andrews & Caledonian Club of [Place]", "[Place] Scottish Association", "North British Society of [Place]", "[Place] Scots Club", etc.

== Purpose ==
Early groups of this sort were founded primarily as friendly societies or other mutual-aid societies, pooling financial contributions to provide post-immigration and other assistance to members and their families, invest in Scottish-owned businesses, provide scholarships for descendants, etc. Most today have branched into (or were more recently founded to focus entirely on) organising social, cultural, and arts activities, as well as promoting the preservation of Scottish heritage – often without any remaining financial charitible programmes, especially among the smaller clubs. Such a society is often involved in (or may be the sole organiser of) annual public Highland games and dance events in their area, though some of the larger events, including Grandfather Mountain HG and Stone Mountain HG, are their own non-profit organisations with input from multiple Caledonian/St Andrew's societies in their regions.

When an area has had more than one such organization (for example both a Saint Andrews society and a Caledonian club), it is common for them to eventually merge (sometimes also with a literary Burns club in the same area), especially as their activities increasingly shift toward socio-cultural events and away from charitable grant-making.

Some such societies limit membership to people born in Scotland, but more often they are open to Scots' descendants (or have no membership criteria). Those that provide scholarships and other charity services may limit them to Scots by birth or descent. A few still only accept male members, though this is increasingly rare (a hold-over from the early groups often being founded as men's fraternal benefit orders); some that still operate this way have closely affiliated (or subsidiary) sister organisations for women.

Some diasporic clubs are associated loosely with the original Saint Andrew's Society of Edinburgh, Scotland, but many are not.

== Africa region ==
=== Kenya ===
- Caledonian Society of Kenya, founded 1904

== America region ==
=== Brazil ===
- St. Andrew Society of São Paulo – São Paulo

=== Canada ===
- St. Andrew–Caledonian Society of Calgary – Calgary, Alberta
- St. Andrew's Society of Winnipeg – Winnipeg, Manitoba
- Fredericton Society of Saint Andrew – Fredericton, New Brunswick
- North British Society – Halifax, Nova Scotia
- St. Andrew's Society of Pictou County – New Glasgow, Nova Scotia; founded 1921
- St. Andrew’s Society of Ottawa – Ottawa, Ontario
- St. Andrews Society of Petrolia – Petrolia, Ontario
- St. Andrew's Society of Toronto – Toronto, Ontario
- St. Andrew's Society of Montreal – Montreal, Quebec

=== Chile ===
- St. Andrews Society of Valparaiso – Valparaiso

=== Mexico ===
- St. Andrew's Society of Mexico – Montes Escandinavos, Distrito Federal

=== Panama ===
- Panama St. Andrews Society – Panama City

=== United States ===
==== Alabama ====
- St. Andrews Society of Mid-South – Birmingham
- St. Andrews Society of Southeast Alabama – Enterprise; defunct
- St. Andrews Society of Montgomery – Montgomery
- St. Andrew’s Society of the Middle South – Middle South
- St. Andrews Society of Tuscaloosa – Tuscaloosa

==== California ====
- Saint Andrew's Society of San Francisco – San Francisco
- St. Andrew's Society of Los Angeles – Beverly Hills
- St. Andrew's Society of Southern California – Beverly Hills
- St. Andrew's Society of Sacramento – Sacramento
- St. Andrew's Society of the East Bay (formerly Saint Andrew's Society of Oakland) – Pleasanton
- St. Andrew's Society of Modesto – Modesto

==== Colorado ====
- St. Andrew Society of Colorado – Denver

==== Connecticut ====
- St. Andrew's Society of Connecticut – Litchfield

==== Florida ====
- St. Andrew's Society of Central Florida – Central Florida
- St. Andrew's Society of Jacksonville – Jacksonville
- Saint Andrew's Society Naples – Naples
- St. Andrew's Society of Tallahassee – Tallahassee
- St. Andrew's Society of Tampa Bay – Tampa
- St. Andrew's Society of Sarasota – Sarasota

==== Georgia ====
- St. Andrew's Society of Atlanta – Marietta (Atlanta suburb); organises the Stone Mountain Highland Games, formerly the largest such event in the US
- St. Andrew's Society of Savannah – Savannah

==== Hawaii ====
- Saint Andrew's Society of Hawaii – Honolulu

==== Illinois ====
- St. Andrew's Society of Central Illinois – Springfield
- Illinois Saint Andrew's Society (Chicago Scots) – North River (Chicago suburb)

==== Indiana ====
- St. Andrew's Society of Evansville – Evansville

==== Kansas ====
- Topeka St. Andrew's Society – Silver Lake

==== Louisiana ====
- St. Andrews Society of Louisiana – New Orleans

==== Maine ====
- St. Andrew's Society of Maine – Augusta

==== Maryland ====
- St. Andrew's Society of Baltimore – Baltimore
- St. Andrew's Society of Mid-Maryland – Frederick
- St. Andrew's Society of the Eastern Shore – Easton

==== Massachusetts ====
- St. Andrew’s Society of Massachusetts – North Weymouth

==== Michigan ====
- St. Andrew’s Society of Detroit – Detroit

==== Minnesota ====
- St. Andrew's Society of Minnesota – Woodbury

==== Missouri ====
- Kansas City Saint Andrew Society – Kansas City
- Greater St. Louis St. Andrew's Society – Chesterfield
- Springfield Saint Andrew & Burns Society – Springfield

==== Nevada ====
- St. Andrew's Society of Southern Nevada – Las Vegas, Nevada

==== New Hampshire ====
- St. Andrew's Society of New Hampshire – North Salem; defunct

==== New Mexico ====
- St. Andrew Scottish Society of New Mexico – Albuquerque

==== New York ====
- St. Andrew's Society of the Adirondacks – Adirondacks
- St. Andrew's Society of Albany – Albany
- St. Andrew's Society of Central New York – Baldwinsville
- Saint Andrew's Society of the State of New York – New York City
- St. Andrew's Society of Schenectady – Schenectady

==== North Carolina ====
- Carolina Highlands St. Andrew's Society – Fletcher
- Saint Andrew's Society of North Carolina – Southern Pines
- Saint Andrew Society of Carolina – Charlotte

==== North Dakota ====
- St. Andrew's Society of Fargo-Moorhead – Fargo

==== Ohio ====
- St. Andrew's Society of Dayton – Centerville

==== Oregon ====
- St. Andrew's Society of Oregon – Portland
- Mid-Willamett St. Andrew's Society – Salem

==== Pennsylvania ====
- St. Andrew's Society of Philadelphia – Philadelphia
- St. Andrew's Society of Pittsburgh – Pittsburgh

==== Rhode Island ====
- St. Andrew's Society of Rhode Island – Cranston

==== South Carolina ====
- St. Andrew's Society of Aiken – Aiken
- St. Andrew's Society of Charleston – Charleston
- St. Andrew's Society of Lowcountry – defunct
- St. Andrew's Society of Upper South Carolina – Greenville

==== Tennessee ====
- St. Andrew's Society of East Tennessee – Knoxville

==== Vermont ====
- St. Andrew's Society of Vermont – Essex Junction

==== Virginia ====
- St. Andrew's Society of Richmond – Glen Allen (Richmond suburb)
- St. Andrew's Society of Tidewater – Virginia Beach
- St. Andrew's Society of Williamsburg – Williamsburg

==== Washington, DC ====
- St. Andrew's Society of Washington, DC

==== Washington state ====
- The Caledonian & St. Andrew's Society of Seattle – Seattle
- St. Andrew's Society of the Inland Northwest – Spokane

==== Wisconsin ====
- St. Andrew's Society of Madison – Madison
- St. Andrew's Society of Milwaukee – Milwaukee
- St. Andrew's Society of Mid-Maryland – Frederick

=== Uruguay ===
- St. Andrew's Society of Uruguay – Montevideo

=== Argentina ===
- St. Andrew's Society of the River Plate – Ciudad Autónoma de Buenos Aires. Argentina

== Asia region ==
=== Brunei ===
- Saint Andrews Society of Bandar Negara – Darussalam

=== China ===
- St. Andrew's Society of Hong Kong – Hong Kong

=== Indonesia ===
- Java St. Andrew Society – Jakarta

=== Philippines ===
- Manila St. Andrew's Society – Manila

=== Singapore ===
- St Andrew's Society of Singapore – Singapore city

=== Thailand ===
- Bangkok St Andrew's Society – Bangkok

== Europe region ==
=== Greece ===
- St. Andrew's Society of Athens – Athens

=== United Kingdom ===
==== England ====
- Saint Andrew’s Society of Manchester – Altrincham, Trafford, Greater Manchester

==== Scotland ====
- Saint Andrew's Society of Edinburgh – Edingburgh, Lothian
- St. Andrews Society of Aberdeen – Aberdeen, Aberdeenshire
- St Andrews Society of Glasgow – Lenzie, East Dunbartonshire (suburb of Glasgow)

== Oceania region ==
=== Australia ===
- Society of St. Andrew of Scotland Queensland – Toowong, Brisbane
- Saint Andrews Society of Western Australia – Perth

=== New Zealand ===
- St Andrew's Society of Otago – Dunedin
- St Andrews Scottish Society and Burns Club Southland – Invercargill

== See also ==
- Burns club
- Celtic society or Highland society or Gaelic society
- Scottish diaspora
- Category:Scottish diaspora by country
