= John Shedden =

Scottish-born Canadian businessman

John Shedden (November 4, 1825 – May 16, 1873) was a Scottish-born Canadian business owner and contractor involved in railway development.

The son of John Shedden and Jean Wyllie, he was born in Kilbirnie, Ayrshire and was educated at the Irvine Academy. He worked on the Glasgow and South Western Railway, later moving to Virginia. Shedden came to Canada in 1855, creating a cartage firm with partner William Hendrie. Their firm serviced the Great Western Railway and later the Grand Trunk Railway and had offices in Toronto, Hamilton and London. The partnership dissolved around 1859 with Shedden remaining as cartage agent for the Grand Trunk Railway. He opened another office for the firm in Detroit. Shedden was also involved in constructing, having worked on the Grand Trunk grain elevator in Toronto and Union Station. He worked on the construction of the Toronto, Grey and Bruce Railway and was also a stock-holder and director for the railway company. He also worked on the Toronto and Nipissing Railway and served as its president.

Shedden was a director for The Toronto Daily Telegraph. He served as a director for the St. Lawrence Bank.

He died at the age of 47 after he was crushed between moving railway cars and a railway platform at Cannington.

His nephew Hugh Paton took over the operation of his cartage company moved onto Montreal to develop his career.
