= Bytown (Province of Canada electoral district) =

Province of Canada electoral district

Bytown Canada West
Province of Canada electoral district

Defunct pre-Confederation electoral district
- Legislature: Legislative Assembly of the Province of Canada
- District created: 1841
- District abolished: 1867
- First contested: 1841
- Last contested: 1863

Bytown was an electoral district of the Legislative Assembly of the Parliament of the Province of Canada. The district represented the town of Bytown, in Canada West, which was re-named Ottawa in 1855. The electoral district was created in 1841, upon the establishment of the Province of Canada, from the merger of Upper Canada and Lower Canada. It was renamed to Ottawa following the renaming of the city.

Bytown was represented by one member in the Legislative Assembly. It was abolished in 1867, upon the creation of Canada and the province of Ontario.

== Boundaries ==
Bytown electoral district was primarily centred on the town of Bytown, Canada West (now Ottawa, Ontario). It was located on the south shore of the Ottawa River, which was the boundary with Canada East, now the province of Quebec.

The Union Act, 1840 merged the two provinces of Upper Canada and Lower Canada into the Province of Canada, with a single Parliament. The separate parliaments of Lower Canada and Upper Canada were abolished. Prior to the Union, Bytown had been included in the electoral district of the County of Carleton in the Legislative Assembly of Upper Canada, but the Union Act provided that Bytown would constitute a separate electoral district in the Legislative Assembly of the new Parliament.

The Union Act gave the Governor General of the Province of Canada the power to draw the boundaries for the electoral district. The first Governor General, Lord Sydenham, issued a proclamation shortly after the formation of the Province of Canada in early 1841, establishing the boundaries for the electoral district:

The Town of Bytown shall be bounded and limited as follows to wit: —commencing on the western shore of the River Rideau in the limit between lots lettered E. and F. in the broken concession D. on the River Rideau, in the Township of Nepean; then south sixty-six degrees west, one hundred and seventy-five chains, more or less, to the limit between lots numbers thirty-nine and forty, in the first concession from the Ottawa, of the said Township of Nepean; then north sixteen degrees west, ninety-one chains, more or less, to the River Ottawa; then easterly and north-easterly, following the waters of the same with the stream, to the mouth of the River Rideau; then following the waters of the said River Rideau against the stream, to the place of beginning.

== Members of the Legislative Assembly ==
Bytown was represented by one member in the Legislative Assembly. The following were the members for Bytown.

Parliament	Years	Member	Party
1st Parliament; 1841–1844	1841–1844	Stewart Derbishire	Moderate Reformer
2nd Parliament; 1844–1847	1844–1847	William Stewart	Conservative
3rd Parliament; 1848–1851	1848–1851	John Scott	Conservative
4th Parliament; 1852–1854	1852–1854	Daniel McLachlin	Reformer
5th Parliament; 1854–1857	1854–1857	Agar Yielding	Conservative
6th Parliament; 1858–1861	1858–1861	Richard William Scott	Liberal-Conservative
7th Parliament; 1861–1863	1861–1863	Richard William Scott	Liberal-Conservative
8th Parliament; 1863–1866	1863–1866	Joseph Merrill Currier	Conservative

== Significant elections ==
In the first general election of 1841, Lord Sydenham was actively involved. He took all possible steps to ensure that a majority of the members elected to the Legislative Assembly would be supporters of the union of the Canadas. During a tour of Canada West, he stopped in Bytown and urged three of the declared candidates for the seat to withdraw in favour of his preferred candidate, Stewart Derbishire, even though Derbishire had no connection to Bytown. As part of his arguments, Sydenham told them that it was due to his influence that Bytown had received its own seat, separate from Carleton County. The three candidates withdraw, but a fourth, William Stewart continued in his candidacy. When the vote was held in March, 1841, Derbishire was elected, by a vote of 52 to 29. Stewart issued two public protests, accusing the returning officer of partisanship, but did not formally contest the result.

== Abolition ==
The district was abolished on July 1, 1867, when the British North America Act, 1867 came into force, creating Canada and splitting the Province of Canada into Quebec and Ontario. It was succeeded by electoral districts of the same name in the House of Commons of Canada and the Legislative Assembly of Ontario.
