= George Lyon (Canadian politician) =

George Lyon (1790 – 26 March 1851) was a captain in the British Army and a Canadian businessman and politician.

He was born in Inverurie, Scotland in 1790. In 1806 he was commissioned Ensign in the 40th Foot and in 1809, as a lieutenant, he transferred to the 100th Foot. In November 1810, he went to Upper Canada (now Ontario with his regiment. He served with them in the War of 1812. After the regiment disbanded in 1818, he was given a land grant of 500 acres (2 km^{2}) and settled in Richmond. He acquired additional lands when he built a grist mill and sawmill there. He also built a distillery and opened a store.

He became a major in the local militia in 1843. He represented the County of Carleton in the Legislative Assembly of Upper Canada from 1833 to 1834 and in the Legislative Assembly of the Province of Canada from 1846 to 1847.

He died in Richmond in 1851.

His sons included:

- G. B. Lyon-Fellowes, a lawyer, mayor of Ottawa and a member of the Legislative Assembly for the United Canadas
- Robert Lyon, a lawyer, judge, mayor of Ottawa and member of the Legislative Assembly of Ontario
- William Radenhurst Richmond Lyon, the first reeve of Richmond

His younger brother, Robert Lyon, died in a duel in Perth in 1833.
