= Edinburgh University Highland Society =

Information
- Established: 1851
- Website: https://gaelic.ed.ac.uk/the-highland-society

Edinburgh University Highland Society (Scottish Gaelic Comann Ceilteach Oilthigh Dhùn Èideann) is the Gaelic language and Celtic Studies society at the University of Edinburgh. Established in 1851, it is the oldest society at the university. It is the successor organization to the short-lived Ossianic Society, which was founded in 1837.

The society runs the Highland Annual Ball (Scottish Gaelic An Dannsa Bliadhnail) each spring, a ceilidh for students and the wider Edinburgh Gaelic community which has been a prominent fixture of the Gaelic calendar in the city for many decades.
