= 1867 Canadian federal election =

- August 7 – September 20, 1867

180 seats in the House of Commons 91 seats needed for a majority
- Registered: 361,028
- Turnout: 74.3% (Note: Elections Canada reported a 73.1% voter turnout.)
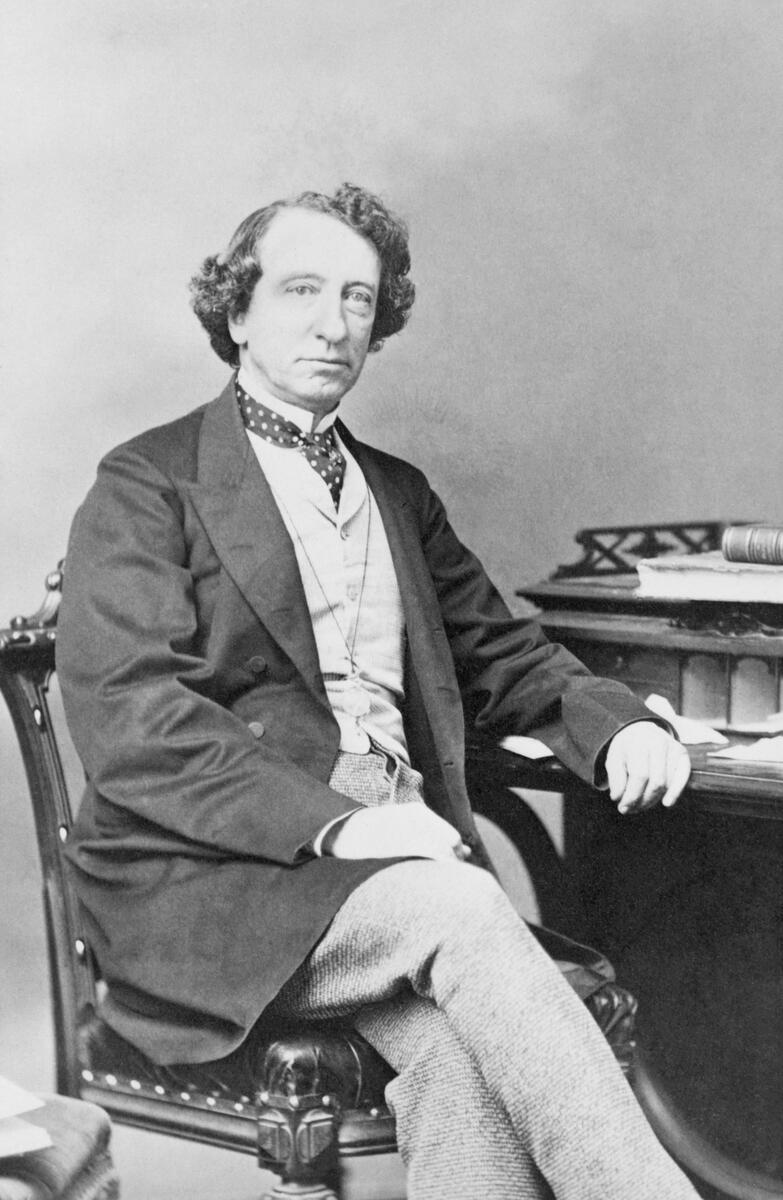

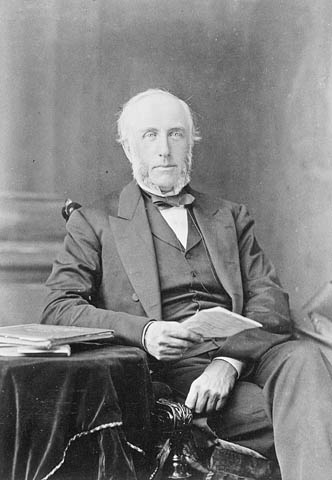

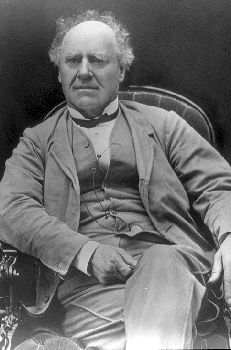
| | First party | Second party | Third party |
|---|---|---|---|
| Leader | John A. Macdonald | George Brown (unofficial) | Joseph Howe |
| Party | Conservative & Liberal–Conservative | Liberal | Anti-Confederation |
| Leader since | July 1, 1867 | 1867 | 1867 |
| Leader's seat | Kingston | Ran in Ontario South (lost) | Hants |
| Seats won | 100 (Note: Though Liberal-Conservatives were identifying themselves as such, these MPs (29 MPs) and those identifying as Conservatives (71 MPs) were both led by Sir John A. Macdonald (himself a Liberal-Conservative) and sat together in the House of Commons forming a 100 MPs majority.) | 62 | 18 |
| Popular vote | 93,909 | 60,818 | 21,239 |
| Percentage | 35.0% | 22.7% | 7.9% |
- Popular vote by electoral riding. (Because seats are awarded by the popular vote in each riding, the provincial popular vote does not necessarily translate to more seats.)
Prime Minister before election
John A. Macdonald
Conservative
Prime Minister after election
John A. Macdonald
Conservative

The 1867 Canadian federal election was held from August 7 to September 20, 1867, and was the first federal election in Canada following post-Confederation. It was held to elect members representing electoral districts in the provinces of Nova Scotia, New Brunswick, Ontario and Quebec to the House of Commons of the 1st Canadian Parliament. The provinces of Manitoba (1870) and British Columbia (1871) were created during the term of the 1st Parliament of Canada and were not part of this election.

Sir John A. Macdonald had been sworn in as prime minister by the Governor General, Lord Monck, when the new Canadian nation was founded on 1 July 1867. As leader of the Conservative Party of Canada (known as the Liberal-Conservative Party until 1873), he led his party in this election and continued as Prime Minister of Canada when the Conservatives won a majority of the seats in the election, including majorities of the seats (and votes) in the new provinces of Ontario and Quebec.

The Liberal Party of Canada won the second most seats overall, including a majority of the seats (and votes) in the province of New Brunswick. The Liberals did not have a party leader in the election. George Brown, who was the leader of the Liberal Party of Ontario, was considered the "elder statesman" of the national party. Brown ran concurrently for seats in the Legislative Assembly of Ontario and the House of Commons of Canada, and might well have been Prime Minister in the unlikely event that the Liberals prevailed over the Conservatives in the national election. Brown failed to win a seat in either body, and the national Liberals remained officially leaderless until 1873.

The Anti-Confederation Party, led by Joseph Howe, won the third most seats overall, based solely on a majority of seats (and votes) in the province of Nova Scotia. Their main desire was the reversal of the decision to join Confederation, which was unpopular in that province. The goals of the Anti-Confederation Members of Parliament (MPs) were openly supported by five of the Liberal MPs of New Brunswick. The Anti-Confederation MPs sat with the Liberal caucus. The government in Britain refused to allow Nova Scotia to secede. After that, most of the Anti-Confederation MPs (11 of 18) moved to the majority Conservatives.

== Election rules ==
The first Canadian election took place without a uniform set of election laws to govern the election of members to the House of Commons, an interim measure until Parliament could pass its own election laws, which did not come until 1885. Instead, the election was contested under the rules set by each individual province prior to Confederation, and future elections were to be contested under provincial rules until a time when federal parliament set their own rules. Because of this, rules governing having the right to voting were inconsistent, as was the method of casting a ballot.

The BNA Act did stipulate that in the district of Algoma any male British subject of 21 years of age or older, "being a householder," would have the right to vote.

The election took place over a six-week period from August 7 to September 20, with electoral district polls closing at different dates throughout the period. Under the system each electoral district was required to be polled in one day, but the day did not have to be the same across all electoral districts. The exception to the extended polling period (often called "polling circuits") being Nova Scotia which abolished the practice of polling different districts on different days after excessive violence was reported in the 1843 election.

The election in Kamouraska, Quebec was delayed due to rioting.

Halifax was a two-member riding at the time of the election. The City of Saint John and the County of Saint John was represented by just one district.

=== Franchise ===
The basic general requirement to vote across provinces was the requirement to be a male British subject 21 years of age or older. Voting was conducted in Ontario, Quebec and Nova Scotia through oral vote which required an eligible elector to declare their choice. New Brunswick had adopted a form of secret ballot in 1855, where electors write the name of a candidate on a piece of paper and deposit the vote in a ballot box.

In all provinces, women and government employees including civil servants, judges, police and prosecutors were not permitted to vote. Indigenous individuals who met property criteria were excluded from voting eligibility in most provinces if they received a benefit paid by the government.

The Ontario elections laws were updated in 1866, with electors required to meet a property qualification of being an owner or tenant with a property value listed on the assessment roll of $600 in a city, $400 in a town, $300 in an incorporated village, and $100 in a township or police village. (Note: The value of property required to be eligible to vote for a member of parliament is listed as $200 in an urban area and $100 in a rural area by Elections Canada A History of the Vote in Canada, however that number provided in the publication is a general amount for the period from 1867 to 1885 before federal law was passed governing franchise.) Furthermore, urban residents must prove an annual income of at least $250. An estimated 16.5 per cent of the population of Ontario was enfranchised for the 1867 election. In Quebec, the property qualification for being an owner was $300 in urban areas and $200 in rural areas, and a tenant required a rent of $30 in an urban area or $20 in a rural area. Nova Scotia's election laws were passed in 1863, and had a property qualification for owners or tenants of $150, and enfranchised persons with $300 of personal property. while New Brunswick had a property qualification for owners of $100 and an annual income of $400, but also gave the vote to anyone who owned real or personal property with a total value of $400 or more.

=== Electoral system, Representation by population ===
The number of members in each province in Confederation was set by the Constitution Act, 1867 on the principle of representation by population. The Act provided Quebec a minimum of 65 seats, and seat allotment for the remainder of the country was based by dividing the population of Quebec by 65 and then using it as a base to determine the number of seats for each of the other provinces. The Act also specified that redistribution and boundary reviews should occur after each 10 year census.

Thus there were 181 MPs in the first House of Commons – 82 from Ontario, 65 from Quebec, 19 from Nova Scotia, and 15 from New Brunswick. Each was elected in a single-member district, except there were two elected in the Halifax riding. Each voter could cast one vote as under first past the post, except Halifax voters who cast up to two votes (Plurality block voting).

== Results ==

| Party | Party leader | # of candidates | Elected | Popular vote | |
| Party | Party leader | # of candidates | Elected | # | % |
|---|---|---|---|---|---|
| Conservative | Sir John A. Macdonald | 83 | 71 | 64,179 | 23.92% |
| Liberal-Conservative | Sir John A. Macdonald | 32 | 29 | 29,730 | 11.08% |
| Liberal | none (unofficially, George Brown) | 66 | 62 | 60,818 | 22.67% |
| Anti-Confederation (Note: Anti-Confederates sat with the Liberal Party in the House of Commons.) | Joseph Howe | 20 | 18 | 21,239 | 7.92% |
| Independents | | 1 | - | 1,756 | 0.65% |
| Independent Liberal | | 1 | - | 1,048 | 0.39% |
| Unknown | | 140 | - | 89,547 | 33.37% |
| Vacant – 1 | | – | 0 | – | – |
| Total | | 343 | 180 | 268,317 | 100% |

Acclamations

The following MPs were acclaimed:

- Ontario: 3 Conservative, 3 Liberal-Conservatives, 9 Liberals
- Quebec: 14 Conservatives, 5 Liberal-Conservatives, 4 Liberals
- New Brunswick: 1 Conservative, 3 Liberals
- Nova Scotia: 4 Anti-Confederates

Vacancy

The election in Kamouraska, Quebec, was cancelled due to rioting at the polling places. No member was elected for the riding until a by-election in 1869.

=== Results by province ===
| Party name | | Ontario | Quebec | NB | NS | Total |
|---|---|---|---|---|---|---|
| Conservative | Seats | 33 | 36 | 1 | 1 | 71 |
| Conservative | Vote | 26.2% | 28.5% | | 13.8% | 23.2% |
| Liberal-Conservative | Seats | 16 | 11 | 2 | - | 29 |
| Liberal-Conservative | Vote | 12.5% | 12.3% | 11.1% | 3.5% | 11.1% |
| Liberal | Seats | 33 | 17 | 12 | | 62 |
| Liberal | Vote | 23.7% | 25.2% | 49.5% | | 22.7% |
| Anti-Confederation | Seats | | | | 18 | 18 |
| Anti-Confederation | Vote | | | | 58.2% | 7.9% |
| Unknown | Seats | - | - | - | - | - |
| Unknown | Vote | 35.6% | 34.1% | 39.3% | 23.06% | 34% |
| Independent | Seats | - | | | | - |
| Independent | Vote | 1.3% | | | | 0.7% |
| Independent Liberal | Seats | - | | | | - |
| Independent Liberal | Vote | 0.7% | | | | 0.4% |
| Total seats | | 82 | 64 | 15 | 19 | 180 |

=== By district ===
==== Nova Scotia ====
===== Western Nova Scotia =====
| Electoral District | Candidates | | | Incumbent |
| Electoral District | Winner | Runner up | Other | Incumbent |
|---|---|---|---|---|
| Annapolis | William Hallett Ray (A Conf); 1,171 | Avard Longley (Cons.); 1,016 | | William Hallett Ray, Avard Longley & George Whitman |
| Colchester | Archibald McLelan (A Conf.); 1,649 | Adams George Archibald (Lib.-Cons.); 1,289 | | Archibald McLelan, William Blackwood, Adams George Archibald & Francis R. Parker |
| Cumberland | Charles Tupper (Cons.); 1,368 | William Annand (A Conf.); 1,271 | | Charles Tupper, Alexander Macfarlane & Robert Donkin |
| Digby | Alfred William Savary (A Conf); 792 | John Chipman Wade (Cons); 497 | William Mehan; 362 | John Chipman Wade, Mathurin Robicheau, Colin Campbell |
| Halifax | Alfred Gilpin Jones (A Conf); 2,381; Patrick Power (A Conf); 2,367 | John Tobin; 2,158; Samuel Leonard Shannon; 2,154 | | John Tobin, Samuel Leonard Shannon, Henry Pryor, William Annand & Henry Balcom |
| Hants | Joseph Howe (A Conf); 1,530 | James W. King; 956 | | Ezra Churchill, William Dawson Lawrence, James W. King & Lewis W. Hill |
| Kings | William Henry Chipman (A Conf.); 1,472 | J. N. Coleman; 659 | | Charles C. Hamilton, Caleb Rand Bill, Daniel Charles Moore & Edward L. Brown |
| Lunenburg | Edmund Mortimer McDonald (A Conf); 1,557 | Henry Kaulback; 905 | | Henry S. Jost, Henry Kaulback & Abraham Hebb |
| Queens | James F. Forbes (A Conf); 844 | John Campbell; 271 | | John Campbell, Andrew Cowie & Charles Allison |
| Shelburne | Thomas Coffin (A Conf); Accl. | | | Thomas Coffin, John Locke & Robert Robertson |
| Yarmouth | Thomas Killam (A Conf); 1,225 | George Stayley Brown; 666 | | Thomas Killam, George Stayley Brown & Isaac Hatfield |

===== Eastern Nova Scotia =====
| Electoral District | Candidates | | | Incumbent |
| Electoral District | Winner | Runner up | Other | Incumbent |
|---|---|---|---|---|
| Antigonish | Hugh McDonald (A Conf); 1,238 | William Alexander Henry (Cons.); 390 | | William Alexander Henry & John McKinnon |
| Cape Breton | James McKeagney (A Conf.); Accl. | | | Thomas Caldwell & John George Bourinot |
| Guysborough | Stewart Campbell (A Conf.); Accl. | | | William O. Heffernan & Stewart Campbell |
| Inverness | Hugh Cameron (A Conf); 1,186 | Samuel McDonnell (Cons.); 601 | | Hiram Blanchard, Peter Smyth & Samuel McDonnell |
| Pictou | James William Carmichael (A Conf); 2,011 | James McDonald (Cons.); 1,653 | | James Fraser, James McDonald, Donald Fraser & Alexander MacKay |
| Richmond | William Joseph Croke (A Conf); 545 | Donovan; 279 | | Isaac LeVesconte & William Miller |
| Victoria | William Ross (A Conf.); Accl. | | | William Ross & Charles James Campbell |

==== New Brunswick ====
===== Northern New Brunswick =====
| Electoral District | Candidates | | | Incumbent |
| Electoral District | Winner | Runner up | Other | Incumbent |
|---|---|---|---|---|
| Gloucester | Timothy Anglin (Lib); 1,061 | John Meahan; 671 | | Robert Young & John Meahan |
| Kent | Auguste Renaud (Lib); 876 | Lestock P. W. DesBrisay; 757 | Owen McInerney; 485; Robert Barry Cutler; 4 | William Shand Caie & Owen McInerney |
| Northumberland | John Mercer Johnson (Lib); 1,226 | Thomas F. Gillespie; 757 | | John Mercer Johnson, Edward Williston, Richard Sutton, George Kerr |
| Restigouche | John McMillan (Lib); 370 | John Phillips; 259 | | John McMillan & Alexander C. DesBrisay |
| Victoria | John Costigan (Lib-Cons); 778 | William Blackwood Beveridge; 549 | James Workman; 16; James Tibbetts; 0 | Benjamin Beveridge & Vital Hébert |

===== Southern New Brunswick =====
| Electoral District | Candidates | | | Incumbent |
| Electoral District | Winner | Runner up | Other | Incumbent |
|---|---|---|---|---|
| Albert | John Wallace (Lib); 778 | Henry J. Stevens; 714 | | Abner Reid McClelan & John Lewis |
| Carleton | Charles Connell (Lib) acclaimed | | | Charles Connell & William Lindsay |
| Charlotte | John Bolton (Lib); 1,214 | Robert Thompson; 918 | | John McAdam, James G. Stevens, Francis Hibbard, James Watson Chandler |
| City and County of St. John | John Hamilton Gray (Cons) acclaimed | | | Charles Nelson Skinner, John Hamilton Gray, Robert Duncan Wilmot, James Quinton |
| City of St. John | Samuel Leonard Tilley (Lib-Cons); 1,402 | John Wilson; 610 | | Samuel Leonard Tilley & Andrew Rainsford Wetmore |
| King's | George Ryan (Lib); 1,303 | George Otty; 1,083 | | George Ryan, William P. Flewelling, John Flewelling |
| Queen's | John Ferris (Lib) acclaimed | | | John Ferris, Robert Thorne Babbit |
| Sunbury | Charles Burpee (Lib); 664 | William E. Perley; 425 | | John Glasier & William E. Perley |
| Westmorland | Albert James Smith (Lib); 2,207 | Israël Landry; 454 | | Albert James Smith, Bliss Botsford, Angus McQueen, Amand Landry |
| York | Charles Fisher (Lib) acclaimed | | | Hiram Dow, Charles Fisher, Alexander Thompson, John Adolphus Beckwith |

==== Quebec ====
===== Eastern Quebec =====
| Electoral District | Candidates | | | Incumbent |
| Electoral District | Winner | Runner up | Other | Incumbent |
|---|---|---|---|---|
| Bonaventure | Théodore Robitaille (Cons); 1,018 | M. Tremblay; 444 | | Théodore Robitaille (Bleu) |
| Dorchester | Hector Louis Langevin (Cons) acclaimed | | | Hector Louis Langevin (Bleu) |
| Gaspé | Pierre-Étienne Fortin (Cons) acclaimed | | | John Le Boutillier (Bleu) |
| Kamouraska | No election due to rioting | | | Jean-Charles Chapais (Bleu) |
| Lévis | Joseph-Goderic Blanchet (Lib-Cons) acclaimed | | | Joseph-Goderic Blanchet (Bleu) |
| L'Islet | Barthélemy Pouliot (Cons); 464 | Louis-Bonaventure Caron; 40 | | Louis-Bonaventure Caron (Rouge) |
| Montmagny | Joseph-Octave Beaubien (Cons) acclaimed | | | Joseph-Octave Beaubien (Bleu) |
| Rimouski | George Sylvain (Cons); 1,152 | Augustin Michaud; 697 | | George Sylvain (Bleu) |
| Témiscouata | Charles Bertrand (Cons) acclaimed | | | Jean-Baptiste Pouliot (Rouge) |

===== Quebec City area and Saguenay =====
| Electoral District | Candidates | | | Incumbent |
| Electoral District | Winner | Runner up | Other | Incumbent |
|---|---|---|---|---|
| Charlevoix | Simon-Xavier Cimon (Cons); 999 | Adolphe Gagnon; 911 | | Adolphe Gagnon (Rouge) |
| Chicoutimi—Saguenay | Pierre-Alexis Tremblay (Liberal) acclaimed | | | Pierre-Alexis Tremblay (Liberal) |
| Montmorency | Joseph-Édouard Cauchon (Cons) acclaimed | | | Joseph-Édouard Cauchon (Bleu) |
| Quebec County | Pierre-Joseph-Olivier Chauveau (Cons) acclaimed | | | François Évanturel (Liberal) |
| Quebec East | Pierre-Gabriel Huot (Liberal) acclaimed | | | Pierre-Gabriel Huot (Rouge) |
| Quebec West | Thomas McGreevy (Lib-Cons) acclaimed | | | Charles Joseph Alleyn (Cons) |
| Quebec-Centre | Georges-Honoré Simard (Cons); 1,291 | P. Garneau; 5 | Blanchet; 2 | Isidore Thibaudeau (Rouge) |

===== Central Quebec =====
| Electoral District | Candidates | | | Incumbent |
| Electoral District | Winner | Runner up | Other | Incumbent |
|---|---|---|---|---|
| Berthier | Anselme-Homère Pâquet (Lib); 1,131 | L. Trachemontagne; 1,095 | | Anselme-Homère Pâquet (Rouge) |
| Champlain | John Jones Ross (Cons); 1,449 | M. Martineau; 305 | | John Jones Ross (Bleu) |
| Joliette | François Benjamin Godin (Lib); 918 | Louis François Georges Baby (Cons); 862 | | Hippolite Cornellier (Bleu) |
| L'Assomption | Louis Archambeault (Lib-Cons); 898 | Pierre-Urgel Archambault; 665 | | Louis Archambeault (Rouge) |
| Lotbinière | Henri-Gustave Joly de Lotbinière (Lib) acclaimed | | | Henri-Gustave Joly de Lotbinière (Rouge) |
| Maskinongé | George Caron (Cons); 702 | Moïse Houde; 564 | | Moïse Houde (Rouge) |
| Montcalm | Joseph Dufresne (Cons) acclaimed | | | Joseph Dufresne (Bleu) |
| Nicolet | Joseph Gaudet (Cons); 1,070 | M. Rousseau; 499 | | Joseph Gaudet (Bleu) |
| Portneuf | Jean-Docile Brousseau (Cons); 1,027 | I. P. Dery; 718 | Dubord; 1 | Jean-Docile Brousseau (Lib-Cons) |
| Saint Maurice | Louis-Léon Lesieur Désaulniers (Cons) acclaimed | | | Charles Gérin-Lajoie (Rouge) |
| Three Rivers | Louis-Charles Boucher de Niverville (Cons); 277 | C. B. Genest; 143 | | Louis-Charles Boucher de Niverville (Bleu) |
| Yamaska | Moïse Fortier (Lib); 797 | Joseph Albert Norbert Provencher (Cons); 760 | | Moïse Fortier (Rouge) |

===== Eastern Townships =====
| Electoral District | Candidates | | | Incumbent |
| Electoral District | Winner | Runner up | Other | Incumbent |
|---|---|---|---|---|
| Bagot | Pierre-Samuel Gendron (Cons); 1,156 | Maurice Laframboise; 889 | | Maurice Laframboise (Rouge) |
| Beauce | Christian Pozer (Lib); 1,180 | Henri Elzéar Taschereau; 629 | | Henri Elzéar Taschereau (Bleu) |
| Bellechasse | Louis-Napoléon Casault (Cons); 983 | Édouard Rémillard; 671 | | Édouard Rémillard (Rouge) |
| Brome | Christopher Dunkin (Cons) acclaimed | | | Christopher Dunkin (Cons) |
| Compton | John Henry Pope (Lib-Cons) acclaimed | | | John Henry Pope (Cons) |
| Drummond—Arthabaska | Louis-Adélard Senécal (Cons); 1,135 | M. Houle; 1,111 | | Jean-Baptiste-Éric Dorion (Rouge) |
| Mégantic | George Irvine (Cons); 1,000 | P. O. Triganne; 733 | | George Irvine (Cons) |
| Missisquoi | Brown Chamberlin (Cons); 1,190 | Philip Henry Moore; 497 | | James O'Halloran (Rouge) |
| Richmond—Wolfe | William Hoste Webb (Cons); 1,137 | Beique; 903 | | William Hoste Webb (Cons) |
| Shefford | Lucius Seth Huntington (Lib); 1,317 | Parmelee; 991 | | Lucius Seth Huntington (Rouge) |
| Sherbrooke (Town of) | Alexander Tilloch Galt (Lib-Cons) acclaimed | | | Alexander Tilloch Galt (Lib-Cons) |
| Stanstead | Charles Carroll Colby (Lib-Cons); 814 | Albert Knight; 616 | | Albert Knight (Cons) |

===== Montérégie Est =====
| Electoral District | Candidates | | | Incumbent |
| Electoral District | Winner | Runner up | Other | Incumbent |
|---|---|---|---|---|
| Chambly | Pierre Basile Benoit (Cons); 691 | V. P. W. Dorion; 526 | | Charles Boucher de Boucherville (Bleu) |
| Iberville | François Béchard (Lib); 1,035 | Alexandre Dufresne; 504 | | Alexandre Dufresne (Rouge) |
| Richelieu | Thomas McCarthy (Cons); 777 | Joseph-Xavier Perrault; 625 | P. Gélinas; 450 | Joseph-Xavier Perrault (Rouge) |
| Rouville | Guillaume Cheval dit St-Jacques (Lib); 1,236 | Joseph-Napoléon Poulin; 824 | | Joseph-Napoléon Poulin (Bleu) |
| St. Hyacinthe | Alexandre-Édouard Kierzkowski (Lib); 1,107 | Rémi Raymond; 929 | | Rémi Raymond (Bleu) |
| St. John's | François Bourassa (Lib); 696 | Charles Laberge; 600 | | François Bourassa (Rouge) |
| Verchères | Félix Geoffrion (Lib); 831 | L. H. Massuee; 740 | | Félix Geoffrion (Rouge) |

===== Vallée-du-Haut-Saint-Laurent =====
| Electoral District | Candidates | | | Incumbent |
| Electoral District | Winner | Runner up | Other | Incumbent |
|---|---|---|---|---|
| Beauharnois | Michael Cayley (Cons); 724 | Paul Denis; 691 | | Paul Denis (Bleu) |
| Châteauguay | Luther Hamilton Holton (Lib); 1,013 | Thomas Kennedy Ramsay; 586 | | Luther Hamilton Holton (Rouge) |
| Huntingdon | John Rose (Lib-Cons); 1,280 | W. H. Kerr; 468 | | Robert Brown Somerville (Ind) |
| Laprairie | Alfred Pinsonneault (Cons); 750 | M. Normandeau; 293 | | Alfred Pinsonneault (Bleu) |
| Napierville | Sixte Coupal dit la Reine (Lib); 878 | M. Laviolette; 344 | | Sixte Coupal dit la Reine (Rouge) |
| Soulanges | Luc-Hyacinthe Masson (Cons); 729 | M. Guindon; 470 | | William Duckett (Cons) |
| Vaudreuil | Donald McMillan (Cons) acclaimed | | | Antoine Chartier de Lotbinière Harwood (Cons) |

===== Hochelaga Archipelago =====
| Electoral District | Candidates | | | Incumbent |
| Electoral District | Winner | Runner up | Other | Incumbent |
|---|---|---|---|---|
| Hochelaga | Antoine-Aimé Dorion (Lib); 1,312 | J. Lanouette; 1,289 | | Antoine-Aimé Dorion (Rouge) |
| Jacques Cartier | Guillaume Gamelin Gaucher (Cons); 659 | M. Brunet; 542 | | Guillaume Gamelin Gaucher (Bleu) |
| Laval | Joseph-Hyacinthe Bellerose (Cons) acclaimed | | | Joseph-Hyacinthe Bellerose (Bleu) |
| Montreal Centre | Thomas Workman (Lib) acclaimed | | | John Rose (Cons) |
| Montreal East | George-Étienne Cartier (Lib-Cons); 2,431 | M. Lanctot (Lib); 2,085 | | George-Étienne Cartier (Bleu) |
| Montreal West | Thomas D'Arcy McGee (Lib-Cons); 2,675 | Bernard Devlin (Lib); 2,478 | | Thomas D'Arcy McGee (Cons) |

===== Laurentides & Outaouais =====
| Electoral District | Candidates | | | Incumbent |
| Electoral District | Winner | Runner up | Other | Incumbent |
|---|---|---|---|---|
| Argenteuil | John Abbott (Lib-Cons); 693 | B. Hutchins; 595 | | John Abbott (Lib) |
| Ottawa (County of) | Alonzo Wright (Lib-Cons) acclaimed | | | Alonzo Wright (Cons) |
| Pontiac | Edmund Heath (Cons) acclaimed | | | John Poupore (Bleu) |
| Terrebonne | Louis-Rodrigue Masson (Cons) acclaimed | | | Louis Labrèche-Viger (Lib) |
| Two Mountains | Jean-Baptiste Daoust (Cons) acclaimed | | | Jean-Baptiste Daoust (Reformer) |

==== Ontario ====
===== Ottawa Valley =====
| Electoral District | Candidates | | | Incumbent |
| Electoral District | Winner | Runner up | Other | Incumbent |
|---|---|---|---|---|
| Carleton | John Holmes (Lib-Cons); 1,087 | John Rochester (Cons); 1,006 | | William Frederick Powell (Cons) |
| Lanark North | William McDougall (Lib-Cons) acclaimed | | | William McDougall (Reformer) |
| Lanark South | Alexander Morris (Cons) acclaimed | | | Alexander Morris (Cons) |
| Ottawa (City of) | Joseph Merrill Currier (Lib-Cons); 974 | Alexander Gibb; 25 | Edward McGillivray; 5 E. Martineau; 1 Moss Kent Dickinson; 0 Philip Thompson; 0 | Joseph Merrill Currier (Cons) |
| Prescott | Albert Hagar (Lib); 1,205 | Thomas Higginson; 130 | | Thomas Higginson (Cons) |
| Renfrew North | John Rankin (Cons); 613 | Thomas Murray; 527 | | Robert McIntyre (Reformer); Renfrew |
| Renfrew South | Daniel McLachlin (Lib) acclaimed | | | Robert McIntyre (Reformer); Renfrew |
| Russell | James Alexander Grant (Cons); 1,293 | Robert Bell; 695 | | Robert Bell (Cons) |

===== St. Lawrence Valley =====
| Electoral District | Candidates | | | Incumbent |
| Electoral District | Winner | Runner up | Other | Incumbent |
|---|---|---|---|---|
| Addington | James Lapum (Cons); 1,120 | Schuyler Shibley (Lib-Cons); 991 | Henry Smith; 2 Price; 1 D. Cameron; 0 Hamm; 0 Lott; 0 | New district |
| Brockville | James Crawford (Cons); 690 | Fitzwilliam Henry Chambers; 521 | | Fitzwilliam Henry Chambers (Reformer) |
| Cornwall | John Sandfield Macdonald (Lib); 451 | Mattice; 295 | | John Sandfield Macdonald (Reformer) |
| Dundas | John Sylvester Ross (Lib-Cons) acclaimed | | | John Sylvester Ross (Cons) |
| Frontenac | Thomas Kirkpatrick (Cons); 1,242 | J. Carruthers; 693 | | William Ferguson (Cons) |
| Glengarry | Donald Alexander Macdonald (Lib) acclaimed | | | Donald Alexander Macdonald (Reformer) |
| Grenville South | Walter Shanly (Cons); 899 | William Patrick; 730 | | Walter Shanly (Lib-Cons); Grenville |
| Kingston | John A. Macdonald (Lib-Cons); 735 | John Stewart; 142 | | John A. Macdonald (Lib-Cons) |
| Leeds North and Grenville North | Francis Jones (Cons); 923 | G. Montgomery; 857 | | Francis Jones (Reformer); North Leeds and Grenville |
| Leeds South | John Willoughby Crawford (Cons); 1,393 | Albert Norton Richards; 1,364 | | Albert Norton Richards (Reformer) |
| Lennox | Richard John Cartwright (Cons); 1,268 | John Thomas Grange; 1,122 | | Richard John Cartwright (Cons); Lennox and Addington |
| Stormont | Samuel Ault (Lib-Cons); 955 | Sinclair; 363 | | Samuel Ault (Reformer) |

===== Central Ontario =====
| Electoral District | Candidates | | | Incumbent |
| Electoral District | Winner | Runner up | Other | Incumbent |
|---|---|---|---|---|
| Hastings East | Robert Read (Cons); 1,110 | J. J. Farley; 457 | | New district |
| Hastings North | Mackenzie Bowell (Cons); 928 | Thomas Campbell Wallbridge; 636 | McLean; 1 | Thomas Campbell Wallbridge (Reformer) |
| Hastings West | James Brown (Cons); 773 | Holden; 313 | | Lewis Wallbridge (Reformer); South Hastings |
| Northumberland East | Joseph Keeler (Lib-Cons); 1,607 | Kenneth McKenzie; 827 | Meyers; 0 | James Lyons Biggar (Reformer) |
| Northumberland West | James Cockburn (Cons) acclaimed | | | James Cockburn (Lib-Cons) |
| Peterborough East | Peregrine Maitland Grover (Cons); 956 | James Anderson; 644 | | Frederick W. Haultain (Cons); Peterborough |
| Peterborough West | Charles Perry (Cons); 681 | J. Gordon; 652 | | Frederick W. Haultain (Cons); Peterborough |
| Prince Edward | Walter Ross (Lib); 1,779 | James Simeon McCuaig (Cons); 942 | | Walter Ross (Reformer) |
| Victoria North | John Morison (Lib); 687 | Hector Cameron; 403 | | James Dunsford (Reformer); Victoria |
| Victoria South | George Kempt (Lib); 1,001 | Hector Cameron; 801 | | James Dunsford (Reformer); Victoria |

===== Greater Toronto Area =====
| Electoral District | Candidates | | | Incumbent |
| Electoral District | Winner | Runner up | Other | Incumbent |
|---|---|---|---|---|
| Durham East | Francis Henry Burton (Cons.); 1,134 | F. Beamish; 451 | | John Shuter Smith (Reformer) |
| Durham West | Edward Blake (Cons.); 1,337 | J. Milne; 931 | | Henry Munro (Reformer) |
| Halton | John White (Lib.); 1,422 | George King Chisholm; 1,289 | | John White (Reformer) |
| Ontario North | John Hall Thompson (Lib.); 1,628 | Matthew Crooks Cameron (Lib.); 1,362 | | Matthew Crooks Cameron (Cons.) |
| Ontario South | Thomas Nicholson Gibbs (Lib.-Cons.); 1,292 | George Brown; 1,223 | | Thomas Nicholson Gibbs (Reformer) |
| Peel | John Hillyard Cameron (Cons.); 1,138 | Wally Barber; 1,076 | | John Hillyard Cameron (Cons.) |
| Toronto East | James Beaty Sr. (Cons.); 1,113 | William Thomas Aikins; 980 | Allen; 1 | Alexander Mortimer Smith (Reformer) |
| Toronto West | Robert Alexander Harrison (Cons.); 1,477 | John Macdonald (Ind. Lib.); 1,048 | | John Macdonald (Reformer) |
| York East | James Metcalfe (Lib.); 1,174 | T. A. Milne; 937 | | Amos Wright (Reformer) |
| York North | James Pearson Wells (Lib.); Acclaimed | | | James Pearson Wells (Reformer) |
| York West | William Pearce Howland (Lib.-Cons.); 810 | J. S. Hubertus; 297 | David Blain; 0 | William Pearce Howland (Reformer) |

===== Georgian Bay =====
| Electoral District | Candidates | | | Incumbent |
| Electoral District | Winner | Runner up | Other | Incumbent |
|---|---|---|---|---|
| Algoma | Wemyss Mackenzie Simpson (Cons.); 250 | William Beatty; 241 | A. MacDonell; 38 | New district |
| Bruce North | Alexander Sproat (Cons); 862 | R. Douglas; 852 | | New district |
| Bruce South | Francis Hurdon (Cons); 1,777 | W. Rastall; 1,624 | Hall; 5 | New district |
| Cardwell | Thomas Roberts Ferguson (Cons); 1,155 | Philips; 1,078 | | New district |
| Grey North | George Snider (Lib); 1,399 | D'Arcy Boulton; 1,143 | | George Jackson (Cons); Grey |
| Grey South | George Jackson (Cons); 1,560 | R. Dalgleish; 1,547 | | George Jackson (Cons); Grey |
| Simcoe North | Thomas David McConkey (Lib); Acclaimed | | | Thomas David McConkey (Reformer) |
| Simcoe South | William Carruthers Little (Lib-Cons); 1,411 | Thomas Saunders; 1,055 | | Thomas Roberts Ferguson (Cons) |

===== Niagara Peninsula =====
| Electoral District | Candidates | | | Incumbent |
| Electoral District | Winner | Runner up | Other | Incumbent |
|---|---|---|---|---|
| Brant North | John Young Bown (Lib-Cons); 672 | J. D. Clement; 670 | | John Young Bown (Lib-Cons); East Brant |
| Brant South | Edmund Burke Wood (Lib); 1,257 | H. B. Leeming; 1,090 | | Edmund Burke Wood (Reformer); West Brant |
| Haldimand | David Thompson (Lib); 1,391 | R. McKinnon; 1,022 | | David Thompson (Reformer) |
| Hamilton | Charles Magill (Lib); Acclaimed | | | Charles Magill (Lib) |
| Lincoln | James Rea Benson (Lib-Cons); Acclaimed | | | William McGiverin (Reformer) |
| Monck | Lachlin McCallum (Lib-Cons); 1,126 | Fraser; 871 | | New district |
| Niagara | Angus Morrison (Cons); 300 | William Alexander Thomson; 250 | | Angus Morrison (Reformer); Niagara (town) |
| Norfolk North | Aquila Walsh (Cons); 1,026 | Duncombe; 990 | | Aquila Walsh (Cons); Norfolk |
| Norfolk South | Peter Lawson (Lib); 1,050 | N. O. Walker; 969 | | Aquila Walsh (Cons); Norfolk |
| Welland | Thomas Clark Street (Cons); Acclaimed | | | Thomas Clark Street (Cons) |
| Wentworth North | James McMonies (Lib); 1,154 | Alexander Brown; 1,093 | | James McMonies (Reform) |
| Wentworth South | Joseph Rymal (Lib); 1,015 | Thomas Robertson; 988 | | Joseph Rymal (Reform) |

===== Midwestern Ontario =====
| Electoral District | Candidates | | | Incumbent |
| Electoral District | Winner | Runner up | Other | Incumbent |
|---|---|---|---|---|
| Huron North | Joseph Whitehead (Lib); 1,940 | J. Holmes; 1,318 | Sloan; 675 | James Dickson (Reform); Huron & Bruce |
| Huron South | Malcolm Colin Cameron (Lib); 1,624 | G. H. Ritchie; 1,453 | D. L. Sills; 1 | James Dickson (Reform); Huron & Bruce |
| Oxford North | Thomas Oliver (Lib); Acclaimed | | | Thomas Oliver (Reformer) |
| Oxford South | Ebenezer Vining Bodwell (Lib); Acclaimed | | | George Brown (Reformer) |
| Perth North | James Redford (Lib); 1,515 | Thomas Mayne Daly Sr. (Lib-Cons); 1,307 | | Robert MacFarlane (Reform); Perth |
| Perth South | Robert MacFarlane (Lib); 1,490 | T. B. Guest; 1,393 | | Robert MacFarlane (Reform); Perth |
| Waterloo North | Isaac Erb Bowman (Lib); Acclaimed | | | Isaac Erb Bowman (Reformer) |
| Waterloo South | James Young (Lib); 1,324 | James Cowan; 958 | | James Cowan (Reformer) |
| Wellington Centre | Thomas Sutherland Parker (Lib); Acclaimed | | | Thomas Sutherland Parker (Reform); North Wellington |
| Wellington North | George Alexander Drew (Lib-Cons); 1,493 | Michael Hamilton Foley; 1,271 | | Thomas Sutherland Parker (Reform); North Wellington |
| Wellington South | David Stirton (Lib); 963 | F. W. Stone; 652 | | David Stirton (Reformer) |

===== Southwestern Ontario =====
| Electoral District | Candidates | | | Incumbent |
| Electoral District | Winner | Runner up | Other | Incumbent |
|---|---|---|---|---|
| Bothwell | David Mills (Lib); 1,333 | David Glass (Cons); 1,224 | | New district |
| Elgin East | Thomas William Dobbie (Cons); 1,492 | Leonidas Burwell; 1,382 | | Leonidas Burwell (Reformer) |
| Elgin West | John H. Munroe (Cons); 970 | C. McDougall; 766 | | John Scoble (Reformer) |
| Essex | John O'Connor (Cons); 1,439 | Arthur Rankin; 1,432 | | Arthur Rankin (Reformer) |
| Kent | Rufus Stephenson (Cons); 1,524 | Archibald McKellar; 1,427 | | Archibald McKellar (Reformer) |
| Lambton | Alexander Mackenzie (Lib); 1,999 | Alexander Vidal (Cons); 1,311 | | Alexander Mackenzie (Reformer) |
| London | John Carling (Lib-Cons); 1,114 | James Peacock; 266 | | John Carling (Lib-Cons) |
| Middlesex East | Crowell Willson (Lib-Cons); 1,896 | D. McFie; 1,756 | | Crowell Willson (Reformer) |
| Middlesex North | Thomas Scatcherd (Lib); 1,605 | Watson; 874 | | Thomas Scatcherd (Reformer); West Middlesex |
| Middlesex West | Angus Peter McDonald (Cons); 1,063 | G. Billington; 1,044 | | Thomas Scatcherd (Reformer); West Middlesex |

== See also ==
- List of elections in the Province of Canada
- 1st Canadian Parliament
