= 8th Parliament of the Province of Canada =

British colonial legislature from 1861 to 1867

The 8th Parliament of the Province of Canada was summoned in August 1863, following the general election for the Legislative Assembly in August 1863. The Parliament was abolished when the British North America Act, 1867 (now the Constitution Act, 1867) came into force on July 1, 1867, creating the new country of Canada.

The members were elected in a mixture of multi-member districts (four in East Canada, ten in West Canada), each electing two members, and single-member districts, using Block voting and first past the post respectively.

The Speaker of the Legislative Assembly was Lewis Wallbridge.

The first session of this Parliament sat from 13 August 1863 to 15 October 1863. Sessions were held in Quebec City until the fourth session 8 August 1865 to 18 September 1865.

The fifth and last session was held in Ottawa in the newly completed Parliament building 8 June 1866 to 15 August 1866. This was the last session of the Legislative Assembly of the Province of Canada. Following Confederation the following year, it was succeeded by the 1st Legislative Assembly of Ontario in Toronto, the 1st Quebec Legislature in Quebec City, and the 1st Canadian Parliament in Ottawa.

Most members went on to be elected to the Canadian House of Commons, while others served at provincial level either in Quebec or Ontario, were appointed to the Senate of Canada, as a provincial Lieutenant Governor or to another government post, or retired from politics altogether.

== Members ==
=== Canada East – 65 Seats ===
Riding	Member	Party	First elected/previously elected	No. of terms
Argenteuil	John Joseph Caldwell Abbott	Liberal	1860	3rd term
Bagot	Maurice Laframboise	Rouge	1857	3rd term
Beauce	Henri-Elzéar Taschereau	Bleu	1861	2nd term
Beauharnois	Paul Denis	Bleu	1861	2nd term
Bellechasse	Édouard Rémillard	Rouge	1861	2nd term
Berthier	Anselme-Homère Pâquet	Rouge	1863	1st term
Bonaventure	Théodore Robitaille	Bleu	1861	2nd term
Brome	Christopher Dunkin	Conservative	1857, (Note: Drummond—Arthabaska) 1862	3rd term*
Chambly	Charles-Eugène Boucher de Boucherville	Bleu	1861	2nd term
Champlain	John Jones Ross	Bleu	1861	2nd term
Charlevoix	Adolphe Gagnon	Rouge	1861	2nd term
Châteauguay	Luther Hamilton Holton	Rouge	1854, (Note: Montreal) 1863	2nd term*
Chicoutimi and Saguenay	David Edward Price (Note: resigned his seat in 1864 to run for a position in the Legislative Council; Pierre-Alexis Tremblay was elected in a by-election in January 1865.)	Conservative	1855	4th term
Chicoutimi and Saguenay	Pierre-Alexis Tremblay (1865)	Liberal	1865	1st term
Compton	John Henry Pope	Conservative	1857	3rd term
Deux-Montagnes	Jean-Baptiste Daoust	Reformer	1854	4th term
Dorchester	Hector-Louis Langevin	Bleu	1857	3rd term
Drummond and Arthabaska	Jean-Baptiste-Éric Dorion	Rouge	1854, 1861	3rd term*
Gaspé	John Le Boutillier	Bleu	1833, (Note: Gaspé) 1844, (Note: Bonaventure) 1854	7th term*
Hochelaga	Antoine-Aimé Dorion	Rouge	1854, (Note: Montreal) 1862	3rd term*
Huntingdon	Robert Brown Somerville	Independent	1854	4th term
Iberville	Alexandre Dufresne	Rouge	1861	2nd term
Jacques-Cartier	François-Zéphirin Tassé (Note: resigned his seat to accept the post of inspector of prisons; Guillaume Gamelin Gaucher was elected in a by-election in August 1864.)	Bleu	1857	3rd term
Jacques-Cartier	Guillaume Gamelin Gaucher (1864)	Bleu	1864	1st term
Joliette	Hippolite Cornellier	Bleu	1863	1st term
Kamouraska	Jean-Charles Chapais	Bleu	1851	5th term
Laprairie	Alfred Pinsonneault	Bleu	1863	1st term
L'Assomption	Louis Archambeault	Rouge	1857, 1863	2nd term*
Laval	Joseph-Hyacinthe Bellerose	Bleu	1863	1st term
Lévis	Joseph-Godric Blanchet	Bleu	1861	2nd term
L'Islet	Louis-Bonaventure Caron	Rouge	1857, 1863	2nd term*
Lotbinière	Henri-Gustave Joly de Lotbinière	Rouge	1861	2nd term
Maskinongé	Moïse Houde	Rouge	1863	1st term
Mégantic	George Irvine	Conservative	1863	1st term
Missisquoi	James O'Halloran	Rouge	1861	2nd term
Montcalm	Joseph Dufresne	Bleu	1854, 1862	3rd term*
Montmagny	Joseph-Octave Beaubien	Bleu	1857	3rd term
Montmorency	Joseph-Édouard Cauchon	Bleu	1844	7th term
Montreal Centre	John Rose	Conservative	1857	3rd term
Montreal East	George-Étienne Cartier	Bleu	1848	6th term
Montreal West	Thomas D'Arcy McGee	Conservative	1857	3rd term
Napierville	Sixte Coupal dit la Reine	Rouge	1863	1st term
Nicolet	Joseph Gaudet	Bleu	1857	3rd term
Ottawa County	Alonzo Wright	Conservative	1863	1st term
Pontiac	John Poupore	Bleu	1861	2nd term
Portneuf	Jean-Docile Brousseau	Liberal-Conservative	1861	2nd term
Quebec County	François Évanturel	Liberal	1861	2nd term
Quebec Centre	Isidore Thibaudeau	Rouge	1863	1st term
Quebec West	Charles Joseph Alleyn	Conservative	1857	3rd term
Quebec East	Pierre-Gabriel Huot	Rouge	1854, (Note: Saguenay) 1860	4th term*
Richelieu	Joseph-Xavier Perrault	Rouge	1863	1st term
Richmond and Wolfe	William Hoste Webb	Conservative	1857, 1863	2nd term*
Rimouski	George Sylvain	Bleu	1861	2nd term
Rouville	Joseph-Napoléon Poulin	Bleu	1851, 1863	3rd term*
St. Hyacinthe	Louis-Victor Sicotte (Note: accepted an appointment as a judge in 1863; Rémi Raymond was elected in a by-election in October 1863.)	Bleu	1851	5th term
St. Hyacinthe	Rémi Raymond (1863)	Bleu	1863	1st term
Saint-Jean	François Bourassa	Rouge	1854	4th term
Saint-Maurice	Charles Gérin-Lajoie	Rouge	1863	1st term
Shefford	Lucius Seth Huntington	Rouge	1861	2nd term
Sherbrooke	Alexander Tilloch Galt	Liberal-Conservative	1849, 1853	6th term*
Soulanges	William Duckett	Conservative	1863	1st term
Stanstead	Albert Knight	Conservative	1861	2nd term
Témiscouata	Jean-Baptiste Pouliot	Rouge	1863	1st term
Terrebonne	Louis Labrèche-Viger	Rouge	1861	2nd term
Trois-Rivières	Joseph-Édouard Turcotte (Note: died in December 1864; Louis-Charles Boucher de Niverville was elected in a by-election in January 1865.)	Bleu	1841, (Note: Saint-Maurice) 1851	7th term*
Trois-Rivières	Louis-Charles Boucher de Niverville (1865)	Bleu	1865	1st term
Vaudreuil	Antoine Chartier de Lotbinière Harwood	Conservative	1863	1st term
Verchères	Félix Geoffrion	Rouge	1863	1st term
Yamaska	Moïse Fortier	Rouge	1861	2nd term

=== Canada West – 65 Seats ===
Riding	Member	Party	First elected/previously elected	No. of terms
East Brant	John Young Bown	Liberal-Conservative	1861	2nd term
West Brant	Edmund Burke Wood	Reformer	1863	1st term
Brockville	Fitzwilliam Henry Chambers	Reformer	1863	1st term
Carleton	William F. Powell	Conservative	1854	4th term
Cornwall	John Sandfield Macdonald	Reformer	1841	8th term
Dundas	John Sylvester Ross	Conservative	1861	2nd term
East Durham	John Shuter Smith	Reformer	1861	2nd term
West Durham	Henry Munro	Reformer	1854	4th term
East Elgin	Leonidas Burwell	Reformer	1857	3rd term
West Elgin	John Scoble	Reformer	1863	2nd term
Essex	Arthur Rankin	Reformer	1854, 1861, 1863	3rd term*
Frontenac	William Ferguson	Conservative	1863	1st term
Glengarry	Donald Alexander Macdonald	Reformer	1857	3rd term
Grenville	Walter Shanly	Liberal-Conservative	1863	1st term
Grey	George Jackson	Conservative	1854, 1861	3rd term*
Haldimand	David Thompson	Reformer	1863	1st term
Halton	John White	Reformer	1851, 1857	4th term*
Hamilton	Isaac Buchanan (Note: resigned in 1865; Charles Magill was elected in a by-election in 1866.)	Conservative	1841, 1857	4th term*
Hamilton	Charles Magill (1866)	Liberal	1866	1st term
North Hastings	Thomas Campbell Wallbridge	Reformer	1863	1st term
South Hastings	Lewis Wallbridge	Reformer	1857	3rd term
Huron and Bruce	James Dickson	Reformer	1861	2nd term
Kent	Archibald McKellar	Reformer	1857	3rd term
Kingston	John A. Macdonald	Liberal-Conservative	1844	7th term
Lambton	Alexander Mackenzie	Reformer	1861	2nd term
North Lanark	Robert Bell (Note: resigned his seat to allow William McDougall to be elected in November 1864.)	Reformer	1854	4th term
North Lanark	William McDougall (1864)	Reformer	1857, 1864	2nd term*
South Lanark	Alexander Morris	Conservative	1861	2nd term
North Leeds and Grenville	Francis Jones	Reformer	1861	2nd term
South Leeds	Albert Norton Richards (Note: appointed Solicitor-General for Canada West; David Ford Jones was elected in a by-election in January 1864.)	Reformer	1863	1st term
South Leeds	David Ford Jones (1864)	Liberal-Conservative	1864	1st term
Lennox and Addington	Richard John Cartwright	Conservative	1863	1st term
Lincoln	William McGiverin	Reformer	1863	1st term
London	John Carling	Liberal-Conservative	1857	3rd term
East Middlesex	Crowell Willson	Reformer	1851, 1863	2nd term*
West Middlesex	Thomas Scatcherd	Reformer	1854, 1861	3rd term*
Niagara	John Simpson (Note: resigned in 1864; Angus Morrison was elected in a by-election in September 1864.)	Conservative	1857	3rd term
Niagara	Angus Morrison (1864)	Reformer	1854, (Note: North Simcoe) 1864	4th term*
Norfolk	Aquila Walsh	Conservative	1861	2nd term
East Northumberland	James Lyons Biggar	Reformer	1861	2nd term
West Northumberland	James Cockburn	Liberal-Conservative	1861	2nd term
North Ontario	William McDougall (Note: accepted an appointment to cabinet and was defeated by Matthew Crooks Cameron in a by-election in July 1864.)	Reformer	1857, (Note: North Lanark) 1864	2nd term*
North Ontario	Matthew Crooks Cameron (1864)	Conservative	1861, 1864	2nd term*
South Ontario	Oliver Mowat (Note: received an appointment; Thomas Nicholson Gibbs was elected to the seat in a by-election in 1864.)	Reformer	1857	3rd term
South Ontario	Thomas Nicholson Gibbs (1864)	Reformer	1864	1st term
City of Ottawa	Joseph Merrill Currier	Conservative	1863	1st term
North Oxford	Hope Fleming Mackenzie (Note: died in 1866; Thomas Oliver was elected in a by-election in the same year.)	Reformer	1860, (Note: Lambton) 1863	2nd term*
North Oxford	Thomas Oliver (1866)	Reformer	1866	1st term
South Oxford	George Brown	Reformer	1851, (Note: Kent/Lambton/Toronto) 1863	5th term*
Peel	John Hillyard Cameron	Conservative	1854	4th term
Perth	Robert MacFarlane	Reformer	1863	1st term
Peterborough	Wilson Seymour Conger (Note: died in 1864; Frederick W. Haultain was elected to the seat in a by-election in the same year.)	Independent	1856, 1863	2nd term*
Peterborough	Frederick W. Haultain (1864)	Conservative	1861, 1864	2nd term*
Prescott	Thomas Higginson	Conservative	1863	1st term
Prince Edward	Walter Ross	Reformer	1863	1st term
Renfrew	Robert McIntyre	Reformer	1863	1st term
Russell	Robert Bell	Conservative	1861	2nd term
North Simcoe	Thomas David McConkey	Reformer	1863	1st term
South Simcoe	Thomas Roberts Ferguson	Conservative	1857	3rd term
Stormont	Samuel Ault	Reformer	1861	2nd term
East Toronto	Alexander Mortimer Smith	Reformer	1863	1st term
West Toronto	John Macdonald	Reformer	1863	1st term
Victoria	James W Dunsford	Reformer	1861	2nd term
North Waterloo	Michael Hamilton Foley (Note: was forced to seek reelection due to an appointment; Isaac Erb Bowman was elected in a by-election in April 1864.)	Reformer	1854	4th term
North Waterloo	Isaac Erb Bowman (1864)	Reformer	1864	1st term
South Waterloo	James Cowan	Reformer	1861	2nd term
Welland	Thomas Clark Street	Conservative	1861	2nd term
North Wellington	Thomas Sutherland Parker	Reformer	1863	1st term
South Wellington	David Stirton	Reformer	1857	3rd term
North Wentworth	William Notman	Reformer	1848, (Note: Middlesex) 1857	4th term*
North Wentworth	James McMonies (1865)	Reformer	1865	1st term
South Wentworth	Joseph Rymal	Reformer	1857	3rd term
East York	Amos Wright	Reformer	1851	5th term
North York	James Pearson Wells	Reformer	1863	1st term
West York	William Pearce Howland	Reformer	1857	3rd term
