= 7th Parliament of the Province of Canada =

British colonial legislature from 1861 to 1863

The 7th Parliament of the Province of Canada was summoned in July 1861, following the general election for the Legislative Assembly in June 1861. It first met on July 15, 1861, and was dissolved in May 1863.

This was the first election in the Province of Canada to use a list of eligible voters prepared before the election. All sessions were held in Quebec City. The 7th Parliament ended following a vote of no confidence on May 8, 1863.

The Speaker of the Legislative Assembly was Joseph-Édouard Turcotte.

== Members ==
=== Canada East – 65 Seats ===
Riding	Member	Party	First elected/previously elected	No. of terms
Argenteuil	John Joseph Caldwell Abbott	Liberal	1860	2nd term
Bagot	Maurice Laframboise	Rouge	1857	2nd term
Beauce	Henri-Elzéar Taschereau	Bleu	1861	1st term
Beauharnois	Paul Denis	Bleu	1861	1st term
Bellechasse	Édouard Rémillard	Rouge	1861	1st term
Berthier	Pierre-Eustache Dostaler	Bleu	1854, 1861	2nd term*
Bonaventure	Théodore Robitaille	Bleu	1861	1st term
Brome	Moses Sweet (Note: resigned his seat to accept a post in 1862; Christopher Dunkin was elected in a by-election in March 1862.)	Liberal-Conservative	1861	1st term
Brome	Christopher Dunkin (1862)	Conservative	1857, (Note: Drummond—Arthabaska) 1862	2nd term*
Chambly	Charles-Eugène Boucher de Boucherville	Bleu	1861	1st term
Champlain	John Jones Ross	Bleu	1861	1st term
Charlevoix	Adolphe Gagnon	Rouge	1861	1st term
Châteauguay	Henry Starnes	Conservative	1857	2nd term
Chicoutimi—Saguenay	David Edward Price	Conservative	1855	3rd term
Compton	John Henry Pope	Conservative	1857	2nd term
Deux-Montagnes	Jean-Baptiste Daoust	Reformer	1854	3rd term
Dorchester	Hector-Louis Langevin	Bleu	1857	2nd term
Drummond—Arthabaska	Jean-Baptiste-Éric Dorion	Rouge	1854, 1861	2nd term*
Gaspé	John Le Boutillier	Bleu	1833, (Note: Gaspé) 1844, (Note: Bonaventure) 1854	6th term*
Hochelaga	Paschal Falkner (Note: gave up his seat to allow Antoine-Aimé Dorion to be elected in a by-election in June 1862.)	Rouge	1861	1st term
Hochelaga	Antoine-Aimé Dorion (1862)	Rouge	1854, (Note: Montreal) 1862	2nd term*
Huntingdon	Robert Brown Somerville	Independent	1854	3rd term
Iberville	Alexandre Dufresne	Rouge	1861	1st term
Jacques-Cartier	François-Zéphirin Tassé	Bleu	1857	2nd term
Joliette	Joseph-Hilarion Jobin	Rouge	1851	4th term
Kamouraska	Jean-Charles Chapais	Bleu	1851	4th term
Laprairie	Thomas-Jean-Jacques Loranger (Note: was appointed judge in 1863; Alfred Pinsonneault was elected in a by-election in April 1863.)	Independent	1857	2nd term
Laprairie	Alfred Pinsonneault (1863)	Bleu	1863	1st term
L'Assomption	Alexandre Archambault	Rouge	1857	2nd term
Laval	Pierre Labelle (Note: resigned his seat to accept an appointment as superintendent of Public Works; Louis-Siméon Morin was elected in a by-election in September 1861.)	Bleu	1854	3rd term
Laval	Louis-Siméon Morin (1861)	Bleu	1861	1st term
Lévis	Joseph-Godric Blanchet	Bleu	1861	1st term
L'Islet	Charles-François Fournier	Bleu	1848, 1857	5th term*
Lotbinière	Henri-Gustave Joly de Lotbinière	Rouge	1861	1st term
Maskinongé	George Caron	Bleu	1857	2nd term
Mégantic	Noël Hébert	Rouge	1857	2nd term
Missisquoi	James O'Halloran	Rouge	1861	1st term
Montcalm	Jean-Louis Martin (Note: died in 1861 without taking his seat; Joseph Dufresne was elected to the seat in a by-election in February 1862.)	Independent	1861	1st term
Montcalm	Joseph Dufresne (1862)	Bleu	1854, 1862	2nd term*
Montmagny	Joseph-Octave Beaubien	Bleu	1857	2nd term
Montmorency	Joseph-Édouard Cauchon	Bleu	1844	6th term
Montreal Centre	John Rose	Conservative	1857	2nd term
Montreal East	George-Étienne Cartier	Bleu	1848	5th term
Montreal West	Thomas D'Arcy McGee	Rouge	1857	2nd term
Napierville	Jacques-Olivier Bureau (Note: resigned November 1862 when elected to represent Lorimier in Legislative Council.)	Rouge	1854	3rd term
Napierville	Pierre Benoit (1862)	Rouge	1862	1st term
Nicolet	Joseph Gaudet	Bleu	1857	2nd term
Ottawa County	William McDonell Dawson	Conservative	1857	2nd term
Pontiac	John Poupore	Bleu	1861	1st term
Portneuf	Jean-Docile Brousseau	Liberal-Conservative	1861	1st term
Quebec County	François Évanturel	Liberal	1855, 1861	2nd term*
Quebec-Centre	Georges-Honoré Simard	Bleu	1856	3rd term
Quebec West	Charles Joseph Alleyn	Conservative	1857	2nd term
Quebec East	Pierre-Gabriel Huot	Rouge	1854, (Note: Saguenay) 1860	3rd term*
Richelieu	Joseph Beaudreau	Bleu	1861	1st term
Richmond—Wolfe	Charles de Cazes	Independent	1861	1st term
Rimouski	George Sylvain	Liberal	1861	1st term
Rouville	Lewis Thomas Drummond	Rouge	1844, (Note: Montreal/Portneuf/Shefford) 1858	6th term*
St. Hyacinthe	Louis-Victor Sicotte	Bleu	1851	4th term
Saint-Jean	François Bourassa	Rouge	1854	3rd term
Saint-Maurice	Louis-Léon Lesieur Desaulniers	Bleu	1854	3rd term
Shefford	Lucius Seth Huntington	Rouge	1860	2nd term
Sherbrooke	Alexander Tilloch Galt	Liberal-Conservative	1849, 1853	5th term*
Soulanges	Jean-Baptiste-Jules Prévost	Moderate	1861	1st term
Stanstead	Albert Knight	Conservative	1861	1st term
Témiscouata	Michel-Guillaume Baby	Bleu	1857	2nd term
Terrebonne	Louis Labrèche-Viger	Rouge	1861	1st term
Trois-Rivières	Joseph-Édouard Turcotte	Bleu	1841, (Note: Saint-Maurice) 1851	6th term*
Vaudreuil	Jean-Baptiste Mongenais	Bleu	1848, 1860	5th term*
Verchères	Alexandre-Édouard Kierzkowski (Note: election was declared invalid; Charles-François Painchaud was awarded the seat in May 1863.)	Rouge	1861	1st term
Verchères	Charles-François Painchaud (1863)	Independent	1863	1st term
Yamaska	Moïse Fortier	Rouge	1861	1st term

=== Canada West – 65 Seats ===
Riding	Member	Party	First elected/previously elected	No. of terms
East Brant	John Young Bown	Reformer	1861	1st term
West Brant	William Ryerson	Independent	1861	1st term
Brockville	George Sherwood	Conservative	1841, 1857	5th term*
Carleton	William F. Powell	Conservative	1854	3rd term
Cornwall	John Sandfield Macdonald	Reformer	1841	7th term
Dundas	John Sylvester Ross	Conservative	1861	1st term
East Durham	John Shuter Smith	Reformer	1861	1st term
West Durham	Henry Munro	Reformer	1854	3rd term
East Elgin	Leonidas Burwell	Reformer	1857	2nd term
West Elgin	George Macbeth (Note: unseated in February 1863; John Scoble was awarded the seat.)	Conservative	1854	3rd term
West Elgin	John Scoble (1863)	Reformer	1863	1st term
Essex	Arthur Rankin (Note: election declared invalid in March 1863; John O'Connor was declared elected.)	Reformer	1854, 1861	2nd term*
Essex	John O'Connor (1863)	Conservative	1863	1st term
Frontenac	James Morton	Conservative	1861	1st term
Glengarry	Donald Alexander Macdonald	Reformer	1857	2nd term
Grenville	William Patrick	Reformer	1851	4th term
Grey	George Jackson	Conservative	1854, 1861	2nd term*
Haldimand	Michael Harcourt	Reformer	1857	2nd term
Halton	John White	Reformer	1851, 1857	3rd term*
Hamilton	Isaac Buchanan	Independent	1841, 1857	3rd term*
North Hastings	George Benjamin	Conservative	1856	3rd term
South Hastings	Lewis Wallbridge	Reformer	1857	2nd term
Huron & Bruce	James Dickson	Reformer	1861	1st term
Kent	Archibald McKellar	Reformer	1857	2nd term
Kingston	John A. Macdonald	Liberal-Conservative	1844	6th term
Lambton	Alexander Mackenzie	Reformer	1861	1st term
North Lanark	Robert Bell	Reformer	1854	3rd term
South Lanark	Alexander Morris	Conservative	1861	1st term
North Leeds & Grenville	Francis Jones	Conservative	1861	1st term
South Leeds	Benjamin Tett	Conservative	1857	2nd term
Lennox and Addington	Augustus Frederick Garland Hooper	Conservative	1861	1st term
Lincoln	John Charles Rykert	Liberal-Conservative	1860	2nd term
London	John Carling	Liberal-Conservative	1857	2nd term
East Middlesex	Maurice Berkeley Portman	Conservative	1861	1st term
West Middlesex	Thomas Scatcherd	Reformer	1854, 1861	2nd term*
Niagara (town)	John Simpson	Conservative	1857	2nd term
Norfolk	Aquila Walsh	Conservative	1861	1st term
East Northumberland	James Lyons Biggar	Reformer	1861	1st term
West Northumberland	James Cockburn	Conservative	1861	1st term
North Ontario	Matthew Crooks Cameron	Conservative	1861	1st term
South Ontario	Oliver Mowat	Reformer	1857	2nd term
Ottawa	Richard William Scott	Liberal-Conservative	1857	2nd term
North Oxford	William McDougall	Reformer	1857	2nd term
South Oxford	George Skeffington Connor (Note: resigned to accept an appointment as judge in 1863; George Brown was elected in a by-election in March 1863.)	Reformer	1857	2nd term
South Oxford	George Brown (1863)	Reformer	1851, (Note: Kent/Lambton/Toronto) 1863	4th term*
Peel	John Hillyard Cameron	Conservative	1846, (Note: Cornwall) 1854, (Note: Toronto) 1861	4th term*
Perth	Michael Hamilton Foley (Note: elected in both Perth & North Waterloo; Foley chose the Perth seat; when he was appointed to cabinet, he was forced to seek re-election and was elected in Waterloo North; Thomas Mayne Daly was elected in Perth in a by-election in 1862.)	Reformer	1854	3rd term
Perth	Thomas Mayne Daly (1862)	Liberal-Conservative	1854, 1862	2nd term*
Peterborough	Frederick W. Haultain	Conservative	1861	1st term
Prescott	Henry Wellesly McCann	Conservative	1854	3rd term
Prince Edward	William Anderson	Conservative	1861	1st term
Renfrew	Daniel McLachlin	Liberal-Conservative	1851, (Note: Bytown) 1861	2nd term*
Russell	Robert Bell	Conservative	1861	1st term
North Simcoe	Angus Morrison	Reformer	1854	3rd term
South Simcoe	Thomas Roberts Ferguson	Conservative	1857	2nd term
Stormont	Samuel Ault	Reformer	1861	1st term
East Toronto	John Willoughby Crawford	Conservative	1861	1st term
West Toronto	John Beverley Robinson	Conservative	1857	2nd term
Victoria	James W Dunsford	Liberal-Conservative	1861	1st term
North Waterloo	Michael Hamilton Foley	Reform	1854	3rd term
South Waterloo	James Cowan	Reform	1861	1st term
Welland	Thomas Clark Street	Conservative	1851, 1861	2nd term*
North Wellington	William Clarke	Conservative	1854, 1861	2nd term*
South Wellington	David Stirton	Reformer	1857	2nd term
North Wentworth	William Notman	Reformer	1848, (Note: Middlesex) 1857	3rd term*
South Wentworth	Joseph Rymal	Reformer	1857	2nd term
East York	Amos Wright	Reformer	1851	4th term
North York	Adam Wilson	Reformer	1860	2nd term
West York	William Pearce Howland	Reformer	1857	2nd term
