= 23rd General Assembly of Nova Scotia =

The 23rd General Assembly of Nova Scotia represented Nova Scotia between 1864 and 1867.

The assembly sat at the pleasure of the Lieutenant-Governor of Nova Scotia, Charles Hastings Doyle. Richard Graves MacDonnell was governor for Nova Scotia from May 1864 to October 1865. William Fenwick Williams served as governor from 1865 to 1867.

John C. Wade was chosen as speaker for the house.

The assembly was dissolved on June 10, 1867.

== List of Members ==
Electoral District		Name	Party	First elected / previously elected
Annapolis County		J.W. Johnston (Note: named judge)	Conservative	1843
Annapolis County		William Hallett Ray (1865)	Liberal	1865
Annapolis County		Avard Longley	Confederation	1859
Annapolis County		George Whitman	Conservative	1863
Antigonish County		W. A. Henry	Conservative	1847
Antigonish County		John McKinnon	Conservative	1851
Cape Breton County		Thomas Caldwell	Conservative	1856
Cape Breton County		John George Bourinot	Conservative	1859
Colchester County	North Division	A.W. McLellan	Anti-Confederation	1858
Colchester County	North Division	William Blackwood	Liberal	1863
Colchester County	South Division	Adams G. Archibald	Conservative	1851
Colchester County	South Division	Francis R. Parker	Liberal	1863
Cumberland County		Charles Tupper	Conservative	1855
Cumberland County		Alexander McFarlane	Conservative	1855
Cumberland County		Robert Donkin	Conservative	1861
Digby County		John C. Wade	Confederation	1851
Digby County		Mathurin Robicheau	Confederation	1855
Digby County		Colin Campbell	Liberal	1859
Guysborough County		William O. Heffernan	Liberal	1859
Guysborough County		Stewart Campbell	Liberal	1851
Halifax County	Western Division	John Tobin	Conservative	1855 (Note: First elected as Liberal/Reformer)
Halifax County	Western Division	Samuel Leonard Shannon	Confederation	1859
Halifax County	Western Division	Henry Pryor	Conservative	1859
Halifax County	Eastern Division	William Annand	Liberal	1836, 1851
Halifax County	Eastern Division	Henry Balcom	Liberal	1863
Hants County	North Division	Ezra Churchill	Conservative	1855
Hants County	North Division	William Dawson Lawrence	Conservative	1863
Hants County	South Division	James W. King	Conservative	1863
Hants County	South Division	Lewis W. Hill	Conservative	1863
Inverness County		Hiram Blanchard	Conservative	1859
Inverness County		Peter Smyth	Conservative	1847
Inverness County		Samuel McDonnell	Conservative	1863
Kings County	North Division	Charles C. Hamilton	Conservative	1863
Kings County	North Division	Caleb R. Bill	Conservative	1863
Kings County	South Division	Daniel Moore	Conservative	1861
Kings County	South Division	Edward L. Brown	Conservative	1863
Lunenburg County		Henry S. Jost	Conservative	1863
Lunenburg County		Henry A.N. Kaulback	Confederation	1863
Lunenburg County		William Slocumb (Note: died in 1865)	Conservative	1863
Lunenburg County		Abraham Hebb (1865)	Liberal	1865
Pictou County	East Division	James Fraser	Conservative	1863
Pictou County	East Division	James McDonald	Conservative	1859
Pictou County	West Division	Donald Fraser	Conservative	1863
Pictou County	West Division	Alexander MacKay	Confederation	1863
Queens County	John Campbell		Conservative	1845
Queens County	South District	Andrew Cowie	Confederation	1851, 1859
Queens County	North District	Charles Allison	Confederation	1863
Richmond County		Isaac LeVesconte	Conservative	1863
Richmond County		Isaac LeVesconte	Anti-Confederation	1863
Richmond County		William Miller	Liberal	1863
Shelburne County	Thomas Coffin		Anti-Confederation	1851, 1859
Shelburne County	Township of Barrington	Robert Robertson	Anti-Confederation	1855
Shelburne County	Township of Shelburne	John Locke	Liberal	1851
Victoria County		William Ross	Anti-Confederation	1859
Victoria County		Charles James Campbell	Conservative	1855, 1860
Yarmouth County	Thomas Killam		Conservative	1847
Yarmouth County	Thomas Killam		Liberal	1847
Yarmouth County	Township of Argyle	Isaac Hatfield	Conservative	1863
Township of Yarmouth		George Stayley Brown	Liberal	1863
Township of Yarmouth		William H. Townsend (1866)	Anti-Confederation	1859, 1866

== Notes ==
Preceded by 22nd General Assembly of Nova Scotia	General Assemblies of Nova Scotia; 1864–1867	Succeeded by 24th General Assembly of Nova Scotia
