= 22nd General Assembly of Nova Scotia =

The 22nd General Assembly of Nova Scotia represented Nova Scotia between 1859 and 1863.

The assembly sat at the pleasure of the Governor of Nova Scotia, George Augustus Constantine Phipps.

Stewart Campbell was chosen as speaker for the house.

The 22nd General Assembly was actually the 21st assembly of the province, and earned its name due to an error. According to the 1983 revised edition of The Legislative Assembly of Nova Scotia 1758 -1983 : a biographical directory:

It should be pointed out, however, that an error in numbering the Journals [of the Nova Scotia House of Assembly] occurred in 1860, when the 21st Assembly was mistakenly referred to as the 22nd Assembly. Although the error was corrected in 1864, it reappeared the following year and has since been perpetuated. Consequently, to be strictly accurate, the present Assembly [convened in 1982] should be regarded as the 52nd, rather than the 53rd Assembly of the Province.

== List of Members ==
| Electoral District | | Name | Party | First elected / previously elected |
|---|---|---|---|---|
| Annapolis County | | J.W. Johnston | Conservative | 1843 |
| Annapolis County | | Moses Shaw | Liberal | 1858 |
| Annapolis County | | Avard Longley | Conservative | 1859 |
| Cape Breton County | | Thomas Caldwell | Conservative | 1856 |
| Cape Breton County | | John George Bourinot | Conservative | 1859 |
| Colchester | North Division | A.W. McLellan | Liberal | 1858 |
| Colchester | North Division | Thomas F. Morrison | Liberal | 1859 |
| Colchester | South Division | Adams G. Archibald | Conservative | 1851 |
| Colchester | South Division | Alexander Campbell | Liberal | 1859 |
| Cumberland County | | William Young (Note: named judge) | Liberal | 1840 |
| Cumberland County | | Robert Donkin (1861) | Conservative | 1861 |
| Cumberland County | | Charles Tupper | Conservative | 1855 |
| Cumberland County | | Alexander McFarlane | Conservative | 1855 |
| Digby County | | John C. Wade | Liberal | 1851 |
| Digby County | | Mathurin Robicheau | Liberal | 1855 |
| Digby County | | Colin Campbell | Conservative | 1859 |
| Guysborough County | | Stewart Campbell | Conservative | 1851 |
| Guysborough County | | William O. Heffernan | Liberal | 1859 |
| Halifax County | Western Division | John Tobin | Conservative | 1855 (Note: First elected as Liberal/Reformer) |
| Halifax County | Western Division | Henry Pryor | Conservative | 1859 |
| Halifax County | Western Division | Samuel Leonard Shannon | Conservative | 1859 |
| Halifax County | Eastern Division | John Esson | Liberal | 1851 |
| Halifax County | Eastern Division | William Annand | Liberal | 1836, 1851 |
| Hants County | North Division | Ezra Churchill | Conservative | 1855 |
| Hants County | North Division | Arthur McNutt Cochran | Liberal | 1859 |
| Hants County | South Division | Joseph Howe | Liberal | 1836 (Note: Halifax County/Cumberland County) 1856 |
| Hants County | South Division | William Chambers | Liberal | 1855 |
| Inverness County | | Peter Smyth | Conservative | 1847 |
| Inverness County | | Hugh McDonald | Liberal | 1859 |
| Inverness County | | Hiram Blanchard | Conservative | 1859 |
| Kings County | North Division | William Burgess | Liberal | 1859 |
| Kings County | North Division | Samuel Chipman | Liberal | 1830, (Note: King's County) 1851 |
| Kings County | South Division | John L. Brown | Liberal | 1859 |
| Kings County | South Division | William B. Webster (Note: died in 1861) | Liberal | 1855 |
| Kings County | South Division | Daniel Moore (1861) | Conservative | 1861 |
| Lunenburg County | | Henry Bailey | Liberal | 1859 |
| Lunenburg County | | Benjamin Wier | Liberal | 1851 |
| Lunenburg County | | Henry Moseley | Liberal | 1859 |
| Pictou County | Western Division | Alexander C. McDonald | Liberal | 1855 |
| Pictou County | Western Division | Robert P. Grant | Liberal | 1859 |
| Pictou County | Eastern Division | George McKenzie | Liberal | 1859 |
| Pictou County | Eastern Division | James McDonald | Conservative | 1859 |
| Queens County | John Campbell | | Conservative | 1845 |
| Queens County | South District | Lewis Smith | Liberal | 1859 |
| Queens County | North District | Andrew Cowie | Conservative | 1851, 1859 |
| Richmond County | | Charles F. Harrington | Conservative | 1847, 1859 |
| Richmond County | | Henry Martell | Conservative | 1840 |
| Shelburne County | Thomas Coffin | | Liberal | 1851, 1859 |
| Shelburne County | Township of Barrington | Robert Robertson | Liberal | 1855 |
| Shelburne County | Township of Shelburne | John Locke | Liberal | 1851 |
| Sydney County | | W. A. Henry | Conservative | 1847 |
| Sydney County | | John McKinnon | Conservative | 1851 |
| Victoria County | | Hugh Munro (Note: appointed chairman of the Board of Works) | Liberal | 1851 |
| Victoria County | | Charles J. Campbell (1860) | Conservative | 1855, 1860 |
| Victoria County | | William Ross | Liberal | 1859 |
| Victoria County | | William Gammell (1861) | Liberal | 1861 |
| Yarmouth County | Thomas Killam | | Liberal | 1847 |
| Yarmouth County | Township of Argyle | John V.N. Hatfield | Conservative | 1859 |
| Yarmouth County | Township of Yarmouth | William H. Townsend | Conservative | 1859 |

== Notes ==
| Preceded by 20th General Assembly of Nova Scotia | General Assemblies of Nova Scotia; 1859–1863 | Succeeded by 23rd General Assembly of Nova Scotia |
