= 21st New Brunswick Legislature =

The 21st New Brunswick Legislative Assembly represented New Brunswick between June 21, 1866, and June 3, 1870.

The assembly sat at the pleasure of the Governor of New Brunswick Arthur Charles Hamilton-Gordon. Charles Hastings Doyle became Lieutenant Governor of New Brunswick in 1867 following Confederation. He was succeeded by Francis Pym Harding in October 1867 and then Lemuel Allan Wilmot in July 1868.

The speaker was selected as John H. Gray. From 1867 to 1870, Bliss Botsford held the position of speaker.

The Confederation Party led by Peter Mitchell formed the government; Mitchell was a member of the province's Legislative Council. Andrew R. Wetmore became leader after Mitchell was named to the Canadian senate.

== Members ==
Electoral District	Name	Party	First elected / previously elected
Albert	Abner R. McClelan (Note: named to the Senate of Canada)	Independent	1854
Albert	John Lewis (Note: named to Legislative Council)	Independent	1856, 1865
Albert	Amos Atkinson Bliss (1867)	Conservative	1867
Carleton	Charles Connell (Note: elected to federal seat) (Note: died in 1868)	Independent	1846, 1864
Carleton	William Lindsay	Liberal	1861
Carleton	James Hartley (1867)	Independent	1867
Carleton	George W. White (1868)	Conservative	1868
Charlotte	John McAdam	Conservative	1854, 1864, 1866
Charlotte	James G. Stevens (Note: resigned seat after being named a judge)	Independent	1866
Charlotte	Francis Hibbard	Independent	1866
Charlotte	James W. Chandler	Independent	1857, 1866
Charlotte	Benjamin Robert Stephenson (1867)	Liberal	1867
Charlotte	Henry Frye (1867)	Independent	1867
Charlotte	John S. Covert (1868)	Independent	1868
Gloucester	Robert Young	Independent	1861
Gloucester	John Meahan	Independent	1861
Kent	William S. Caie	Independent	1865
Kent	Owen McInerney	Independent	1866
Kent	Urbain Johnson (1869)	Liberal	1869
Kings	George Ryan	Independent	1850, 1861, 1866
Kings	William P. Flewelling	Independent	1866
Kings	John Flewelling	Independent	1866
Kings	Gideon McLeod (1867)	Independent	1867
Northumberland	John M. Johnson	Independent	1850, 1866
Northumberland	Edward Williston	Independent	1861
Northumberland	Richard Sutton	Independent	1854, 1865
Northumberland	George Kerr	Conservative	1852
Northumberland	William Moore Kelly (1867)	Independent	1867
Northumberland	Jacob C. Gough (1867)	Conservative	1867
Queens	John Ferris	Liberal	1854, 1866
Queens	Robert Thorne Babbit	Independent	1866
Queens	Walter S. Butler (1867)	Independent	1867
Restigouche	John McMillan	Independent	1857
Restigouche	Alexander C. DesBrisay	Independent	1865
Restigouche	William Montgomery (1867)	Independent	1867
Saint John City	Samuel Leonard Tilley	Conservative	1850, 1854, 1857, 1866
Saint John City	Andrew R. Wetmore	Conservative	1865
Saint John City	William Keans (1867)	Independent	1867
Saint John County	Charles N. Skinner	Liberal	1861, 1866
Saint John County	John H. Gray	Conservative	1850, 1866
Saint John County	Robert D. Wilmot	Conservative	1850, 1865
Saint John County	James Quinton	Independent	1866
Saint John County	Joseph Coram (1867)	Independent	1865, 1867
Saint John County	John Waterbury Cudlip (1867)	Independent	1857, 1867
Saint John County	George Edwin King (1867)	Conservative	1867
Sunbury	John Glasier	Liberal	1861
Sunbury	William E. Perley	Conservative	1856
Sunbury	John S. Covert (1868)	Liberal	1868
Victoria	Benjamin Beveridge	Independent	1863
Victoria	Vital Hébert (Note: died in 1867)	Independent	1866
Victoria	Lévite Thériault (1868)	Liberal	1868
Victoria	Charles A. Hammond (1868)	Independent	1868
Westmorland	Albert J. Smith	Liberal	1854
Westmorland	Bliss Botsford	Independent	1850, 1856, 1865
Westmorland	Angus McQueen	Independent	1866
Westmorland	Amand Landry	Independent	1846, 1853, 1861
Westmorland	Joseph Lytle Moore (1867)	Independent	1867
York	Hiram Dow	Independent	1861, 1866
York	Charles Fisher	Liberal	1854, 1865
York	Alexander Thompson	Independent	1866
York	John A. Beckwith	Conservative	1866
York	William Hayden Needham (1868)	Independent	1850, (Note: Saint John City) 1865, 1868
York	John Pickard (1867)	Independent	1867

== Notes ==
Preceded by 20th New Brunswick Legislature	Legislative Assemblies of New Brunswick; 1866–1870	Succeeded by 22nd New Brunswick Legislature
