= 22nd Nova Scotia general election =

22nd Nova Scotia general election may refer to:

- Nova Scotia general election, 1859, the 21st general election to take place in the Colony of Nova Scotia, for the (due to a counting error which occurred this election) 22nd General Assembly of Nova Scotia
- Nova Scotia general election, 1863, the 22nd general election to take place in the Colony of Nova Scotia, for the 23rd General Assembly of Nova Scotia
- 1953 Nova Scotia general election, the 44th overall general election for Nova Scotia, for the 45th Legislative Assembly of Nova Scotia, but considered the 22nd general election for the Canadian province of Nova Scotia
