= Henry Jost =

Henry Jost may refer to:

- Henry L. Jost (1873–1950), U.S. congressman
- Henry S. Jost (1804–1889), merchant and political figure in Nova Scotia
