= Paul Denis =

Paul Denis may refer to:

- Paul Denis (cyclist), French cyclist
- Paul Denis (Haiti politician), politician of the Democratic Convergence of Haiti and the Haitian Justice Minister
- Paul Denis (Quebec politician), lawyer and political figure in Quebec
