= McGiverin =

McGiverin is a surname. Notable people with the surname include:

- Arthur A. McGiverin (1928–2019), American judge
- Harold McGiverin (1870–1931), Canadian lawyer and politician
- William McGiverin (1825–1881), Canada-West politician
