= 23rd Nova Scotia general election =

The 23rd Nova Scotia general election may refer to

- the Nova Scotia general election, 1863, the 22nd general election to take place in the Colony of Nova Scotia, for the (due to a counting error in 1859) 23rd General Assembly of Nova Scotia,
- the 1867 Nova Scotia general election, the 23rd overall general election for Nova Scotia, for the 24th General Assembly of Nova Scotia, but considered the 1st general election for the Canadian province of Nova Scotia, or
- the 1956 Nova Scotia general election, the 45th overall general election for Nova Scotia, for the 46th Legislative Assembly of Nova Scotia, but considered the 23rd general election for the Canadian province of Nova Scotia.
