= Hastings North =

Former federal electoral district in Ontario, Canada

Hastings North was a federal electoral district represented in the House of Commons of Canada from 1867 to 1904. It was located in the province of Ontario. It was created by the British North America Act 1867 which divided the County of Hastings into three ridings: Hastings West, Hastings East and Hastings North.

The North Riding consisted of the Townships of Rawdon, Huntingdon, Madoc, Elzevir, Tudor, Marmora and Lake, and the Village of Stirling, and any other surveyed Townships lying to the North of the said North Riding.

The electoral district was abolished in 1903 when it was redistributed between Hastings West and Hastings East ridings.

== Election results ==
1867 Canadian federal election
Party	Candidate	Votes
Conservative	Mackenzie Bowell	928
Liberal	Thomas Campbell Wallbridge	636
Unknown	McLean	1

Result by municipality

Municipality	Bowell	McLean	Wallbridge	Total vote	Eligible voters
Rawdon Township	244	0	205	449	530
Elzevir Township	136	0	18	154	200
Madoc Township	273	0	147	420	517
Marmora Township, etc.	48	0	24	72	91
Tudor Townnship, etc.	21	1	4	26	34
Huntingdon Township	156	0	204	360	415
Stirling Township	50	0	34	84	105
Total	928	1	636	1,565	1,892

1872 Canadian federal election
Party	Candidate	Votes
Conservative	Mackenzie Bowell	766
Liberal	Thomas Campbell Wallbridge	559

1874 Canadian federal election
Party	Candidate	Votes
Conservative	Mackenzie Bowell	847
Liberal	Edmund O'Flynn	752

1878 Canadian federal election
Party	Candidate	Votes
Conservative	Mackenzie Bowell	1,249
Liberal	Edmund O'Flynn	1,008

On Mr. Bowell being named Minister of Customs, 19 October 1878:

By-election on 6 November 1878
Party	Candidate	Votes
Conservative	Mackenzie Bowell	acclaimed

1882 Canadian federal election
Party	Candidate	Votes
Conservative	Mackenzie Bowell	1,408
Liberal	William Coe	1,057

1887 Canadian federal election
Party	Candidate	Votes
Conservative	Mackenzie Bowell	1,723
Liberal	Henry Hugh Sutton	682

1891 Canadian federal election
Party	Candidate	Votes
Conservative	Mackenzie Bowell	1,686
Liberal	Peter VanKleek	1,480

On Mr. Bowell being called to the Senate, 5 December 1892:

By-election on 20 December 1892
Party	Candidate	Votes
Conservative	Alexander Carscallen	acclaimed

1896 Canadian federal election
Party	Candidate	Votes
Conservative	Alexander Carscallen	2,478
McCarthyite	Samuel Haryett	1,735

1900 Canadian federal election
Party	Candidate	Votes
Conservative	Alexander Carscallen	2,426
Liberal	Samuel Haryett	1,771

== See also ==
- List of Canadian electoral districts
- Historical federal electoral districts of Canada
