= 21st Nova Scotia general election =

The 21st Nova Scotia general election may refer to

- the Nova Scotia general election, 1859, the 21st general election to take place in the Colony of Nova Scotia, for the (due to a counting error which occurred this election) 22nd General Assembly of Nova Scotia, or
- the 1949 Nova Scotia general election, the 43rd overall general election for Nova Scotia, for the 44th Legislative Assembly of Nova Scotia, but considered the 21st general election for the Canadian province of Nova Scotia.
