= Robert Bell (Ottawa politician) =

British surveyor of Canada

Robert Bell (1823 – February 25, 1873) was a surveyor, journalist and political figure in Canada West.

He was born in Ireland in 1821 and arrived in New York state with his parents. In 1823, they moved to a farm near Kemptville, Upper Canada. He qualified as a land surveyor for the province in 1843. He moved to Bytown, where he began work as a surveyor. He surveyed the Muskoka, Haliburton and Nipissing areas as part of the government's plan to open up these areas for settlement.

In 1849, he purchased the Bytown Packet newspaper (renamed the Ottawa Citizen in 1851) from Henry J. Friel and John George Bell. In it Bell expounded his ideas for promoting the settlement of the waste lands between Bytown and Lake Huron. He helped found the Bytown and Prescott Railway and later became president. He served on the town council for Bytown and later represented Russell in the 7th and 8th Parliaments for the Province of Canada.

He died in Hull, Quebec in 1873.

1867 Canadian federal election: Russell
| Party | Candidate | Votes |
|---|---|---|
| Conservative | James Grant | 1,293 |
| Unknown | Robert Bell | 695 |
