= John A.H. Powell =

Upper Canada politician

John Ambrose Hume Powell (?? – July 20, 1843) was a political figure in Upper Canada.

He was born in Ireland and came to Perth in Upper Canada with his family. His father, Colonel James Powell, was superintendent of the military settlement at Perth and the first sheriff in the Bathurst District. John served as captain in the local militia. In 1834, he was named sheriff in the Bathurst District when his father returned to Ireland. He was elected to the 13th Parliament of Upper Canada for Lanark in 1836. He died in Perth in 1843.

His brother William F. Powell later served in the legislative assembly for the Province of Canada.
