= Amos Atkinson Bliss =

Canadian politician (1830–1882)

Amos Atkinson Bliss (November 16, 1830 – December 2, 1882) was a political figure in New Brunswick, Canada. He represented Albert County in the Legislative Assembly of New Brunswick from 1867 to 1870.

He was born in Amherst, Nova Scotia, the son of Isaac Bliss and Priscilla Read. He married a Miss Melvina Raworth, daughter of Ephraim Gordon Raworth and Carlisle Chappell in 1855. After her death, he remarried Lois Gross. Bliss was elected to the provincial assembly in an 1867 by-election held after John Lewis was named to the province's Legislative Council.
