= François Tassé =

Canadian politician

François Tassé (August 11, 1774 – August 6, 1832) was a merchant and political figure in Lower Canada. He represented Effingham in the Legislative Assembly of Lower Canada from 1820 to 1824.

He was born François-Amable Tassé in Saint-Martin, Quebec, the son of Charles Tassé and Élisabeth Bisson. He was a merchant on Île Jésus. In 1792, he married Élisabeth Leblanc. Tassé died in Saint-Martin at the age of 57.

His grandson François-Zéphirin Tassé served in the legislative assembly for the Province of Canada.
