= Michel-Adrien Bessette =

Canadian politician

Member of the Legislative Assembly of Quebec for Shefford
- In office 1867–1871
- Succeeded by: Maurice Laframboise

Personal details
- Born: September 27, 1827 Saint-Luc, near Iberville, Lower Canada
- Died: November 28, 1904 (aged 77)
- Party: Conservative

Michel-Adrien Bessette (September 27, 1827 – November 28, 1904) was a merchant and political figure in Quebec. He represented Shefford in the Legislative Assembly of Quebec from 1867 to 1871 as a Conservative.

He was born in Saint-Luc, Lower Canada, the son of Daniel Bessette and Justine C. Audet. Bessette set up business at North Stukely. In 1852, he married Susan Wood Stevens. Bessette served as mayor of North Stukely and major in the militia. He ran unsuccessfully in Shefford for a seat in the legislative assembly for the Province of Canada in 1861 and 1863 and was defeated when he ran for reelection in 1871. Bessette was registrar for Iberville County from 1876 to 1897. He died at the age of 77 and was buried in Iberville.
