= Édouard Rémillard =

Canadian politician

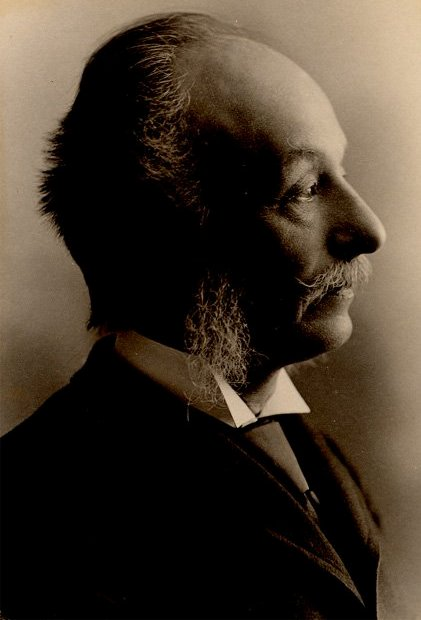

Member of the Legislative Council of Quebec for De la Durantaye
- In office 1878–1887
- Preceded by: Joseph-Octave Beaubien
- Succeeded by: Pierre Garneau

Personal details
- Born: January 9, 1830 Saints-Gervais-et-Protais (Saint-Gervais), Lower Canada
- Died: July 29, 1909 (aged 79) Quebec City, Quebec
- Party: Liberal

Édouard Rémillard (January 9, 1830 – July 29, 1909) was a lawyer and political figure in Quebec. He represented Bellechasse in the Legislative Assembly of the Province of Canada from 1861 to 1866.

He was born in Saint-Gervais, Quebec, the son of Adrien Rémillard and Marguerite Boucher. Rémillard was educated at the Petit Séminaire de Québec, was admitted to the Lower Canada bar in 1856 and set up practice in Quebec City, practising for a time with Christian Pozer. Rémillard also served as captain in the militia. He supported Confederation. In 1860, he married Marie-Émilie Malvina Évanturel, the sister of François Évanturel. He was an unsuccessful candidate for a seat in the Canadian House of Commons in 1867 and for a seat in the Quebec assembly in 1871. Rémillard was named to La Durantaye division of the Legislative Council of Quebec in 1878 and served until 1887. In 1890 he was named registrar for Quebec City district. He died in Quebec City at the age of 79.

1867 Canadian federal election: Bellechasse
Party	Candidate	Votes
Conservative	Louis-Napoléon Casault	983
Unknown	Édouard Rémillard	671
Source: Canadian Elections Database
