= Jean-Baptiste-Jules Prévost =

Jean-Baptiste-Jules Prévost (March 7, 1828 – 1881 or later) was a merchant and political figure in Canada East. He represented Soulanges in the Legislative Assembly of the Province of Canada from 1861 to 1863.

He was born in Terrebonne, the son of François-Hyacinthe Prévost and Angélique-Athalie Turgeon, and established himself in business at Saint-Polycarpe. Prévost was defeated when he ran for election to the assembly in 1863. He was mayor of Saint-Polycarpe from 1868 to 1872 and from 1878 to 1881. Prévost was married twice: to Mary Ellen McIntosh in 1853 and then to Marie Giroux in 1856.
