= Henry Moseley (politician) =

Canadian politician

Henry Moseley (c. 1818 – September 1, 1864) was a shipbuilder and political figure in Nova Scotia. He represented Lunenburg County in the Nova Scotia House of Assembly as a Reformer.

Moseley, the son of Phineas E. Moseley and Sally Tilton, both from the United States, was born on a ship in Halifax harbour. In 1853, he left Halifax for Australia with his brother Ebenezer; their small vessel was forced to seek shelter from a storm at the LaHave River and they settled there instead. He died at the age of 46.
