= Frederick W. Haultain =

Frederick W. Haultain (November 7, 1821 – December 9, 1882) was a British Army officer and political figure in Canada West.

He was born in Brussels, Belgium, in 1821 to Major General Francis Haultain and Eliza Ann Dean. He was a grandson of Lieutenant Colonel Theodore Haultain. Haultain lived in Belgium while his father was stationed there and eventually returned to Britain. He studied at the Royal Military Academy in Woolwich, England, served with the Royal Artillery and retired as lieutenant-colonel in 1860. He moved to Canada and settled at Peterborough later that year. He was elected to the 7th Parliament of the Province of Canada representing Peterborough in 1861 as a Conservative. In 1864, as a member of the Reform Party, he was elected to the same seat in a by-election for the 8th Parliament of the Province of Canada.

Haultain later moved to Montreal to work with missionaries before returned with his family to Peterborough.

Haultain died in 1882. His wife, Lucinde Helen Gordon, died in 1915.

His son, Frederick W. A. G. Haultain, served as Conservative premier of the Northwest Territories and played an important role in establishing the provinces of Alberta and Saskatchewan.
