= Abraham Hebb =

Canadian politician (1813–1880)

Abraham Hebb (1813 – September 18, 1880) was a farmer and political figure in Nova Scotia. He represented Lunenburg County in the Nova Scotia House of Assembly from 1865 to 1867.

He was born at Hebb's Mills in Lunenburg County, Nova Scotia, the son of John George Hebb. Hebb owned orchards where he grew apples, grapes and peaches. He was elected to the provincial assembly in a by-election held following the death of Dr. William Slocumb. He died at home at the age of 67.

Hebb's son William established a cranberry bog on the family farm which is believed to be the oldest commercial cranberry bog in Canada.
