= Charles de Cazes =

Member of the Legislative Assembly of the Province of Canada for Richmond-Wolfe
- In office 1861–1863

Personal details
- Born: 1808 Brittany, France
- Died: October 4, 1867 (aged 58–59) Montreal, Canada
- Party: Independent; Liberal-Conservative
- Spouse: Constance Arnaud
- Occupation: politician

Charles de Caze (1808 – October 4, 1867) was a notary and political figure in Canada East.

He was born in Brittany in 1808, arrived in Quebec City in 1854 and settled in the Eastern Townships. He was elected to the Legislative Assembly of the Province of Canada for Richmond—Wolfe in 1861 and defeated in 1863. He wished to improve the state of agriculture in Canada East. De Caze was the first francophone member elected in the Eastern Townships. After his term in office, he was appointed inspector of schools for the counties of Saint-Hyacinthe, Bagot, and Rouville. He died in Montreal in 1867 while being treated for a liver disease.
