= Robert MacFarlane (Canadian politician) =

Canadian politician (1835-1872)

Robert MacFarlane (March 23, 1835 – June 1, 1872) was a lawyer and Liberal member of the House of Commons of Canada representing Perth South from 1867 to 1872.

He was born in Pakenham in Upper Canada in 1835, the son of William MacFarlane and Isabella Dickson, was educated in Toronto and was called to the Upper Canada bar in 1857. MacFarlane practised law in Stratford, Ontario with future Supreme Court Justice John Idington. He married Mary Elizabeth Wood in 1870. In 1862, he ran unsuccessfully against Thomas Mayne Daly in a by-election in Perth County; in 1863, he defeated Daly and represented Perth in the 8th Parliament of the Province of Canada. When the county was split into two parts after Confederation, he was elected federally in the south riding. He died in Ottawa while still in office in 1872.
