= Robert Patterson Grant =

Canadian politician

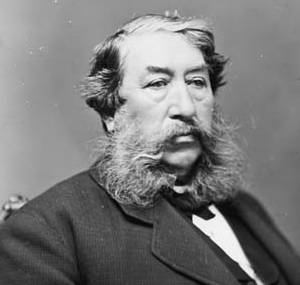
Robert Patterson Grant Source: Library and Archives Canada

Robert Patterson Grant (April 12, 1814 – November 13, 1892) was a Scottish-born merchant and political figure in Nova Scotia, Canada. He sat for the Pictou division in the Senate of Canada from 1877 to 1892.

The son of Lewis Grant, he was born in Inverness and educated at the Inverness Royal Academy. Grant came to Canada in 1833, moving to Nova Scotia in 1835. In 1840, he married Annie Carmichael. Grant was the president of the Pictou Bank. He represented the East Region of Pictou County in the Legislative Assembly of Nova Scotia from 1859 to 1863 as a Liberal. Grant died in office at the age of 78.
