= William Slocumb =

Canadian politician

William Slocumb (September 26, 1810 – September 25, 1865) was a medical doctor and political figure in Nova Scotia, Canada. He represented Lunenburg County in the Nova Scotia House of Assembly from 1863 to 1865 as a Liberal-Conservative. His surname also appears as Slocomb in some sources.

He was born in Annapolis, Nova Scotia, the son of Caleb Slocumb and Sarah Lennahan. Slocumb was educated at Bowdoin College in Maine, continuing his studies in medicine in Philadelphia and London. In 1838, he married Emeline Little. He lived in Lunenburg, Nova Scotia and died there in office at the age of 54.
