= Albert Knight (politician) =

Albert Knight (February 12, 1817 – after 1881) was a merchant and political figure in Quebec. He represented Stanstead in the Legislative Assembly of the Province of Canada from 1861 to 1866.

He was born in Waterford, Vermont, the son of Samuel Knight. He worked as a clerk before establishing his own business at Stanstead Plain in the Eastern Townships. Knight helped establish the Saint Francis bank and the Waterloo, Magog and Stanstead Railway, and was president of the Eastern Townships Bank branch at Stanstead. He was also involved in several mining companies. In 1838, he married Julia Ann Rose. Knight was an unsuccessful candidate for a seat in the Legislative Assembly in 1858 and for a seat in the Canadian House of Commons in 1867.

His daughter Florence Alberta married Michael Felix Hackett.

1867 Canadian federal election: Stanstead
Party	Candidate	Votes
Liberal–Conservative	Charles Carroll Colby	814
Unknown	Albert Knight	616
Source: Canadian Elections Database
