= Hippolite Cornellier =

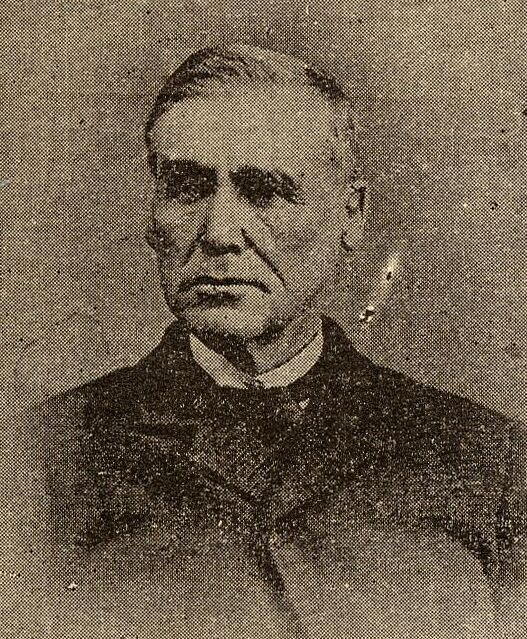
Hyppolite Cornellier

Hippolite Cornellier (March 2, 1820 – May 21, 1887) was a teacher, farmer and political figure in Quebec. He represented Joliette in the Legislative Assembly of the Province of Canada from 1863 to 1866. His surname also appears as Cornellier dit Grandchamp or Corneillier dit Grandchamp.

He was born in Sainte-Élisabeth, Quebec, the son of Joseph Cornellier and Élisabeth Cadette, and was educated there and in Upper Canada. He married Henriette Lavallé in 1844. In 1857, he was named a justice of the peace. Cornellier was mayor of Sainte-Élisabeth in 1864 and from 1870 to 1872. He was named a federal customs officer after Confederation and served in that post until his death in Sainte-Élisabeth at the age of 67.
