= James G. Stevens =

Canadian politician

James Gray Stevens, QC (February 25, 1822 – October 16, 1906) was a Scottish-born lawyer, judge and political figure in New Brunswick. He represented Charlotte County in the Legislative Assembly of New Brunswick from 1861 to 1865 and from 1866 to 1867.

He was born in Edinburgh, the son of Andrew Stevens and Grace Buchanan Campbell, and was educated at the University of Edinburgh. Stevens came to St. Stephen, New Brunswick in 1840, studied law with Alexander Campbell and David Shanks Kerr and was called to the bar in 1847. In 1853, he married Elizabeth Helen Marks. He was named Queen's Counsel in 1867. In the same year, he was named judge in the county courts for Charlotte, Carleton, Victoria and Madawaska. Stevens served thirty years as president of the St. Croix agricultural society and eight years as secretary for the provincial board of agriculture. He also served as chairman for the board of school trustees.

For a time, Stevens practiced law in partnership with James Mitchell who later served as premier for the province.

His brother, Rev Andrew Stevens, was the first Presbyterian minister in Wallacetown, New Zealand.
