= Maurice Laframboise =

Canadian politician

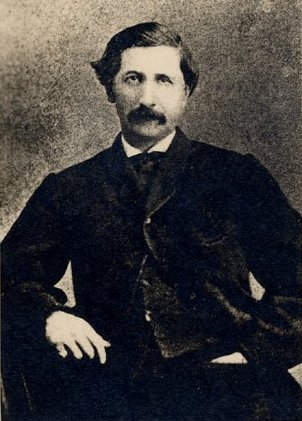

Member of the Legislative Assembly of Quebec for Shefford
- In office 1871–1878
- Preceded by: Michel-Adrien Bessette
- Succeeded by: Joseph Lafontaine

Personal details
- Born: August 18, 1821 Montreal, Lower Canada
- Died: February 1, 1882 (aged 60) Montreal, Quebec
- Party: Liberal

Maurice Laframboise (August 18, 1821 – February 1, 1882) was a Quebec lawyer, judge and political figure.

== Biography ==
He was born Maurice-Alexis Laframboise in Montreal, Lower Canada in 1821. He studied at the Petit Séminaire de Montréal, then articled in law and was called to the bar in 1843. He set up practice in Saint-Hyacinthe. In 1846, he married Marie-Eugénie-Rosalie Dessaulles, daughter of Jean Dessaulles; he looked after the family seigneury until 1852 when the property was distributed among his father-in-law's children.

Laframboise was mayor of Saint-Hyacinthe from 1857 to 1860. In 1858, he was elected in Bagot as a member of the Parti rouge; he was reelected in 1861 and 1863. He was named to the Executive Council in 1863 as commissioner of Public Works; as was required at the time, he was elected in a by-election that same year for the same seat after being named to the cabinet. He opposed confederation; he was defeated in 1867 when he ran in Bagot for a seat in the federal parliament. In 1871, he was elected to the Legislative Assembly of Quebec for Shefford as a Liberal; he was reelected in 1875. In 1878, he was named judge in the Quebec Superior Court for the Gaspé district.

== Personal ==
He died in Montreal in 1882.

His daughter Marie-Angélique-Rosalie married Louis-Onésime Loranger.

1867 Canadian federal election: Bagot
Party	Candidate	Votes
Conservative	Pierre-Samuel Gendron	1,156
Unknown	Maurice Laframboise	889
Source: Canadian Elections Database
