= François-Zéphirin Tassé =

Canadian mayor

François-Zéphirin Tassé (May 14, 1825 – February 20, 1886) was a medical doctor and political figure in Quebec. He represented Jacques Cartier in the Legislative Assembly of the Province of Canada from 1858 to 1864.

He was born in Saint-Martin, Quebec, the son of Pierre Tassé, the son of François Tassé, and Marie Valiquette, and was educated at the Petit Séminaire de Sainte-Thérèse. He apprenticed as a physician and practised in Saint-Laurent, Montreal and Saint-Vincent-de-Paul. Tassé served as a governor of the College of Physicians and Surgeons for Lower Canada and as a federal medical examiner. He also served on the town council for Saint-Laurent and as mayor. Tassé married Rose-de-Lima Painchaud in 1846. He resigned his seat in 1864 to become inspector of prisons. In 1873, he was named director of the Saint-Vincent-de-Paul prison at Laval. Tassé died in Montreal at the age of 60 and was buried in the Notre Dame des Neiges Cemetery.
