= George Stayley Brown =

Canadian politician

MLA for Yarmouth township
- In office 1863–1866

Personal details
- Born: November 20, 1827 Yarmouth, Nova Scotia
- Died: September 12, 1915 (aged 87) Boston, Massachusetts
- Spouse: Elizabeth Bond
- Occupation: Politician

George Stayley Brown (November 20, 1827 – September 12, 1915) was a ship owner, historian and political figure in Nova Scotia. He represented Yarmouth township in the Nova Scotia House of Assembly from 1863 to 1866 as a Reformer.

== Biography ==
He was born in Yarmouth, Nova Scotia, the son of Stayley Brown, a member of the Legislative Council, and Charlotte Letitia Fletcher. In 1856, he married Elizabeth Bond. Brown was a director and president of the Acadian Marine Insurance Company. He served as a justice of the peace and as a member of the Central Board of Agriculture. Brown was consul for Spain in Yarmouth in 1869. He moved to Boston around 1875. He published Yarmouth, Nova Scotia : a sequel to Campbell's history in 1888. He died in Boston at the age of 87.
