= William Shand Caie =

Canadian politician

William Shand Caie (August 18, 1814 – October 3, 1873) was a Scottish-born merchant and political figure. He represented Kent County in the Legislative Assembly of New Brunswick from 1865 to 1873.

He was born in Nairn, the son of Robert Shand Caie and Isabella Low, came to New Brunswick with his parents and was educated in Miramichi. In 1840, he married Isabella Trider. Caie was also involved in shipping timber. He served in the local militia. In 1871, Caie was named to the province's Executive Council. He died in office in 1873.
