= Daniel Charles Moore =

Nova Scotia politician (1801–1890)

Daniel Charles Moore (December 13, 1801 – October 12, 1890) was a merchant, ship owner and political figure in Nova Scotia. He represented King's County in the Nova Scotia House of Assembly from 1847 to 1855, from 1861 to 1867 and from 1871 to 1874.

He was born in Canning, Nova Scotia, the son of William Charles Moore and Elizabeth Harrington. Moore became involved in shipbuilding at a young age. He entered business as a general merchant in Kentville in partnership with James Martin, later becoming sole owner. He was also involved in farming and the timber trade. Moore was elected to the provincial assembly in an 1861 by-election following the death of William Bennett Webster. Although Moore was a Conservative, he opposed Confederation. He was unsuccessful in a bid for reelection in 1874. Moore died in Kentville at the age of 88.
