= Alexandre Dufresne =

Alexandre Dufresne (April 20, 1818 – after 1877) was a merchant and political figure in Quebec. He represented Iberville in the Legislative Assembly of the Province of Canada from 1861 to 1866.

He was born in Belœil, Quebec, the son of Jean-Baptiste Dufresne and Ursule Poirier. Dufresne established himself as a merchant at Christieville (later Iberville). He helped establish the Franco-Canadien in Saint-Jean-sur-Richelieu. In 1843, he married Élizabeth Favelin. Dufresne was mayor of Iberville from 1858 to 1860, from 1873 to 1874 and from 1875 to 1877. Around 1864, he helped establish a branch of the Saint-Jean-Baptiste Society in the region. Dufresne ran unsuccessfully for a seat in the Canadian House of Commons and the Quebec assembly in 1867.

1867 Canadian federal election: Iberville
Party	Candidate	Votes	Elected
Liberal	François Béchard	1,035	✓
Unknown	Alexandre Dufresne	504	
Source: Canadian Elections Database
