= Samuel Leonard Shannon =

Canadian judge and politician (1816–1895)

- Born: June 1, 1816; Halifax, Nova Scotia, Canada
- Died: January 7, 1895 (aged 78); Halifax, Nova Scotia, Canada
- Education: University of King's College
- Occupations: Lawyer, judge, politician

Samuel Leonard Shannon, QC (June 1, 1816 – January 7, 1895) was a Canadian lawyer, judge and political figure in Nova Scotia, Canada. He represented Halifax County in the Nova Scotia House of Assembly from 1859 to 1867.

== Biography ==
He was born in Halifax, Nova Scotia on June 1, 1816. The son of James Noble Shannon, a city merchant, and Nancy Allison. Shannon was educated at the University of King's College. He articled in law with Henry Pryor and was called to the bar in 1839. In 1855, he married Annie Starr Fellows. Shannon served in the local militia, reaching the rank of lieutenant-colonel. In 1858, he was named a Nova Scotia railway board commissioner. Shannon was named Queen's Counsel in 1864. He served as a minister without portfolio in the province's Executive Council from 1863 to 1867. He supported the development of an intercolonial railway, free common schools and Confederation. Shannon served on the board of governors for Dalhousie College and helped establish the Dalhousie Law School, serving as one of its first instructors. In 1881, he was named probate judge for Halifax County. Shannon died in Halifax on January 7, 1895, at the age of 78.
