= William Duckett (Canadian politician) =

Canadian politician

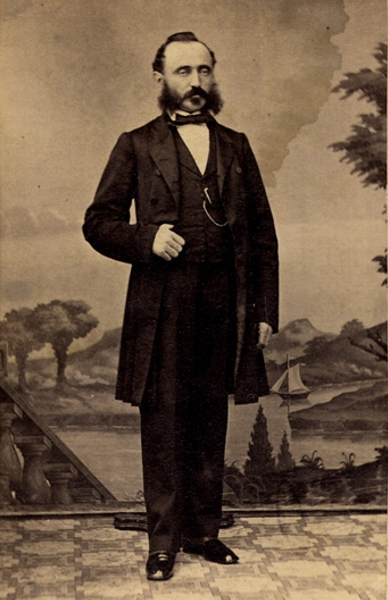
William Duckett

William Duckett (February 12, 1825 – September 19, 1887) was a merchant and political figure in Quebec. He represented Soulanges in the Legislative Assembly of the Province of Canada from 1863 to 1866 and in the Legislative Assembly of Quebec from 1878 to 1886 as a Conservative member.

== Life ==
He was born in Montreal, the son of William Duckett and Marie-Monique Chevrier, and was educated there. Duckett became a merchant at Coteau-Landing. In 1848, he married Clémence-Iphigénie Prieur. He was defeated when he ran for reelection in 1886. Duckett died at Coteau-Landing at the age of 62.
