= Vital Hébert =

Canadian politician

Vital Hébert (c. 1808 – 1867) was a landowner and political figure in New Brunswick. He represented Victoria in the Legislative Assembly of New Brunswick from 1866 to 1867. He was the first French-speaking member to represent the county in the assembly.

He was the son of Simon "Simonet" Hébert. Hébert served as deputy treasurer for Victoria County in 1865. He died in office at the age of 59.
