= Robert Thorne Babbit =

Canadian politician

Robert Thorne Babbit (September 27, 1831 – January 9, 1901) was a merchant and political figure in New Brunswick. He represented Queen's County in the Legislative Assembly of New Brunswick from 1866 to 1871.

He was born in Gagetown, New Brunswick, the son of Elkanah Babbit and Dorothy Creighton. He learned the trade of harness making before becoming a merchant. Babbit also worked for several years at railway construction. In 1854, he married Ella L. Currey. He resigned his seat in 1871 to become registrar of deeds for Queen's County. He served in the county militia, reaching the rank of lieutenant colonel. He also was county coroner and a school trustee.
