= Henry Kaulback =

Canadian politician

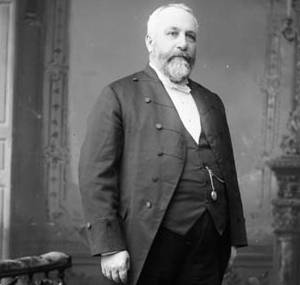
Henry Kaulbach Source: Library and Archives Canada

Henry Adolphus Newman Kaulback (December 28, 1830 – January 8, 1896) was a lawyer, ship owner, and political figure in Nova Scotia, Canada. He represented Lunenburg County in the Nova Scotia House of Assembly from 1863 to 1867 and sat for Lunenburg in the Senate of Canada from 1872 to 1896. His surname also appears as Kaulbach in some sources.

He was born in Lunenburg, Nova Scotia, the son of John H. Kaulback, high sheriff, and Sophia Fredericka Newman. Kaulback was educated at Harvard University. He was called to the Nova Scotia bar in 1855. He served on the province's board of agriculture and was lieutenant-colonel in the local militia. Kaulback practised law in Lunenburg. Kaulback ran unsuccessfully for a seat in the House of Commons in 1867. He died in office in Ottawa, January 8, 1896 at the age of 65.

== Family ==
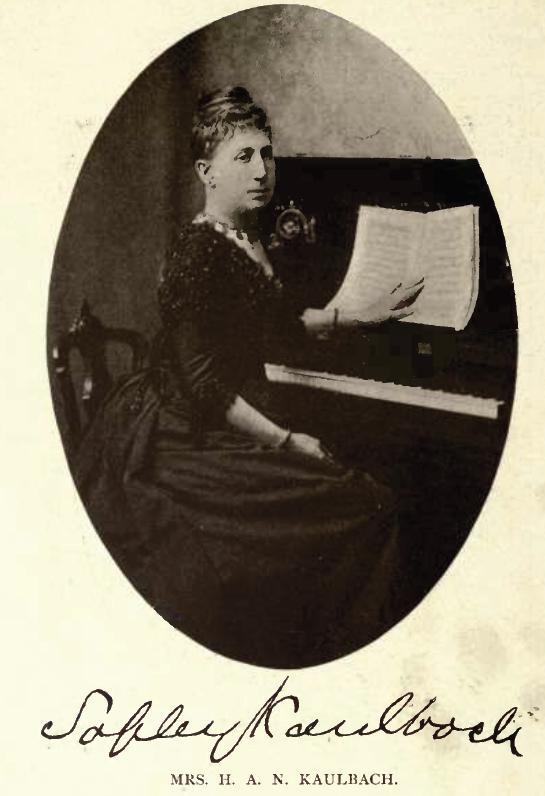
Mrs. Sophie Anne Kaulbach (née Ryland)

He was married twice. He married Eunice Sophie Harris in 1858. Hon. Henry Adolphus Newman Kaulbach, Q.C., then a member of the Senate married in September 1880 Sophie Anne Ryland, daughter of George H. Ryland, Registrar of Montreal, and his wife, Mary Pitt, daughter of Lieut.-Col. Ralph Gore, of Barrowmount, County Kilkenny, and of H.M.'s 33rd Regiment of Foot. She was born in Quebec, and educated by private tuition. She was an amateur singer and pianist. She was instructed for the piano, by Prof. D'Albert, and in singing by Prof. Arthurson and Dr. Shilling. She was a member of the Montreal Fox Hounds. The couple lived at Mizpah Cottage, Lunenburg, Nova Scotia.

His brother Charles served in the Canadian House of Commons.
