= William Miller (Canadian politician) =

Canadian politician, born 1835

The Honourable William Miller PC
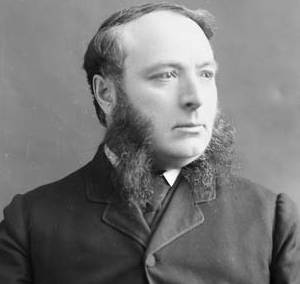

Senator for Richmond, Nova Scotia
- In office 1867–1912
- Appointed by: Royal Proclamation

Member of the Nova Scotia House of Assembly for Richmond
- In office 1863–1867

Personal details
- Born: February 12, 1835 Antigonish, Nova Scotia
- Died: February 23, 1912 (aged 77)
- Party: Liberal-Conservative

William Miller PC (February 12, 1835 – February 23, 1912) was a Canadian politician.

Born in Antigonish, Nova Scotia, the son of Charles Miller and Elizabeth Smith, he was educated at the Antigonish Academy, studied law and was called the bar of Nova Scotia in 1860. He set up practice in Arichat.

In 1863, he was elected as a Reformer to the Legislative Assembly of Nova Scotia representing the Cape Breton riding of Richmond County. In 1867, at the age of 32, he was summoned to the Senate of Canada representing the senatorial division of Richmond, Nova Scotia. He was the youngest person ever summoned to the Canadian Senate. From 1883 to 1887, he was the Speaker of the Senate of Canada. In 1871, Miller married Annie Cochran. He served until his death in 1912.
