= Lewis Wallbridge =

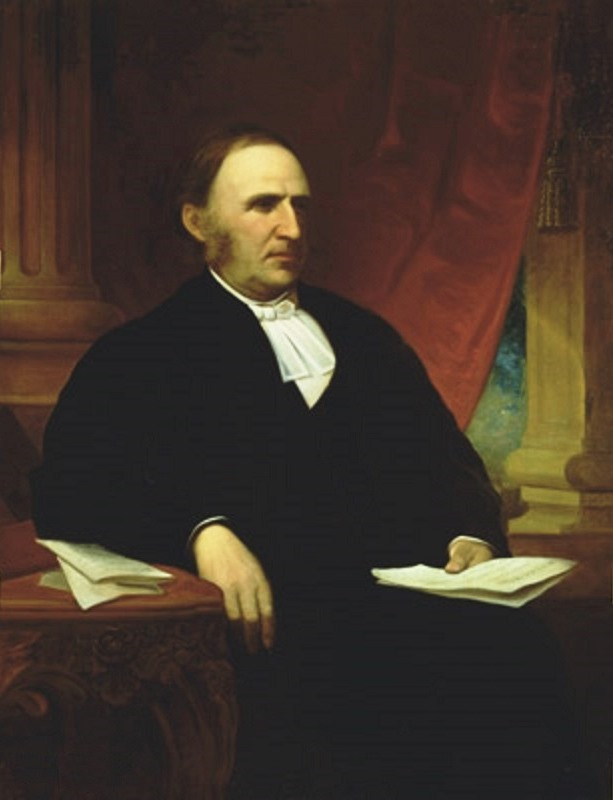

Member of the Legislative Assembly of the Province of Canada for Hastings South
- In office 1857–1867

Speaker of the Legislative Assembly of the Province of Canada
- In office 1863–1866
- Preceded by: Joseph-Édouard Turcotte
- Succeeded by: none

Personal details
- Born: November 27, 1816 Belleville, Upper Canada
- Died: October 20, 1887 (aged 70) Winnipeg, Manitoba
- Occupation: Lawyer

Lewis Wallbridge (November 27, 1816 – October 20, 1887) was a lawyer, judge and political figure in Canada West. In 1882, he was appointed Chief Justice of Manitoba.

He was born in Belleville in 1816. He studied at Upper Canada College, articled in law and was called to the bar in 1839. In 1855, he became a Queen's Counsel. In 1857, he was elected to represent Hastings South in the Legislative Assembly of the Province of Canada. He supported representation by population and opposed government subsidies to the Grand Trunk Railway. He was re-elected in 1861 and 1863. He was chosen as solicitor general in the 1863 government led by John Sandfield Macdonald and Antoine-Aimé Dorion and was chosen as speaker for the 8th Parliament of the Province of Canada. His brother, Thomas Campbell Wallbridge, represented Hastings North from 1863 to 1867. He did not run for election in 1867 and was an unsuccessful candidate for the House of Commons in Hastings West in 1878.

He was a director of the Bank of Upper Canada from 1862 to 1865.

He died in Winnipeg in 1887.
