= William Bennett Webster =

Canadian politician

William Bennett Webster (January 18, 1798 – April 4, 1861) was a medical doctor, amateur geologist and political figure in Nova Scotia. He represented King's County in the Nova Scotia House of Assembly from 1855 to 1861.

He was born in Kentville, Nova Scotia, the son of Doctor Isaac Webster and Prudence Bentley. He studied medicine at the University of Edinburgh, later returning to Kentville around 1822. In 1826, Webster married Wilhelmina Moore. He helped found the Nova Scotia Medical Society in 1854. He also laid out the plan for the main streets of Kentville. Webster died in office at Halifax at the age of 63. His geological collection was donated to the provincial museum.
