= Pierre-Gabriel Huot =

Canadian politician

Pierre-Gabriel Huot (September 20, 1825 – September 1, 1913) was a Quebec journalist and political figure. He was a Liberal member of the House of Commons of Canada representing Quebec East from 1867 to 1870.

He was born in Quebec City in 1825. He qualified as a notary in 1850, but never practised this profession. He entered journalism and was owner and editor of the Quebec bi-weekly newspaper Le National. In 1854, he was elected to the Legislative Assembly of the Province of Canada representing Saguenay; the election was invalidated, but he was reelected in an 1855 by-election. In 1860, he was elected in Quebec East in a by-election; he was reelected in 1861 and 1863. In 1860, he was also elected to the Legislative Council for Stadacona division; however, the election was declared invalid in May 1861. He had submitted his resignation from his position in the Legislative Assembly, but it was not accepted by the speaker. After Confederation, Huot was elected again in Quebec East; he resigned in 1870 to become postmaster at Quebec, a position he held until 1874.

He moved to the United States in 1886 and died in New York City in 1913.

1867 Canadian federal election: Quebec East/Québec-Est
Party	Candidate	Votes
Liberal	Pierre Huot	acclaimed
Source: Canadian Elections Database
