= Leonidas Burwell =

Canadian politician (1818–1879)

Leonidas Burwell (January 22, 1818 – August 7, 1879) was a businessman and political figure in Canada West. He represented East Elgin in the Legislative Assembly of the Province of Canada from 1857 to 1866.

He was born in Port Talbot, Upper Canada, the son of Mahlon Burwell. He served as deputy registrar of lands for Middlesex County. Burwell took over his father's business at Port Burwell in 1842. Burwell was also a justice of the peace. In 1843, he married Phoebe Jane Wrong.
