= Henry Munro (Canada West politician) =

Henry Munro (January 13, 1802 – December 20, 1874) was a farmer and political figure in Canada West.

He was one of the founders of the Bond Head Harbour Company in 1838. He was named a justice of the peace in 1843 and was also a lieutenant in the local militia. Munro served as treasurer for Clarke Township. He was elected to the Legislative Assembly of the Province of Canada for West Durham in 1854; he was reelected in 1858, 1861 and 1863. He stood aside in 1867 to allow Edward Blake to run for the seat in the House of Commons.

Henry Munro has a middle school named after him in Ottawa, Ontario, Canada.
