= Thomas Campbell Wallbridge =

Canadian politician

Thomas Campbell Wallbridge (January 2, 1830 – January 22, 1881) was a lawyer and political figure in Canada West. He represented North Hastings in the Legislative Assembly of the Province of Canada from 1863 to 1866.

He was born in Belleville, Canada West and was educated at Upper Canada College, the Sorbonne, the École de Droit in France and the universities of Geneva and Montpellier. Wallbridge was called to the Upper Canada bar in 1859. He served as a captain in the local militia. Wallbridge was an unsuccessful candidate for a seat in the Legislative Assembly in 1861.

His brother Lewis Wallbridge also served in the Legislative Assembly and was later named Chief Justice of Manitoba.
