= Alexander Macfarlane (politician) =

Canadian politician

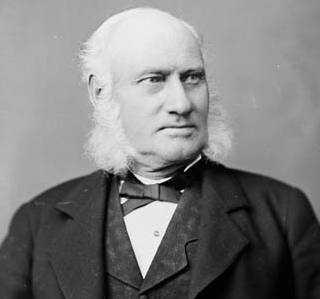
Alexander Macfarlane Source: Library and Archives Canada

Alexander Macfarlane (June 17, 1818 – December 14, 1898) was a Canadian lawyer and politician who served as a member of the Senate of Canada from 1870 to 1898. His surname also appears as McFarlane in some sources.

== Early life and education ==
Macfarlane was born in Wallace, Nova Scotia in 1818. He studied law and was called to the bar in 1844.

== Career ==
Macfarlane represented Cumberland in the Legislative Assembly of Nova Scotia from 1856 to 1867 as a Conservative member. He was appointed Queen's Counsel in 1867. Macfarlane also served as chairman of the Central Board of Agriculture for the province during the 1860s. On October 10, 1870, he was appointed to the Senate for Wallace division; he died while still a member of the Senate.
