= Paul Denis (Quebec politician) =

Paul Denis, QC (before 1843 – after 1866) was a lawyer and political figure in Quebec. He represented Beauharnois in the Legislative Assembly of the Province of Canada from 1861 to 1866.

He was born Paul Saint-Denis, possibly in Beauharnois, Quebec. He studied at the Petit Séminaire de Montréal and was admitted to the Lower Canada bar in 1858. Denis set up practice in Beauharnois. He was an unsuccessful candidate for a seat in the Canadian House of Commons in 1867. Denis was named Queen's Counsel in June 1867.

1867 Canadian federal election: Beauharnois
Party	Candidate	Votes
Conservative	Michael Cayley	724
Unknown	Paul Denis	691
Source: Canadian Elections Database
