= John George Bourinot (elder) =

Canadian politician (1814–1884)

The Honourable John Bourinot
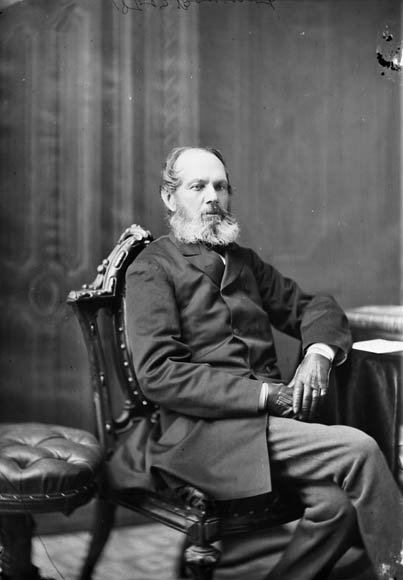
- Bourinot photographed in 1874 by William James Topley

Canadian Senator for Nova Scotia
- In office October 23, 1867 – January 19, 1884
- Prime Minister: John A. Macdonald

Member of the Nova Scotia House of Assembly
- In office 1851–1867
- Constituency: Cape Breton County

Personal details
- Born: March 15, 1814 Grouville, Jersey
- Died: January 19, 1884 (aged 69) Ottawa, Ontario, Canada
- Party: Liberal-Conservative
- Children: John George Bourinot
- Occupation: Merchant

Military service
- Rank: Lieutenant-Colonel
- Unit: Cape Breton Reserve Militia

John Bourinot (March 15, 1814 – January 19, 1884) was a French-speaking Jersey-born Canadian merchant and politician, a member of the first Senate of Canada.

Born in Grouville, Jersey, in the Channel Islands, he was educated in Jersey and in Caen in Normandy in France and emigrated as a young man to Sydney, Nova Scotia, where he opened a business as a ship-chandler. In 1834, shortly after his arrival there, he was appointed French vice-consul and also worked as an agent for Lloyd's of London. In 1835, he married Margaret Ann Marshall, daughter of John George Marshall, from a politically influential local family. Together, they would have eleven children.

In the 1840s, Bourinot lobbied unsuccessfully for the independence of Cape Breton Island from Nova Scotia. In 1859, he was elected as the Conservative MLA of Cape Breton County in Halifax. Bourinot eventually sided with Charles Tupper, voting for the Confederation Resolution in 1866, and was appointed by John A. Macdonald as a Liberal-Conservative member of the first Senate of Canada.

His political career thereafter was unremarkable; Bourinot was mostly active in committee work. He died of a stroke in Ottawa, where he had wanted to attend the opening of parliament in 1884.
