= Andrew Cowie =

Canadian politician

Andrew Cowie (July 20, 1798 – October 21, 1890) was a Scottish-born leather manufacturer, ship owner and political figure in Nova Scotia. He represented Liverpool township from 1851 to 1855 and Queen's County from 1859 to 1867 in the Nova Scotia House of Assembly.

He was born in Auchanbalrige in Banffshire, the son of William Cowie and Elizabeth Milne, and came to Halifax in 1816, settling in Liverpool two years later. He entered business as a dry goods merchant but later acquired a tannery and began to manufacture leather. In 1820, he married Janet More. For a time, Cowie was involved in the lumber trade. He also operated a saddle and harness shop in partnership with his sons. Cowie also served as a magistrate.
