= John Tobin (Nova Scotia politician) =

Canadian politician

John Tobin (1810 – June 9, 1869) was an Irish-born merchant and politician in Nova Scotia. He represented Halifax Township from 1855 to 1859 and Halifax County from 1859 to 1867 in the Legislative Assembly of Nova Scotia.

He was born in Gowran, County Kilkenny and came to North America in the 1820s, living in Newfoundland for a time and later moving to Halifax. In 1841, he married Catherine Walsh. Tobin established a wholesale and retail firm there. During his time in the assembly, he supported funding for Catholic schools in Nova Scotia. Tobin was defeated when he ran for a seat in the House of Commons in 1867 as a pro-Confederation candidate. He died in Halifax, apparently by suicide although the coroner's report was worded somewhat ambiguously. He was buried in Holy Cross Cemetery in Halifax.
