= William O. Heffernan =

Canadian politician

William Owen Heffernan (1796 – April 3, 1878) was a political figure in Nova Scotia. He represented Guysborough County in the Nova Scotia House of Assembly from 1859 to 1867.

He was born in Guysborough, Nova Scotia, the son of D. Heffernan, who was an assistant surgeon in the British Navy, and was educated there. Heffernan married Lucretia Wylde. He was a lieutenant-colonel in the county militia. Heffernan retired from business in 1864. In 1867, he was named to the province's Legislative Council. He died in Halifax.
