= Henry S. Jost =

Canadian politician

Henry S. Jost (May 28, 1804 – April 1, 1889) was a merchant and political figure in Nova Scotia. He represented Lunenburg township from 1851 to 1855 and Lunenburg County from 1864 to 1867 in the Nova Scotia House of Assembly.

He was born in Halifax and moved to Lunenburg in 1826, where he established himself in business. In the same year, he was named a trustee for the improvement of the common near the town. Jost served in the militia, reaching the rank of lieutenant-colonel. In 1848, he was named a justice of the peace. He supported Confederation. Jost was an unsuccessful candidate for the county seat in the provincial assembly in 1855 and 1858. He served as custos rotulorum for Lunenburg County. Jost was a prominent member of the local Freemasons. He also served as overseer of fisheries for the county. Jost died of congestion of the lungs.
