= James Dunsford =

James Wicks Dunsford (1814 – 1883) was a political figure in Canada West. He represented Victoria in the Legislative Assembly of the Province of Canada from 1861 to 1866.

He was born in Gloucester, England, the son of Reverend James Hartley Dunsford, and studied law in England. Dunsford came to Upper Canada in 1837, settling in the Newcastle District. He married Clarissa Josephine Toker. Dunsford served on the district and county councils and was also a justice of the peace, reeve for Verulam Township and police magistrate for Lindsay.
