= Mathurin Robicheau =

19th-century Canadian politician

Mathurin Robicheau (– after 1878) was a farmer and political figure in Nova Scotia. He represented Clare township from 1855 to 1859 and Digby County from 1859 to 1867 in the Nova Scotia House of Assembly.

He was the son of Aramand Robicheau and Rosalie Bourque. He served as a justice of the peace from 1856 to 1878. He was married twice: first to Charlotte Belliveau and then to Monique Comeau. In 1867, he was put in charge of the light station at Cape Ste. Marie.

His brother Frederick A. Robicheau also served in the provincial assembly.
