= William McGiverin =

- Born: 1825
- Died: 1881 (aged 55–56)
- Occupations: merchant, political figure
- Known for: mayor of St. Catharines, member of Canada Legislature
- Spouses: Jane Davidson Clark, Emma Caroline Counsell
- Children: Harold McGiverin, lawyer and politician

William McGiverin (1825–1881) was an Irish-born merchant and political figure in Canada West. He represented Lincoln in the Legislative Assembly of the Province of Canada from 1863 to 1866.

McGiverin was educated in Upper Canada. He served as warden of Lincoln County and mayor of St. Catharines. His first wife was Jane Davidson Clark. His second wife was Emma Caroline Counsell. He was the father of Harold Buchanan McGiverin, a prominent Canadian lawyer and politician.
