= William Frederick Powell =

William Frederick Powell (1826 – 1889) was a political figure in Ontario, Canada. He represented Carleton in the Legislative Assembly of the Province of Canada from 1854 to 1866 as a Conservative member.

He was born in Perth, Upper Canada, the son of Colonel James Hamilton Powell, and had moved to Bytown by 1847. Powell was among those who lobbied for a Protestant hospital in Bytown. He served as reeve for Bytown. In 1857, he married Rosanna Margaret Wallis. Powell also served as sheriff for Carleton County and was captain of an infantry company at Bells Corners, Canada West.

Powell Avenue in the Glebe area of Ottawa was named after him.

His brother John A.H. Powell served in the legislative assembly for Upper Canada.
