= John Scoble =

British abolitionist (1799–1877)

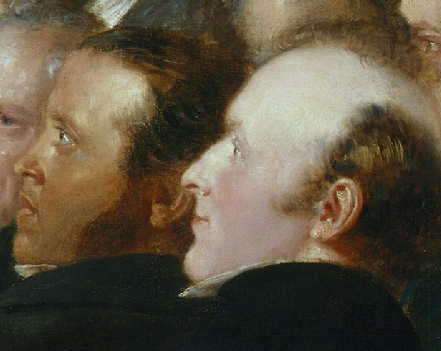
- To the left is William Knibb and to the right John Scoble - 1840
- Born: January 16, 1799; Kingsbridge, Devon, England
- Died: November 11, 1877 (aged 78); Hamilton, Ontario, Canada

John Scoble (January 16, 1799 – November 11, 1877) was a Congregational minister, British abolitionist and political figure in Canada West.

== Biography ==
Scoble was born in Kingsbridge, England in 1799 and was educated in Devon and London.

He was part of the anti-slavery movement in England and was involved in the protests against the apprenticeship system which replaced slavery in the West Indies. In 1837, Joseph Sturge organised a voyage to the West Indies, with who he invited Scoble, Thomas Harvey and Dr. Lloyd to report on the apprenticeship system. While Sturge and Harvey visited most of the British colonies in the West Indies, Scoble and Lloyd were in charge of reporting for British Guiana before returning to England. This voyage resulted in the publication of The West Indies in 1837 (London: Hamilton, Adams, and Co., 1838) by Sturge, "Letters from the West Indies by Lloyd and later Scoble would deliver a speech at a meeting at the Exeter Hall. He also was one of the leaders of the anti-indenture movement and published several reports on the indentured workers conditions on plantation in the West Indies. He helped form the British and Foreign Anti-Slavery Society in 1839 and served as secretary from 1842 to 1852.

Scoble helped revitalize the anti-slavery movement in different countries. He visited the Netherlands in 1840 en 1841 and corresponded with people such as François-André Isambert who took an active role in trying to free the French slaves. He was not on good terms, however, with the American anti-slavery advocate William Lloyd Garrison and his followers.

He came to Canada West in 1852 to try to assist the British-American Institute of Science and Industry, a vocational school for black people, which was being managed by Josiah Henson, a former fugitive slave. Disputes with trustees of the institute and with Henson interfered with his attempts to reorganize the institute's finances.

Scoble is on the right of centre at the front in this painting which is of the 1840 Anti-Slavery Convention. Move your cursor to identify him or click icon to enlarge.

In 1860, he helped prevent the deportation of John Anderson, a fugitive slave accused of murder in Missouri. In 1861, Scoble resigned from the board of trustees of the institute. In the end, the property was sold, with the proceeds going towards an integrated school in Chatham. Scoble was elected to the Legislative Assembly of the Province of Canada in West Elgin in 1863 after the election of George Macbeth was declared invalid; he was re-elected in the general election that followed later that year. He supported a decentralized federation in Canada and representation by population. Although reform-oriented, he supported Sir John A. Macdonald's leadership.

Scoble retired from politics in 1867 after failing to attain reelection in the newly minted Dominion of Canada, and all but disappeared from public life. He died in Hamilton, Ontario at the age of 79 in November 1877., and was buried in that city. As well as the cited article, press releases appeared in other USA Newspapers.

== Works ==
His published works are:

- British Guiana, London, 1838
- Texas: its claims to be recognized as an independent power, by Great Britain, London, 1839
- Hill coolies; a brief exposition of the deplorable condition of the hill coolies in British Guiana and Mauritius, London, 1840
- Liberté immédiate et absolue, ou esclavage, Paris, 1844 (with G. W. Alexander)
- Introduction to Lewis Tappan's Reply to charges brought against the American and Foreign Anti-Slavery Society (London, 1852)
- See also the great number of articles he published in the Anti-Slavery Reporter.
