= James Cowan (Ontario politician) =

Canadian farmer, businessman and political figure

James Cowan (November 3, 1803 – May 22, 1900) was a Canadian farmer, businessman and political figure.

== Biography ==
He was born in Peeblesshire, Scotland in 1803. Cowan came to Upper Canada in 1834 and settled on a farm at Galt. In 1846, he helped found the Provincial Agricultural Association and Board of Agriculture for Canada West. He purchased a share in the firm Lutz and Cook which manufactured agricultural implements and became a partner after the death of Mr. Cook. When Waterloo County was created, he was part of a group lobbying to have Galt named the chief town instead of Berlin (later Kitchener).

Cowan ran unsuccessfully for the seat for Gore division in the legislative council in 1858. In 1860, he was elected to the Legislative Assembly of the Province of Canada for South Waterloo; he was reelected in 1863. He originally supported the Reform Party but later joined the Conservatives. He ran unsuccessfully for a seat in the House of Commons of Canada in 1867. Cowan was appointed to the Dominion Board of Arbitration, later becoming chairman.

He died at Galt in 1900.
