= John Locke (Canadian politician) =

Canadian politician

John Locke (September 15, 1825 – December 12, 1873) was a Canadian merchant and Senator from Nova Scotia, Canada. He was a Liberal member of the Senate from October 23, 1867 to December 12, 1873 and was summoned to the Senate by Royal Proclamation.

He was born on Locke's Island, Nova Scotia (later the town of Lockeport), the son of Samuel Locke. Locke was educated in Liverpool, England and Shelburne, Nova Scotia. In 1851, he married Mary Elizabeth Churchill. Locke was named a justice of the peace for Shelburne in 1843. He represented Shelburne township in the Nova Scotia House of Assembly from 1851 to 1867 as a Reformer. Locke served in the province's Executive Council from 1856 to 1857 and from 1860 to 1863. He died in Lockeport at the age of 48.
