= Jean-Baptiste-Éric Dorion =

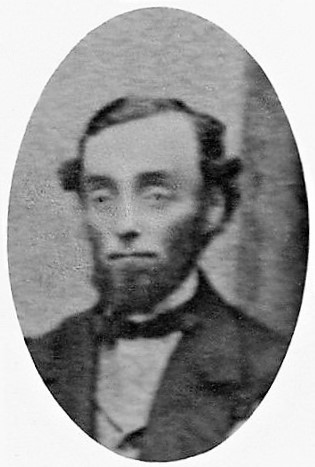
Jean-Baptiste-Éric Dorion

Jean-Baptiste-Éric Dorion (September 17, 1826 – November 1, 1866) was a journalist and political figure in Canada East.

He was born in Sainte-Anne-de-la-Pérade, Lower Canada in 1826, the son of Pierre-Antoine Dorion. In 1842, he found work as a clerk in a store at Trois-Rivières. He was editor and publisher of a small newspaper there, Gros Jean l'Escogriffe. He moved to Montreal in 1844 and helped found the Institut canadien de Montréal. In 1847, he helped launch L'Avenir with George Batchelor. In the same year, he also helped found the Société Mercantile d’Économie, an association for store clerks, and served as secretary. He supported annexation to the United States. In 1852, L'Avenir ceased publication. Shortly afterward, Dorion moved to Durham (later L'Avenir). In 1854, he was elected to the Legislative Assembly of the Province of Canada for Drummond and Athabaska. He opposed the bill to abolish seigneurial tenure because he felt it was unfair to settlers. He was defeated in the 1857 election, but reelected in 1861 and 1863. In 1862, he founded another newspaper, Le Défricheur. He opposed Confederation, because he thought that the provinces would be dominated by the federal government.

He died in L'Avenir in 1866 after suffering a heart attack.

His older brother Antoine-Aimé was a lawyer, member of the Legislative Assembly, co-premier for the Province of Canada and member of the Canadian House of Commons.
