= Robert Brown Somerville =

Robert Brown Somerville (1812–1904) was a Scottish-born merchant and political figure in Quebec. He represented Huntingdon in the Legislative Assembly of the Province of Canada from 1854 to 1866.

He was born in Athelstaneford, son of Andrew Somerville, a landowner in East Lothian, and was educated in Haddington. Somerville came to Lower Canada in 1833 and settled at Athelstan, where he operated mills and a tannery. He was a school commissioner, justice of the peace and commissioner for the Trial of Small Causes. He commanded a volunteer unit during the Lower Canada Rebellion and reached the rank of lieutenant-colonel in the local militia. He was mayor of Huntingdon and served on the councils for Hinchinbrook and Godmanchester counties. In 1840, he married Mary Susan Macnider. Somerville supported Confederation.
