= John Lewis (New Brunswick politician) =

Canadian politician

John Lewis (August 27, 1804 – October 15, 1888) was a merchant and political figure in New Brunswick. He represented Albert County in the Legislative Assembly of New Brunswick over much of the period from 1852 to 1867.

He was born in Moncton, New Brunswick, the son of Ichabod Lewis and Rebecca Read, and educated there and in Halifax, Nova Scotia. In 1829, he married Lavinia Taylor; in 1864, Lewis married Mary Dickson, the widow of Captain William Bennett, after his first wife's death. He established himself as a merchant at Hillsborough in 1831. Lewis was a justice of the peace and served as a judge in the Inferior Court of Commons Pleas. He was also president of the Albert Railway for several years. In 1867, he was named to the Legislative Council of New Brunswick.

His son William James Lewis served in the provincial assembly and the Canadian House of Commons.
