= Joseph Rymal =

Canadian politician

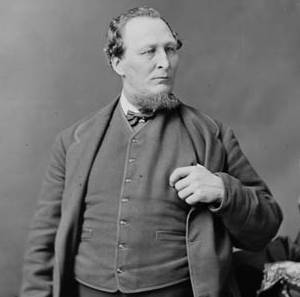
Joseph Rymal Source: Library and Archives Canada

Joseph Rymal (17 November 1821 – 15 December 1900) was a Canadian farmer and political figure. He represented Wentworth South in the House of Commons of Canada as a Liberal member from 1867 to 1882.

He was born in Barton Township, Upper Canada in 1821, the son of Jacob Rymal. His father was a Reformer in the Legislative Assembly of Upper Canada who supported William Lyon Mackenzie. In 1857 Joseph was elected to represent South Wentworth in the Legislative Assembly of the Province of Canada as a Reformer and continued to represent the riding until Confederation. He opposed Confederation but was elected to represent the riding again in the 1st Canadian Parliament and continued to represent it until 1882.

He died on his farm in Barton Township in 1900 after a short illness.
