= Colin Campbell (Nova Scotia politician) =

Canadian politician (1822–1881)

Colin Campbell (August 7, 1822 – June 25, 1881) was a merchant, ship owner, ship builder and political figure in Nova Scotia, Canada. He represented Digby County in the Nova Scotia House of Assembly from 1859 to 1867 and from 1874 to 1878.

He was born in Shelburne, Nova Scotia, the son of Colin Campbell and Maria Taylor, and moved to Weymouth with his family soon afterwards. Campbell established a general store at Weymouth and also became the owner of several ships. In 1854, he set up a shipyard there. Campbell was also involved in the lumber trade. In 1858, he married Phoebe Ann Seely. He established a dry goods and grocery business at Weymouth with George Johnson in 1871. Campbell was also president of the Weymouth Marine Insurance Company. He served as a member of the province's Executive Council from 1860 to 1863 and from 1875 to 1878. Campbell died at Weymouth at the age of 58.
