= Louis Labrèche-Viger =

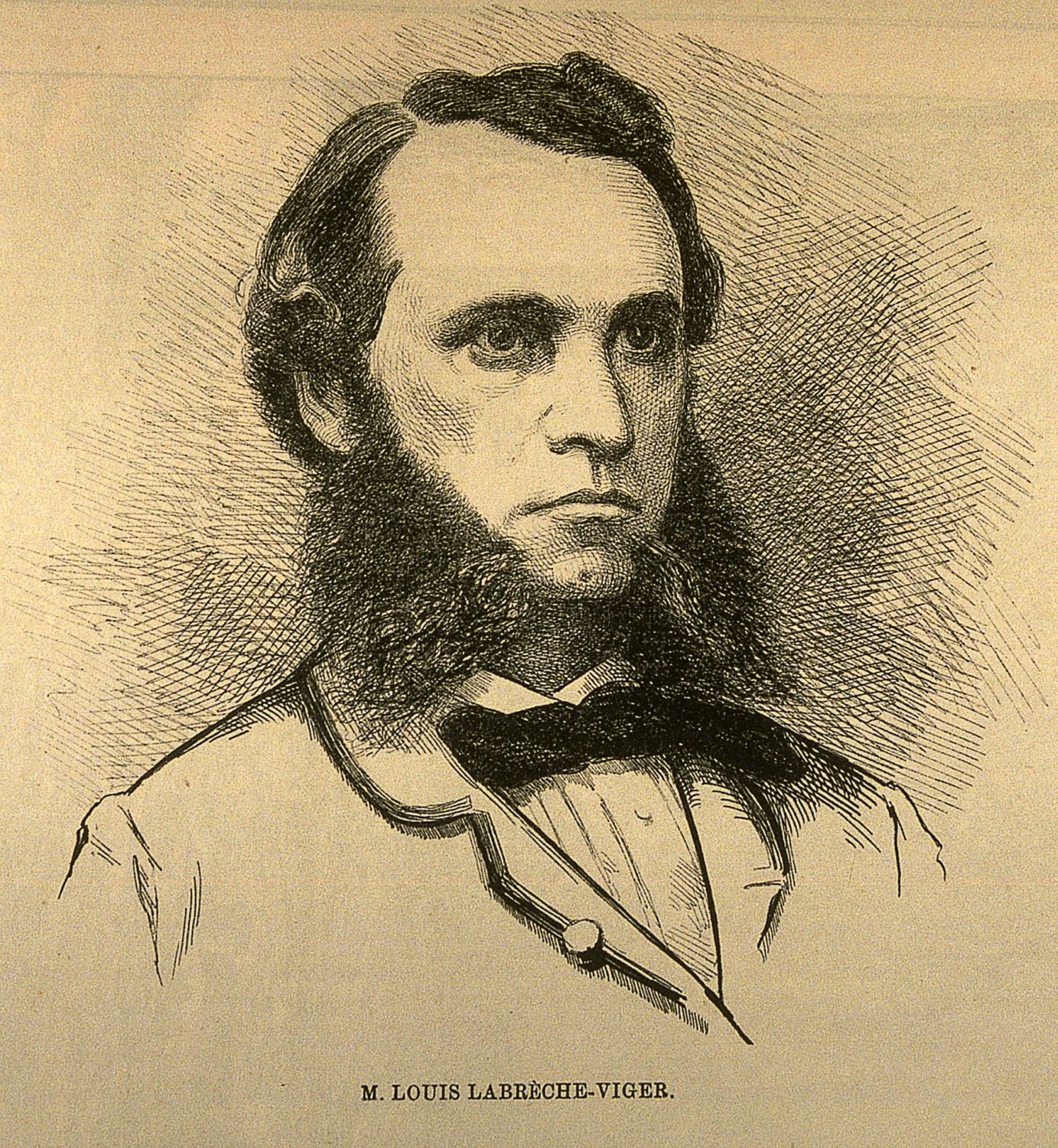
Illustration of Louis Labrèche-Viger published in 1872

Louis Labrèche-Viger (February 13, 1823 – April 27, 1872) was a Quebec businessman, journalist and political figure.

He was born Louis Labrèche in Terrebonne, Lower Canada in 1823 but later adopted the surname Labrèche-Viger after being assisted by Denis-Benjamin Viger in his early development. He studied law with Côme-Séraphin Cherrier and was called to the bar in 1848. He worked on L'Avenir and

was editor of Le Pays in 1852. He belonged to the Institut canadien de Montréal, but later left it to help found the Institut canadien-français. In 1854, he became a partner of Ephrem Hudon in a grocery business. He was elected to the Legislative Assembly of the Province of Canada for Terrebonne in 1861 and 1863, supporting the parti rouge. He voted against Confederation. He retired from politics in 1867. He was involved in the development of iron mines in the Moisie River area.

He died in Montreal in 1872.
