= Henry Pryor =

Canadian politician (1808–1892)

Henry Pryor (July 3, 1808 – October 10, 1892) was a lawyer, magistrate and political figure in Nova Scotia, Canada. He represented Halifax County in the Nova Scotia House of Assembly from 1859 to 1867.

He was born in Halifax, the son of John Pryor, a member of the provincial assembly, and Sarah Stevens. He was educated in Halifax and at King's College. Pryor went on to study law with William Blowers Bliss and was called to the Nova Scotia bar in 1831. That same year, Pryor married Eliza Phoebe Pyke, the daughter of George Pyke. He served as a lieutenant and then lieutenant-colonel in the local militia. Pryor was a member of Halifax city council from 1843 to 1845 and was mayor from 1849 to 1850, from 1853 to 1855 and from 1857 to 1859. In 1863, he married Charlotte McKie after the death of his first wife. Pryor was named a stipendiary magistrate for Halifax in 1867. In 1873, he was named Queen's Counsel. Pryor retired from his post as magistrate in 1886 and later died in Halifax at the age of 84.

His brother John was president and founder of Acadia College. His sister Louisa married James William Johnston.
