= François Évanturel =

Canadian lawyer and politician

- Born: October 22, 1821; Quebec City
- Died: March 12, 1891 (aged 69)

François Évanturel (October 22, 1821 – March 12, 1891) was a Quebec lawyer, journalist and political figure.

He was born in Quebec City in 1821, the son of a soldier in Napoleon's army who had joined the British Army after having been taken prisoner. He studied at the Petit Séminaire de Quebec from 1832 to 1841, articled in law with René-Édouard Caron and was called to the bar in 1845. He set up practice at Quebec City. Évanturel served in the local militia, becoming captain. He was a member of the Saint-Jean-Baptiste Society and helped found the Institut Canadien, serving as its first treasurer. He was elected to the Legislative Assembly of the Province of Canada in an 1855 by-election in Quebec County as a member of the parti bleu. In 1857, he was elected to the board for the North Shore Railway. He was defeated in the same year when he ran for election in two different ridings. In 1861, he was elected to represent Quebec County as a Liberal. Évanturel served in the Executive Council as minister of agriculture from 1862 to 1863; he was reelected in 1863 and served until Confederation. In 1862, he was a member of a group of Liberals who bought the newspaper Le Canadien; he became sole owner and editor in 1866. He sold the paper in 1872.

He died in Quebec City in 1891.

His son François-Eugène-Alfred went on to serve in the Ontario legislative assembly.
