= 5th Parliament of the Province of Canada =

British colonial legislature from 1854 to 1857

The 5th Parliament of the Province of Canada was summoned in August 1854, following the general election for the Legislative Assembly in July 1854. The number of seats in the Assembly had been increased by the 4th Parliament of the Province of Canada to 130, 65 for each section. Sessions were held in Quebec City until 1856 and then in Toronto. The Parliament was dissolved in November 1857.

About the time of the election of the 5th Parliament in 1854, the government negotiated the Canadian–American Reciprocity Treaty.

The 1854 election was flawed by excessive turnout due to vote fraud. In the county of Saguenay, more votes were cast than its total population. This occurred despite restrictions on the franchise through application of a property-owners' and age qualification and also due to use of voter registration. John A. Macdonald was unwilling to be drawn into granting a wide franchise and also unwilling to use old restricted franchise rules so the 1857 election would be held using complex rules and a reliance on a multitude of oaths.

During the 5th Parliament, in 1854 and 1855, measures were introduced to abolish seigneurial tenure in Canada East and the clergy reserves in Canada West. A bill was passed in 1855 to make the Legislative Council an elected body, effective the following year. The Audit Act of 1855 established an auditor of public accounts, the first auditor general and the Audit Board, a new government department, which reviewed the public accounts.

The Speaker of this parliament was Louis-Victor Sicotte.

== Members ==
=== Canada East – 65 seats ===
Riding	Member	Party	First elected/previously elected	No. of terms
Argenteuil	Sydney Robert Bellingham	Reformer	1854	1st term
Bagot	Timothée Brodeur	Reformer	1854	1st term
Beauce	Dunbar Ross	Rouge	1850, (Note: Mégantic) 1854	2nd term*
Beauharnois	Charles Daoust	Rouge	1854	1st term
Bellechasse	Jean Chabot	Reformer	1843	5th term
Bellechasse	Octave-Cyrille Fortier (1854) (Note: Jean Chabot was elected in Bellechasse and Quebec City, choosing to represent the latter; Octave-Cyrille Fortier was elected in a by-election in October 1854.)	Bleu	1854	1st term
Berthier	Pierre-Eustache Dostaler	Reformer	1854	1st term
Bonaventure	John Meagher	Reformer	1854	1st term
Chambly	Noël Darche	Rouge	1854	1st term
Champlain	Thomas Marchildon	Rouge	1851	2nd term
Châteauguay	Jacob De Witt	Rouge	1830, (Note: Beauharnois) 1842, (Note: Leinster) 1854	6th term*
Chicoutimi—Saguenay and Tadoussac	Augustin-Norbert Morin (Note: resigned for health reasons in January 1855; David Edward Price was elected in a by-election held in April 1855.)	Reformer	1830, 1841 (Note: Nicolet/Saguenay) 1851	9th term*
Chicoutimi—Saguenay and Tadoussac	David Edward Price (1855)	Conservative	1855	1st term
Compton	John Sewell Sanborn	Liberal	1850	3rd term
Deux-Montagnes	Jean-Baptiste Daoust	Reformer	1854	1st term
Dorchester	Barthélemy Pouliot	Reformer	1854	1st term
Drummond—Arthabaska	Jean-Baptiste-Éric Dorion	Rouge	1854	1st term
Gaspé	John Le Boutillier	Reformer	1833, (Note: Gaspé) 1844, (Note: Bonaventure) 1854	4th term*
Hochelaga	Joseph Laporte	Reformer	1854	1st term
Huntingdon	Robert Brown Somerville	Independent	1854	1st term
Iberville	Charles Laberge	Rouge	1854	1st term
Jacques-Cartier (Note: formerly Montreal (county))	Michel-François Valois	Rouge	1851	2nd term
Joliette	Joseph-Hilarion Jobin	Rouge	1851	2nd term
Kamouraska	Jean-Charles Chapais	Reformer	1851	2nd term
Laprairie	Thomas-Jean-Jacques Loranger	Independent	1854	1st term
L'Assomption (Note: formerly Leinster)	Joseph Papin	Rouge	1854	1st term
Laval	Pierre Labelle	Bleu	1854	1st term
Lévis	François-Xavier Lemieux	Reformer	1847	4th term
L'Islet	Charles-François Fournier	Reformer	1848	3rd term
Lotbinière	John O'Farrell	Moderate	1854	1st term
Maskinongé	Joseph-Édouard Turcotte	Reformer	1841, (Note: Saint-Maurice) 1851	4th term*
Mégantic	William Rhodes	Reformer	1854	1st term
East Missisquoi	James Moir Ferres	Tory	1854	1st term
West Missisquoi	Hannibal Hodges Whitney	Reformer	1854	1st term
Montcalm	Joseph Dufresne	Bleu	1854	1st term
Montmagny	Louis-Napoléon Casault	Moderate	1854	1st term
Montmorency	Joseph-Édouard Cauchon	Reformer	1844	4th term
Montreal	Antoine-Aimé Dorion	Rouge	1854	1st term
Montreal	Luther Hamilton Holton	Rouge	1854	1st term
Montreal	John Young	Rouge	1851	2nd term
Napierville	Jacques-Olivier Bureau	Rouge	1854	1st term
Nicolet	Thomas Fortier	Reformer	1848	3rd term
Ottawa	Alanson Cooke	Rouge	1854	1st term
Pontiac	John Egan (Note: died in July 1857; George Bryson was elected in a by-election in October 1857.)	Reformer	1848	3rd term
Pontiac	George Bryson (1857)	Conservative	1857	1st term
Portneuf	Joseph-Élie Thibaudeau	Reformer	1854	1st term
Quebec County	Pierre-Joseph-Olivier Chauveau (Note: resigned his seat to accept an appointment; François Évanturel was elected in a by-election in August 1855.)	Reformer	1844	4th term
Quebec County	François Évanturel (1855)	Bleu	1855	1st term
Quebec City	Jean Chabot (Note: resigned to accept an appointment as judge; Georges-Honoré Simard was elected in a by-election in October 1856.)	Reformer	1843	5th term
Quebec City	Georges-Honoré Simard (1856)	Bleu	1856	1st term
Quebec City	Jean Blanchet (Note: resigned due to ill health in 1857; George Okill Stuart was elected in a by-election in April 1857.)	Reformer	1834, 1854	2nd term*
Quebec City	George Okill Stuart (1857)	Conservative	1851, 1857	2nd term*
Quebec City	Charles Joseph Alleyn	Conservative	1854	1st term
Richelieu	Jean-Baptiste Guévremont	Moderate	1854	1st term
Rimouski	Joseph-Charles Taché (Note: resigned his seat in 1857; Michel Guillaume Baby was elected in a by-election in February 1857.)	Reformer	1848	3rd term
Rimouski	Michel Guillaume Baby (1857)	Bleu	1857	1st term
Rouville	Joseph-Napoléon Poulin (Note: resigned his seat to run unsuccessfully for a seat on the Legislative Council; William Henry Chaffers was elected in a by-election in October 1856.)	Reformer	1851	2nd term
Rouville	William Henry Chaffers (1856)	Rouge	1856	1st term
Saguenay	Pierre-Gabriel Huot	Independent	1854	1st term
St. Hyacinthe	Louis-Victor Sicotte	Liberal	1851	2nd term
Saint-Jean	François Bourassa	Rouge	1854	1st term
Saint-Maurice	Louis-Léon Lesieur Désaulniers	Reformer	1854	1st term
Shefford	Lewis Thomas Drummond	Liberal	1844	4th term
Sherbrooke	Alexander Tilloch Galt	Independent	1849, 1853	3rd term*
Sherbrooke (county) and Wolfe	William Locker Pickmore Felton	Conservative	1854	1st term
Soulanges	Luc-Hyacinthe Masson	Reformer	1854	1st term
Stanstead	Timothy Lee Terrill	Moderate	1852	2nd term
Témiscouata	Benjamin Dionne	Reformer	1854	1st term
Terrebonne	Gédéon-Mélasippe Prévost (Note: resigned his seat in 1857 to allow Louis-Siméon Morin to be elected.)	Rouge	1854	1st term
Terrebonne	Louis-Siméon Morin (1857)	Bleu	1857	1st term
Trois-Rivières	Antoine Polette	Reformer	1848	3rd term
Vaudreuil	Jean-Baptiste Mongenais	Reformer	1848	3rd term
Verchères	George-Étienne Cartier	Reformer	1848	3rd term
Yamaska	Ignace Gill	Conservative	1854	1st term

=== Canada West – 65 seats ===
Riding	Member	Party	First elected/previously elected	No. of terms
Brant	Daniel McKerlie (Note: David Christie appealed the election of Daniel McKerlie and was declared elected in March 1855.)	Conservative	1854	1st term
Brant	David Christie (1855)	Clear Grit	1851, 1855	2nd term*
West Brant	Herbert Biggar	Reformer	1854	1st term
Brockville	George Crawford	Conservative	1851	2nd term
Bytown	Agar Yielding	Conservative	1854	1st term
Carleton	William F. Powell	Conservative	1854	1st term
Cornwall	Roderick McDonald	Clear Grit	1851	2nd term
Dundas	John Pliny Crysler	Conservative	1848, 1854	2nd term*
East Durham	Francis H. Burton	Conservative	1854	1st term
West Durham	Henry Munro	Reformer	1854	1st term
East Elgin	George Southwick	Reformer	1854	1st term
West Elgin	George Macbeth	Conservative	1854	1st term
Essex	Arthur Rankin	Conservative	1854	1st term
Frontenac	Henry Smith, Jr	Conservative	1841	5th term
Glengarry	John Sandfield Macdonald	Clear Grit	1841	5th term
Grenville	William Patrick	Reformer	1851	2nd term
Grey	George Jackson	Reformer	1854	1st term
Haldimand	William Lyon Mackenzie	Reformer	1828, (Note: York) 1851	6th term*
Halton	George King Chisholm	Conservative	1854	1st term
Hamilton	Allan Napier MacNab	Conservative	1830	8th term
North Hastings	Edmund Murney (Note: resigned; George Benjamin was elected to the seat in a by-election in 1856.)	Conservative	1836, 1842, 1851	5th term*
North Hastings	George Benjamin (1856)	Conservative	1856	1st term
South Hastings	Billa Flint	Clear Grit	1847, 1854	2nd term*
Huron & Bruce	William Cayley	Tory	1846, 1854	3rd term*
Kent	Edwin Larwill	Conservative	1854	1st term
Kingston	John A. Macdonald	Conservative	1844	4th term
Lambton	George Brown	Reformer	1851	2nd term
North Lanark	Robert Bell	Reformer	1854	1st term
South Lanark	James Shaw	Conservative	1851	2nd term
North Leeds & Grenville	Basil R. Church	Reformer	1854	1st term
South Leeds	Jesse Delong	Reformer	1854	1st term
Lennox and Addington	David Roblin	Reformer	1854	1st term
Lincoln	William Hamilton Merritt	Clear Grit	1844	4th term
London	John Wilson	Conservative	1854	1st term
East Middlesex	William E. Niles	Reformer	1854	1st term
West Middlesex	John Scatcherd	Clear Grit	1854	1st term
Niagara (town)	Joseph Curran Morrison	Reformer	1852	2nd term
Norfolk	John Rolph	Clear Grit	1851	2nd term
East Northumberland	James Ross	Reformer	1854	1st term
West Northumberland	Sidney Smith	Reformer	1854	1st term
North Ontario	Joseph Gould	Reformer	1854	1st term
South Ontario	John McVeagh Lumsden	Clear Grit	1854	1st term
North Oxford	Donald Matheson	Clear Grit	1854	1st term
South Oxford	Ephraim Cook (Note: Francis Hincks, elected in both South Oxford & Renfrew, chose to sit for Renfrew; Ephraim Cook elected in October 1854)	Clear Grit	1854	1st term
Peel (Note: formerly West York)	James Cox Aikins	Clear Grit	1854	1st term
Perth	Thomas Mayne Daly	Reformer	1854	1st term
Peterborough	John Langton (Note: resigned his seat to become auditor general; Wilson Seymour Conger was elected in a by-election held in 1856.)	Conservative	1851	2nd term
Peterborough	Wilson Seymour Conger (1856)	Conservative	1856	1st term
Prescott	Henry Wellesly McCann	Conservative	1854	1st term
Prince Edward	David Barker Stevenson	Conservative	1848	3rd term
Renfrew	Francis Hincks (Note: resigned his seat in November 1855; John Supple was elected in a by-election in the following year.)	Reformer	1841, 1848	4th term*
Renfrew	John Supple (1856)	Reformer	1856	1st term
Russell	George Byron Lyon-Fellowes	Conservative	1848	3rd term
North Simcoe	Angus Morrison	Reformer	1854	1st term
South Simcoe	William Benjamin Robinson	Conservative	1844	4th term
Stormont	William Mattice	Clear Grit	1851	2nd term
Toronto	John George Bowes	Conservative	1854	1st term
Toronto	John Hillyard Cameron	Conservative	1846, (Note: Cornwall) 1854	3rd term*
Victoria	James Smith	Reformer	1848	3rd term
North Waterloo	Michael Hamilton Foley	Reformer	1854	1st term
South Waterloo	Robert Ferris	Clear Grit	1854	1st term
Welland	John Fraser	Reformer	1854	1st term
North Wellington	William Clarke	Conservative	1854	1st term
South Wellington	Adam Johnston Fergusson Blair	Reformer	1849	3rd term
North Wentworth	Robert Spence	Independent	1854	1st term
South Wentworth	Samuel B Freeman	Reformer	1854	1st term
East York	Amos Wright	Reformer	1851	2nd term
North York	Joseph Hartman	Reformer	1851	2nd term
South York	John William Gamble	Tory	1851	2nd term
