= 6th Parliament of the Province of Canada =

British colonial legislature from 1857 to 1861

The 6th Parliament of the Province of Canada was summoned in January 1858, following the general election for the Legislative Assembly in December 1857. Sessions were held in Toronto in 1858 and then in Quebec City from 1859. The Parliament was dissolved in May 1861.

The 1857 election was flawed by voter fraud. John A. Macdonald had been unwilling to be drawn into granting a wide franchise and also been unwilling to use old restricted franchise rules so the 6th Parliament of the Province of Canada was elected using complex rules and a reliance on a multitude of oaths. In Quebec City, it was reported that about three times as many votes were cast as the number of qualified voters. Widespread voter fraud occurred in nine ridings in Canada East and three ridings in Canada West. Grown sons living at home and others who were neither property owners nor renters passed themselves off as renters and voted. When the 6th Parliament began its first legislative session, in January 1858, the Speech from the Throne gave the government's intent to secure proper voter registration and protect the value of the vote of qualified voters.

The 1858 parliamentary session was one of the longest and nastiest in Canadian history. It opened in January 1858 just as news arrived from London that Queen Victoria had chosen Ottawa as the permanent seat for the government of the Province of Canada. In August 1858 the Macdonald-Cartier ministry carried out the divisive "double shuffle" that allowed the ministry to stay in power without facing by-elections.

The Speaker of the Legislative Assembly was Sir Henry Smith.

== Electoral system ==
Each voter could cast as many votes as there were seats to fill in the district (First-past-the-post voting).

Montreal and Quebec City elected three members; Toronto elected two members. All others elected just one member. (Previous to the next election, all districts were changed to single-member districts.)

== Members ==
=== Canada East – 65 seats ===
Riding	Member	Party	First elected/previously elected	No. of terms
Argenteuil	Sydney Robert Bellingham (Note: election was declared invalid after an appeal; John Joseph Caldwell Abbott was declared elected in March 1860 after an inquiry by a committee of the Legislative Assembly.)	Reformer	1854	2nd term
Argenteuil	John Joseph Caldwell Abbott (1860)	Liberal	1860	1st term
Bagot	Maurice Laframboise	Rouge	1857	1st term
Beauce	Dunbar Ross	Rouge	1850, (Note: Mégantic) 1854	3rd term*
Beauharnois	Gédéon Ouimet	Bleu	1857	1st term
Bellechasse	Octave-Cyrille Fortier	Bleu	1854	2nd term
Berthier	Eugène-Urgel Piché	Rouge	1857	1st term
Bonaventure	John Meagher	Reformer	1854	2nd term
Brome	James Moir Ferres	Conservative	1854	2nd term
Chambly	Louis Lacoste	Bleu	1834, 1843, 1849, 1857	6th term*
Champlain	Joseph-Édouard Turcotte	Bleu	1841, (Note: Saint-Maurice) 1851	5th term*
Charlevoix	Cléophe Cimon	Bleu	1857	1st term
Châteauguay	Henry Starnes	Conservative	1857	1st term
Chicoutimi—Saguenay	David Edward Price	Conservative	1855	2nd term
Compton	John Henry Pope	Conservative	1857	1st term
Deux-Montagnes	Jean-Baptiste Daoust	Reformer	1854	2nd term
Dorchester	Hector-Louis Langevin	Bleu	1857	1st term
Drummond—Arthabaska	Christopher Dunkin	Conservative	1857	1st term
Gaspé	John Le Boutillier	Reformer	1833, (Note: Gaspé) 1844, (Note: Bonaventure) 1854	5th term*
Hochelaga	Joseph Laporte	Bleu	1854	2nd term
Huntingdon	Robert Brown Somerville	Independent	1854	2nd term
Iberville	Charles Laberge	Rouge	1854	2nd term
Jacques-Cartier	François-Zéphirin Tassé	Bleu	1857	1st term
Joliette	Joseph-Hilarion Jobin	Rouge	1851	3rd term
Kamouraska	Jean-Charles Chapais	Reformer	1851	3rd term
L'Assomption	Louis Archambeault	Bleu	1857	1st term
L'Islet	Louis-Bonaventure Caron (Note: election was declared invalid; Charles-François Fournier was declared elected in June 1858.)	Rouge	1857	1st term
L'Islet	Charles-François Fournier (1858)	Reformer	1847, 1858	4th term*
Laprairie	Thomas-Jean-Jacques Loranger	Bleu	1857	1st term
Laval	Pierre Labelle	Bleu	1854	2nd term
Lévis	François-Xavier Lemieux	Liberal-Conservative	1847	5th term
Lotbinière	John O'Farrell (Note: election was declared invalid; Lewis Thomas Drummond was elected in a by-election in October 1858.)	Conservative	1854	2nd term
Lotbinière	Lewis Thomas Drummond (1858)	Liberal	1844, (Note: Montreal/Portneuf/Shefford) 1858	5th term*
Maskinongé	Louis-Honoré Gauvreau (Note: died in office in 1858; George Caron was elected in a by-election in December 1858.)	Bleu	1857	1st term
Maskinongé	George Caron (1858)	Bleu	1858	1st term
Mégantic	Noël Hébert	Rouge	1857	1st term
Missisquoi	Hannibal Hodges Whitney	Conservative	1854	2nd term
Montcalm	Joseph Dufresne	Bleu	1854	2nd term
Montmagny	Joseph-Octave Beaubien	Bleu	1857	1st term
Montmorency	Joseph-Édouard Cauchon	Bleu	1844	5th term
Montreal	John Rose	Conservative	1857	1st term
Montreal	Antoine-Aimé Dorion	Rouge	1854	2nd term
Montreal	Thomas D'Arcy McGee	Rouge	1857	1st term
Napierville	Jacques-Olivier Bureau	Rouge	1854	2nd term
Nicolet	Joseph Gaudet	Bleu	1857	1st term
Ottawa	Denis-Émery Papineau	Rouge	1857	1st term
Pontiac	Edmund Heath	Conservative	1857	1st term
Portneuf	Joseph-Élie Thibaudeau	Reformer	1854	2nd term
Quebec County	Charles Panet	Bleu	1857	1st term
Quebec City	Charles Joseph Alleyn	Conservative	1857	1st term
Quebec City	Georges-Honoré Simard	Bleu	1856	2nd term
Quebec City	Hippolyte Dubord (Note: election was declared invalid in April 1860; Pierre-Gabriel Huot was elected in a by-election in May 1860.)	Bleu	1834, 1857	2nd term*
Quebec City	Pierre-Gabriel Huot (1860)	Rouge	1854, (Note: Saguenay) 1860	2nd term*
Richelieu	Jacques-Félix Sincennes	Bleu	1857	1st term
Richmond—Wolfe (Note: formerly Sherbrooke (county) and Wolfe)	William Hoste Webb	Conservative	1857	1st term
Rimouski	Michel-Guillaume Baby	Bleu	1857	2nd term
Rouville	Thomas Edmund Campbell	Conservative	1857	1st term
St. Hyacinthe	Louis-Victor Sicotte	Bleu	1851	3rd term
Saint-Jean	François Bourassa	Rouge	1854	2nd term
Saint-Maurice	Louis-Léon Lesieur Desaulniers	Bleu	1854	2nd term
Shefford	Lewis Thomas Drummond (Note: defeated in a by-election in Shefford in September 1858 after he was appointed to cabinet; Asa Belknap Foster was elected to the seat.)	Liberal	1844	5th term
Shefford	Asa Belknap Foster (1858)	Conservative	1858	1st term
Shefford	Lucius Seth Huntington (1860)	Liberal	1860	1st term
Sherbrooke	Alexander Tilloch Galt	Liberal-Conservative	1849, 1853	4th term*
Soulanges	Dominique-Amable Coutlée	Bleu	1857	1st term
Stanstead	Timothy Lee Terrill	Moderate	1852	3rd term
Témiscouata	Benjamin Dionne	Reformer	1854	2nd term
Terrebonne	Louis-Siméon Morin	Bleu	1857	2nd term
Trois-Rivières	William McDonell Dawson	Conservative	1857	1st term
Vaudreuil	Robert Unwin Harwood (Note: resigned his seat to run for a seat on the Legislative Council; Jean-Baptiste Mongenais was elected in a by-election in November 1860.)	Conservative	1857	1st term
Vaudreuil	Jean-Baptiste Mongenais (1860)	Bleu	1848, 1860	4th term*
Verchères	George-Étienne Cartier	Bleu	1848	4th term
Yamaska	Ignace Gill	Conservative	1854	2nd term

=== Canada West – 65 seats ===
Riding	Member	Party	First elected/previously elected	No. of terms
East Brant	David Christie (Note: resigned after being elected to the Legislative Council in 1858; Hugh Finlayson was elected in a by-election in 1858.)	Reformer	1855	2nd term
East Brant	Hugh Finlayson (1858)	Reformer	1858	1st term
West Brant	Herbert Biggar	Reformer	1854	2nd term
Brockville	George Sherwood	Conservative	1841, 1857	4th term*
Carleton	William F. Powell	Conservative	1854	2nd term
Cornwall	John Sandfield Macdonald	Reformer	1841	6th term
Dundas	James William Cook	Reformer	1857	1st term
East Durham	Francis H. Burton	Conservative	1854	2nd term
West Durham	Henry Munro	Reformer	1854	2nd term
East Elgin	Leonidas Burwell	Reformer	1857	1st term
West Elgin	George Macbeth	Conservative	1854	2nd term
Essex	John McLeod	Conservative	1857	1st term
Frontenac	Henry Smith, Jr	Conservative	1841	6th term
Glengarry	Donald Alexander Macdonald	Reformer	1857	1st term
Grenville	William Patrick	Reformer	1851	3rd term
Grey	John Sheridan Hogan (Note: missing from 1 December 1859; his murdered body was discovered in the Don River.)	Independent Liberal	1857	1st term
Grey	J.T. Purdy (1861)	Reformer	1861	1st term
Haldimand	William Lyon Mackenzie (Note: resigned his seat in August 1858; Michael Harcourt was elected in an October 1858 by-election)	Reformer	1828, (Note: York) 1851	7th term*
Haldimand	Michael Harcourt (1858)	Reformer	1858	1st term
Halton	John White	Reformer	1851, 1857	2nd term*
Hamilton	Isaac Buchanan	Independent	1841, 1857	2nd term*
North Hastings	George Benjamin	Conservative	1856	2nd term
South Hastings	Lewis Wallbridge	Reformer	1857	1st term
Huron & Bruce	John Holmes	Reformer	1857	1st term
Kent	Archibald McKellar	Reformer	1857	1st term
Kingston	John A. Macdonald	Liberal-Conservative	1844	5th term
Lambton	Malcolm Cameron (Note: resigned after being elected to the Legislative Council in 1860; Hope Fleming Mackenzie was elected to the seat in a by-election in 1860.)	Clear Grit	1836, (Note: Lanark/Kent/Huron) 1857	6th term*
Lambton	Hope Fleming Mackenzie (1860)	Reformer	1860	1st term
North Lanark	Robert Bell	Reformer	1854	2nd term
South Lanark	Andrew W. Playfair	Independent	1857	1st term
North Leeds & Grenville	Basil R. Church (Note: died in 1858; Ogle Robert Gowan was elected in a by-election later that year.)	Reformer	1854	2nd term
North Leeds & Grenville	Ogle Robert Gowan (1858)	Conservative	1834, 1844, 1858	4th term*
South Leeds	Benjamin Tett	Conservative	1857	1st term
Lennox and Addington	David Roblin	Reformer	1854	2nd term
Lincoln	William Hamilton Merritt (Note: resigned after being elected to the Legislative Council in 1860; J.C. Rykert was elected to the seat in a by-election in 1860.)	Reformer	1844	5th term
Lincoln	John Charles Rykert (1860)	Reformer	1860	1st term
London	John Carling	Liberal-Conservative	1857	1st term
East Middlesex	Marcus Talbot (Note: died in March 1860; Robert Craik was elected to his seat in 1860.)	Conservative	1857	1st term
East Middlesex	Robert Craik (1860)	Reformer	1860	1st term
West Middlesex	John Scatcherd (Note: died in June 1858; Angus Peter McDonald was elected to his seat in 1858.)	Clear Grit	1854	2nd term
West Middlesex	Angus Peter McDonald (1858)	Liberal-Conservative	1858	1st term
Niagara (town)	John Simpson	Conservative	1857	1st term
Norfolk	Walker Powell	Reformer	1857	1st term
East Northumberland	John R Clark	Reformer	1857	1st term
West Northumberland	Sidney Smith	Reformer	1854	2nd term
North Ontario	Joseph Gould	Reformer	1854	2nd term
South Ontario	Oliver Mowat	Reformer	1857	1st term
Ottawa	Richard William Scott	Liberal-Conservative	1857	1st term
North Oxford	George Brown (Note: George Brown, elected in both North Oxford and Toronto, chose to sit for Toronto; William McDougall elected in a May 1858 by-election)	Reformer	1851	3rd term
North Oxford	William McDougall (1858)	Reformer	1858	1st term
South Oxford	George Skeffington Connor	Reformer	1857	1st term
Peel	James Cox Aikins	Clear Grit	1854	2nd term
Perth	Thomas Mayne Daly	Liberal-Conservative	1854	2nd term
Peterborough	Thomas Short	Reformer	1857	1st term
Prescott	Henry Wellesly McCann	Conservative	1854	2nd term
Prince Edward	Willet C Dorland	Conservative	1857	1st term
Renfrew	John Lorn McDougall (Note: resigned his seat to allow William Cayley to be elected in a by-election held in March 1858.)	Reformer	1857	1st term
Renfrew	William Cayley (1858)	Tory	1846, (Note: Huron) 1854, (Note: Huron) 1858	4th term*
Russell	George Byron Lyon-Fellowes (Note: election declared fraudulent in October 1859; John W Loux elected in a December 1859 by-election.)	Conservative	1848	4th term
Russell	John W Loux (1859)	Independent	1859	1st term
North Simcoe	Angus Morrison	Reform	1854	2nd term
South Simcoe	Thomas Roberts Ferguson	Conservative	1857	1st term
Stormont	William D. Mattice	Reformer	1851	3rd term
Toronto	George Brown	Reformer	1851	3rd term
Toronto	John Beverley Robinson	Conservative	1857	1st term
Victoria	John Cameron	Conservative	1857	1st term
North Waterloo	Michael Hamilton Foley	Reform	1854	2nd term
South Waterloo	William Scott	Conservative	1857	1st term
Welland	Gilbert McMicken	Reformer	1857	1st term
North Wellington	Charles Allan (Note: election appealed; ames Ross was elected in an 1859 by-election.)	Clear Grit	1857	1st term
North Wellington	James Ross (1859)	Reformer	1854, (Note: East Northumberland) 1859	2nd term*
South Wellington	David Stirton	Reformer	1857	1st term
North Wentworth	William Notman	Reformer	1848, (Note: Middlesex) 1857	2nd term*
South Wentworth	Joseph Rymal	Reformer	1857	1st term
East York	Amos Wright	Reformer	1851	3rd term
North York	Joseph Hartman (Note: died in November 1859; Adam Wilson was elected to his seat in 1860.)	Reformer	1851	3rd term
North York	Adam Wilson (1860)	Reformer	1860	1st term
West York (Note: formerly South York; prior to that, 1st York)	William Pearce Howland	Reformer	1857	1st term
