= 4th Parliament of the Province of Canada =

British colonial legislature from 1851 to 1854

The 4th Parliament of the Province of Canada was summoned in December 1851, following the general election for the Legislative Assembly in October 1851. Sessions were held in Quebec City. The Parliament was dissolved in June 1854.

The Speaker of the Legislative Assembly was John Sandfield Macdonald.

== Members ==
=== Canada East – 42 seats ===
Riding	Member	Party	First elected/previously elected	No. of terms
Beauharnois	Ovide Le Blanc	Reformer	1851	1st term
Bellechasse	Jean Chabot	Reformer	1843	4th term
Berthier	Joseph-Hilarion Jobin	Patriote	1851	1st term
Bonaventure	David Le Boutillier	Reformer	1851	1st term
Chambly	Louis Lacoste	Reformer	1843, (Note: Montreal) 1849	3rd term*
Champlain	Thomas Marchildon	Liberal	1851	1st term
Deux-Montagnes	William Henry Scott (Note: died in 1851; Louis-Joseph Papineau was elected in a by-election held in July 1852.)	Reformer	1844	3rd term
Deux-Montagnes	Louis-Joseph Papineau (1852)	Rouge	1808, (Note: Kent/Montreal West) 1848, (Note: Saint-Maurice) 1852	13th term*
Dorchester	François-Xavier Lemieux	Reformer	1847	3rd term
Drummond	John McDougall	Conservative	1851	1st term
Gaspé	Robert Christie	Independent	1841	4th term
Huntingdon	Jean-Baptiste Varin	Reformer	1851	1st term
Kamouraska	Jean-Charles Chapais	Reformer	1851	1st term
Leinster	Louis-Michel Viger	Reformer	1830, (Note: Chambly) 1842, (Note: Nicolet) 1848	5th term*
L'Islet	Charles-François Fournier	Reformer	1848	2nd term
Lotbinière	Joseph Laurin	Reformer	1844	3rd term
Mégantic	John Greaves Clapham	Tory	1834, 1851	2nd term*
Missisquoi	Seneca Paige	Moderate	1851	1st term
Montmorency	Joseph-Édouard Cauchon	Reformer	1844	3rd term
Montreal	John Young	Rouge	1851	1st term
Montreal	William Badgley	Tory	1847	3rd term
Montreal County	Michel-François Valois	Rouge	1851	1st term
Nicolet	Thomas Fortier	Reformer	1848	2nd term
Ottawa	John Egan	Reformer	1848	2nd term
Portneuf	Ulric-Joseph Tessier	Reformer	1851	1st term
Quebec County	Pierre-Joseph-Olivier Chauveau	Reformer	1844	3rd term
Quebec City	Hippolyte Dubord	Independent	1834, 1851	2nd term*
Quebec City	George Okill Stuart	Conservative	1851	1st term
Richelieu	Antoine-Némèse Gouin	Reformer	1851	1st term
Rimouski	Joseph-Charles Taché	Reformer	1848	2nd term
Rouville	Joseph-Napoléon Poulin	Reformer	1851	1st term
Saguenay	Marc-Pascal de Sales Laterrière	Reformer	1845	3rd term
St. Hyacinthe	Louis-Victor Sicotte	Liberal	1851	1st term
Saint-Maurice	Joseph-Édouard Turcotte	Reformer	1841, 1851	3rd term*
Shefford	Lewis Thomas Drummond	Liberal	1844	3rd term
Sherbrooke	Edward Short (Note: resigned to accept an appointment in November 1852; Alexander Tilloch Galt was elected in a by-election held in March 1853.)	Moderate	1851	1st term
Sherbrooke	Alexander Tilloch Galt (1853)	Independent	1849, 1853	2nd term*
Sherbrooke (county)	John Sewell Sanborn	Liberal	1850	2nd term
Stanstead	Hazard Bailey Terrill (Note: died in 1852; his brother, Timothy Lee Terrill, was elected to his seat in a by-election held in November 1852.)	Moderate	1851	1st term
Stanstead	Timothy Lee Terrill (1852)	Moderate	1852	1st term
Terrebonne	Augustin-Norbert Morin	Reformer	1830, 1841 (Note: Nicolet/Saguenay) 1851	8th term*
Trois-Rivières	Antoine Polette	Reformer	1848	2nd term
Vaudreuil	Jean-Baptiste Mongenais	Reformer	1848	2nd term
Verchères	George-Étienne Cartier	Reformer	1848	2nd term
Yamaska	Pierre-Benjamin Dumoulin	Reformer	1851	1st term

=== Canada West – 42 seats ===
Riding	Member	Party	First elected/previously elected	No. of terms
Brockville	George Crawford	Conservative	1851	1st term
Bytown	Daniel McLachlin	Reformer	1851	1st term
Carleton	Edward Malloch	Independent	1848	2nd term
Cornwall	Roderick McDonald	Independent	1851	1st term
Dundas	Jesse W. Rose	Reformer	1851	1st term
Durham	James Smith	Reformer	1848	2nd term
Essex	John Prince	Independent	1836	5th term
Frontenac	Henry Smith, Jr	Conservative	1841	4th term
Glengarry	John Sandfield Macdonald	Reformer	1841	4th term
Grenville	William Patrick	Reformer	1851	1st term
Haldimand	William Lyon Mackenzie	Reformer	1828, (Note: York) 1851	5th term*
Halton	John White	Reformer	1851	1st term
Hamilton	Allan Napier MacNab	Conservative	1830	7th term
Hastings	Edmund Murney	Liberal-Conservative	1836, 1842, 1851	4th term*
Huron	Malcolm Cameron	Reformer	1841	4th term
Kent	George Brown	Reformer	1851	1st term
Kingston	John A. Macdonald	Conservative	1844	3rd term
Lanark	James Shaw	Conservative	1851	1st term
Leeds	William Buell Richards (Note: named judge in June 1853; Jesse Delong elected in a July 1853 by-election.)	Reformer	1848	2nd term
Leeds	Jesse Delong (1853)	Reformer	1853	1st term
Lennox and Addington	Benjamin Seymour	Conservative	1844	3rd term
Lincoln	William Hamilton Merritt	Reformer	1844	3rd term
London	Thomas C. Dixon	Conservative	1851	1st term
Middlesex	Crowell Willson	Independent	1851	1st term
Niagara (town)	Francis Hincks (Note: Francis Hincks was elected in both Niagara and Oxford, choosing to sit for Oxford; Joseph Curran Morrison was elected in an 1852 by-election for Niagara.)	Reformer	1851	1st term
Niagara (town)	Joseph Curran Morrison (1852)	Reformer	1848, (Note: West York) 1852	2nd term*
Norfolk	John Rolph	Clear Grit	1836, 1851	2nd term*
Northumberland	Asa A Burnham	Independent	1851	1st term
Oxford	Francis Hincks	Reformer	1841, 1848	3rd term*
Peterborough	John Langton	Conservative	1851	1st term
Prescott	Thomas Hall Johnston	Independent	1848	2nd term
Prince Edward	David Barker Stevenson	Conservative	1848	2nd term
Russell	George Byron Lyon-Fellowes	Independent	1848	2nd term
Simcoe	William Benjamin Robinson	Conservative	1844	3rd term
Stormont	William Mattice	Clear Grit	1851	1st term
Toronto	George Percival Ridout	Independent	1851	1st term
Toronto	George Percival Ridout	Conservative	1851	1st term
Toronto	William Henry Boulton (Note: election declared void in March 1853; Henry Sherwood elected in an April 1853 by-election)	Conservative	1844	3rd term
Toronto	Henry Sherwood (1853)	Conservative	1836, (Note: Brockville) 1843, 1853	5th term*
Waterloo	Adam Johnston Fergusson	Reform	1849	2nd term
Welland	Thomas Clark Street	Conservative	1851	1st term
Wentworth	David Christie	Reformer	1851	1st term
East York	Amos Wright	Reformer	1851	1st term
North York	Joseph Hartman	Reformer	1851	1st term
South York	John William Gamble	Tory	1838, 1851	2nd term*
West York	George Wright	Reformer	1851	1st term
