= 3rd Parliament of the Province of Canada =

British colonial legislature from 1848 to 1851

The 3rd Parliament of the Province of Canada was summoned in 1848, following the general election for the Legislative Assembly in January 1848. The first session was held at Montreal, Canada East. In 1849, rioters protesting the Rebellion Losses Bill burned the parliament buildings. After briefly sitting at Bonsecours Market and Freemason's Hall, the remaining sessions were held in Toronto. The Parliament was dissolved on November 6, 1851.

During the 1849 session of this parliament, a number of important bills were passed:

- the Act to provide for the Indemnification of Parties in Lower Canada whose Property was destroyed during the Rebellion in the years 1837 and 1838 (Rebellion Losses Bill)
- the Baldwin Act, also known as the Municipal Corporations Act, which replaced the local government system based on district councils in Canada West by government at the county level. It also granted more autonomy to townships, villages, towns and cities.
- the Amnesty Act which offered pardons to all those involved in the Rebellions of 1837–8.
- a consolidation of electoral laws which prohibited women from voting.

In 1850, legislation was passed to regulate the operation of the postal service and to establish a post on the Executive Council for the Postmaster General for the Province of Canada.

The Speaker of this parliament was Augustin Norbert Morin.

== Members ==
=== Canada East - 42 seats ===
Riding	Member	Party	First elected/previously elected	No. of terms
Beauharnois	Jacob De Witt	Reformer	1830, 1842	5th term*
Bellechasse	Augustin-Norbert Morin	Patriote	1830, 1841, (Note: Nicolet) 1842	7th term*
Berthier	David Morrison Armstrong	Patriote	1841	3rd term
Bonaventure	William Cuthbert	Tory	1848	1st term
Chambly	Pierre Beaubien	Patriote	1843, (Note: Montreal) 1848	2nd term*
Chambly	Louis Lacoste (1849)	Reformer	1843,{ 1849	2nd term*
Champlain	Louis Guillet	Patriote	1844	2nd term
Deux-Montagnes	William Henry Scott	Reformer	1829, (Note: York) 1844	5th term*
Dorchester	François-Xavier Lemieux	Patriote	1847	2nd term
Drummond	Robert Nugent Watts	Conservative	1841	3rd term
Gaspé	Robert Christie	Independent	1841	3rd term
Huntingdon	Tancrède Sauvageau	Patriote	1848	1st term
Kamouraska	Pierre Canac	Patriote	1834, 1848	2nd term*
Kamouraska	Luc Letellier de St-Just (1851)	Liberal	1851	1st term
Leinster	Norbert Dumas	Patriote	1848	1st term
L'Islet	Charles-François Fournier	Patriote	1847	2nd term
Lotbinière	Joseph Laurin	Patriote	1844	2nd term
Mégantic	Dominick Daly	Conservative	1841	3rd term
Mégantic	Dunbar Ross (1850)	Reformer	1850	1st term
Missisquoi	William Badgley	Conservative	1847	2nd term
Montmorency	Joseph-Édouard Cauchon	Patriote	1844	2nd term
Montreal	Benjamin Holmes	Reformer	1841, 1848	2nd term*
Montreal	Louis-Hippolyte Lafontaine	Reformer	1830, (Note: Terrebonne) 1842	5th term*
Montreal County	André Jobin	Reformer	1835, 1843	4th term*
Nicolet	Thomas Fortier	Patriote	1848	1st term
Ottawa	John Egan	Reformer	1848	1st term
Portneuf	Édouard-Louis-Antoine-Charles Juchereau Duchesnay	Reformer	1848	1st term
Quebec County	Pierre-Joseph-Olivier Chauveau	Reformer	1844	2nd term
Quebec City	Thomas Cushing Aylwin	Patriote	1844	2nd term
Quebec City	François-Xavier Méthot (1848)	Patriote	1848	1st term
Quebec City	Jean Chabot	Conservative	1843	3rd term
Richelieu	Wolfred Nelson	Patriote	1844	2nd term
Rimouski	Joseph-Charles Taché	Patriote	1848	1st term
Rouville	Pierre Davignon	Patriote	1848	1st term
Saguenay	Marc-Pascal de Sales Laterrière	Patriote	1845	2nd term
St. Hyacinthe	Thomas Boutillier	Reformer	1841	3rd term
Saint-Maurice	Louis-Joseph Papineau	Patriote	1808, (Note: Kent/Montreal West) 1848	12th term*
Shefford	Lewis Thomas Drummond	Conservative	1844	2nd term
Sherbrooke	Bartholomew Conrad Augustus Gugy	Conservative	1848	1st term
Sherbrooke County	Samuel Brooks	Conservative	1844	2nd term
Sherbrooke County	Alexander Tilloch Galt (1849)	Independent	1849	1st term
Sherbrooke County	John Sewell Sanborn (1850)	Liberal	1850	1st term
Stanstead	John McConnell	Conservative	1844	2nd term
Terrebonne	Louis-Michel Viger	Patriote	1830, (Note: Chambly) 1842, (Note: Nicolet) 1848	4th term*
Trois-Rivières	Antoine Polette (1848)	Reformer	1848	1st term
Vaudreuil	Jean-Baptiste Mongenais	Patriote	1848	1st term
Verchères	James Leslie	Patriote	1841	3rd term
Verchères	George-Étienne Cartier (1848)	Reformer	1848	1st term
Yamaska	Michel Fourquin	Reformer	1848	1st term

=== Canada West - 42 seats ===
Riding	Member	Party	First elected/previously elected	No. of terms
Brockville	George Sherwood	Tory	1841	3rd term
Bytown	John Scott	Conservative	1848	1st term
Carleton	Edward Malloch	Independent	1834, 1848	3rd term*
Cornwall	John Hillyard Cameron	Conservative	1846	2nd term
Dundas	John Pliny Crysler	Tory	1848	1st term
Durham	James Smith	Reformer	1848	1st term
Essex	John Prince	Independent	1836	4th term
Frontenac	Henry Smith, Jr	Conservative	1841	3rd term
Glengarry	John Sandfield Macdonald	Reformer	1841	3rd term
Grenville	Reed Burritt	Independent	1848	1st term
Haldimand	David Thompson	Reformer	1841	3rd term
Haldimand	William Lyon Mackenzie (1851)	Reformer	1828, (Note: York) 1851	4th term*
East Halton	John Wetenhall	Reformer	1848	1st term
East Halton	Caleb Hopkins (1850)	Clear Grit	1828, 1834, 1841, 1850	4th term*
Hamilton	Allan Napier MacNab	Conservative	1830	6th term
Hastings	Billa Flint	Reformer	1848	1st term
Huron	William Cayley	Conservative	1846	2nd term
Kent	Malcolm Cameron	Reformer	1841	3rd term
Kingston	John A. Macdonald	Conservative	1844	2nd term
Lanark	Robert Bell	Reformer	1848	1st term
Leeds	William Buell Richards	Reformer	1848	1st term
Lennox & Addington	Benjamin Seymour	Conservative	1844	2nd term
Lincoln	William Hamilton Merritt	Reformer	1844	2nd term
London	John Wilson	Conservative	1848	1st term
Middlesex	William Notman	Reformer	1848	1st term
Niagara (town)	Walter Hamilton Dickson	Independent	1844	2nd term
Norfolk	Henry John Boulton	Reformer	1842, (Note: Niagara (town)) 1848	2nd term*
Northumberland	Adam H Meyers	Independent	1844	2nd term
Oxford	Francis Hincks	Reformer	1841, 1848	2nd term*
Peterborough	James Hall	Independent	1848	1st term
Prescott	Thomas H Johnston	Independent	1848	1st term
Prince Edward	David Barker Stevenson	Conservative	1848	1st term
Russell	George Byron Lyon-Fellowes	Independent	1848	1st term
Simcoe	William Benjamin Robinson	Conservative	1844	2nd term
Stormont	Alexander McLean	Tory	1837, 1848	2nd term*
Toronto	William Henry Boulton	Conservative	1844	2nd term
Toronto	Henry Sherwood	Conservative	1836, (Note: Brockville) 1843	4th term*
Waterloo	James Webster	Conservative	1844	2nd term
Waterloo	Adam Johnston Fergusson (1849)	Reformer	1849	1st term
Welland	Duncan McFarland	Independent	1848	1st term
Wentworth	Harmannus Smith	Moderate Reformer	1834, 1841	4th term*
East York	William Hume Blake	Reformer	1848	1st term
East York	Peter Perry (1849)	Clear Grit	1824, (Note: Lennox & Addington) 1849	5th term*
North York	Robert Baldwin	Reformer	1829, (Note: York (town)) 1841	5th term*
South York	James Hervey Price	Reformer	1841	3rd term
West York	Joseph Curran Morrison	Reformer	1848	1st term
