= Executive Council of the Province of Canada =

The Executive Council of the Province of Canada was the cabinet of the colonial government of the United Province of Canada, the polity in existence between 1841 and 1867. The council was not initially accountable to the Legislative Assembly of the Province of Canada, the legislature of the colony, but answered only to the Governor-General of the Province of Canada. Responsible government was not firmly established until 1848 under Lord Elgin. The council was the successor body of the Executive Council of Upper Canada and the Executive Council of Lower Canada and was dissolved in 1867 and was replaced by the Canadian Cabinet, the Executive Council of Ontario and the Executive Council of Quebec upon Canadian Confederation.

Members of the Executive Council functioned as portfolio ministers and advisers to the colonial governor, and later to the Joint Premier of the Province of Canada. They were generally members of the elected Legislative Assembly, but there were also some members from the appointed Legislative Council of the Province of Canada. Due to the frequent move of the colony's capital during this period, the council sat in five different cities during its short lifespan: Kingston (1841–43), Montreal (1843–49), Toronto (1849–52 and 1856–58), Quebec City (1852–1856 and 1859–66) and Ottawa (1866–67).

== Partisanship ==
While political partisanship was certainly present during this era, it was neither formal nor clearly defined. There was no contemporary political maps or listing of members (of the assembly or the executive council) by "political party" per se. Partisan affiliations was not the sole, and sometimes not even the primary, determining factor of politicians' political allegiances, and how much their affiliation influenced their allegiances varied over time. Accordingly, the political affiliation classifications below serve only as general references to the broad political groupings the joint-premiers most likely belonged to, and the broad groupings the supporters of their governments most likely considered themselves as parts of. Varying classification systems/approaches and partisanship labels have been used by differing authors depending on the focus of their analysis. There were sub-groupings with membership that straddled multiple groupings with fluctuating degrees of cohesion and formality from session to session. There were moderate and radical or "ultra" members within each grouping. The ministry often could not count on the support of all members of the joint-premiers' political groupings and some counted on support from different rival fractions on different issues/voting divisions. The political deadlock and instability was the primary driver that led to the Great Coalition ministry, which eventually produced the Canadian Confederation.

== Ministries and Premiers of the Province of Canada ==
- Conservative
- Reform
- Liberal-Conservative
- Liberal/Grits
- Coalition
- Governor driven / loyalist

Ministry (Political party)	Tenure	Joint-premiers		№	Governor General
Ministry (Political party)	Tenure	Canada West	Canada East	№	Governor General
Governor Sydenham (Multi-partisan)	February 13, 1841 – January 12, 1842	Samuel Harrison co-leading Executive Councillor	(Note: Practice of government being headed jointly by a minister from Canada West and a minister from Canada East had not yet be formally established.)	1st	Baron Sydenham (1841)
Governor Sydenham (Multi-partisan)	February 13, 1841 – January 12, 1842	William Henry Draper co-leading Executive Councillor	(Note: Practice of government being headed jointly by a minister from Canada West and a minister from Canada East had not yet be formally established.)	1st	Baron Sydenham (1841)
Governor Bagot (Multi-partisan)	January 12, 1842 – Sep 15, 1842	William Henry Draper co-leading Executive Councillor	Charles Richard Ogden co-leading Executive Councillor	1st	Sir Charles Bagot (1842–43)
Lafontaine-Baldwin I (Reform)	Sep 16, 1842 – Nov 27, 1843	Robert Baldwin; Co-premier	Louis-Hippolyte; Lafontaine; Premier	1st	Sir Charles Bagot (1842–43)
Draper (Pro-Governor; Tory/Conservative)	Nov 27, 1843 – December 12, 1843	vacant	Dominick Daly (Note: The honours associated with entitlement of being addressed as "sir" were conferred upon Daly/Taché/Macdonald /Cartier after this period in office. Daley was knighted in 1856; Taché in 1858; Macdonald on Dominion Day in 1867; Cartier was created a Baronet in 1868) de facto government leader (Note: Daly was he only member remaining in the Executive Council following resignation of all Reform members)	1st	Sir Charles Metcalfe (1843–45)
Draper (Pro-Governor; Tory/Conservative)	December 12, 1843 – June 17, 1846	William Henry Draper; Premier	Denis-Benjamin Viger; Co-premier	2nd	Sir Charles Metcalfe (1843–45)
Draper (Pro-Governor; Tory/Conservative)	June 18, 1846 – May 28, 1847	William Henry Draper; Premier	Denis-Benjamin; Papineau; Co-premier	2nd	Earl Cathcart (1846–47)
Draper (Pro-Governor; Tory/Conservative)	June 18, 1846 – May 28, 1847	William Henry Draper; Premier	Denis-Benjamin; Papineau; Co-premier	2nd	Earl of Elgin (1847–54)
Sherwood (Pro-Governor; Tory/Conservative)	May 29, 1847 – December 7, 1847	Henry Sherwood; Premier	Denis-Benjamin; Papineau; Co-premier	2nd	Earl of Elgin (1847–54)
Sherwood (Pro-Governor; Tory/Conservative)	December 8, 1847 – March 10, 1848	Henry Sherwood; Premier	vacant	3rd	Earl of Elgin (1847–54)
Responsible government instituted				3rd	Earl of Elgin (1847–54)
Lafontaine-Baldwin II (Reform)	March 10, 1848 – October 27, 1851	Robert Baldwin; Co-premier	Louis-Hippolyte; Lafontaine, Premier	3rd	Earl of Elgin (1847–54)
Hincks-Morin (Reform)	October 28, 1851 – Sep 10, 1854	Francis Hincks; Premier	Augustin-Norbert Morin; Co-premier	4th	Earl of Elgin (1847–54)
MacNab-Morin/Taché (Coalition: Conservative, Bleu & moderate Reformers)	Sep 11, 1854 – January 26, 1855	Sir Allan N. MacNab; Premier	Augustin-Norbert Morin; Co-premier	5th	Sir Edmund Walker Head (1854–61)
MacNab-Morin/Taché (Coalition: Conservative, Bleu & moderate Reformers)	January 27, 1855 – May 23, 1856	Sir Allan N. MacNab; Premier	Étienne-Paschal Taché; Co-premier (until May 24, 1856); Premier	5th	Sir Edmund Walker Head (1854–61)
Taché-Macdonald (Liberal-Conservative)	May 24, 1856 – Nov 25, 1857	John A. Macdonald; Co-premier (until Nov. 26, 1857); Premier	Étienne-Paschal Taché; Co-premier (until May 24, 1856); Premier	5th	Sir Edmund Walker Head (1854–61)
Macdonald–Cartier I (Liberal-Conservative)	Nov 26, 1857 – July 29, 1858	John A. Macdonald; Co-premier (until Nov. 26, 1857); Premier	George-Étienne Cartier; Co-premier	6th	Sir Edmund Walker Head (1854–61)
Interregnum	July 30, 1858 – August 1, 1858	vacant	vacant	6th	Sir Edmund Walker Head (1854–61)
Brown–Dorion (Reform) (Clear Grits/Rouges)	August 2, 1858 – August 4, 1858	George Brown; Premier	Antoine-Aimé Dorion; Co-premier	6th	Sir Edmund Walker Head (1854–61)
Interregnum	August 5, 1858	vacant	vacant	6th	Sir Edmund Walker Head (1854–61)
Macdonald–Cartier II (Liberal-Conservative)	August 6, 1858 (Note: See Double Shuffle) – May 23, 1862	John A. Macdonald; Co-premier	George-Étienne Cartier; Premier	6th	Sir Edmund Walker Head (1854–61)
Macdonald–Cartier II (Liberal-Conservative)	August 6, 1858 – May 23, 1862	John A. Macdonald; Co-premier	George-Étienne Cartier; Premier	7th	The Viscount Monck (1854–61)
Sandfield Macdonald–Sicotte (Moderate Reform)	May 24, 1862 – May 15, 1863	John Sandfield Macdonald; Premier	Louis-Victor Sicotte; Co-premier	7th	The Viscount Monck (1854–61)
Sandfield Macdonald–Dorion (Reform/Liberal)	May 16, 1863 – March 29, 1864	John Sandfield Macdonald; Premier	Antoine-Aimé Dorion; Co-premier	7th	The Viscount Monck (1854–61)
Sandfield Macdonald–Dorion (Reform/Liberal)	May 16, 1863 – March 29, 1864	John Sandfield Macdonald; Premier	Antoine-Aimé Dorion; Co-premier	8th	The Viscount Monck (1854–61)
Great Coalition (coalition: Conservatives; Blues; most Liberals) (Note: 7 Liberals (Sandfield Macdonald faction) from Canada West and 21 Rouges were in opposition 31 Liberals from Canada West and 4 Liberals from Canada East support the coalition until 1866; in 1866 Brown and 8 others rejoined the Liberals in opposition.)	March 30, 1864 – July 30, 1865	John A. Macdonald; Co-premier	Sir Étienne-Paschal Taché† (Note: Died in office); Premier	8th	The Viscount Monck (1854–61)
Great Coalition (coalition: Conservatives; Blues; most Liberals)	July 31, 1865 – August 6, 1865	John A. Macdonald; Co-premier	vacant	8th	The Viscount Monck (1854–61)
Great Coalition (coalition: Conservatives; Blues; most Liberals)	August 7, 1865 – June 30, 1867	John A. Macdonald; Co-premier	Sir Narcisse-Fortunat Belleau; Premier (Note: Belleau's partisan affiliation at this time is subject to debate. His selection was not opposed by Brown and Dorion who were in council at the time, likely a compromise choice.)	8th	The Viscount Monck (1854–61)

== Offices held by executive councillors ==
The following offices were held by members of the executive council, thought not always:

- President of the Executive Council
- Attorney General, Lower Canada
- Attorney General, Upper Canada
- Provincial Secretary and Registrar (existed prior to 1842 as two separate offices, one each for Upper and Lower Canadas)
- Inspector General (after 1859 renamed Ministers of Finance) (sub-cabinet 1841–42)
- Receiver General
- Ministers of Agriculture (from 1852) (Note: Office established by statue in 1852, but not held as a standalone office until 1862)
- Commissioner of Public Works (in commission by members of the Board of Works 1841–46)
- Commissioner of Crown Lands (sub-cabinet 1841–42)
- Solicitor General, Lower Canada (sub-cabinet 1845–47, 1848–58)
- Solicitor General, Upper Canada (sub-cabinet 1848–60)
- Postmaster General (sub-cabinet 1841–51)
- Superintendent General of Indian Affairs (Note: Not a cabinet post prior to 1860 but a role commissioned to one of the secretaries of the Governor. From 1860 to 1867 ex officio of the Commissioner of Crown Lands)

=== Presidents of the Executive Council ===
The title president of the council were usually not held by the actual leader of the government during this period. Allen MacNab was the only person who held the title while premier. George Brown held the title in Great Coalition years after his two day-tenure as Premier. Most, but not all, joint premiers held the office of Attorney General for the portion of the colony they hailed from.

- William Morris 1846–1848
- James Leslie 1848
- Philip Michael Matthew Scott VanKoughnet 1856
- Isidore Thibaudeau, May 16, 1863 – March 29, 1864
- George Brown June 30, 1864 – December 1865
- Adam Johnston Fergusson Blair 1866

== Ministries ==
=== Sydenham-Bagot Ministry (February 1841 – September 1842) ===
In the months immediately following the reunion of the two Canadas, the ministry was led by the Governor General, the recently raised Baron Sydenham, himself. In his despatch to his direct superior, Colonial Secretary the Lord Russell on February 16, he reported having made only three appointments formally, appointing Dominick Daly, Samuel Harrison, and John Henry Dunn, to continue in their roles as provincial secretary for Lower Canada, for Upper Canada, and as Receiver General, and submitted additional names seeking approval from the Crown: Robert Baldwin Sullivan, William Henry Draper, and Robert Baldwin from Canada West and Charles Richard Ogden, Charles Dewey Day from Canada East, all to executive portfolios they held prior to the union. The line up was not well received in Lower Canada. The press noted that there was only one Catholic (Mr. Daly) in the administration, and not a single French Canadian.

There was no premier identified in either Sydenham's despatch or in contemporary press reports. The mentions of Draper-Ogden cabinet or Harrison-Draper administration appeared half a century later in Senate debates (Note: for examples, seeJoseph-Hyacinthe Bellerose, Senator (April 7, 1897). "Debate on the Address". Parliamentary Debates (Hansard). Canada: Senate. p. 150-171.) but mentions of the cabinet or individual executive councillors in news report of the day invariably portrayed them as advisors subservient to the Governor. In the debate to move the writ of election for the newly appointed Attorney General LaFontaine that took place in late 1842 Sir Allen MacNab, then in opposition, drew attention to the uncertain of status, and was met with uniform responses from executive councillors that it was not the right time to discuss the subject.

Sydenham took an active role in lining up candidates that would be supportive of his administration in the lead up to the 1841 legislative election. The primary political dividing line during this brief period was the issue of the union. Political alignment could be generalized into the following four main groupings:

- Upper Canada Tories, the all power elite who had wielded power former known as the Family Compact, saw the union as a threat of their power
- Upper Canada Reformers, who had been systematically prevented from power despite their large numbers, favoured the union as a means to divert power away from the Tories
- Lower Canada English Tories, a tiny minority of the population with an increasingly tenuous grip on power, supported the union to gain greater number of English speaking votes
- French Canadians, made up of nearly half the united province's population at the time but was excluded from political participation for two years due to the suspension of the constitution in Lower Canada, most strongly opposed to the union due to their exclusion in the process

Accordingly, the governor found himself relying on the support of reformers on one side and the Tories on the other. Elections were to take place in April and Sydenham had grand plans in mind. His low regard and misgiving for the Tory local leaders, those in Lower Canada in particular, motivated his aggressive drive to preserve the township form of municipal government in Upper Canada and to extend it to Lower Canada, believing that the provincial assemblies neither had the capacity nor the credibility to manage matters centrally. Having made the command of a majority in the assembly a requirement of the future governments of the province, he set out on a tour of more than 40 towns for the purpose of handpicking candidates for the forthcoming elections to the united parliament in the months leading up to the reunion.

Sydenham's engagement and interest in ministry building was not all that surprising. He was not yet forty when he was appointed to the post, and was considered a rising star with jilted ambition in Westminster just a year earlier, having previously entered cabinet at age 34 as the President of the Board of Trade (essentially trade minister) in the short-lived Whig Melbourne ministry. A ruthless veteran of consequential electoral politics back home, Sydenham did not refrain from high-handed tactics like gerrymandering and bribery with patronage. He also largely turned a blind eye to riots, election related violence instigated by the Orange Order and blatant electoral fraud. His simultaneous aggressive intervention and non intervention resulted in electoral divisions such as Chambly, Rouville, Vaudreuil, Terrebonne, Beauharnois, all with overwhelming majority of French Canadians oppose to the union, returning the governors preferred candidates. For this Sydenham was severely criticized not just by local press but by newspapers back in London. He was unapologetic however, having been quoted with this retort "If he means that I personally interfere he is quite misinformed, but the Govt. officials must try to get seats in Parliament… and they surely have a right to look after their elections."

Sydenham's supporters won thirteen of the forty-two seats in Canada East and an overwhelming twenty-six of the forty-two in Canada West, a total of thirty-nine firm supporters of the union against thirty-three opposed, and the ten remaining with uncertain allegiances. The group of supporters Sydenham assembled was shaky at best, however. While he controlled a good portion with government offices, his ministry was dependent on many independent minded reformers. Many new politician hand picked by him, including Hamilton Hartley Killaly who he quickly installed into the ministry, lacked political experience and wielded little influence in the legislature. After his ministry failed to get a bill passed to establish a single bank, according to his civil secretary Thomas Murdoch, Sydenham took control of not only policy making but also legislative strategy.

The ministry's most serious adversaries ultimately came from within. Robert Baldwin and Francis Hincks, two leading Reformers supportive of the ministry members of the ministry, parted ways with Sydenham over the clergy reserves bill, and sought to construct a united Reform Party in alliance with French speaking Reformers. They moved for an expression of non-confidence in four executive councillors, and demanded that the council be reconstituted on a party basis. While Sydenham's ministry survived the initial attack, the ministers conceded to the assembly that they would resign if they lost the confidence of the house. Sydenham, too, also acknowledged he could not perpetually set aside the democratic principles he practiced back home. He did not live to see the ministry he built collapse. An infection from a riding accident claimed his life on September 19, 1841, at age 42, a day after the first session of the legislative assembly prorogued.

Sydenham was succeeded by Sir Charles Bagot, who arrived in Kingston in January the following year and inherited Sydenham's ministry. Bagot spoke fluent French and swiftly took a number of actions that demonstrated his willingness to work with the French speaking community in Canada East, such as appointing French-speakers to government positions and suspending selected decrees of the notorious Special Council. Bagot also took meaningful steps toward responsible government, despite maintaining an official position against any demand toward it.

==== Executive councillors of the Sydenham-Bagot Ministries ====
- Conservative
- Reform
- Governor loyalist

Officeholder was not a member of the Executive Council at the time.

Office	Start	End	Holder		Constituency	Note
President of the Council	1841-02-10	1943-11-27	Robert Baldwin Sullivan	West	Leg. Co. (appointed)	later Reform
Attorneys General, LC	1841-02-10	1842-09-15	Charles Richard Ogden	East	Three Rivers	
Attorneys General, UC	1841-02-10	1842-09-15	William Henry Draper	West	Russell	
Provincial Secretary, LC (Note: from 1844 onward in later ministries, Provincial Secretary for the entire province)	1841-02-10	1848-03-10	Dominick Daly	East	Megantick	
Provincial Secretary, UC	1841-02-10	1843-09-30	Samuel Bealey Harrison	West	Kingston	
Solicitor General, LC	1841-02-10	1842-06-20	Charles Dewey Day	East	Ottawa County	
Solicitor General, UC	1841-02-10	1841-06-13	Robert Baldwin	West	Hastings	resigned
Solicitor General, UC	1842-07-23	1842-09-15	Henry Sherwood	West	Toronto	
Inspector General	1841-02-10	1841-12-31	James Cary (for LC)		n/a	sub-cabinet
Inspector General	1841-02-10	1842-06-08	J. Macaulay (for UC)		n/a	sub-cabinet
Inspector General	1842-06-09	1843-12-11	Francis Hincks	West	Oxford	
Receiver General	1841-02-10	1843-12-31	John Henry Dunn	West	Toronto	
Commissioner of Crown Lands	1841-02-10	1841-06-30	Robert Baldwin Sullivan	West	Leg. Co. (appointed)	
Commissioner of Crown Lands	1841-07-23	1842-10-12	John Davidson		n/a	sub-cabinet
Chair, Board of Works	1841-12-21	1846-06-08	Hamilton Hartley Killaly	West	London	
Postmasters General	1841-02-10	1851-02-21	Thomas Allen Stayner		n/a	sub-cabinet

=== First Lafontaine-Baldwin ministry (September 1842 – November 1843) ===
Strictly speaking, the first Reform ministry led by Robert Baldwin and Louis-Hippolyte Lafontaine was just part of Governor Bagot's ministry. On accepting the appointment as Governor General, Bagot was instructed to uphold existing policy of accommodation of the will of the local legislature without submitting to demands for responsible government. Bagot nonetheless took the advice of William Henry Draper and Samuel Harrison, his two leading moderate executive councillors, and negotiated with LaFontaine toward ending the exclusion of French speakers in government. In recognition of the sizable block of Reformers in the legislature, Bagot invited Louis-Hippolyte Lafontaine to nominate certain number of executive councillors in exchange for their support. Recognizing the likely danger of the continual exclusion of half of the colony's population, Draper offered his resignation along with those of other councillors to give the governor any required room for negotiation.

The result was the entry of Lafontaine and Robert Baldwin along with three of their nominees, Augustin-Norbert Morin and Thomas Cushing Aylwin from Canada East and James Edward Small from Canada West, into council. The incumbent councillors who were Reformers or primarily loyalist to the administration remained while Draper and two other Conservatives took their leave. Bagot also appointed Baldwin and Lafontaine as Attorney General of Upper and Lower Canada respectively, firmly establishing them as co-premiers of his government. The continual presence of Sydenham's appointees who were not Reformers allowed Bagot to maintain the appearance of having starved off responsible government. But as Bagot admitted in his despatch to Colonial Secretary Edward Stanley, "whether the doctrine of responsible government is openly acknowledged, or is only tacitly acquiesced in, virtually it exists."

==== Executive councillors in the first Lafontaine-Baldwin ministry ====
- Reform
- Governor loyalist

Officeholder was not a member of the Executive Council at the time.

Office	Start	End	Holder		Constituency	Note
President of the Council	1841-02-10	1943-11-27	Robert Baldwin Sullivan	West	Leg. Co. (appointed)	later a Reformer
Attorneys General, LC	1842-09-17	1843-12-11	Robert Baldwin	West	Rimouski*	
Attorneys General, UC	1842-09-16	1843-12-11	Louis-Hippolyte Lafontaine	East	4th York*	
Provincial Secretary, LC	1841-02-10	1848-03-10	Dominick Daly	East	Megantick	
Provincial Secretary, UC	1841-02-10	1843-09-30	Samuel Bealey Harrison	West	Kingston	
Inspector General	1842-06-09	1843-12-11	Francis Hincks	West	Oxford	
Receiver General	1841-02-10	1843-12-31	John Henry Dunn	West	Toronto	
Solicitor General, LC	1842-09-24	1843-12-11	Thomas Cushing Aylwin	East	Portneuf	
Solicitor General, UC	1842-09-26	1843-12-11	James Edward Small	West	3rd York	
Commissioner of Crown Lands	1842-10-13	1843-12-11	Augustin-Norbert Morin	East	Saguenay	
Chair, Board of Works	1841-12-21	1846-06-08	Hamilton Hartley Killaly	West	London	
Postmasters General.	1841-02-10	1851-02-21	Thomas Allen Stayner		n/a	sub-cabinet

As Bagot became ill in 1843, he handed off more of his authorities to his co-premiers. He died in May 1843, and the brief experiment of responsible came quickly to a halt under his successor.

=== Draper-Sherwood ministry (December 1843 – March 1848) ===
==== Executive councillors of the Draper-Sherwood Ministry ====
- Conservative
- Governor loyalist

Officeholder was not a member of the Executive Council at the time.

Office	Start	End	Holder		Constituency	Note
Attorneys General, UC	1843-12-12	1847-05-28	William Henry Draper	West	Leg. Co. (appointed)	
Attorneys General, UC	1847-05-29	1848-03-10	Henry Sherwood	West	Toronto	
Attorneys General, LC	1844-09-02	1847-04-22	James Smith	East	Missiskoui	
Attorneys General, LC	1847-04-23	1848-03-10	William Badgley	East	Missiskoui	
President of the Council	1843-12-12	1846-06-17	Denis-Benjamin Viger	East	Richelieu	
President of the Council	1847-05-22	1848-03-10	William Morris	West	Leg. Co. (appointed)	
Provincial Secretary	1841-02-13	1848-03-10	Dominick Daly	East	Megantick	
Inspector General	1844-12-20	1845-04-30	William Benjamin Robinson	West	Simcoe	
Inspector General	1845-08-06	1848-03-10	William Cayley	West	Huron	
Receiver General	1844-09-02	1847-05-20	William Morris	West	Leg. Co. (appointed)	
Receiver General	1847-05-11	1847-12-07	John A. Macdonald	West	Kingston	
Receiver General	1847-12-08	1848-03-10	François-Pierre Bruneau	East	Leg. Co. (appointed)	
Commissioner of Crown Lands	1844-09-02	1847-12-07	Denis-Benjamin Papineau	East	Ottawa County	
Commissioner of Crown Lands	1847-12-08	1848-03-10	John A. Macdonald	West	Kingston	
Solicitor General, UC	1846-07-01	1848-03-10	John Hillyard Cameron	West	Cornwall	sub-cabinet prior to 1847-05-22
Speaker of the Legislative Council	1847-05-31	1848-03-10	Peter McGill	East	Leg. Co. (appointed)	
Chair, Board of Works	1841-12-21	1846-06-08	Hamilton Hartley Killaly	West	London	sub-cabinet
Commissioner of Public Works	1846-06-22	1848-03-10	William Benjamin Robinson	West	Simcoe	sub-cabinet
Solicitor General, UC	1844-10-07	1846-06-30	Henry Sherwood	West	Toronto	sub-cabinet
Solicitor General, LC	1845-08-21	1847-05-21	J. A. Taschereau		n/a	sub-cabinet
Solicitor General, LC	1847-12-08	1848-03-10	J.E. Tarcotte		n/a	sub-cabinet
Postmasters General	1841-02-10	1851-02-21	Thomas Allen Stayner		n/a	sub-cabinet
