= L'Islet (Province of Canada electoral district) =

Electoral district in former Province of Canada

Coordinates: 47°5′0″N 70°19′30″W

Province of Canada electoral district

Defunct pre-Confederation electoral district
- Legislature: Legislative Assembly of the Province of Canada
- District created: 1841
- District abolished: 1867
- First contested: 1841
- Last contested: 1863

L'Islet was an electoral district of the Legislative Assembly of the Parliament of the Province of Canada, in Canada East, on the south shore of the Saint Lawrence River, north-east of Quebec City. It was created in 1841 and was based on the previous electoral district of the same name for the Legislative Assembly of Lower Canada. It was represented by one member in the Legislative Assembly.

The electoral district was abolished in 1867, upon the creation of Canada and the province of Quebec.

== Boundaries ==
The Union Act, 1840 merged the two provinces of Upper Canada and Lower Canada into the Province of Canada, with a single Parliament. The separate parliaments of Lower Canada and Upper Canada were abolished.

The Union Act provided that the pre-existing electoral boundaries of Lower Canada and Upper Canada would continue to be used in the new Parliament, unless altered by the Union Act itself. The L'Islet electoral district of Lower Canada was not altered by the Act, and therefore continued with the same boundaries which had been set by a statute of Lower Canada in 1829:

The County of l'Islet shall be bounded on the north east by the said County of Kamouraska, on the south west by a line parallel thereto running front the westerly angle of a Tract of land commonly called the Seigniory of the River du Sud, prolonged to the southern boundary of the Province, on the north west by the River Saint Lawrence, together with all the islands in the said River Saint Lawrence nearest to the said County, and in the whole or in part fronting the same, and on the south east by the southern boundary of the Province; which County so bounded, comprises the Seigniories of Saint Roch des Aulnets, Reaume, Saint Jean Port Joli, Islet, Lessard, Bonsecours, Vincelot, and its augmentation, Cap Saint Ignace, Gagnier, Sainte Claire, Rivière du Sud and Lepinay.

L'Islet electoral district was located on the south shore of the Saint Lawrence, to the north-east of Quebec City (now in L'Islet Regional County Municipality). The elections were held in the town of L'Islet.

== Members of the Legislative Assembly (1841–1867) ==
L'Islet was a single-member constituency.

The following were the members of the Legislative Assembly from L'Islet. Party affiliations are based on the biographies of individual members given by the National Assembly of Quebec, as well as votes in the Legislative Assembly. "Party" was a fluid concept, especially during the early years of the Province of Canada.

| Parliament | Member | Years in Office | Party |
|---|---|---|---|
| 1st Parliament; 1841–1844 | Étienne-Paschal Taché | 1841–1846 | Anti-unionist; French-Canadian Group |
| 2nd Parliament; 1844–1847 | Étienne-Paschal Taché (Note: Resigned seat on appointment as Deputy Adjutant General of Militia, July 1, 1846: Côté, Political Appointments and Elections, p. 60, note (71).) | 1841–1846 | French-Canadian Group |
| 2nd Parliament; 1844–1847 | Charles-François Fournier (Note: Elected in by-election, May 6, 1847: Côté, Political Appointments and Elections, p. 60, note (72).) | 1847 | French-Canadian Group |
| 3rd Parliament; 1848–1851 | Charles-François Fournier | 1847–1863 | French-Canadian Group, then Ministerialist |
| 4th Parliament; 1851–1854 | Charles-François Fournier | 1847–1863 | Ministerialist |
| 5th Parliament; 1854–1857 | Charles-François Fournier | 1847–1863 | Ministerialist, then Bleu |
| 6th Parliament; 1858–1861 | Charles-François Fournier | 1847–1863 | Bleu |
| 7th Parliament; 1861–1863 | Charles-François Fournier | 1847–1863 | Bleu |
| 8th Parliament; 1863–1867 | Louis-Bonaventure Caron | 1863–1867 | Anti-Confederation; Rouge |

== Abolition ==
The district was abolished on July 1, 1867, when the British North America Act, 1867 came into force, splitting the Province of Canada into Quebec and Ontario. It was succeeded by electoral districts of the same name in the House of Commons of Canada and the Legislative Assembly of Quebec.

== See also ==
- List of elections in the Province of Canada
