= Chambly (Province of Canada electoral district) =

Electoral district in former Province of Canada

Province of Canada electoral district

Defunct pre-Confederation electoral district
- Legislature: Legislative Assembly of the Province of Canada
- District created: 1841
- District abolished: 1867
- First contested: 1841
- Last contested: 1863

Chambly was an electoral district of the Legislative Assembly of the Parliament of the Province of Canada, in Canada East. It was created in 1841, based on the previous electoral district of the same name for the Legislative Assembly of Lower Canada, for an area south of Montreal. It was represented by one member in the Legislative Assembly.

The electoral district was abolished in 1867, upon the creation of Canada and the province of Quebec.

== Boundaries ==
The Union Act, 1840 merged the two provinces of Upper Canada and Lower Canada into the Province of Canada, with a single Parliament. The separate parliaments of Lower Canada and Upper Canada were abolished.

The Union Act provided that the pre-existing electoral boundaries of Lower Canada and Upper Canada would continue to be used in the new Parliament, unless altered by the Union Act itself. The Chambly electoral district of Lower Canada was not altered by the Act, and therefore continued with the same boundaries which had been set by a statute of Lower Canada in 1829:

The County of Chambly shall be bounded on the north west by the River Saint Lawrence, on the south east by the River Richelieu or Chambly, together with all the Islands in the River Saint Lawrence, and in the River Richelieu or Chambly, nearest to the said County, and in whole or in part fronting the same, on the south west by the north east boundaries of the Seigniories of Laprairie and De Lery, and on the north east by the County of Verchères comprehending the Seigniories of Boucherville, Montarville, Longueuil, Fief Trembly, Chambly West, and the Barony of Longueuil, within the said limits.

The electoral district was located south of Montreal, in the Montérégie region. The elections were held at Longueuil.

== Members of the Legislative Assembly (1841–1867) ==
Chambly was a single-member constituency.

The following were the members of the Legislative Assembly for Chambly. The party affiliations are based on the biographies of individual members given by the National Assembly of Quebec, as well as votes in the Legislative Assembly. "Party" was a fluid concept, especially during the early years of the Province of Canada.

| Parliament | Members | Years in Office | Party |
|---|---|---|---|
| 1st Parliament; 1841–1844 | John Yule (Note: Resigned his seat September 22, 1843: Côté, Appointments and Elections, p. 59, note (5).) | 1841–1843 | Unionist and Government supporter |
| 1st Parliament; 1841–1844 | Louis Lacoste (Note: Elected in by-election, October 23, 1843: Côté, Appointments and Elections, p. 59, note (6).) | 1843–1844 (By-election) | French-Canadian Group |
| 2nd Parliament; 1844–1847 | Louis Lacoste | 1844–1847 | French-Canadian Group |
| 3rd Parliament; 1848–1851 | Pierre Beaubien (Note: Seat vacated on appointment as Gaol Physician, July 31, 1849: Côté, Appointments and Elections, p. 60, note (90).) | 1848–1849 | French-Canadian Group |
| 3rd Parliament; 1848–1851 | Louis Lacoste (Note: Elected in by-election, September 25, 1849: Côté, Appointments and Elections, p. 59, note (6).) | 1849–1851 (by-election) | Ministerialist |
| 4th Parliament; 1851–1853 | Louis Lacoste | 1851–1853 | Ministerialist |
| 5th Parliament; 1854–1857 | Noël Darche | 1854–1857 | Rouge |
| 6th Parliament; 1858–1861 | Louis Lacoste | 1858–1861 | Bleu |
| 7th Parliament; 1861–1863 | Charles Boucher de Boucherville | 1861–1867 | Independent |
| 8th Parliament; 1863–1867 | Charles Boucher de Boucherville | 1861–1867 | Confederation; Bleu |

== Abolition ==
The district was abolished on July 1, 1867, when the British North America Act, 1867 came into force, splitting the Province of Canada into Quebec and Ontario. It was succeeded by electoral districts of the same name in the House of Commons of Canada and the Legislative Assembly of Quebec.
