= Sherbrooke (Province of Canada electoral district) =

Electoral district in former Province of Canada

Sherbrooke Canada East
Province of Canada electoral district

Defunct pre-Confederation electoral district
- Legislature: Legislative Assembly of the Province of Canada
- District created: 1841
- District abolished: 1867
- First contested: 1841
- Last contested: 1863

Sherbrooke was an electoral district of the Legislative Assembly of the Parliament of the Province of Canada, in Canada East. It was centred primarily on the town of Sherbrooke in the Eastern Townships.

The district was created in 1841, based on the previous electoral district of the same name for the Legislative Assembly of Lower Canada, but with some significant alterations, to include the neighbouring town of Lennoxville. The new boundaries were drawn by the Governor General of the Province of Canada, Lord Sydenham, to favour the anglophone voters, who would be likely to support the Governor General's government and the new Province of Canada, formed from the former provinces of Lower Canada and Upper Canada. The boundaries of the electoral district were an example of an ethnic and linguistic gerrymander.

Sherbrooke electoral district was represented by one member in the Legislative Assembly. It was abolished in 1867, upon the creation of Canada and the province of Quebec.

== Boundaries ==
Sherbrooke electoral district included the town of Sherbrooke, the village of Lennoxville, and the rural area connecting the two municipalities (with population growth, now merged into a single municipality of Sherbrooke).

The Union Act, 1840 merged the two provinces of Upper Canada and Lower Canada into the Province of Canada, with a single Parliament. The separate parliaments of Lower Canada and Upper Canada were abolished. The Union Act provided that the pre-existing electoral boundaries of Lower Canada and Upper Canada would continue to be used in the new Parliament, unless altered by the Union Act itself.

Sherbrooke was one of the electoral districts altered by the Union Act. The Act provided that the town of Sherbrooke would be one electoral district, but gave the Governor General the power to draw the boundaries for the district.

The Governor General, Lord Sydenham, issued a proclamation on March 4, 1841, setting the boundaries for several electoral districts in Canada East, including Sherbrooke. The boundaries for Sherbrooke were as follows:

The Town of Sherbrooke, for the purposes aforesaid, shall be bounded and limited as follows; to wit: – shall comprehend all that part of the Township of Ascot, in the District of St. Francis, which is contained in the fifth and sixth ranges of the said Township, from lot number ten to lot number seventeen, inclusively, and in the seventh and eight ranges thereof, from lot number fourteen to lot number twenty-two, inclusively; also all that part of the Township of Orford, in the said District, which is contained in the first and second ranges thereof, inclusively; the above parts and sections conjointly including and circumscribing the said Town of Sherbrooke and the adjacent village of Lennoxville, with their respective vicinities.

Sydenham's overall goal in drawing the boundaries was to ensure that supporters of the creation of the new Province of Canada would be elected. At that time, Sherbrooke and the village of Lennoxville were separate municipalities, three miles apart. Both had substantial anglophone populations of British background, who were more likely to vote for the new union and for Sydenham's government, than were the francophone Canadiens, who generally opposed the union. By linking Lennoxville to Sherbrooke, along with the corridor of largely rural land which connected them, Sydenham increased the likelihood that a member would be elected who supported the union and his government. The boundaries drawn by Sydenham were an example of an ethnic and linguistic gerrymander.

== Members of the Legislative Assembly (1841–1867) ==
Sherbrooke was a single-member constituency.

The following were the members of the Legislative Assembly for Sherbrooke. The party affiliations are based on the biographies of individual members given by the National Assembly of Quebec, as well as votes in the Legislative Assembly. "Party" was a fluid concept, especially during the early years of the Province of Canada.

Parliament	Member	Years in Office	Party
1st Parliament; 1841–1844	Edward Hale	1841–1847	Unionist; Tory
2nd Parliament; 1844–1847	Edward Hale	1841–1847	"British" Tory
3rd Parliament; 1848–1851	Bartholomew Gugy	1848–1851	Independent Tory
4th Parliament; 1851–1854	Edward Short (Note: Vacated seat on appointment to the Superior Court of Lower Canada, November 12, 1852: Côté, Political Appointments and Elections in the Province of Canada, 1841 to 1860, p. 62, note (145).)	1851–1852	"English" Moderate
4th Parliament; 1851–1854	Alexander Tilloch Galt (Note: Elected in by-election, March 8, 1853: Côté, Political Appointments and Elections in the Province of Canada, 1841 to 1860, p. 62, note (145).)	1853–1867	Independent
5th Parliament; 1854–1857	Alexander Tilloch Galt (Note: Elected in by-election, March 8, 1853: Côté, Political Appointments and Elections in the Province of Canada, 1841 to 1860, p. 62, note (145).)	1853–1867	Independent Liberal
6th Parliament; 1858–1861	Alexander Tilloch Galt	1853–1867	Liberal-Conservative
7th Parliament; 1861–1863	Alexander Tilloch Galt	1853–1867	Conservative
8th Parliament; 1863–1867	Alexander Tilloch Galt	1853–1867	Confederation; Conservative

== Abolition ==
The district was abolished on July 1, 1867, when the British North America Act, 1867 came into force, creating Canada and splitting the Province of Canada into Quebec and Ontario. It was succeeded by electoral districts of the same name in the House of Commons of Canada and the Legislative Assembly of Quebec.

== See also ==
- List of elections in the Province of Canada
