= David Christie (politician) =

Canadian politician

The Honourable David Christie PC
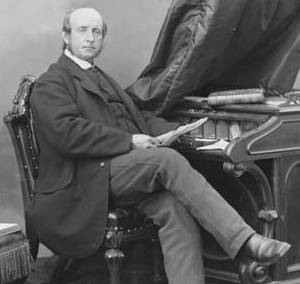

Canadian Senator from Ontario
- In office 1867–1880
- Appointed by: Royal Proclamation

Speaker of the Senate of Canada
- In office 9 January 1874 – 16 October 1878
- Nominated by: Alexander Mackenzie
- Appointed by: The Earl of Dufferin
- Monarch: Victoria
- Preceded by: Pierre-Joseph-Olivier Chauveau
- Succeeded by: Robert Duncan Wilmot

Personal details
- Born: October 1, 1818 Edinburgh, Scotland
- Died: December 14, 1880 (aged 62) Paris, Ontario, Canada
- Party: Liberal

David Christie, PC (October 1, 1818 – 14 December 1880) was a Canadian politician.

== Background ==
Born in Edinburgh, Scotland, he came to Canada with his family in 1833.

In 1852, he was elected to the 4th Parliament of the Province of Canada. He was re-elected to the 5th Parliament of the Province of Canada and 6th Parliament of the Province of Canada. David Christie was in frequent contact with George Brown who published The Globe newspaper.

In the fall of 1849, David Christie was a founding member of the Clear Grit movement. Along with other Clear Grit supporters, Christie argued for a Canadian brand of republicanism that included the election of a deep number of government representatives. David Christie also coined the term Clear Grit according to Charles Dent, who traces the term to a discussion between Christie and George Brown where Christie criticised any Reformer who would hang back like Brown, declaring "We want only men who are Clear Grit".

In 1858, he was elected to the Legislative Council of the Province of Canada. In 1867, he was summoned to the Senate of Canada representing the senatorial division of Erie, Ontario. A Liberal, the Honourable David Christie served until his death in 1880. From 1873 to 1874, he was the Secretary of State of Canada. From 1874 to 1878, he was the Speaker of the Senate of Canada. He died in Paris, Ontario in 1880 of complications arising from gangrene.

== See also ==
- Canada, Kansas
