= John Yule (Canadian politician) =

Canadian businessman, seigneur and political figure

Member of the Legislative Assembly of the Province of Canada for Chambly
- In office 1841–1843
- Preceded by: New position
- Succeeded by: Louis Lacoste

Personal details
- Born: November 21, 1812
- Died: November 27, 1886 (aged 74) Chambly, Lower Canada
- Resting place: St. Stephen's Anglican church, Chambly
- Party: Unionist; Government supporter
- Spouse(s): (1) Eliza Hall (m. 1845) (2) Eliza Maria Eliot (m. 1856)
- Children: At least one son
- Occupation: Businessman

John Yule (November 21, 1812 – November 27, 1886) was a businessman, seigneur and political figure in Canada East in the Province of Canada (now Quebec). He lived all his life in the town of Chambly, south of Montreal. He had considerable business success providing supplies to the British Army garrison at Fort Chambly, as well as a variety of business activities in the Chambly area. He was responsible for the construction of the first bridge at Chambly across the River Richelieu. Yule represented the Chambly riding in the Legislative Assembly of the Province of Canada from 1841 to 1843, as a unionist and Tory.

== Early life and family ==
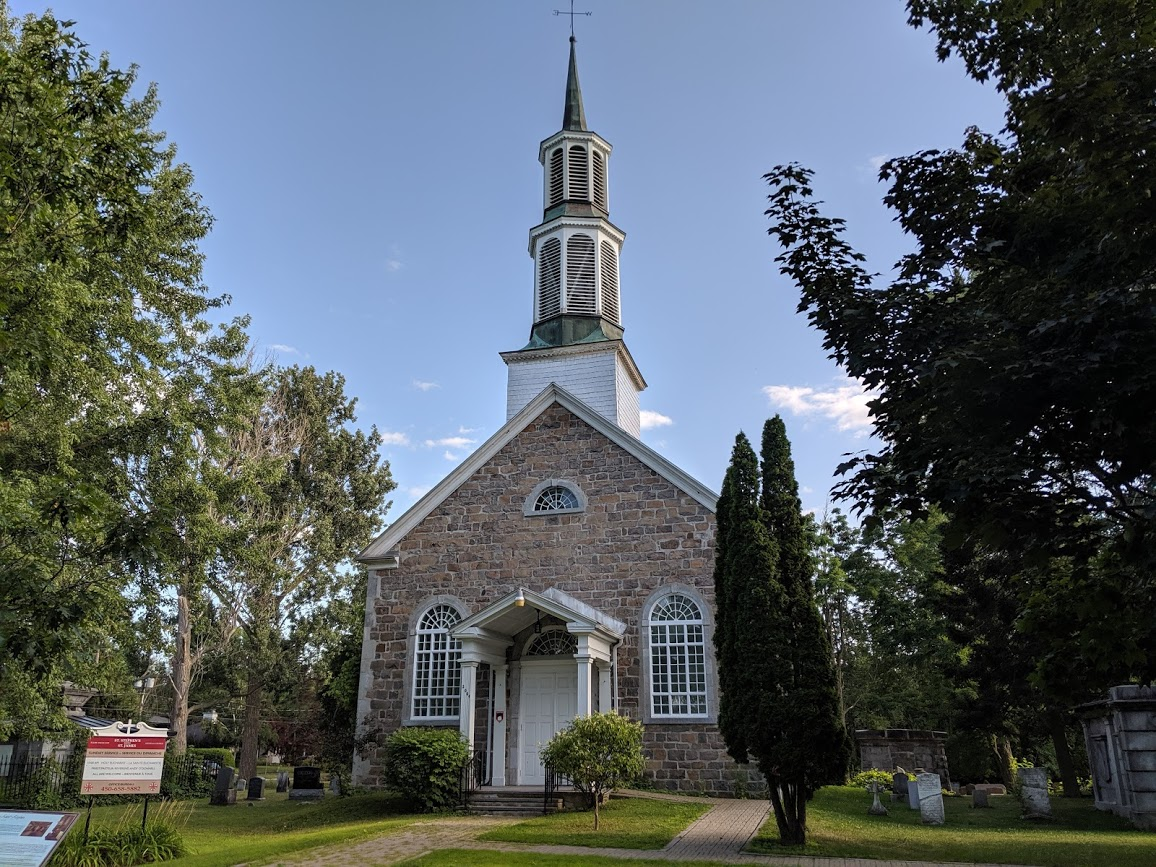
St Stephen's Anglican Church, Chambly

Yule was the son of William Yule and Philo Letitia Ash. He was probably born in Chambly, Lower Canada, and was baptised in the Anglican Garrison Church in Montreal. He was named for his uncle John Yule. His father and uncle were immigrants to Lower Canada from Ayrshire, Scotland. His father originally was employed managing property for the Christie family, before the brothers made their fortune working for themselves, including providing supplies to the British Army garrison at Fort Chambly. His uncle, John Yule, built an impressive manor house at Chambly, which is now on the registry of Canada's Historic Places.

Yule was married twice. His first marriage was to Eliza Hall, in Manchester, England, around 1845. In 1856, he married Eliza Maria Eliot, daughter of a British army officer, Major Francis Breynton Eliot. The marriage was performed at St. Stephen's, the army garrison church in Chambly.

Yule had at least one son, William Andrew Yule.

Yule died in Montreal at the age of 74 and was buried at St. Stephen's church in Chambly.

== Business career ==
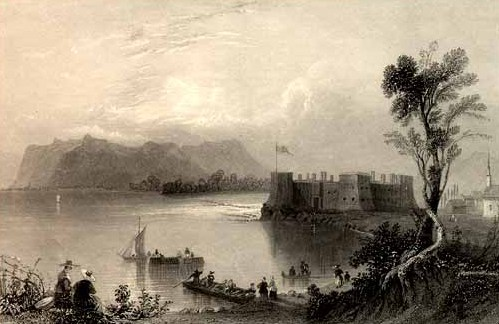
Fort Chambly in 1840

Yule followed the business pattern set by his father and uncle. He provided timber and supplies to the British garrison at Fort Chambly, and built a dam to be able to operate a flour mill and a sawmill. He was also a shareholder and manager of enterprises involved in finances, the timber trade, shipping, railways and other industry. He formed a company to purchase and operate the toll road from Chambly from 1852 to 1856. Yule's mother had acquired the seigneury of Chambly-Est from the Christie family, which he later inherited, as well as the large manor house, Chambly Castle, which the Christies had owned.

In 1845, Yule obtained a statutory right to build a toll bridge crossing the River Richelieu, linking Chambly with the other bank of the river, and to operate it for fifty years. At that time, the bridge would become the property of the Crown and Yule or his successors would be paid the current value of the bridge. Yule built the bridge and then operated it, followed by his son William Andrew Yule. At the end of the fifty years, a dispute arose as to whether the federal government was liable to pay for the cost of the bridge, since the federal government had not existed in 1845. The Supreme Court of Canada held that the federal government had acquired the liability of the former Province of Canada, and was required to pay William Yule for the cost of the bridge. Although the original wooden bridge was destroyed in a fire, it was replaced. The current bridge, the fourth in that location, is named the Pont Yule in remembrance of Yule.

== Political career ==
Following the rebellion in Lower Canada, and the similar rebellion in 1837 in Upper Canada (now Ontario), the British government decided to merge the two provinces into a single province, as recommended by Lord Durham in the Durham Report. The Union Act, 1840, passed by the British Parliament, abolished the two provinces and their separate parliaments, and created the Province of Canada, with a single parliament for the entire province, composed of an elected Legislative Assembly and an appointed Legislative Council. The Governor General retained a strong position in the government.

The general election for the first Legislative Assembly of the new province was held in 1841. Yule stood for election in the Chambly riding. At the age of 29, Yule was elected to the Legislative Assembly, defeating Louis-Michel Viger, who had held the seat in the Legislative Assembly of Lower Canada. He supported the government of the Governor General, Lord Sydenham, and also the union of the two provinces into the Province of Canada. He resigned his seat in the Assembly in September 1843.

Yule was mayor of Chambly from 1849 to 1872. He also served several terms as churchwarden at St. Stephen's.

== See also ==
1st Parliament of the Province of Canada
