= Thomas Marchildon =

Canadian politician

Thomas Marchildon (February 27, 1805 – May 17, 1858) was a businessman, farmer and political figure in Canada East.

He was born in Batiscan in 1805 and became a farmer there. With one of his brothers, he also owned a shipbuilding yard. Marchildon was elected to the Legislative Assembly of the Province of Canada for Champlain in 1851; he was reelected in 1854 as a member of the parti rouge. In 1858, he was defeated in the same riding by his cousin, Joseph-Édouard Turcotte. He opposed the construction of the North Shore Railway.

In 1858, he was found drowned in the well on his farm. He was believed to have suffered an attack of apoplexy although some people thought that he had committed suicide; the coroner found that his death had been accidental.

Political offices
Preceded by Louis Guillet, Reformer	MLA, District of Champlain; 1851–1858	Succeeded by Joseph-Édouard Turcotte, Parti bleu
