= Noël Hébert =

Canadian politician

Member of the Legislative Assembly of the Province of Canada for Mégantic
- In office 1858–1863

Personal details
- Born: December 24, 1819 Nicolet, Quebec, Canada
- Died: 1868 (aged 48–49) Kaskaskia, Illinois, Canada
- Party: Independent
- Spouse: Thérèse Bourk (m. 1849)
- Occupation: farmer, politician

Noël Hébert (December 24, 1819 – 1868) was a farmer and political figure in Canada East. He represented Mégantic in the Legislative Assembly of the Province of Canada from 1858 to 1863.

He was born Pierre-Noël Hébert in Nicolet, the son of Pierre Hébert, a farmer of Acadian descent, and Louise Manseau. Hébert operated a farm near Arthabaskaville and served as a captain in the militia for Mégantic County. In 1849, he married Thérèse Bourk. He was defeated when he ran for reelection to the assembly in 1863. Hébert died in Kaskaskia, Illinois.
