= John McVeagh Lumsden =

John McVeagh Lumsden (September 7, 1823 – September 27, 1898) was a political figure in Canada West. He represented South Ontario in the Legislative Assembly of the Province of Canada from 1854 to 1857.

He was born in Meerut, India, the son of Thomas Lumsden and Hay Burnett, both natives of Scotland, and was educated in Kent, England, and Aberdeenshire. Lumsden came to Lower Canada in 1840, residing in Quebec City with his uncle David Burnet. After four years, he moved to Whitby in Canada West, moving to Pickering two years later. He served as reeve of Pickering township and was a member of the councils for York and Ontario counties. In 1858, he moved to Arran Township in Bruce County. Lumsden served as reeve of Arran and on the council for Huron and Bruce county. He married Margaret Ballengal MacKay in 1864. In 1876, he moved to North Dumfries township, where he lived until his death at the age of 75. Lumsden served as reeve for North Dumfries from 1885 to 1887 and was elected mayor of Galt in 1888, 1889 and 1892.

His brother Hugh David Lumsden was chief engineer for the Canadian Pacific Railway.
