= Antoine-Némèse Gouin =

Antoine-Némèse Gouin (February 25, 1821 – June 10, 1899) was a lawyer and political figure in Canada East. He represented Richelieu in the Legislative Assembly of the Province of Canada from 1851 to 1854.

He was born Antoine Gouin in Sorel, Lower Canada, the son of Charles Gouin and Marguerite Richer-Laflèche, was educated at the Séminaire de Saint-Hyacinthe and went on to study law with Côme-Séraphin Cherrier. Gouin was admitted to the Lower Canada bar in 1844 and set up practice in Montreal, later moving to Sorel. He did not run for reelection to the assembly in 1854. In 1858, Gouin was named prothonotary for the Superior Court at Sorel as well as secretary for the circuit court of Richelieu district. He married Adèle-Catherine Penton in 1863. Gouin died in Sorel at the age of 78.

His nephew Lomer Gouin served in the Quebec Legislative Council and the Canadian House of Commons.
