= Seneca Paige =

Seneca Paige (February 11, 1788 – October 11, 1856) was an American-born businessman and political figure in Canada East. He represented Missisquoi in the Legislative Assembly of the Province of Canada from 1851 to 1854. His surname also appears as Page.

He was born in Hardwick, Massachusetts, the son of Foster Paige, and came to Lower Canada around 1816. He was a wood merchant and building contractor at Dunham. He is believed to have been involved in counterfeiting American money. Paige received a land grant in Dunham township in 1837. He married Mary Ann Lee, probably at Dunham. Paige also served as a justice of the peace. He did not run for reelection in 1854. Paige died at Dunham at the age of 68 and was buried in Vermont.
