= John Loux =

John William Loux (/laʊks/; 1818 – December 20, 1886) was a farmer, miller and political figure in Canada West, He represented Russell in the Legislative Assembly of the Province of Canada from 1858 to 1861. His surname also appears as Loucks.

He was born John William Loucks, the son of John William Loucks and Alta Moseley. Loux served as a Major and Paymaster in the Cornwall Lancers, a volunteer cavalry troop attached to the Stormont Militia that served during the Upper Canada Rebellion. He owned a flour mill and sawmill at Russell, where he settled in 1850. He died in Russell at the age of 68.
