= Portneuf (Province of Canada electoral district) =

Electoral district in former Province of Canada

Province of Canada electoral district

Defunct pre-Confederation electoral district
- Legislature: Legislative Assembly of the Province of Canada
- District created: 1841
- District abolished: 1867
- First contested: 1841
- Last contested: 1863

Portneuf was an electoral district of the Legislative Assembly of the Parliament of the Province of Canada in Canada East (now Quebec), immediately west of Quebec City. It was created in 1841 and was based on the previous electoral district of the same name for the Legislative Assembly of Lower Canada. It was represented by one member in the Legislative Assembly.

The boundaries for the district were altered to some extent by a redistribution of seats in 1854. The electoral district was abolished in 1867, upon the creation of Canada and the province of Quebec.

== Boundaries ==
=== 1841 to 1854 ===
Portneuf electoral district was to the west of Quebec City (now in the Portneuf Regional County Municipality), running from the northern shore of the Saint Lawrence River to the northern boundary of the Province.

The Union Act, 1840, passed by the British Parliament, merged the two provinces of Lower Canada and Upper Canada into the Province of Canada, with a single Parliament. The separate parliaments of Lower Canada and Upper Canada were abolished. The Union Act provided that the pre-existing electoral boundaries of Lower Canada and Upper Canada would continue to be used in the new Parliament, unless altered by the Union Act itself.

The Lower Canada electoral district of Portneuf County was not altered by the Act. The district therefore continued with the same boundaries which had been set by a statute of Lower Canada in 1829:

The County of Portneuf shall be bounded on the north east by the south west boundary line of the Seigniories of Sillery and St. Gabriel, and by a prolongation of the said line, on the south west by the north east boundary line of the Seigniory of Sainte Anne and its augmentation and by a prolongation of the said line, on the north west by the northern boundary of the Province, and on the south east by the River Saint Lawrence; which County so bounded comprises the Seigniories of Gaudarville, Fossambault, Desmaures or Saint Augustin, Guillaume Bonhomme, Neuville or Pointe aux Trembles, Bourg-Louis, Belair and its augmentation, Dauteuil, Jacques Cartier, Barony of Portneuf, Perthuis, Deschambault, Lachevrotiere, La Tesserie, Francheville, Grondines, reste des Grondines, and their augmentations.

=== 1854 to 1867 ===
In 1853, the Parliament of the Province of Canada passed a new electoral map. The boundaries of Nicolet were altered to some extent by the new map, which came into force in the general elections of 1854:

The County of Portneuf shall be bounded on the north-east by the County of Quebec as above described and the prolongation of the south-western line thereof to the limits of the Province, on the south-east by the River Saint Lawrence, on the north-west by the limits of the Province, and on the south-west by the limits of the District of Quebec; the said County so bounded comprising the Parishes of Saint Casimir, Grondines, Deschambault, Cap-Santé, Saint Basile, Saint Raymond, Sainte Catherine, Ecureuils, Pointe-aux-Trembles, Saint Augustin, Saint Alban, and the Townships of Gosford, Alton, Roquemont, Colbert and Montauban.

== Members of the Legislative Assembly (1841–1867) ==
Portneuf was a single-member constituency in the Legislative Assembly.

The following were the members of the Legislative Assembly for Portneuf. The party affiliations are based on the biographies of individual members given by the National Assembly of Quebec, as well as votes in the Legislative Assembly. "Party" was a fluid concept, especially during the early years of the Province of Canada.

Parliament	Members	Years in Office	Party
1st Parliament; 1841–1844	Thomas Cushing Aylwin (Note: Seat vacated on September 24, 1842, on appointment as Solicitor-General of Canada East, an office of profit under the Crown; reelected in a ministerial by-election, October 20, 1842: Côté, Appointments and Elections, p. 59, note (32).)	1841–1844	Anti-unionist; French-Canadian Group
2nd Parliament; 1844–1847	Lewis Thomas Drummond	1844–1847	"English" Liberal
3rd Parliament; 1848–1851	Édouard L.A.C. Juchereau Duchesnay	1848–1851	French-Canadian Group
4th Parliament; 1851–1854	Ulric-Joseph Tessier	1851–1854	Ministerialist
5th Parliament; 1854–1857	Joseph-Élie Thibaudeau	1854–1861	Bleu
6th Parliament; 1858–1861	Joseph-Élie Thibaudeau	1854–1861	Rouge
7th Parliament; 1861–1863	Jean-Docile Brousseau	1861–1867	Bleu
8th Parliament; 1863–1867	Jean-Docile Brousseau	1861–1867	Confederation; Bleu

== Abolition ==
The district was abolished on July 1, 1867, when the British North America Act, 1867 came into force, splitting the Province of Canada into Quebec and Ontario. It was succeeded by electoral districts of the same name and boundaries in the House of Commons of Canada and the Legislative Assembly of Quebec.

== See also ==
- List of elections in the Province of Canada
