= Alanson Cooke =

Canadian politician

Alanson Cooke (September 23, 1811 – April 28, 1904) was a Canadian businessman and political figure.

He was born in L'Orignal, Upper Canada in 1811, the son of an American-born lumber merchant. He took over his father's business around 1837. He was agent for the seigneury of Petite-Nation and managed the sawmill there; Cooke later became owner of the sawmill. He served in the local militia, becoming lieutenant-colonel in 1860. In 1845, he became a member of the municipal council for Petite-Nation. In 1854, he was elected to the Legislative Assembly of the Province of Canada for the County of Ottawa. He was mayor of Saint-André-Avellin from 1862 to 1864 and also served as a member of the council for Ottawa County.

He died at Hintonburg (later part of Ottawa) in 1904 and was buried at Papineauville, Quebec.
