= Robert Craik =

Robert Craik (1812 – 1867) was a Scottish-born farmer and politician in Canada West. He served as the representative for Middlesex East in the Legislative Assembly of the Province of Canada from 1860 to 1861.

He was born in Duns, Berwickshire and immigrated to Canada in 1832. In 1833, Craik married Catherine Riddle and the couple had five children. He served as reeve for North Dorchester township from 1854 to 1857 and was elected warden for Middlesex County in 1857. Craik was elected to the assembly as a Reformer in a by-election following the death of Marcus Talbot.

He died in Putnamville, in North Dorchester township.
