= George Macbeth (politician) =

Canadian politician

George Macbeth (November 4, 1825 – June 3, 1870) was a businessman and political figure in Canada West.

He was born in the Red River Colony in what is now Manitoba in 1825, the son of Scottish immigrants. In 1838, his family settled in western Upper Canada. Macbeth was employed by Colonel Thomas Talbot as an assistant and helped to manage his properties. In 1849, after a dispute with his family, Talbot made Macbeth an heir to a large part of the estate. In 1852, he moved to London.

In 1854, he was elected to the 6th Parliament of the Province of Canada representing West Elgin; he was elected in 1858 and 1861, but was unseated for election corruption in 1863. In 1867, he was elected as an alderman on the city council for London. He was a lieutenant colonel in the local militia which he helped establish. He was connected with railway development and several businesses based in the area.

He married Anne Gilbert Sanders, daughter of John Sanders and Anne Gilbert, in 1852 in Dunwich Township in Elgin County, Ontario. They had six children, Talbot in 1853, Mary in 1855, George Morrison in 1856, John in 1859, Annie Isobel in 1860 and Constance in 1862. George Morrison's daughter Meta was the first woman in London, Ontario to receive her driver's license and Talbot was a judge. George died at London in 1870.
