= George Southwick (Canadian politician) =

Canadian physician and politician (1808–1891)

George Southwick (1808 – May 6, 1891) was a physician and political figure in Canada West. He represented East Elgin in the Legislative Assembly of the Province of Canada from 1854 to 1857 as a Reformer.

He was born in Twelve Mile Creek, Upper Canada. He studied medicine with Dr. Josiah Goodhue in Saint Thomas and then with Dr. Duncombe, going on to study at the Western College of Physicians and Surgeons in New York state. In 1835, Southwick passed his examination by the Upper Canada medical board, practising in the United States for some time before setting up practice in Saint Thomas in 1839. He also operated a drug store there. Southwick was married three times and had one son and four daughters. His daughter Mary Helen married E. Jones Parke, the son of Thomas Parke. Southwick served as mayor of Saint Thomas from 1862 to 1864. He died at the age of 83 after being an invalid for many years.
