= Edwin Larwill =

Edwin Larwill (c. 1806 – December 29, 1876) was a tinsmith and political figure in Canada West.

He came to Chatham in 1841. He helped form a "Free and Easy Club" there, a counter-attack against the Temperance movements in the region. Larwill served as school commissioner. He was opposed to black settlement in the area and debated the issue with William King at a public debate held in 1849. In 1854, he was elected to the Legislative Assembly of the Province of Canada for Kent as a Conservative. Larwill voted for Quebec City over Kingston as seat of government for the Canadas. This unpopular position and organized opposition by black residents of the county led to his defeat in 1857; Archibald McKellar was elected in Kent. Larwill died in Chatham in 1876.
