= Herbert Biggar =

Herbert Biggar (January 6, 1809 – 1892) was a merchant, farmer and political figure in Canada West. He represented East Brant in the Legislative Assembly of the Province of Canada from 1854 to 1861 as a Reformer.

He was born in Queenston, Upper Canada, the son of Robert Biggar. He assisted his father on the family farm until the age of 30, when he entered business with his brother Hamilton in Brantford. He later returned to farming. Biggar served on the council for Brantford Township and on the council for Brant County, also serving as township reeve. Biggar was married twice: first to Jane Ellis in 1831 and then, in 1874, to Marion Long.

He was defeated by William Ryerson when he ran for reelection to the assembly in 1861.
