= Joseph Laurin =

Joseph Laurin (October 18, 1811 – March 3, 1888) was a Quebec notary, author and political figure.

He was born in Quebec City in 1811 and studied at the Petit Séminaire de Québec. He taught there and at the Collège de Sainte-Anne-de-la-Pocatière but then articled as a notary, qualifying in 1839. During this period, he also prepared five textbooks intended for use in the province's schools. Laurin set up practice as a notary in Quebec City. In 1840, he became secretary and legal advisor to the Société Amicale et Bienviellante des Charpentiers de Vaisseaux de Québec, an association for workers in the shipbuilding industry. He ran unsuccessfully in 1836 for a seat in the legislative assembly; in 1844, he was elected to the Legislative Assembly of the Province of Canada for Lotbinière as a Reformer; he was reelected in 1848 and 1851. During his time in the assembly, he lobbied for the use of French in the parliament. Laurin helped organize the Association des Notaires du District de Québec, later serving in turn as secretary, treasurer and president. He served on the city council for Quebec City and in the local militia, becoming lieutenant-colonel in 1858. He was also mayor of L'Ancienne-Lorette from 1858 to 1862. In 1868, he was named superintendent of waterfront lots for Quebec and agent for the Lauzon seigneury.

He died at Ancienne-Lorette in 1888.
