= Louis Lacoste =

Canadian politician

The Hon. Louis Lacoste
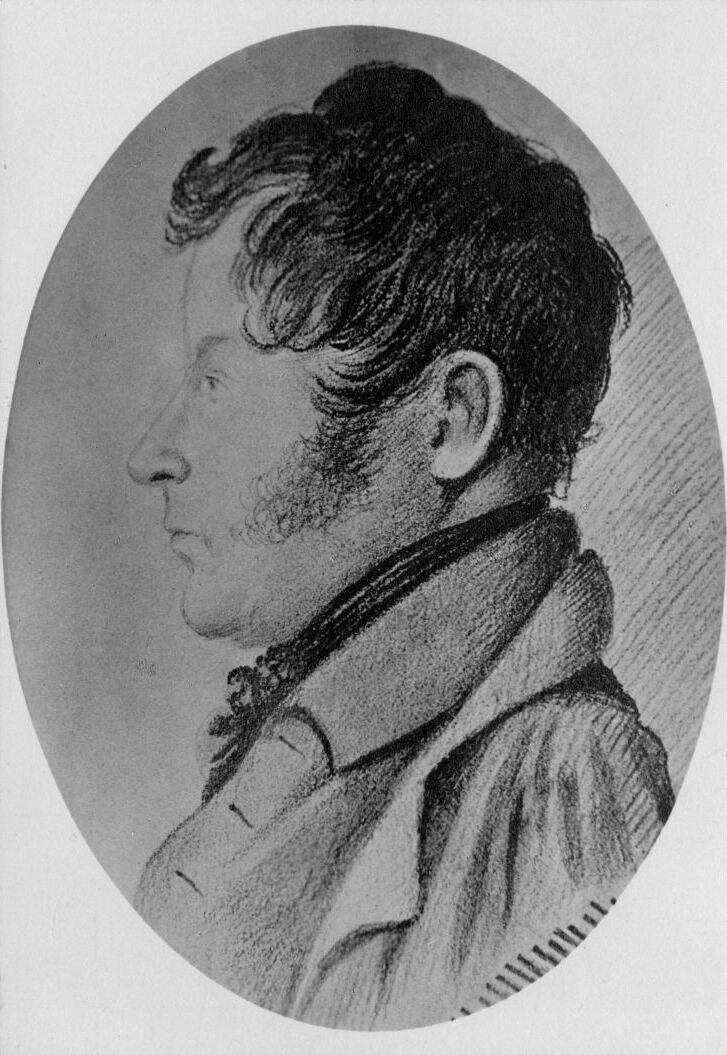

Senator for Montarville, Quebec
- In office October 23, 1867 – November 26, 1878
- Appointed by: Royal Proclamation
- Preceded by: New position
- Succeeded by: Charles Boucher de Boucherville

Member of the Legislative Assembly of Lower Canada for County of Chambly (two-member constituency)
- In office 1834 – March 27, 1838 Serving with Louis-Michel Viger
- Preceded by: Frédéric-Auguste Quesnel
- Succeeded by: None; constitution suspended

Member of the Legislative Assembly of the Province of Canada for Chambly
- In office 1843 – 1847 (by-election and general election)
- Preceded by: John Yule
- Succeeded by: Pierre Beaubien

Personal details
- Born: April 3, 1798 Boucherville, Lower Canada
- Died: November 26, 1878 (aged 80) Boucherville, Quebec
- Party: Lower Canada: Parti patriote Province of Canada: French-Canadian Group; Parliament of Canada: Conservative
- Spouses: (1) Catherine-Renée Boucher de La Bruère (1823–1832); (2) Charlotte Magenty Mount (1836; died soon afterwards); (3) Marie-Antoinette-Thaïs Proulx (1838)
- Children: 2 sons, including Alexandre Lacoste
- Profession: Notary

Louis Lacoste (April 3, 1798 – November 26, 1878) was a notary and political figure in Lower Canada and then Canada East, Province of Canada (now Quebec). He was a member of the Legislative Assembly of Lower Canada, supporting Louis-Joseph Papineau and the Parti patriote. During the Lower Canada Rebellion he was imprisoned without trial, for his activities in the lead-up to the Rebellion. Following the creation of the Province of Canada, he was a member of the new Legislative Assembly for several years, and then a member of the Legislative Council. He was one of the original members of the Senate of Canada from 1867 to 1878.

== Family and early life ==
Lacoste was born in Boucherville in 1798, the son of Louis Lacoste and Joséphine Dubois. He was descended from Alexandre Lacoste, who came from what is now the department of Gard in southern France. Lacoste received his secondary education at the Petit Séminaire de Montréal. He studied law and qualified as a notary on March 19, 1821, opening his practice at Boucherville. Lacoste became one of the leading members of the notarial profession, and eventually was the president of the Chambre des notaires of the Montreal district.

== Lower Canada politics ==
=== Elected to Legislative Assembly, 1834 ===
Lacoste entered politics in 1834 as a candidate for the French-Canadian nationalist party, the Parti patriote. He was elected to represent the county of Chambly in the Legislative Assembly of Lower Canada. He defeated the incumbent, Frédéric-Auguste Quesnel, who had held the seat since 1820, through four previous elections. Louis-Joseph Papineau, the leader of the French-Canadian nationalist party, the Parti patriote, had encouraged Lacoste to challenge Quesnel, because Quesnel, a moderate, had parted company with the Parti patriote and voted against the Ninety-Two Resolutions in the Assembly in February 1834.

Lacoste retained his seat until the suspension of the provincial constitution by the British Parliament in March, 1838, in response to the Lower Canada Rebellion.

=== Role in the Rebellion ===
Lacoste was a strong supporter of the Patriote cause, and was one of the speakers at the Assembly of the Six Counties in October 1837. He made a fiery speech, calling for the replacement of all justices of the peace, arbitrators, and officers of the militia by elections at the county level, since the current officials had been appointed by an "administration hostile to the country". The Lower Canada rebellion broke out in November 1837, and an arrest warrant was issued for Lacoste in December. He voluntarily surrendered to the sheriff. Lacoste was imprisoned in Montreal and held without trial until July 1838, when he was released on bail of £1,000.

After his release, he returned to his notarial practice.

== Province of Canada ==
Following the Lower Canada rebellion and the similar rebellion in 1837 in Upper Canada (now Ontario), the British government decided to merge the two provinces into a single province, as recommended by Lord Durham in the Durham Report. The Union Act, 1840, passed by the British Parliament, abolished the two provinces and their separate parliaments. It created the Province of Canada, with a single Parliament for the entire province, composed of an elected Legislative Assembly and an appointed Legislative Council. The Governor General initially retained a strong position in the government.

Lacoste was elected to the new Legislative Assembly in a by-election in October 1843, again for the Chambly district. In the Assembly, he joined the French-Canadian Group under the leadership of Louis-Hippolyte LaFontaine. Although he was elected late in the 1843 parliamentary session, he was in time to participate in a major political crisis, caused by the resignation of the members of the Executive Council in a dispute with the Governor General, Sir Charles Metcalfe. The leaders of the ministry, LaFontaine and Robert Baldwin, argued that the principle of responsible government required that the Governor General always seek the advice of the Executive Council on policy matters, including the appointment of government officials. When Metcalfe disagreed, all but one of the Council resigned. There was a major debate in the Legislative Assembly on the issue, which passed a motion condemning Metcalfe's actions. Lacoste, like the other members of the French-Canadian Group, voted in favour of the motion.

He was re-elected in 1844. He did not run in 1848 but was elected again in an 1849 by-election and re-elected in 1851. He was elected again in 1858 and resigned in 1861 to run for a seat in the Legislative Council for Montarville division in 1861. He held that position until Confederation in 1867.

== Senate of Canada ==
Lacoste was one of the original members of the Senate of Canada. He was named to the Senate under the proclamation bringing the British North America Act, 1867 into force.

== Marriages and family ==
Lacoste was married three times. He was the father of Alexandre Lacoste, who also became a member of the Senate, and then Chief Justice of the Quebec Court of King's Bench.

He died in Boucherville in 1878 while still in office.
