= John Greaves Clapham =

Canadian politician (c.1796–c.1854

John Greaves Clapham (c. 1796 – 1854 or later) was a businessman and political figure in Lower Canada and Canada East.

Clapham was a merchant at Quebec City. In 1816, he married Helena, the daughter of judge Henry Black. Clapham was elected to the Legislative Assembly of Lower Canada for Mégantic in 1834. He served as lieutenant with the Queen's Volunteers during the Lower Canada Rebellion. In 1851, he was elected to the Legislative Assembly of the Province of Canada for Mégantic.

He died in 1874.
