= Roderick McDonald =

Roderick McDonald (died April 7, 1885) was a medical doctor and political figure in Canada West. He represented the town of Cornwall in the Legislative Assembly of the Province of Canada from 1852 to 1857.

He was the son of John McDonald, who settled on the Raisin River near St. Andrew's, and Ann McGillis. McDonald studied medicine at McGill University and graduated in 1834, he practised in Cornwall. He served as treasurer for the Stormont, Dundas and Glengarry United Counties and as lieutenant-colonel in the militia.

McDonald died on 7 April 1885.
