= Pierre Labelle =

Member of the Legislative Assembly of the Province of Canada for Laval
- In office 1854–1861

Personal details
- Born: October 27, 1808 Laval, Quebec, Canada
- Died: 1864*
- Party: Independent
- Spouse: Émilie Boisseau (m. 1859)
- Occupation: farmer, construction contractor, and politician

Pierre Labelle (October 27, 1808 – 1864 or later) was a farmer, construction contractor and political figure in Canada East. He represented Laval in the Legislative Assembly of the Province of Canada from 1854 to 1861.

He was born in Saint-Vincent-de-Paul, the son of Joseph Labelle and Catherine Bleau, and built a number of buildings in Montreal. In 1830, he married Émilie Boisseau. Labelle served on the municipal council for Montreal from 1852 to 1859. He resigned his seat after being named superintendent of public works in 1861.
