= Hippolyte Dubord =

Canadian politician

Hippolyte Dubord (November 25, 1801 – October 9, 1872) was a Quebec ship builder and political figure.

He was born in Bonaventure, Lower Canada in 1801 and moved to Quebec City with his family. He built his first ship, the Bonaparte, in 1827. In 1836, he was named justice of the peace. He was elected to the Legislative Assembly of Lower Canada for the Lower Town of Quebec in 1834, serving until 1838, when the constitution was suspended following the Lower Canada Rebellion. Dubord had built four ships by 1845, then built 23 more by 1855 and built 25 between 1856 and 1869, when he gave up ship building. He was elected to the Legislative Assembly of the Province of Canada for the city of Quebec in 1851; he did not run in 1854 and was elected again in 1858. His election was declared invalid in 1860 and he was defeated by Pierre-Gabriel Huot in the by-election that followed.

In 1872, Dubord fell to his death at night after stepping out a fourth story window of a hotel at Quebec City; he was believed to have been disoriented, believing that he was in his bedroom at home, and the death was ruled accidental.
