= Jesse Delong =

Canadian politician and farmer

Jesse Delong (1805–1868) was a farmer and political figure in Canada West.

He was born in South Crosby Township, Upper Canada in 1805, the son of George Delong, who settled there after leaving Vermont in 1795. He was the first reeve for South Crosby. He was elected to the Legislative Assembly of the Province of Canada for the electoral district of Leeds in a by-election in 1853, and then elected to the new district of South Leeds in the general elections of 1854. Delong was a member of the township council for South Crosby at the time of his death in 1868.

Delong was appointed a Captain in the 9th (Crosby) Battalion, Leeds Militia in May 1857.

His daughter Abigail married Lewis Chipman, who was superintendent of schools and township clerk for Bastard Township.
