= Basil R. Church =

Canadian politician

Basil Rorison Church (August 28, 1800– 5 April 1858) was a medical doctor and political figure in Canada West.

He was born in Elizabethtown Township in 1800 and settled in Wolford Township, where he was later appointed magistrate. Church was licensed to practice medicine in 1828. He represented North Leeds and Grenville in the Legislative Assembly of the Province of Canada from 1854 to 1858. He was a member of the Universalist Church. He died in Toronto while still in office.

His nephew, Levi Ruggles Church, represented the County of Ottawa and then Pontiac in the Legislative Assembly of Quebec.
