= Hannibal Hodges Whitney =

Hannibal Hodges Whitney (ca. 1815 – 1861 or later) was a merchant and political figure in Canada East. He represented West Missisquoi and then Missisquoi in the Legislative Assembly of the Province of Canada from 1854 to 1861.

He was born in Saint-Armand-Est, the son of John B. Whitney and Lucy Leonard, and became involved in the business of importing goods at Montreal. In 1844, he married Mary Ballard Gregory. Whitney was a member of the municipal council from 1851 to 1859. He did not run for reelection to the assembly in 1861. Whitney is thought to have died in Montreal in 1861 or later.

His cousins, John K. and Bartholomew Whitney, served in the Vermont assembly.
