= Joseph Laporte =

Canadian politician (1854–1861)

Member of the Legislative Assembly of the Province of Canada for Hochelaga
- In office 1854–1861

Personal details
- Born: September 20, 1806 Pointe-aux-Trembles, Quebec, Canada
- Died: January 20, 1883 (aged 76) Pointe-aux-Trembles, Quebec, Canada
- Party: Independent
- Spouse: Desanges Messier (m. 1830)
- Occupation: farmer, politician

Joseph Laporte (September 20, 1806 – August 19, 1862) was a farmer and political figure in Canada East. He represented Hochelaga in the Legislative Assembly of the Province of Canada from 1854 to 1861.

He was born in Pointe-aux-Trembles, the son of Charles Laporte and Josephte Christin dit Saint-Amour. Laporte was also a justice of the peace. In 1830, he married Desanges Messier. He was defeated when he ran for reelection to the assembly in 1861. Laporte died in Pointe-aux-Trembles at the age of 55.
