= Henry Wellesly McCann =

Henry Wellesly McCann (c. 1819 – ????) was an Irish-born farmer and political figure in Canada West.

He was the son of John McCann, an officer in the British Army, and was educated in Canada. McCann was a farmer at Hawkesbury and served as captain in the local militia. He served as crown land agent for Prescott and Russell counties for ten years. He married Ann McLean. McCann was elected to the Legislative Assembly of the Province of Canada for Prescott in 1954 and was re-elected in 1858 and 1861.
