= John Meagher (Canada East politician) =

- Born: 1805
- Died: 1876 (aged 70–71)

John Meagher (c. 1805 – March 11, 1876) was an Irish-born merchant and political figure in Canada East. He represented Bonaventure in the Legislative Assembly of the Province of Canada from 1854 to 1861 as a Reformer.

He established himself in the timber trade at Carleton. Meagher was lieutenant-colonel in the local militia. He married Mary Ann Drake. Meagher ran unsuccessfully for a seat in the assembly in 1848. He was defeated when he ran for reelection in 1861. Meagher died at Carleton.
