= Bagot (Province of Canada electoral district) =

Defunct federal electoral district in Quebec, Canada

Coordinates: 45°42′N 72°38′W

Province of Canada electoral district

Defunct pre-Confederation electoral district
- Legislature: Legislative Assembly of the Province of Canada
- District created: 1853
- District abolished: 1935
- First contested: 1854
- Last contested: 1930

The district of Bagot was established under the Parliamentary Representation Act of 1853.

Across 17 federal elections, the riding of Bagot elected eight Conservative representatives and eight Liberal representatives.

== See also ==
- History of Canada
- History of Quebec
- Bagot Federal Electoral District
- Bagot Provincial Electoral District
- Politics of Canada
- Politics of Quebec
