= Noël Darche =

Noël Darche (May 24, 1809 – February 8, 1874) was a farmer and political figure in Canada East. He represented Chambly in the Legislative Assembly of the Province of Canada from 1854 to 1858 as a member of the Parti rouge.

He was born in Chambly, the son of Noël Darche and Marie Papineau. Darche farmed in the Chambly area. He was an unsuccessful candidate for the Chambly seat in the assembly in 1858 and 1863. Darche died in Chambly at the age of 64. He never married.
