= Joseph-Hilarion Jobin =

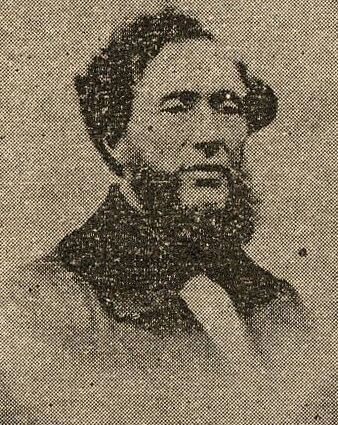
Joseph Hilarion Jobin

Joseph-Hilarion Jobin (October 25, 1811 – August 31, 1881) was a notary and political figure in Canada East.

He represented Berthier from 1851 to 1854 and Joliette from 1854 to 1863 in the Legislative Assembly of the Province of Canada.

He was born in Montréal, the son of Joseph Jobin and Marie-Rachel Travé dit Saint-Romain, and was educated at the Petit Séminaire de Montréal. He apprenticed as a notary with his uncle André Jobin, was admitted to practice in 1833 and set up practice in Montreal. Jobin also served as a justice of the peace. In 1832, he married Rachel-Charlotte Desautels. Jobin did not run for reelection to the assembly in 1863. He died in Montreal at the age of 69 and was buried in the Notre Dame des Neiges Cemetery.
