= David Barker Stevenson =

Canadian businessman and politician

David Barker Stevenson (November 17, 1801 – March 3, 1859) was a businessman and politician in Canada West.

He was born in Clinton, New York in 1801. After his father died, he moved to Hallowell Township in Upper Canada to work in his uncle's general store. After his uncle's death in 1833, he continued to operate the store in partnership with his aunt until 1848, when he formed a partnership with Thomas Nichol. In 1834, he became a magistrate in the Prince Edward District. He also sold timber, real estate and operated a distillery. In 1836, he became the president of the Mutual Fire Insurance Company in the Prince Edward District. He was a district councillor for the township from 1842 to 1849 and district warden from 1847 to 1849. In 1848, he was elected to the Legislative Assembly of the Province of Canada for Prince Edward; he was reelected in 1851 and 1854. He was also mayor of Picton in 1854. He supported John A. Macdonald in the assembly. He opposed representation by population and supported Kingston as capital of the province.

He died in Picton in 1859.
