= William Patrick (Canadian politician) =

Canadian politician (1810–1883)

William Patrick (February 21, 1810 – August 6, 1883) was a clergyman, merchant and political figure in Canada West. He represented Grenville County and later Grenville South in the Legislative Assembly of the Province of Canada from 1854 to 1863.

He was born in Scarborough, Upper Canada, the son of Asa Patrick, a Scottish immigrant, and Belinda Gilbert, and was educated by the Reverend John Strachan. A Methodist, he studied at the Cazenovia Seminary in New York and was ordained a minister in 1833. Patrick married Abigail Ann, the daughter of George Brouse, in 1835. Problems with his voice led him to leave the ministry and he opened a store in Kemptville in 1836. Patrick moved to Prescott in 1839. He was an agent for the Provincial Mutual and General Insurance Company and a director of the Ottawa and Prescott Railway. Patrick was elected mayor of Prescott in 1872 and was treasurer for the town from 1873 to 1876. From 1873 to 1883, he was sheriff for Leeds and Grenville Counties. He moved to Brockville in 1876 and later died there at the age of 73.
