= Thomas Fortier =

Canadian politician (1796–1876)

Thomas Fortier (September 27, 1796 – May 21, 1876) was a medical doctor and political figure in Canada East. He represented Nicolet in the Legislative Assembly of the Province of Canada from 1848 to 1858.

He was born in Quebec City, the son of Joseph Fortier and Rose Laurent, and studied at the Petit Séminaire de Québec and New York University. Fortier served in the militia during the War of 1812, reaching the rank of lieutenant. He was licensed as a physician in Lower Canada in 1814 and practised in Saint-Grégoire, Baie-du-Febvre and Gentilly. He was married twice: first to Eliza Hanna in 1819 and then to Léocadie Grondin in 1834. Fortier served on the local school board and was vice-president in 1845. He wrote articles for the La Gazette in Trois-Rivières, Le Populaire in Montreal and La Gazette in Quebec City. Fortier was a candidate in the 1858 election, but withdrew his candidacy before the election. He died at Gentilly at the age of 79.
