= Megantick (Province of Canada electoral district) =

Electoral district in former Province of Canada

Province of Canada electoral district

Defunct pre-Confederation electoral district
- Legislature: Legislative Assembly of the Province of Canada
- District created: 1841
- District abolished: 1867
- First contested: 1841
- Last contested: 1863

Megantick (French: Mégantic) was an electoral district of the Legislative Assembly of the Parliament of the Province of Canada, in Canada East, in the Eastern Townships. It was created in 1841 and was based on the previous electoral district of the same name for the Legislative Assembly of Lower Canada. It was represented by one member in the Legislative Assembly.

The electoral district was abolished in 1867, upon the creation of Canada and the province of Quebec.

== Boundaries ==
The Union Act, 1840 merged the two provinces of Upper Canada and Lower Canada into the Province of Canada, with a single Parliament. The separate parliaments of Lower Canada and Upper Canada were abolished.

The Union Act provided that the pre-existing electoral boundaries of Lower Canada and Upper Canada would continue to be used in the new Parliament, unless altered by the Union Act itself. The Megantick electoral district of Lower Canada was not altered by the Act, and therefore continued with the same boundaries which had been set by a statute of Lower Canada in 1829:

The County of Megantick shall be bounded on the north west by the south lines of the augmentation of Lotbinière, and part of Saint Jean d'Eschaillons to the River Becancour, being the south east boundary lines of the County of Lotbinière as before described, on the north east in part by the west lateral lines and rear lines of the seigniories of Sainte Croix and Saint Giles, on the west by the east bounds of the township of Stanford, then easterly along the north west bounds of the township of Arthabaska to its intersection with the north west outline of the township of Halifax, thence south westerly along the north west bounds of Halifax, to the northern angle of Chester, thence south easterly along the north east bounds of the townships of Chester, to the most easterly angle of the said township, thence north easterly along the north west outline of the township of Wolfstown, to the most northerly angle of the said township, thence south easterly along the north east boundary line of the said township, to the easterly angle of the same, thence south easterly to the River Chaudière or Lake Megantick; which County so bounded, comprehends the townships of Somerset, Nelson, Halifax, Inverness, Ireland, Wolfston, Leeds, Thetford, Broughton, Colraine, Tring, Shenley, Oulney, Winslow, Dorset and Gayhurst.

The electoral district of Megantick was located in the Eastern Townships (now the Estrie and Chaudière-Appalaches regions).

== Members of the Legislative Assembly ==
Megantick was a single-member constituency.

The following were the members of the Legislative Assembly from Megantick. "Party" was a fluid concept, especially during the early years of the Province of Canada. Party affiliations are based on the biographies of individual members given by the National Assembly of Quebec, as well as votes in the Legislative Assembly.

Parliament	Member	Years in Office	Party
1st Parliament; 1841–1844	Dominick Daly	1841–1848	Unionist; Government supporter; "British" Tory
2nd Parliament; 1844–1848	Dominick Daly	1841–1848	"British" Tory
3rd Parliament; 1848–1851	Dominick Daly (Note: Seat became vacant on Daly accepting appointment to a commission in England, 1849: Côté, Political Appointments and Elections, p. 61, note (105).)	1848–1849	"British" Tory
3rd Parliament; 1848–1851	Dunbar Ross (Note: Elected in by-election, May 1, 1850: Côté, Political Appointments and Elections, p. 61, note (106).)	1850–1851	Ministerialist

== Abolition ==
The district was abolished on July 1, 1867, when the British North America Act, 1867 came into force, splitting the Province of Canada into Quebec and Ontario. It was succeeded by electoral districts of the same name in the House of Commons of Canada and the Legislative Assembly of Quebec.
