= Dunbar Ross =

Dunbar Ross, QC (c. 1800 – May 16, 1865) was a lawyer and political figure in Canada East.

He was born in the British Isles c. 1800 and came to Lower Canada with his family c. 1803. He studied law at the office of the protonotaries of the Court of King's Bench at Quebec, was admitted to the bar in 1834, and set up practice at Quebec City. He was elected to the Legislative Assembly of the Province of Canada for Mégantic in an 1850 by-election but was defeated by John Greaves Clapham in the 1851 general election which followed. Ross was named Queen's Counsel in 1853. He served as solicitor general for Canada East from 1853 to 1857. Ross was elected to the legislative assembly in Beauce in 1854 and again in 1858. He suffered from paralysis after 1860, and died at Quebec City in 1865, and was buried in Mount Hermon Cemetery at Sillery.
