= Joseph Hartman =

Joseph Hartman (January 16, 1821 – November 29, 1859) was a farmer, teacher and political figure in Canada West.

He was born in Whitchurch Township in Upper Canada in 1821, the son of Quakers who had immigrated from Pennsylvania. He taught school in the township and also farmed, later becoming superintendent of education. He served on the council for the Home District from 1847 to 1850, when he was elected to the township council and also became reeve. He served 6 terms as warden for the county. In 1851, he was elected to the Legislative Assembly for the North riding of York; he was reelected in 1854 and 1857, aligning himself with the Clear Grits. He supported representation by population. He died in Whitchurch Township in 1859, after suffering from tuberculosis for a number of years.
