= Timothy Lee Terrill =

Timothy Lee Terrill, QC (March 12, 1815 – August 26, 1879) was a lawyer, farmer and political figure in Canada East.

He was born in Ascot Township, Sherbrooke County in Lower Canada in 1815, the son of Joseph Hazard Terrill, commissioner of small causes for Sherbrooke. He studied law in the office of his brother, Hazard Bailey, and was admitted to the bar in 1840. He was later appointed Queen's Counsel. He served in a cavalry troop during the Lower Canada Rebellion of 1837. When his brother Hazard Bailey died in 1852, he ran for his seat in the Legislative Assembly representing Stanstead in November 1852 and was elected by acclamation. He was re-elected to the same seat in the general elections held in July 1854 and December 1857. In 1856, he became provincial secretary for Canada East; he resigned this office in 1857. He retired from politics in 1861 due to ill health.

He suffered an attack of paralysis and died in Stanstead in 1879.
