= Glengarry (Province of Canada electoral district) =

Province of Canada electoral district

Glengarry Canada West
Province of Canada electoral district

Defunct pre-Confederation electoral district
- Legislature: Legislative Assembly of the Province of Canada
- District created: 1841
- District abolished: 1867
- First contested: 1841
- Last contested: 1863

Glengarry was an electoral district of the Legislative Assembly of the Parliament of the Province of Canada, in Canada West, on the north shore of the Saint Lawrence River, bordering on Canada East. It was created in 1841, upon the establishment of the Province of Canada by the union of Upper Canada and Lower Canada. Glengarry was represented by one member in the Legislative Assembly. It was abolished in 1867, upon the creation of Canada and the province of Ontario.

== Boundaries ==
Glengarry electoral district was located in Canada West (now the province of Ontario), on the north shore of the Saint Lawrence River, bordering on Canada East (now the province of Quebec). It was based on Glengarry County, now part of the United Counties of Stormont, Dundas and Glengarry.

The Union Act, 1840 had merged the two provinces of Upper Canada and Lower Canada into the Province of Canada, with a single Parliament. The separate parliaments of Lower Canada and Upper Canada were abolished. The Union Act provided that the pre-existing electoral boundaries of Upper Canada would continue to be used in the new Parliament, unless altered by the Union Act itself.

Glengarry County had been an electoral district in the Legislative Assembly of Upper Canada, and its boundaries were not altered by the Union Act. Those boundaries had originally been set by a proclamation of the first Lieutenant Governor of Upper Canada, John Graves Simcoe, in 1792:

That the first of the said counties be hereafter called by the name of the county of Glengary; which county is to be bounded on the east by the lines that divide Upper from Lower Canada, on the south by the river St. Lawrence, and westerly by the easternmost boundary of the late township of Cornwall, running north twenty-four degrees west until it intersects the Ottawa or Grand river, thence descending the said river until it meets the divisional lines aforesaid. The said county is to comprehend all the islands in the said river St. Lawrence nearest to the said county, and in the whole or greater part fronting the same.

The boundaries had been further defined by a statute of Upper Canada in 1798:

That the townships of Lancaster, Charlottenburg and Kenyon, together with the tract of land claimed by the St. Regis Indians, and such of the Islands in the river Saint Lawrence as are wholly or in greater part opposite thereto, shall constitute and form the County of Glengary.

Since Glengarry electoral district was not changed by the Union Act, those boundaries continued to be used for the new electoral district. Glengarry was represented by one member in the Legislative Assembly.

== Members of the Legislative Assembly ==
Glengarry was represented by one member in the Legislative Assembly. The following were the members for Glengarry.

Parliament	Years	Member	Party
1st Parliament; 1841–1844	1841–1844	John Sandfield Macdonald	Moderate Tory, then Reformer

== Abolition ==
The district was abolished on July 1, 1867, when the British North America Act, 1867 came into force, creating Canada and splitting the Province of Canada into Quebec and Ontario. It was succeeded by electoral districts of the same name in the House of Commons of Canada and the Legislative Assembly of Ontario.
