= Norfolk (Province of Canada electoral district) =

Province of Canada electoral district

Norfolk Canada West
Province of Canada electoral district

Defunct pre-Confederation electoral district
- Legislature: Legislative Assembly of the Province of Canada
- District created: 1841
- District abolished: 1867
- First contested: 1841
- Last contested: 1863

Norfolk was an electoral district of the Legislative Assembly of the Parliament of the Province of Canada, in Canada West (now Ontario). It was created in 1841, upon the establishment of the Province of Canada by the union of Upper Canada and Lower Canada. Norfolk was represented by one member in the Legislative Assembly. It was abolished in 1867, upon the creation of Canada and the province of Ontario.

== Boundaries ==
Norfolk electoral district was based on Norfolk County, Ontario, on the north shore of Lake Erie.

The Union Act, 1840 had merged the two provinces of Upper Canada and Lower Canada into the Province of Canada, with a single Parliament. The separate parliaments of Lower Canada and Upper Canada were abolished. The Union Act provided that the pre-existing electoral boundaries of Upper Canada would continue to be used in the new Parliament, unless altered by the Union Act itself.

Norfolk County had been an electoral district in the Legislative Assembly of Upper Canada. Its boundaries were not altered by the Union Act. Those boundaries had originally been set by a proclamation of the first Lieutenant Governor of Upper Canada, John Graves Simcoe, in 1792:

That the sixteenth of the said counties be hereafter called by the name of the county of Norfolk; which county is to be bounded on the north and east by the county of Lincoln and the river La Tranche, now called the Thames, on the south side by the lake Erie until it meets the Barlue, to be called the Orwell river, thence by a line running north sixteen degrees west until it intersects the river La Tranche or Thames, thence up the said river until it meets the northwest boundary of the county of York.

The boundaries had been further defined by a statute of Upper Canada in 1798:

33. And be it further enacted by the authority aforesaid, That the townships of Rainham, Walpole, Woodhouse, Charlotteville, Walsingham, Houghton, Middleton, Windham and Townsend, together with Turkey Point, and promontory of Long Point, do constitute and form the County of Norfolk.

Since Norfolk was not changed by the Union Act, those boundaries continued to be used for the new electoral district.

== Members of the Legislative Assembly ==
Norfolk was represented by one member in the Legislative Assembly. The following were the members for Norfolk.

Parliament	Years	Members	Party
1st Parliament; 1841–1844	1841–1847	Israel Wood Powell	Unionist; Moderate Reformer
2nd Parliament; 1844–1847	1841–1847	Israel Wood Powell	Unionist; Moderate Reformer

== Abolition ==
Norfolk electoral district was abolished on July 1, 1867, when the British North America Act, 1867 came into force, creating Canada and splitting the Province of Canada into Quebec and Ontario. It was succeeded by two federal electoral districts and two provincial electoral districts, both called Norfolk North and Norfolk South, in the House of Commons of Canada and the Legislative Assembly of Ontario.
