= Haldimand (Province of Canada electoral district) =

Province of Canada electoral district

Haldimand Canada West
Province of Canada electoral district

Defunct pre-Confederation electoral district
- Legislature: Legislative Assembly of the Province of Canada
- District created: 1841
- District abolished: 1867
- First contested: 1841
- Last contested: 1863

Haldimand was an electoral district of the Legislative Assembly of the Parliament of the Province of Canada, in Canada West. It was based on Haldimand County. The electoral district was created in 1841, upon the establishment of the Province of Canada by the union of Upper Canada and Lower Canada. Haldimand was represented by one member in the Legislative Assembly. It was abolished in 1867, upon the creation of Canada and the province of Ontario.

== Boundaries ==
Haldimand electoral district was located on the north shore of Lake Erie, and was based on Haldimand County, on the Niagara Peninsula.

The Union Act, 1840 had merged the two provinces of Upper Canada and Lower Canada into the Province of Canada, with a single Parliament. The separate parliaments of Lower Canada and Upper Canada were abolished. The Union Act provided that the pre-existing electoral boundaries of Upper Canada would continue to be used in the new Parliament, unless altered by the Union Act itself.

Haldimand County had been an electoral district in the Legislative Assembly of Upper Canada, and its boundaries were not altered by the Union Act. Those boundaries had been set by a statute of Upper Canada in 1798:

That the tract of land on each side of the Grand river, now in the occupation of the Six Nation Indians, and lying to the southward and southeast of Dundas Street, do constitute and form the County of Haldimand.

In 1826, the townships of Walpole and Rainham were annexed to Haldimand from the County of Norfolk, to be closer to the new district town and courthouse.

Since Haldimand electoral district was not changed by the Union Act, those boundaries continued to be used for the new electoral district. Haldimand was represented by one member in the Legislative Assembly.

== Members of the Legislative Assembly ==
Haldimand was represented by one member in the Legislative Assembly. The following were the members for Haldimand.

Parliament	Years	Member	Party
1st Parliament; 1841–1844	1841–1844	David Thompson	Reformer

== Abolition ==
The district was abolished on July 1, 1867, when the British North America Act, 1867 came into force, creating Canada and splitting the Province of Canada into Quebec and Ontario. It was succeeded by electoral districts of the same name in the House of Commons of Canada and the Legislative Assembly of Ontario.
