= Lanark (Province of Canada electoral district) =

Province of Canada electoral district

Lanark Canada West
Province of Canada electoral district

Defunct pre-Confederation electoral district
- Legislature: Legislative Assembly of the Province of Canada
- District created: 1841
- District abolished: 1867
- First contested: 1841
- Last contested: 1863

Lanark was an electoral district of the Legislative Assembly of the Parliament of the Province of Canada, in Canada West (now Ontario). Based on Lanark County, it was created in 1841, upon the establishment of the Province of Canada by the union of Upper Canada and Lower Canada.

Lanark was represented by one member in the Legislative Assembly. It was abolished in 1867, upon the creation of Canada and the province of Ontario.

== Boundaries ==
Lanark electoral district was located in the eastern area of Canada West (now Ontario). It was based on Lanark County. Perth was the major centre.

The Union Act, 1840 had merged the two provinces of Upper Canada and Lower Canada into the Province of Canada, with a single Parliament. The separate parliaments of Lower Canada and Upper Canada were abolished. The Union Act provided that the pre-existing electoral boundaries of Upper Canada would continue to be used in the new Parliament, unless altered by the Union Act itself.

Lanark County had been an electoral district in the Legislative Assembly of Upper Canada. Its boundaries were not altered by the Union Act. The boundaries had been set when Lanark County was created in 1824, when it was severed from Carleton County. The 1824 Upper Canada statute described Lanark as follows:

That the Townships of Bathurst, Drummound, Beckwith, Dalhousie, Lanark, Ramsay, Darling, Levant, North Sherbroke, South Sherbroke, together with ail the unsurveyed lands within the limits of the District of Bathurst, with such of the Islands in the Ottawa River as are wholly, or in greater part, opposite to the said Townships, and unsurveyed land, shall constitute and form the County of Lanark.

Since Lanark was not changed by the Union Act, those boundaries continued to be used for the new electoral district.

== Members of the Legislative Assembly ==
Lanark was represented by one member in the Legislative Assembly. The following were the members for Lanark.

| Parliament | Years | Member | Party |
|---|---|---|---|
| 1st Parliament; 1841–1844 | 1841–1844 | Malcolm Cameron | Unionist; Reform |

== Abolition ==
The electoral district was abolished on July 1, 1867, when the British North America Act, 1867 came into force, creating Canada and splitting the Province of Canada into Quebec and Ontario. It was succeeded by electoral districts Lanark North and Lanark South in the House of Commons of Canada and the Legislative Assembly of Ontario.
