= Brockville (Province of Canada electoral district) =

Electoral district in former Province of Canada

Brockville Canada West
Province of Canada electoral district

Defunct pre-Confederation electoral district
- Legislature: Legislative Assembly of the Province of Canada
- District created: 1841
- District abolished: 1867
- First contested: 1841
- Last contested: 1863

Brockville was an electoral district of the Legislative Assembly of the Parliament of the Province of Canada, in Canada West. It was based on the town of Brockville, on the north shore of the Saint Lawrence River, in the Thousand Islands region. The electoral district was created in 1841, upon the establishment of the Province of Canada by the union of Upper Canada and Lower Canada.

Brockville was represented by one member in the Legislative Assembly. It was abolished in 1867, upon the creation of Canada and the province of Ontario.

== Boundaries ==
Brockville electoral district was based largely on the municipal boundaries of the town of Brockville, located on the north shore of the Saint Lawrence River in the eastern area of Canada West (now the province of Ontario). Brockville was the major centre of the electoral district.

The Union Act, 1840 had merged the two provinces of Upper Canada and Lower Canada into the Province of Canada, with a single Parliament. The separate parliaments of Upper Canada and Lower Canada were abolished. The Union Act provided that the town of Brockville would constitute one electoral district in the Legislative Assembly of the new Parliament, but gave the Governor General of the Province of Canada the power to draw the boundaries for the electoral district.

The first Governor General, Lord Sydenham, issued a proclamation shortly after the formation of the Province of Canada in early 1841, establishing the boundaries for the electoral district:

The Town of Brockville shall be bounded and limited as follows :—commencing on the River Saint Lawrence, in the limit between lots numbers nine and ten of the Township of Elizabethtown; thence north, twenty-four degrees west, fifty-four chains, more or less, to the centre of the first concession; thence south, fifty-five degrees west, eighty chains, more or less, to the limit between lots numbers thirteen and fourteen; thence south, twenty-four degrees east, fifty-six chains, more or less to the River Saint Lawrence; then easterly, along the waters of the Saint Lawrence, to the place of beginning.

== Members of the Legislative Assembly ==
Brockville was represented by one member in the Legislative Assembly. The following were the members for Brockville.

Parliament	Years	Member	Party
1st Parliament; 1841–1844	1841–1844	George Sherwood	Pro-Union; Compact Tory

== Abolition ==
The district was abolished on July 1, 1867, when the British North America Act, 1867 came into force, creating Canada and splitting the Province of Canada into Quebec and Ontario. It was succeeded by electoral districts of the same name in the House of Commons of Canada and the Legislative Assembly of Ontario.
