= François-Xavier Lemieux =

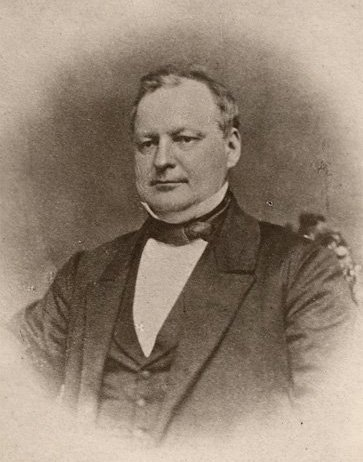

Member of the Legislative Assembly of the Province of Canada
- In office 1847–1861

Member of the Legislative Council of the Province of Canada
- In office 1862–1864

Personal details
- Born: 9 February 1811 Lévis, Lower Canada
- Died: 16 May 1864 (aged 53) Lévis, Quebec

François-Xavier Lemieux (9 February 1811 – 16 May 1864) was a French Canadian lawyer and politician.

He was born at Pointe-Lévy in 1811 and studied at the Petit Séminaire de Québec. He articled in law, was called to the bar in 1839 and set up practice at Quebec City. Lemieux was elected to the Legislative Assembly of the Province of Canada for Dorchester in an 1847 by-election held following the resignation of the previously elected member. He was reelected in 1848 and 1851. Lemieux played an important role in abolishing seigneurial tenure, serving on the commission formed in 1851 and helping to prepare the legislation that put an end to it. He was elected in the new riding of Lévis in 1854; Lemieux served as Commissioner of Public Works from January 1855 to November 1857. He was elected again in 1858, and served briefly as Receiver General in the abortive Brown-Dorion ministry in August of that year. Lemieux was defeated by Joseph-Goderic Blanchet in 1861 but was elected to the Legislative Council of the Province of Canada for La Durantaye division in 1862 and served until his death at Lévis in 1864. He had been named bâtonnier for the Quebec bar in 1863.
