= Oxford (Province of Canada electoral district) =

Province of Canada electoral district

Oxford Canada West
Province of Canada electoral district

Defunct pre-Confederation electoral district
- Legislature: Legislative Assembly of the Province of Canada
- District created: 1841
- District abolished: 1867
- First contested: 1841
- Last contested: 1863

Oxford was an electoral district of the Legislative Assembly of the Parliament of the Province of Canada, in Canada West (now Ontario). It was created in 1841, upon the establishment of the Province of Canada by the union of Upper Canada and Lower Canada. Oxford was represented by one member in the Legislative Assembly. It was split into two ridings in the redistribution of 1853.

== Boundaries ==
Oxford electoral district was based on Oxford County, west of what is now Toronto and inland from Lake Erie, on the Ontario Peninsula. Woodstock was the county seat and major centre.

The Union Act, 1840 had merged the two provinces of Upper Canada and Lower Canada into the Province of Canada, with a single Parliament. The separate parliaments of Lower Canada and Upper Canada were abolished. However, the Union Act provided that the pre-existing electoral boundaries of Upper Canada would continue to be used in the new Parliament, unless altered by the Union Act itself.

Oxford County had been an electoral district in the Legislative Assembly of Upper Canada. Its boundaries were not altered by the Union Act. Those boundaries had originally been set by a statute of Upper Canada in 1798:

That the townships of Burford, Norwich, Dereham, Oxford upon the Thames, Blandford and Blenheim, do constitute and form the County of Oxford.

Since Oxford electoral district was not changed by the Union Act, those boundaries continued to be used for the new electoral district. Oxford was represented by one member in the Legislative Assembly.

== Members of the Legislative Assembly ==
Oxford was represented by one member in the Legislative Assembly. The following were the members for Oxford.

Parliament	Years	Members	Party
1st Parliament; 1841–1844	1841–1844	Francis Hincks	Unionist; Ultra Reformer

== Abolition ==
Oxford electoral district was split into two separate ridings in the redistribution of 1853: Oxford North and Oxford South.
