= Cornwall (Province of Canada electoral district) =

Electoral district of former Province of Canada

Cornwall Canada West
Province of Canada electoral district

Defunct pre-Confederation electoral district
- Legislature: Legislative Assembly of the Province of Canada
- District created: 1841
- District abolished: 1867
- First contested: 1841
- Last contested: 1863

Cornwall was an electoral district of the Legislative Assembly of the Parliament of the Province of Canada, in Canada West. It was based on the town of Cornwall, located on the north shore of the Saint Lawrence River. The electoral district was created in 1841, upon the establishment of the Province of Canada by the merger of Upper Canada and Lower Canada.

Cornwall was represented by one member in the Legislative Assembly. It was abolished in 1867, upon the creation of Canada and the province of Ontario.

== Boundaries ==
Cornwall electoral district was based largely on the municipal boundaries of the town of Cornwall, on the north shore of the Saint Lawrence River. It was located in Canada West (now the province of Ontario), close to the boundary with Canada East (now the province of Quebec).

The Union Act, 1840 had merged the two provinces of Upper Canada and Lower Canada into the Province of Canada, with a single Parliament. The separate parliaments of Upper Canada and Lower Canada were abolished. The Union Act provided that the town of Cornwall would constitute one electoral district in the Legislative Assembly of the new Parliament, but gave the Governor General of the Province of Canada the power to draw the boundaries for the electoral district.

The first Governor General of the Province of Canada, Lord Sydenham, issued a proclamation shortly after the formation of the Province of Canada in early 1841, establishing the boundaries for the electoral district:

The Town of Cornwall shall be bounded and limited as follows :—commencing at the south-west angle of the said Town, in the western limit of Cumberland-street, on the River Saint Lawrence; then north, sixteen degrees west, ninety-two chains, more or less, to the northern limit of Ninth-street; then north, seventy-four degrees east, eighty chains, more or less, to the eastern limit of Marlborough-street; then south sixteen degrees east, one hundred and six chains, more or less, to the said River Saint Lawrence; then westerly along the waters of the said Saint Lawrence, to the place of beginning.

== Members of the Legislative Assembly ==
Cornwall was represented by one member in the Legislative Assembly. The following were the members for Cornwall.

Parliament	Years	Member	Party
1st Parliament; 1841–1844	1841–1844	Solomon Yeomans Chesley	Unionist; Compact Tory

== Abolition ==
The district was abolished on July 1, 1867, when the British North America Act, 1867 came into force, creating Canada and splitting the Province of Canada into Quebec and Ontario. It was succeeded by electoral districts of the same name in the House of Commons of Canada and the Legislative Assembly of Ontario.
