= Charles-François Fournier =

Charles-François Fournier (May 15, 1805 – in or after 1863) was a land surveyor and political figure in Canada East. He represented L'Islet in the Legislative Assembly of the Province of Canada from 1847 to 1863.

He was born in Saint-Jean-Port-Joli, the son of François Fournier and Catherine Miville-Deschênes. Fournier received his commission as a land surveyor in 1826. He was also a lieutenant colonel in the local militia and a justice of the peace. He was married to Mary Jane Brotherton. Fournier was first elected to the assembly in a by-election held in May 1847. He was defeated by Louis-Bonaventure Caron when he ran for reelection in 1858 but was declared elected later that same year. He was defeated when he ran for reelection in 1863.
