= List of by-elections in the Province of Canada =

The list of by-elections in the Province of Canada includes every by-election held in the Province of Canada from its creation in 1841 until Confederation in 1867. By-elections occurred whenever there was a vacancy in the Legislative Assembly. The Legislative Council was made an elective body in 1856 and by-elections occurred there as well. Due to the fluid nature of party allegiances during this time no attempt has been made to show them in this list.

== Causes ==
A by-election occurs whenever there was a vacancy in the legislature. Vacancies occurred for the following reasons:

- Death of a member.
- Resignation of a member.
- Voided results
- Expulsion from the legislature.
- Ineligibility to sit.
- Appointment to the Legislative Council, the appointed upper house, which was made elective in 1856.
- Ministerial by-elections occurred when incumbent members recontested their seats upon being appointed to the Executive Council. In 1853 this requirement was amended to exempt Executive Councillors who resigned their offices and within a month accepted a new office. Solicitors General were not exempted if they switched to the Attorney Generalship. In 1855 this exception was dropped. In 1857 this requirement was extended to include Legislative Councillors.

== 8th Parliament of the Province of Canada 1863–1867 ==
By-election	Date	Incumbent	Winner	Cause
Oxford North	July 14, 1866	Hope Fleming Mackenzie	Thomas Oliver	Death
Wentworth North	November 1, 1865	William Notman	James McMonies	Death
Hamilton	February 21, 1865	Isaac Buchanan	Charles Magill	Resignation
Ontario South	January 18, 1865	Oliver Mowat	Thomas Nicholson Gibbs	Appointed a judge
Trois-Rivières	January 16, 1865	Joseph-Édouard Turcotte	Louis-Charles Boucher de Niverville	Death
Chicoutimi and Saguenay	January 3, 1865	David Edward Price	Pierre-Alexis Tremblay	Resignation to run for the Legislative Council
York West	December 14, 1864	William Pearce Howland	William Pearce Howland	Sought re-election upon appointment as Postmaster General
Lanark North	November 4, 1864	Robert Bell	William McDougall	Resignation to provide a seat for McDougall
Peterborough	September 14, 1864	Wilson Seymour Conger	Frederick W. Haultain	Death
Niagara	September 7, 1864	John Simpson	Angus Morrison	Appointed Assistant Auditor of Public Accounts
Jacques-Cartier	August 26, 1864	François-Zéphirin Tassé	Guillaume Gamelin Gaucher	Appointed Inspector of Prisons
Ontario North	July 30, 1864	William McDougall	Matthew Crooks Cameron	Sought re-election upon appointment as Provincial Secretary and Registrar
Ontario South	July 18, 1864	Oliver Mowat	Oliver Mowat	Sought re-election upon appointment as Postmaster General
Oxford South	July 11, 1864	George Brown	George Brown	Sought re-election upon appointment as President of the Executive Council
Hamilton	April 29, 1864	Isaac Buchanan	Isaac Buchanan	Sought re-election upon appointment as President of the Executive Council
Waterloo North	April 26, 1864	Michael Hamilton Foley	Isaac Erb Bowman	Sought re-election upon appointment as Postmaster General
Northumberland West	April 23, 1864	James Cockburn	James Cockburn	Sought re-election upon appointment as Solicitor General for Upper Canada
Kamouraska	April 14, 1864	Jean-Charles Chapais	Jean-Charles Chapais	Sought re-election upon appointment as Commissioner of Public Works
Sherbrooke	April 11, 1864	Alexander Tilloch Galt	Alexander Tilloch Galt	Sought re-election upon appointment as Minister of Finance
Niagara	April 11, 1864	John Simpson	John Simpson	Sought re-election upon appointment as Provincial Secretary and Registrar
Montreal West	April 11, 1864	Thomas D'Arcy McGee	Thomas D'Arcy McGee	Sought re-election upon appointment as Minister of Agriculture
Montreal East	April 11, 1864	George-Étienne Cartier	George-Étienne Cartier	Sought re-election upon appointment as Attorney General for Lower Canada
Kingston	April 11, 1864	John A. Macdonald	John A. Macdonald	Sought re-election upon appointment as Attorney General for Upper Canada
Dorchester	April 11, 1864	Hector-Louis Langevin	Hector-Louis Langevin	Sought re-election upon appointment as Solicitor General for Lower Canada
Leeds South	January 30, 1864	Albert Norton Richards	David Ford Jones	Sought re-election upon appointment as Solicitor General for Upper Canada
St. Hyacinthe	October 1, 1863	Louis-Victor Sicotte	Rémi Raymond	Appointed a judge
Bagot	August 15, 1863	Maurice Laframboise	Maurice Laframboise	Sought re-election upon appointment as Commissioner of Public Works

== 7th Parliament of the Province of Canada 1861–1863 ==
By-election	Date	Incumbent	Winner	Cause
Essex	April 7, 1863	Arthur Rankin	John O'Connor	Void Election
Laprairie	April 1, 1863	Thomas-Jean-Jacques Loranger	Alfred Pinsonneault	Appointed a judge
Oxford South	March 19, 1863	George Skeffington Connor	George Brown	Appointed a judge
Napierville	November 17, 1862	Jacques-Olivier Bureau	Pierre Benoît	Resignation to run for the Legislative Council
Perth	July 3, 1862	Michael Hamilton Foley	Thomas Mayne Daly	Elected in two seats and re-elected at ministerial by-election in Waterloo North
Hochelaga	June 20, 1862	Paschal Falkner	Antoine-Aimé Dorion	Resignation to provide a seat for Dorion
Oxford North	June 14, 1862	William McDougall	William McDougall	Sought re-election upon appointment as Commissioner of Crown Lands
Cornwall	June 14, 1862	John Sandfield Macdonald	John Sandfield Macdonald	Sought re-election upon appointment as Attorney General for Upper Canada
York North	June 13, 1862	Adam Wilson	Adam Wilson	Sought re-election upon appointment as Solicitor General for Upper Canada
York West	June 12, 1862	William Pearce Howland	William Pearce Howland	Sought re-election upon appointment as Minister of Finance
St. Hyacinthe	June 12, 1862	Louis-Victor Sicotte	Louis-Victor Sicotte	Sought re-election upon appointment as Attorney General for Lower Canada
Argenteuil	June 12, 1862	John Abbott	John Abbott	Sought re-election upon appointment as Solicitor General for Lower Canada
Waterloo North	June 9, 1862	Michael Hamilton Foley	Michael Hamilton Foley	Sought re-election upon appointment as Postmaster General
Quebec County	June 9, 1862	François Évanturel	François Évanturel	Sought re-election upon appointment as Minister of Agriculture
Montreal West	June 5, 1862	Thomas D'Arcy McGee	Thomas D'Arcy McGee	Sought re-election upon appointment as President of the Executive Council
Toronto West	April 22, 1862	John Beverley Robinson	John Beverley Robinson	Sought re-election upon appointment as President of the Executive Council
London	April 7, 1862	John Carling	John Carling	Sought re-election upon appointment as Receiver General
Brome	March 17, 1862	Moses Sweet	Christopher Dunkin	Appointed Postmaster of Warden
Montcalm	February 20, 1862	Jean-Louis Martin	Joseph Dufresne	Death
Laval	September 27, 1861	Pierre Labelle	Louis-Siméon Morin	Appointed Inspector of Public Works

== 6th Parliament of the Province of Canada 1858–1861 ==
By-election	Date	Incumbent	Winner	Cause
Grey	March 4, 1861	John Sheridan Hogan	Jesse Thomas Purdy	Death
Vaudreuil	November 26, 1860	Robert Unwin Harwood	Jean-Baptiste Mongenais	Resignation to run for the Legislative Council
Shefford	November 20, 1860	Asa Belknap Foster	Vacant, no return made due to tie between Lucius Seth Huntington and Michel-Adrien Bessette. Assembly dissolved before the results could be decided.	Resignation to run for the Legislative Council
Lambton	November 19, 1860	Malcolm Cameron	Hope Fleming Mackenzie	Resignation to run for the Legislative Council
Lincoln	November 7, 1860	William Hamilton Merritt	John Charles Rykert	Resignation to run for the Legislative Council
Lanark North	October 26, 1860	Robert Bell	Robert Bell	Resignation to run for the Legislative Council
Middlesex East	May 31, 1860	Marcus Talbot	Robert Craik	Death
Quebec East*	May 18, 1860	Hippolyte Dubord	Pierre-Gabriel Huot	Void Election
Quebec West*	May 7, 1860	Charles Joseph Alleyn	Charles Joseph Alleyn	Void Election
Quebec Centre*	May 7, 1860	Georges-Honoré Simard	Georges-Honoré Simard	Void Election
Terrebonne	February 21, 1860	Louis-Siméon Morin	Louis-Siméon Morin	Sought re-election upon appointment as Solicitor General for Lower Canada
York North	January 14, 1860	Joseph Hartman	Adam Wilson	Death
Russell	December 21, 1859	G. B. Lyon-Fellowes	John Loux	Resignation due to election fraud
Wellington North	February 23, 1859	Charles Allan	James Ross	Death
Maskinongé	December 14, 1858	Louis-Honoré Gauvreau	George Caron	Death
Brant East	December 1, 1858	David Christie	Hugh Finlayson	Resignation to run for the Legislative Council
Haldimand	October 7, 1858	William Lyon Mackenzie	Michael Harcourt	Resignation
Lotbinière	October 2, 1858	John O'Farrell	Lewis Thomas Drummond	Void Election
Shefford	September 14, 1858	Lewis Thomas Drummond	Asa Belknap Foster	Sought re-election upon appointment as Attorney General for Lower Canada**
Portneuf	September 11, 1858	Joseph-Élie Thibaudeau	Joseph-Élie Thibaudeau	Sought re-election upon appointment as President of the Executive Council and Minister of Agriculture**
Montreal	September 9, 1858	Antoine-Aimé Dorion	Antoine-Aimé Dorion	Sought re-election upon appointment as Commissioner of Crown Lands**
Oxford South	September 7, 1858	George Skeffington Connor	George Skeffington Connor	Sought re-election upon appointment as Solicitor General for Upper Canada**
Iberville	September 6, 1858	Charles Laberge	Charles Laberge	Sought re-election upon appointment as Solicitor General for Lower Canada**
Ontario South	September 4, 1858	Oliver Mowat	Oliver Mowat	Sought re-election upon appointment as Provincial Secretary and Registrar**
Brockville	September 2, 1858	George Sherwood	George Sherwood	Sought re-election upon appointment as Receiver General
Toronto	September 1, 1858	George Brown	George Brown	Sought re-election upon appointment as Inspector General**
Cornwall	September 1, 1858	John Sandfield Macdonald	John Sandfield Macdonald	Sought re-election upon appointment as Attorney General for Upper Canada**
Lévis	August 28, 1858	François-Xavier Lemieux	François-Xavier Lemieux	Sought re-election upon appointment as Receiver General**
Waterloo North	August 23, 1858	Michael Hamilton Foley	Michael Hamilton Foley	Sought re-election upon appointment as Postmaster General**
Sherbrooke	August 23, 1858	Alexander Tilloch Galt	Alexander Tilloch Galt	Sought re-election upon appointment as Inspector General
Wellington North	August 21, 1858	Charles Allan	Charles Allan	Void Election
Middlesex West	August 5, 1858	John Scatcherd	Angus Peter McDonald	Death
Leeds North and Grenville North	May 21, 1858	Basil R. Church	Ogle Robert Gowan	Death
Oxford North	May 14, 1858	George Brown	William McDougall	Chose to sit for Toronto
Renfrew	March 3, 1858	John Lorn McDougall	William Cayley	Appointed Associate Coroner for the United Counties of Lanark and Renfrew
Northumberland West	February 22, 1858	Sidney Smith	Sidney Smith	Sought re-election upon appointment as Postmaster General

* Incumbents sat for Quebec City which was a three-member seat until 1860 when it was split into Centre, East and West districts. As a result, the by-elections were held for the new single-member seats

** Members of the Brown-Dorion Ministry of August 2–4, 1858

== 5th Parliament of the Province of Canada 1854–1857 ==
By-election	Date	Incumbent	Winner	Cause
Terrebonne	June 23, 1857	Gédéon-Mélasippe Prévost	Louis-Siméon Morin	Resignation to provide a seat for Morin
Quebec City	April 14, 1857	Jean Blanchet	George Okill Stuart	Resignation (ill health)
Rimouski	February 17, 1857	Joseph-Charles Taché	Michel Guillaume Baby	Resignation
Quebec City	October 27, 1856	Jean Chabot	Georges-Honoré Simard	Appointed a judge
Hastings North	October 27, 1856	Edmund Murney	George Benjamin	Resignation to run for the Legislative Council
Rouville	October 4, 1856	Joseph-Napoléon Poulin	William Henry Chaffers	Resignation to run for the Legislative Council
Niagara	June 20, 1856	Joseph Curran Morrison	Joseph Curran Morrison	Sought re-election upon appointment as Receiver General
Stanstead	June 10, 1856	Timothy Lee Terrill	Timothy Lee Terrill	Sought re-election upon appointment as Provincial Secretary and Registrar
Argenteuil	May 12, 1856	Sydney Robert Bellingham	Sydney Robert Bellingham	Void Election
Renfrew	March 31, 1856	Francis Hincks	John Supple	Resignation
Peterborough	January 26, 1856	John Langton	Wilson Seymour Conger	Appointed Auditor of Public Accounts
Quebec County	August 7, 1855	Pierre-Joseph-Olivier Chauveau	François Évanturel	Appointed Superintendent of the Board of Education
Chicoutimi and Tadoussac	April 26, 1855	Augustin-Norbert Morin	David Edward Price	Appointed a judge
Verchères	February 26, 1855	George-Étienne Cartier	George-Étienne Cartier	Sought re-election upon appointment as Provincial Secretary and Registrar
Montmorency	February 12, 1855	Joseph-Édouard Cauchon	Joseph-Édouard Cauchon	Sought re-election upon appointment as Commissioner of Crown Lands
Lévis	February 10, 1855	François-Xavier Lemieux	François-Xavier Lemieux	Sought re-election upon appointment as Chief Commissioner of Public Works
Kamouraska	January 30, 1855	Jean-Charles Chapais	Jean-Charles Chapais	Void Election
Saguenay	January 18, 1855	Pierre-Gabriel Huot	Pierre-Gabriel Huot	Void Election
Argenteuil	January 5, 1855	Sydney Robert Bellingham	Sydney Robert Bellingham	Void Election
Bagot	October 20, 1854	Timothée Brodeur	Timothée Brodeur	Void Election
Bellechasse	October 17, 1854	Jean Chabot	Octave-Cyrille Fortier	Chose to sit for Quebec City
Wentworth North	October 13, 1854	Robert Spence	Robert Spence	Sought re-election upon appointment as Postmaster General
Oxford South	October 9, 1854	Francis Hincks	Ephraim Cook	Chose to sit for Renfrew
Huron-Bruce	October 4, 1854	William Cayley	William Cayley	Sought re-election upon appointment as Inspector General
Hamilton	October 2, 1854	Allan MacNab	Allan MacNab	Sought re-election upon appointment as President of the Executive Council and Minister of Agriculture
Kingston	September 28, 1854	John A. Macdonald	John A. Macdonald	Sought re-election upon appointment as Attorney General of Upper Canada
Frontenac	September 28, 1854	Henry Smith	Henry Smith	Sought re-election upon appointment as Solicitor General of Upper Canada

== 4th Parliament of the Province of Canada 1851–1854 ==
By-election	Date	Incumbent	Winner	Cause
Leeds	July 30, 1853	William Buell Richards	Jesse Delong	Appointed a judge
Niagara	July 13, 1853	Joseph Curran Morrison	Joseph Curran Morrison	Sought re-election upon appointment as Solicitor General of Upper Canada
Toronto	April 28, 1853	William Henry Boulton	Henry Sherwood	Void Election
Sherbrooke City	March 8, 1853	Edward Short	Alexander Tilloch Galt	Appointed a judge
Stanstead	November 23, 1852	Hazard Bailey Terrill	Timothy Lee Terrill	Death
Bellechasse	October 4, 1852	Jean Chabot	Jean Chabot	Sought re-election upon appointment as Chief Commissioner of Public Works
Niagara	September 25, 1852	Francis Hincks	Joseph Curran Morrison	Chose to sit for Oxford
Deux-Montagnes	July 9, 1852	William Henry Scott	Louis-Joseph Papineau	Death
Huron	May 12, 1852	Malcolm Cameron	Malcolm Cameron	Sought re-election upon accepting appointment as President of the Executive Council

== 3rd Parliament of the Province of Canada 1848–1851 ==
By-election	Date	Incumbent	Winner	Cause
Haldimand	April 21, 1851	David Thompson	William Lyon Mackenzie	Death
Kamouraska	February 1, 1851	Pierre Canac	Luc Letellier de St-Just	Death
Lincoln	May 4, 1850	William Hamilton Merritt	William Hamilton Merritt	Sought re-election upon appointment as Chief Commissioner of Public Works
Mégantic	May 1, 1850	Dominick Daly	Dunbar Ross	Appointed to a Commission Inquiring into the Condition and Claims of the New and Waltham forests
Halton	March 18, 1850	John Wetenhall	Calen Hopkins	Sought re-election upon appointment as Assistant Commissioner of Public Works
Sherbrooke County	March 9, 1850	Alexander Tilloch Galt	John Sewell Sanborn	Resignation
Quebec City	January 29, 1850	Jean Chabot	Jean Chabot	Sought re-election upon appointment as Chief Commissioner of Public Works
London	January 21, 1850	John Wilson	John Wilson	Sought re-election in opposition to the Montreal Annexation Manifesto
Glengarry	January 11, 1850	John Sandfield Macdonald	John Sandfield Macdonald	Sought re-election upon appointment as Solicitor General for Upper Canada
York East	December 4, 1849	William Hume Blake	Peter Perry	Appointed a judge
Chambly	September 25, 1849	Pierre Beaubien	Louis Lacoste	Appointed Medical Superintendent at the Montreal prison
Sherbrooke County	April 17, 1849	Samuel Brooks	Alexander Tilloch Galt	Death
Lincoln	October 6, 1848	William Hamilton Merritt	William Hamilton Merritt	Sought re-election upon appointment as President of the Executive Council
Saguenay	September 5, 1848	Marc-Pascal de Sales Laterrière	Marc-Pascal de Sales Laterrière	Vacated seat on appointment as Deputy Adjutant-General of the Militia. Re-elected after resigning office.
Shefford	July 11, 1848	Lewis Thomas Drummond	Lewis Thomas Drummond	Sought re-election upon appointment as Solicitor General for Lower Canada
York East	July 5, 1848	William Hume Blake	William Hume Blake	Sought re-election upon appointment as Solicitor General for Upper Canada
Quebec City	June 9, 1848	Thomas Cushing Aylwin	François-Xavier Méthot	Appointed a judge
Oxford	April 28, 1848	Francis Hincks	Francis Hincks	Sought re-election upon appointment as Inspector General
Trois-Rivières	April 26, 1848	Vacant	Antoine Polette	No return made at general election
Terrebonne	April 14, 1848	Louis-Hippolyte Lafontaine	Louis-Michel Viger	Elected in two seats and re-elected in ministerial by-election for Montreal City
Kent	April 10, 1848	Malcolm Cameron	Malcolm Cameron	Sought re-election upon appointment as Assistant Commissioner of Public Works
Verchères	April 7, 1848	James Leslie	George-Étienne Cartier	Vacated seat on appointment as President of the Executive Council and was later appointed to the Legislative Council
York North	April 1, 1848	Robert Baldwin	Robert Baldwin	Sought re-election upon appointment as Attorney General for Upper Canada
York South	March 31, 1848	James Hervey Price	James Hervey Price	Sought re-election upon appointment as Commissioner of Crown Lands
Quebec City	March 28, 1848	Thomas Cushing Aylwin	Thomas Cushing Aylwin	Sought re-election upon appointment as Solicitor General for Lower Canada
Montreal City	March 28, 1848	Louis-Hippolyte Lafontaine	Louis-Hippolyte Lafontaine	Sought re-election upon appointment as Attorney General for Lower Canada

== 2nd Parliament of the Province of Canada 1844–1847 ==
By-election	Date	Incumbent	Winner	Cause
Dorchester	July 12, 1847	Joseph-André Taschereau	François-Xavier Lemieux	Appointed a judge
London	July 3, 1847	William Henry Draper	John Wilson	Appointed a judge
Toronto	June 10, 1847	Henry Sherwood	Henry Sherwood	Sought re-election upon appointment as Attorney General for Upper Canada
Missisquoi	June 10, 1847	James Smith	William Badgley	Appointed a judge
Kingston	June 1, 1847	John A. Macdonald	John A. Macdonald	Sought re-election upon appointment as Receiver General
L'Islet	May 6, 1847	Étienne-Paschal Taché	Charles-François Fournier	Appointed Deputy Adjutant-General of the Militia
Cornwall	August 17, 1846	Rolland Macdonald	John Hillyard Cameron	Resignation to provide a seat for Cameron
Simcoe	July 27, 1846	William Benjamin Robinson	William Benjamin Robinson	Sought re-election upon appointment as Chief Commissioner of Public Works
Prince Edward	July 1, 1846	John Philip Roblin	Roger B. Conger	Appointed Collector of Customs
Carleton	June 23, 1846	James Johnston	George Lyon	Sought re-election in opposition to the Ministry
Huron	February 28, 1846	William Dunlop	William Cayley	Appointed Superintendent of the Lachine Canal
Dorchester	September 15, 1845	Pierre-Elzéar Taschereau	Joseph-André Taschereau	Death
Trois-Rivières	July 14, 1845	Edward Greive	Denis-Benjamin Viger	Death
Lanark	February 28, 1845	Malcolm Cameron	Malcolm Cameron	Void Election
London	February 13, 1845	Lawrence Lawrason	William Henry Draper	Resignation to provide a seat for Draper
Kent	February 7, 1845	Samuel Harrison	Joseph Woods	Appointed a judge
Saguenay	January 14, 1845	Augustin-Norbert Morin	Marc-Pascal de Sales Laterrière	Chose to sit for Bellechasse
Simcoe	January 13, 1845	William Benjamin Robinson	William Benjamin Robinson	Sought re-election upon appointment as Inspector General

== 1st Parliament of the Province of Canada 1841–1844 ==
By-election	Date	Incumbent	Winner	Cause
Montreal City	April 17, 1844	Benjamin Holmes	Lewis Thomas Drummond	Resignation
London	January 1844	Hamilton Hartley Killaly	Lawrence Lawrason	Resignation due to his office becoming ineligible with membership of the Legislature
Montreal City	November 22, 1843	George Moffatt	Pierre Beaubien	Resignation in protest of moving the capital from Kingston to Montreal
Hastings	November 4, 1843	Vacant	Edmund Murney	No by-election held in 1842 due to riots
Montreal County	October 26, 1843	Alexandre-Maurice Delisle	André Jobin	Appointed Clerk of the Crown
Chambly	October 23, 1843	John Yule	Louis Lacoste	Resignation
Rouville	September 25, 1843	William Walker	Timothée Franchère	Resignation
Champlain	September 22, 1843	René-Joseph Kimber	Henry Judah	Appointed to the Legislative Council
Quebec City	September 18, 1843	David Burnet	Jean Chabot	Resignation (became bankrupt)
Russell	September 14, 1843	William Henry Draper	William Stewart	Appointed to the Legislative Council
Toronto	March 6, 1843	Isaac Buchanan	Henry Sherwood	Resignation
Rimouski	January 30, 1843	Michel Borne	Robert Baldwin	Resignation to provide a seat for Baldwin
Saguenay	November 28, 1842	Étienne Parent	Augustin-Norbert Morin	Appointed Clerk of the Executive Council
2nd Riding of York	November 22, 1842	George Duggan	George Duggan	Void Election
Beauharnois	November 9, 1842	John William Dunscomb	Edward Gibbon Wakefield	Appointed Warden of Trinity House
Portneuf	October 20, 1842	Thomas Cushing Aylwin	Thomas Cushing Aylwin	Sought re-election upon appointment as Solicitor General for Lower Canada
Hastings	October 17, 1842	Robert Baldwin	No Return due to riots	Sought re-election upon appointment as Attorney General for Upper Canada
3rd Riding of York	October 15, 1842	James Edward Small	James Edward Small	Sought re-election upon appointment as Solicitor General for Upper Canada
4th Riding of York	October 8, 1842	Louis Hippolyte LaFontaine	Louis Hippolyte LaFontaine	Sought re-election upon appointment as Attorney General for Lower Canada
London	September 28, 1842	Hamilton Hartley Killaly	Hamilton Hartley Killaly	Sought re-election upon appointment as Chairman of the Board of Works
Ottawa County	August 17, 1842	Charles Dewey Day	Denis-Benjamin Papineau	Appointed a judge
Leinster	August 8, 1842	Jean-Moïse Raymond	Jacob De Witt	Appointed registrar
Saint-Maurice	July 8, 1842	Joseph-Édouard Turcotte	Joseph-Édouard Turcotte	Sought re-election due to holding two government offices
Rouville	July 7, 1842	Melchior-Alphonse d'Irumberry de Salaberry	William Walker	Appointed registrar
Oxford	July 6, 1842	Francis Hincks	Francis Hincks	Sought re-election upon appointment as Inspector General
Bellechasse	June 6, 1842	Augustin-Guillaume Ruel	Abraham Turgeon	Appointed registrar
Deux Montagnes	April 18, 1842	Colin Robertson	Charles John Forbes	Death
Nicolet	February 15, 1842	Augustin-Norbert Morin	Louis-Michel Viger	Resignation to be appointed a judge
Verchères	December 28, 1841	Henri Desrivières	James Leslie	Resignation to provide a seat for Leslie
4th Riding of York	September 21, 1841	Robert Baldwin	Louis Hippolyte LaFontaine	Chose to sit for Hastings
Middlesex	July 10, 1841	Thomas Parke	Thomas Parke	Sought re-election upon appointment as Surveyor General
Kingston	July 1, 1841	Anthony Manahan	Samuel Harrison	Appointed Collector of Customs for Toronto

== Legislative Council By-Elections 1856–1867 ==
The Legislative Council became an elective body in 1856. By-elections were held to fill vacancies. In 1857 Legislative Councillors appointed to office were now required to seek re-election at Ministerial by-elections.

By-election	Date	Incumbent	Winner	Cause
Brock	January 25, 1866	Adam Johnston Fergusson Blair	Adam Johnston Fergusson Blair	Sought re-election upon appointment as President of the Executive Council
Stadacona	September 19, 1864	François Baby	Jean-Élie Gingras	Death
La Durantaye	June 25, 1864	François-Xavier Lemieux	Joseph-Noël Bossé	Death
Cataraqui	April 30, 1864	Alexander Campbell	Alexander Campbell	Sought re-election upon appointment as Commissioner of Crown Lands
Rougemont	January 8, 1864	Louis-Antoine Dessaulles	William Henry Chaffers	Appointed Clerk of the Crown and Peace
St. Clair	September 19, 1863	John Wilson	Alexander Vidal	Appointed a judge
Newcastle	September 17, 1863	Andrew Jeffrey	Asa Burnham	Death
Trent	July 21, 1863	Sidney Smith	Billa Flint	Resignation to contest the 1863 general election
Victoria	June 19, 1863	Luther Hamilton Holton	Thomas Ryan	Vacated seat on appointment as Minister of Finance and contested the 1863 general election
Grandville	June 5, 1863	Luc Letellier de St-Just	Luc Letellier de St-Just	Sought re-election upon appointment as Minister of Agriculture
Rigaud	June 3, 1863	Robert Unwin Harwood	Eustache Prud'homme	Death
St. Clair	May 16, 1863	Malcolm Cameron	John Wilson	Appointed Queen's Printer
Wellington	May 8, 1863	Hollis Smith	John Sewell Sanborn	Death
De Lanaudière	April 6, 1863	Alexandre Bareil, dit Lajoie	Louis Auguste Olivier	Death
Brock	March 28, 1863	Adam Johnston Fergusson Blair	Adam Johnston Fergusson Blair	Sought re-election upon appointment as Receiver General
De Lorimier	February 26, 1863	Jacques-Olivier Bureau	Jacques-Olivier Bureau	Sought re-election upon appointment as Provincial Secretary and Registrar
Western	September 18, 1862	Allan MacNab	Walter McCrea	Death
Niagara	September 4, 1862	William Hamilton Merritt	James Currie	Death
Gulf	June 23, 1862	Ulric-Joseph Tessier	Ulric-Joseph Tessier	Sought re-election upon appointment as Commissioner of Public Works
Saugeen	May 9, 1862	James Patton	John McMurrich	Sought re-election upon appointment as Solicitor General for Upper Canada
Rideau	April 21, 1862	Philip Michael Matthew Scott VanKoughnet	James Skead	Appointed a judge
Trent	September 28, 1861	Edmund Murney	Sidney Smith	Death
Stadacona	June 17, 1861	Pierre-Gabriel Huot	François Baby	Void Election
Montarville	June 17, 1861	Alexandre-Édouard Kierzkowski	Louis Lacoste	Void Election
Western	November 24, 1860	John Prince	Allan MacNab	Appointed a judge
Sorel	June 18, 1860	Jean-Baptiste Guèvremont	Jean-Baptiste Guèvremont	Void Election

== See also ==
- List of Joint Premiers of the Province of Canada
- List of elections in the Province of Canada
- List of Canadian federal general elections
- List of Ontario general elections
- List of Quebec general elections
- Legislative Assembly of the Province of Canada
