= Malcolm Cameron (Canadian politician) =

Canadian politician and businessman

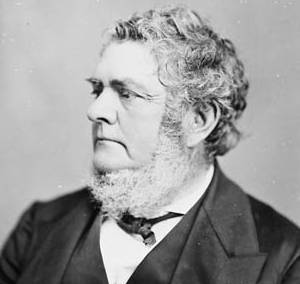

Member of the Legislative Assembly of Upper Canada for Lanark County
- In office 1836–1840
- Monarch: Victoria
- Lieutenant Governor: Sir John Colborne (1828–1836); Sir Francis Bond Head (1836–1838); Sir George Arthur (1838–1839)

Member of the Legislative Assembly of the Province of Canada for Lanark
- In office 1841–1847
- Governors General: Lord Sydenham (1841); Sir Charles Bagot (1842–1843); Sir Charles Metcalfe (1843–1845)
- Preceded by: New position
- Succeeded by: Robert Bell

Member of Parliament for Ontario South
- In office January 22, 1874 – June 1, 1876
- Preceded by: Thomas Nicholson Gibbs
- Succeeded by: Thomas Nicholson Gibbs

Personal details
- Born: April 25, 1808 Trois-Rivières, Lower Canada
- Died: June 1, 1876 (aged 68) Ottawa, Canada
- Party: Reform
- Occupation: Businessman

Malcolm Cameron (April 25, 1808 – June 1, 1876) was a Canadian businessman and politician.

== Early life ==
He was born at Trois-Rivières in Lower Canada in 1808 and grew up in Lanark County in Upper Canada. At the age of 15, he found work in the Montreal area, but later returned to Perth to complete his schooling.

== Business career ==
In 1828, Cameron became a merchant in the Perth area. The year before, he had set up a general store at Port Sarnia (later Sarnia) and, in 1837, he moved there. In the same year, he served with Allan Napier MacNab during the Upper Canada Rebellion. He also set up mills in the Port Sarnia area, became involved in transporting goods and established a business cutting and selling timber.

== Political career ==
In 1836, he was elected to the 13th Parliament of Upper Canada representing Lanark County as a moderate Reformer. Upon the formation of the Province of Canada by the union of Lower Canada and Upper Canada, he was elected to the first Parliament of the Province of Canada, again representing Lanark. He originally opposed Robert Baldwin, he supported his government in 1842 and was given the post of inspector of revenue. He resigned in 1843 because he could not support the government bill that moved the capital to Montreal. He continued to represent Lanark in the Legislative Assembly until 1847.

In 1847, he was elected in Kent and, in 1848, was chosen to be assistant commissioner of public works, resigning in 1849. Cameron began to align himself with the Clear Grits. He pressed for the abolition of the clergy reserves and pushed for reciprocity in trade with the United States. In 1851, he was elected as an independent in Huron. He also supported Arthur Rankin in Kent against George Brown in a bitter campaign, although Brown won easily. He was given a post in the government in 1852 and, in 1853, became appointed Postmaster General. This also meant that he served on the Board of Railway Commissioners and he represented the government on the board of the Grand Trunk Railway. In 1854, Cameron ran in both South Lanark and Lambton, but was elected in neither.

He was elected to the 6th Parliament of the Province of Canada as an independent representing Lambton; he defeated the Reform candidate Hope Fleming Mackenzie, the brother of Alexander Mackenzie. In 1860, he was elected to the Legislative Council for St. Clair division and Hope Mackenzie won the Lambton seat in a by-election.

In 1863, he was appointed Queen's Printer with George-Paschal Desbarats, and served until 1869.

In 1874, he was elected to the 3rd Canadian Parliament as a Liberal candidate in the riding of Ontario South. He died at Ottawa while in office in 1876.

Malcolm Colin Cameron, whom he is believed to have adopted, became a Member of Parliament for Huron South and Huron West.

Cameron Township in Quebec was named in his honour (since 1980 part of Bouchette, Quebec).

== Electoral record ==
1872 Canadian federal election: Russell
Party	Candidate	Votes
Conservative	James Grant	1,217
Liberal	Malcolm Cameron	952
Source: Canadian Elections Database

Legislative Assembly of the Province of Canada
New assembly	Member of the Legislative Assembly for Lanark; 1841-1847	Succeeded by Robert Bell
Preceded by Joseph Woods	Member of the Legislative Assembly for Kent; 1847-1848	Succeeded by George Brown
Preceded by William Cayley	Member of the Legislative Assembly for Huron; 1851-1854	Succeeded by William Cayley
Preceded by George Brown	Member of the Legislative Assembly for Lambton; 1858-1860	Succeeded by Hope Fleming Mackenzie
Parliament of Canada
Preceded by Thomas Nicholson Gibbs	Member of Parliament for Ontario South; 1874-1876	Succeeded by Thomas Nicholson Gibbs
