= London (Province of Canada electoral district) =

Electoral district, Legislative Assembly, Province of Canada

London Canada West
Province of Canada electoral district

Defunct pre-Confederation electoral district
- Legislature: Legislative Assembly of the Province of Canada
- District created: 1841
- District abolished: 1867
- First contested: 1841
- Last contested: 1863

London was an electoral district of the Legislative Assembly of the Parliament of the Province of Canada, in Canada West (now Ontario). It was created in 1851, upon the establishment of the Province of Canada by the union of Upper Canada and Lower Canada. London was represented by one member in the Legislative Assembly. It was abolished in 1867, upon the creation of Canada and the province of Ontario.

== Boundaries ==
London electoral district was based primarily on the boundaries of the town of London, on the Ontario Peninsula. The town of London was the major centre of the electoral district.

The Union Act, 1840 had merged the two provinces of Upper Canada and Lower Canada into the Province of Canada, with a single Parliament. The separate parliaments of Lower Canada and Upper Canada were abolished. The Union Act provided that the town of London would constitute one electoral district in the Legislative Assembly of the new Parliament, but gave the Governor General of the Province of Canada the power to draw the boundaries for the electoral district.

The first Governor General, Lord Sydenham, issued a proclamation shortly after the formation of the Province of Canada in early 1841, establishing the boundaries for the electoral district:

The Town of London shall be bounded and limited as follows :—commencing on the north branch of the River Thames, between the second and third concessions of the Township of London, at the north-west angle of the said Town of London; then, north, sixty-eight degrees, thirty minutes east, one hundred and fifty chains, more or less, to the limit between lots numbers eleven and twelve of said Township; then south, twenty-one degrees, thirty minutes east, two hundred and eleven chains, more or less, to the River Thames; then westerly and northerly along the said River, to the forks, near Dundas street, forming the north branch of the said River; then along the waters of the said north branch, in a northerly direction, to the place of beginning.

== Members of the Legislative Assembly ==
London was represented by one member in the Legislative Assembly. The following were the members for London.

Parliament	Years	Members	Party
1st Parliament; 1841–1844	1841	Hamilton Hartley Killaly (Note: Killaly was elected in the general election of 1841. In December 1841, he was appointed the Chair of the Board of Works. Since that was an office of profit, he was required to resign his seat and seek re-election. He was re-elected in a by-election in September, 1842. He resigned his seat on November 30, 1843.)	Unionist; moderate Reformer
1st Parliament; 1841–1844	1842–1843	Hamilton Hartley Killaly	Unionist; moderate Reformer

== Abolition ==
The electoral district was abolished on July 1, 1867, when the British North America Act, 1867 came into force, creating Canada and splitting the Province of Canada into Quebec and Ontario. It was succeeded by the electoral districts of London in both the House of Commons of Canada and the Legislative Assembly of Ontario.
