= List of elections in the Province of Canada =

General elections were held in the Province of Canada eight times between 1841 and 1863 for the purpose of electing members to the lower house of its legislature, the Legislative Assembly of the Province of Canada, a British colony that existed between 1841 and 1867. Furthermore, between 1856 and 1864, elections were held every two years for the purpose of electing a quarter of the members to the upper house, the Legislative Council of the Province of Canada on a rotation basis.

The Legislative Assembly of the Province of Canada was the primary representative body in the government of the Province of Canada. The first general election was held between February and April of 1841, following the formation of the province from unification of two British Colonies, Upper Canada and Lower Canada. The province held its last general election in June 1863, as the province was dissolved upon Canadian Confederation on July 1, 1867. The eight elections respectively elected members to the 1st Parliament to the 8th Parliament of the Province of Canada. The first four elections elected fourth-two members in each of the two component parts of the province for a total of eighty-four members, while the last four elections elected sixty-five in each for a total of 130 members.

In the first few years of the province's existence, even though its executive council was dependent on the confidence of the legislature, it answered primarily to the colonial Governor General, who was not bound by constitutional restraints and may choose to play a hands-on role in steering the government. That changed upon the election of 1848, which returned a super-majority of Reformers in opposition to the incumbent government. Upon the government's resignation, Lord Elgin, a Tory peer sent by a Whig ministry with instruction to put constitutional government into practice in the colony, invited leaders of the Reform Party to form a partisan ministry that would assume full accountability of the government, making responsible government a reality in the province.

While the political division of this period is often generalized as rivalry between the Conservative and Reform parties, the dynamic cannot be understood simply by applying modern political lens to those labels or by applying simplistic left vs right, status quo vs reform categorizations. Partisanship in this era was neither formal nor clearly defined. Allegiances of members of the legislature were influenced by many factors other than partisan affiliation. The main parties often split into multiple factions due to internal disagreement over particularly issues.

Language and religious divides both add additional complexity to the electoral and governing dynamic of the province and led to the adoptions of the principal of double majority, which required majority support not only from the legislature as a whole but of members of each of the two component parts for any major initiative. The requirement led to governing impasse and frequent collapsed of government. The instability and stalemate pushed the Conservatives led by John A. Macdonald and George-Étienne Cartier (by then united under the banner of "Liberal-Conservative Party") and the various Reform and Liberal factions led by George Brown into the Great Coalition that produced a new sovereign state known today as Canada.

Due to the fragmentation and frequent shifts of political allegiance, transition of powers between rival ministries only occasionally aligned with electoral cycle during this period.

== Partisanship ==
While political partisanship was certainly present during this era, it was neither formal nor clearly defined. There was no contemporary political maps or listing of members (of the assembly or the executive council) by "political party" per se. Partisan affiliations was not the sole, and sometimes not even the primary, determining factor of politicians' political allegiances, and how much their affiliation influenced their allegiances varied over time. Accordingly, the political affiliation classifications below serve only as general references to the broad political groupings the joint-premiers most likely belonged to, and the broad groupings the supporters of their governments most likely considered themselves as parts of. Varying classification systems/approaches and partisanship labels have been used by differing authors depending on the focus of their analysis. There were sub-groupings with membership that straddled multiple groupings with fluctuating degrees of cohesion and formality from session to session. There were moderate and radical or "ultra" members within each grouping. The ministry often could not count on the support of all members of the joint-premiers' political groupings and some counted on support from different rival fractions on different issues/voting divisions. The political deadlock and instability was the primary driver that led to the Great Coalition ministry, which eventually produced the Canadian Confederation.

== General elections held in the Province of Canada ==
=== Key dates for general elections ===
- Conservative
- Reform
- Liberal-Conservative
- Liberal/Grits
- Coalition
- Governor driven / loyalist

Year	Incumbent ministry	Writ of election issued	Elections held	Return of Writ due	Resulting parliament	
Year	Incumbent ministry	Writ of election issued	Elections held	Return of Writ due	#	Convened
1841	Sydenham	February 19, 1841	March – April 1841	April 8, 1841	1st	June 14, 1841
1844	Draper	September 24, 1844	Oct. – Nov. 1844	November 12, 1844	2nd	November 28, 1844
1847-48	Sherwood	December 6, 1847	Dec. 1847 – Jan. 1848	January 24, 1848	3rd	February 25, 1848
1851	Hincks-Morin	November 6, 1851	Nov. 25 – Dec. 20, 1851	December 24, 1851	4th	August 19, 1852
1854	Hincks-Morin	June 23, 1854	July 8 – August 7, 1854	August 10, 1854	5th	September 5, 1854
1857-58	Macdonald–Cartier I	November 28, 1857	Dec 10, 1857 – Jan 14, 1858	January 13, 1858	6th	February 25, 1858
1861	Macdonald–Cartier II	June 10, 1861	July 1–16, 1861	July 15, 1861	7th	March 26, 1862
1863	Sandfield Macdonald–Dorion	May 16, 1863	June 11 – July 2, 1863	July 3, 1863	8th	August 13, 1863

Dates for each elections were primarily sourced from the journal of the assembly.

== Specific elections ==
The elections listed below are divided into "Left" or "Reformer" camps, and "Right" or "Conservative" camps.

=== 1841 ===
The general election of members of the Legislative Assembly began on March 8, 1841, and continued into early April.

Four major parties contested the 1841 election. The Reformers were a group of pro-democracy, radical reformers in Canada West who wanted to reduce the power of the conservative government. The Family Compact were rich Tories in Canada West interested in the preservation of their power and the status quo.
Canada East had two similar groups -- Les Patriotes, a reformist group consisting largely of French Canadians, and Tories, mostly English conservatives interested in preservation of the status quo.

Movement	Canada West	Canada East	Total Seats
Reform; Left-Wing	Reform – 29	Patriotes – 21	50
Conservative; Right-Wing	Family Compact – 10	Tories – 17	27
Non-Aligned; Independent	Independent – 1	Independent – 4	5

=== 1844 ===
By 1841, the Family Compact had started calling itself Tories as well. This election also saw the creation of the Liberal Party, made up of pro-Patriot members from Canada East, who spoke English.

Movement	Canada West	Canada East	Total Seats
Conservative; Right-Wing	Tories – 28	Tories – 13	41
Reform; Left-Wing	Reform – 12	Patriotes – 23; Liberal-5	40
Non-Aligned; Independent	Independent – 1	Independent – 1	2

=== 1848 ===
By 1848, the Reformers were popular once more in Canada West.

Movement	Canada West	Canada East	Total Seats
Reform; Left-Wing	Reform – 23	Patriotes – 23; Liberal – 9	55
Conservative; Right-Wing	Tories – 18	Tories – 6	24
Non-Aligned; Independent	Independent – 1	Independent – 1	2

Due to the problems of the last parliament, the Governor General was ordered to sign everything that came from this legislature, marking the birth of responsible government in Canada. This was the celebrated Ministry of Louis-Hippolyte Lafontaine and Robert Baldwin.

=== 1851 ===
Before the 1851 election, the Patriotes changed their name to Ministeralists. After being popular and in power for so long, they began to somewhat favour the status quo, and began to lose their "radical" roots. The remaining Patriotes, became "Rouges", or "Reds" in English.

Movement	Canada West	Canada East	Total Seats
Status Quo Reform; Left-of-Center	Reform – 20	Ministeralists – 23; Liberal-9	52
Conservative; Right-Wing	Tories – 20	Tories – 3	23
Radical Reform; Left-Wing	None	Rouges – 4	4
Non-Aligned; Independent	Independent – 1	Independent – 3	4

=== 1854 ===
1854 was unique, seeing a new group rise. Some reformers were unhappy with the slow pace of reforms, and began to oppose the reformist government. They called themselves "Clear Grits" in Canada West, and gained the support of the Liberals and Rouges in Canada East. Also, around this time, the Tories began to refer to their group as the "Conservative Party".

Movement	Canada West	Canada East	Total Seats
Status Quo Reform; Centrist	Reform – 19	Ministeralists – 35	54
Radical Reform; Left-Wing	Clear Grits – 14; Left-wing Reform – 6	Rouges & Liberals – 19	39
Conservative; Right-Wing	Conservative – 25	Conservative – 9	34
Non-Aligned; Independent	Independent – 1	None	1

To stay in government, the moderate reformers formed a coalition with the Conservatives. The better-formed Conservative party, led by Sir John A. Macdonald, took over the Reform Party, and the remaining Reformers left for the Clear Grits, renaming the party, the Liberal Party. The Liberal Party is still known as the 'Grits' in most of English speaking Canada today.

=== 1858 ===
1858 saw the birth of the "Bleu" movement in Quebec. Former Ministeralists became French-Canadian Tories, and took on the name "Bleu" or Blue, to oppose the Rouges. The "new" politics were more Liberal vs. Conservative than Reform vs. the status quo as many former Reformers began to sit with the Conservatives. This Ministry was headed by George Brown.

Movement	Canada West	Canada East	Total Seats
Liberal; Left-Wing	Liberal – 34	Rouges – 10; Liberal – 5	49
Conservative; Right-Wing	Conservative – 24	Conservative – 15	39
Former Reformer; Centrist	Moderate Reformer – 5	Bleu – 33	38
Non-Aligned; Independent	Independent – 1	None	1

=== 1861 ===
The election of 1861 saw the Liberal party finally become united. This election is notable as 29 Liberals were equally elected from each half of the Province of Canada, and 35 MPs supportive of the Conservative/Centrist movements were equally elected from each half, which created a regionally balanced government.

Movement	Canada West	Canada East	Total Seats
Liberal; Left-Wing	Liberal – 29	Liberal – 29	58
Conservative; Right-Wing	Conservative – 29	Conservative – 8	37
Former Reformer; Centrist	Moderate Reformer – 6	Bleu – 27	33
Non-Aligned; Independent	None	None	None

=== 1863 ===
The final election for the Province of Canada took place in 1863. By this time, most liberals and conservatives were in favour of representation by population and confederation. George Brown led a group of Upper Canadian liberals to form a coalition with the Upper Canadian conservatives and the Lower Canadian Bleus, and began a discussion on confederation of all of the British North America colonies. The confederation project received wide support from Upper Canada, general opposition from the maritimes and Lower Canada was divided. Confederation was eventually achieved when 3 of the 6 colonies joined together to become the first four provinces of Canada.

Movement	Canada West	Canada East	Total Seats
Liberal; Left-Wing	Liberal – 41	Liberal – 25	66
Conservative; Right-Wing	Conservative – 24	Conservative – 11	35
Former Reformer; Centrist	Moderate Reformer – 2	Bleu – 25	27
Non-Aligned; Independent	None	Independent – 1	1

This election was followed by the first federal election, the 1867 Canadian federal election, and later on the first provincial elections. 1867 marked the beginning of two founding myths: the founding of the Canadian nation in English Canada and the pact between two founding peoples in French Canada.

When Canada became a Dominion of the British Empire, the Conservatives and Liberals retained their names, while the former Reformers became Liberal-Conservatives, and continued to work very closely with the Conservative Party.

== See also ==
- List of Joint Premiers of the Province of Canada
- List of Canadian federal general elections
- List of Ontario general elections
- List of Quebec general elections
- Legislative Assembly of the Province of Canada
- List of by-elections in the Province of Canada
