= Hamilton Hartley Killaly =

Province of Canada politician and civil engineer

Member of the Legislative Assembly of the Province of Canada for London, Canada West
- In office 1841–1843
- Preceded by: New position
- Succeeded by: Lawrence Lawrason

Member of the Executive Council of the Province of Canada
- In office 1841–1843
- Preceded by: New position
- Succeeded by: Position vacant

Chairman, Board of Works of Lower Canada
- In office 1840–1841
- Preceded by: New position
- Succeeded by: Position abolished

Chairman, Board of Works of the Province of Canada
- In office 1841–1846
- Preceded by: New position
- Succeeded by: William Benjamin Robinson

Assistant Commissioner of Public Works of the Province of Canada
- In office 1851–1859
- Preceded by: New position
- Succeeded by: Position abolished

Member of the Board of Railway Commissioners of the Province of Canada
- In office 1851–1859

Personal details
- Born: December 1800 Dublin, Ireland
- Died: March 28, 1874 (74 years) Picton, Ontario
- Spouse: Martha Jane Handy
- Children: Three sons, two daughters
- Profession: Engineer

Hamilton Hartley Killaly (December 1800 – March 28, 1874) was a civil engineer and political figure in Canada West.

== Early life ==
Killaly was born in Dublin, Ireland in 1800, the son of a prominent engineer, and graduated from Trinity College. He served with the Irish Board of Works as consulting engineer. In 1834, with his wife, Killaly came to New York state, later settling in London township in Upper Canada, where he tried his hand at farming.

In 1837, he was involved in a re-survey of the Welland Canal and, in 1838, was appointed engineer for the Welland Canal Company. In 1840, Governor General Thomson (later Lord Sydenham) appointed Killaly the chairman of the Board of Works for Lower Canada.

== Political career ==
In the first general election for the Province of Canada in March, 1841, Killaly was elected to the Legislative Assembly of the Province of Canada for London. In March, 1841, Governor General Sydenham named him to the Executive Council of the Province of Canada, and in December 1841, he was appointed chairman of the provincial Board of Works. Since that position was an office of profit under the Crown, he was required to resign his seat in the Assembly. He did so, and was re-elected in the resulting by-election in September 1842. A supporter of the union of the Canadas, Killaly was a moderate Reformer. He did not play a major role in the politics of the Assembly, being seen more as a professional engineer in government service. However, in 1843, he resigned from the Executive Council as part of the mass resignation to protest Governor General Metcalfe's failure to consult the councillors on political appointments.

He resigned his seat in the Assembly on November 30, 1843, and did not again stand for election.

== Public works ==
As Commissioner of Public Works, Killaly was heavily involved in the construction of the canal systems along the St. Lawrence, financed in part by the British government to contribute to the defence of the province. Although highly competent as an engineer, Killaly had little patience for cost estimates or financial reporting. Speaking of the government audit procedures, designed to keep control over the spending of public funds, Killaly commented: “What earthly use there is in this Roundabout I never could see.” Some concerns had been voiced regarding decisions made by the Board of Works and, in 1846, it was replaced by the Department of Public Works headed by William Benjamin Robinson, to assert clearer government control.

In 1842, the provincial government took over the Welland Canal. Killaly was appointed to the board of directors. In 1848, Killaly was named superintendent for the Welland Canal. He was named assistant commissioner of public works in 1851, essentially the non-political head of the operations of the Department, and served until 1859, when this position was abolished and he became inspector of railways.

In 1862, during the height of the American Civil War, when concerns were raised that the United States and Britain might go to war over the Trent Affair, he was part of a royal commission appointed by Governor General Monck that reported on the state of fortifications and defence in the Canadian colonies.

== Retirement ==
Shortly after participating in the defence commission, Killaly began to retire from public life, living first in Toronto, then Picton, where he lived quietly until his death in 1874.

== Legacy ==
In 1849, Killaly was one of the founders of the Canadian Institute, along with Sandford Fleming and Kivas Tully, as an organisation for civil engineers, surveyors and architects. Now the Royal Canadian Institute, it is the oldest Canadian society dedicated to the advancement of science.

Killaly was considered a "superlative engineer" and a first rate public servant, who fostered the careers of many in the nascent Canadian engineering profession. He was also flamboyant and unorthodox, "promenading in the capital in battered hat, open shirt, satin breeches and dancing pumps." William Agar Adamson, chaplain to Governor General Sydenham, described Killaly as "the most expensively and ill-dressed man on the wide continent of North America".

Though with a slight misspelling, Kilally Road in London, Ontario, is named for Killaly.
