= Robert Spence (Canadian politician) =

Robert Spence (1811 – February 25, 1868) was a journalist and political figure in Canada West.

He was born in Dublin in 1811 and came to Upper Canada in 1836. He taught school in Dundas. In 1846, he launched a newspaper, the Dundas Warder and Halton County General Advertiser. He helped promote the incorporation of Dundas as a town and served on the town council. In 1858, he was elected warden for the United Counties of Wentworth and Halton. In 1854, he was elected to the 5th Parliament of the Province of Canada representing Wentworth as an independent. He became Postmaster General in the government of Allan MacNab and Augustin-Norbert Morin. His acceptance of a cabinet post stirred up resentment among the Clear Grits and he was not re-elected. He introduced reduced rates for mailing newspapers and other improvements to the postal service. In 1857, he was appointed collector of customs at Toronto.

He died in Toronto in 1868.
