= Edmund Murney =

Politician in Upper Canada and Province of Canada

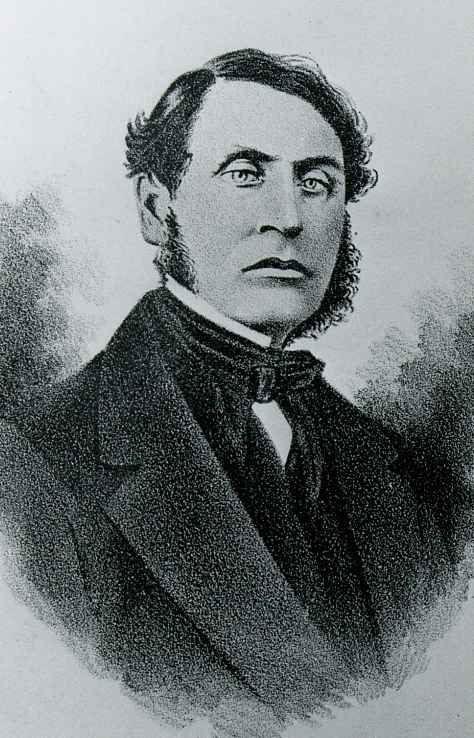

Member of the Legislative Assembly of Upper Canada for Hastings County
- In office 1836–1840
- Succeeded by: Position abolished

Member of the Parliament of the Province of Canada for Hastings, Canada West
- In office 1842–1844
- Preceded by: Robert Baldwin
- Succeeded by: Billa Flint

Personal details
- Born: November 11, 1812 Kingston, Upper Canada
- Died: August 15, 1861 (aged 48) Kingston, Canada West
- Party: Tory
- Profession: Lawyer

Edmund Fuller Murney (November 11, 1812 – August 15, 1861) was a lawyer and political figure in Upper Canada. He represented Hastings in the Legislative Assembly of Upper Canada from 1836 to 1841 and in the Legislative Assembly of the Province of Canada from 1842 to 1848 and from 1852 to 1856 as a Conservative member.

Murney was born in Kingston, Upper Canada, the son of Henry Murney. The Murney Martello Tower at Kingston is named for its location, a piece of land owned by the Murney family.

Edmund Murney was educated at Upper Canada College, studied law with Marshall Spring Bidwell and set up practice in Belleville. Murney served as a major in the militia and was a clerk of the peace for the Victoria District.

Murney first ran for election to the Upper Canada Legislative Assembly in 1836. Following the union of Upper Canada and Lower Canada in 1841, he again stood for election in Hastings for the new Legislative Assembly of the Province of Canada, but was defeated by Robert Baldwin, the leader of the Reform group. However, in 1842 Baldwin was appointed to the Executive Council in the provincial government. Under the law at that time, he was required to resign his seat and stand for election again. In the resulting by-election, Murney defeated Baldwin. Murney was re-elected in the general election of 1844, defeated in the general election of 1848, and then re-elected in the elections of 1851 and 1854. During his time in the Assembly, Murney was a moderate Tory, shifting to Conservative as party alignments developed.

In 1856, he resigned his seat in the assembly and was elected to the Legislative Council of the Province of Canada, serving until his death in Belleville at the age of 48.
