= Peter Perry (politician) =

Upper Canada politician (1792–1851)

Member of the Legislative Assembly of Upper Canada for Lennox & Addington
- In office 1824–1836

Member of the Legislative Assembly of the Province of Canada for East York
- In office 1849–1851

Personal details
- Born: November 14, 1792 Ernestown, Upper Canada
- Died: August 24, 1851 (aged 58) Saratoga Springs, New York, United States
- Resting place: Union Cemetery, Oshawa, Ontario
- Party: Clear Grit
- Occupation: businessman

Peter Perry (November 14, 1792 – August 24, 1851) was a politician and businessman in Upper Canada.

== Biography ==
He was born in Ernestown, Upper Canada (now Bath, Ontario) in 1792, the son of Robert Perry and Jemima Gary Washburn. His father was a United Empire Loyalist from Vermont who had served with the Queen's Rangers and Edward Jessup's Loyal Rangers during the American Revolution. The family settled in Township No. 2, later Ernestown. His uncle was Ebenezer Washburn, a member of the Legislative Assembly who presented Prince Edward County. In 1814, he married Mary Polly Ham.

In 1823, Perry took part in the protest against the removal of Marshall Spring Bidwell's name from the ballot in a by-election. In 1824, with Bidwell, he was elected to the 9th Parliament of Upper Canada representing Lennox and Addington Counties; both remained in office until 1836. Perry supported the resolutions advanced by the reformers in the Assembly; these were usually rejected by the more conservative Legislative Council. He supported the abolition of the clergy reserves and the separation of church and state. In 1831, he introduced legislation to allow clergymen of any recognized denomination to perform marriage ceremonies; that bill was passed.

After he was defeated in the election of 1836, he moved to Whitby, Ontario, where he established a general store and warehouses at the harbour on Windsor Bay. He also established a store at Port Perry on Lake Scugog; the town was named in honour of him. Although he was not participating in politics himself at the time, he campaigned on behalf of James Edward Small and William Hume Blake in Whitby. When Blake resigned in 1849, Perry was elected in a by-election as a member of the Clear Grits. Perry's election on Clear Grit principals in 1849 is viewed as the founding election victory in the Clear Grit movement. However, he became ill in early 1850. After a visit with Marshall Spring Bidwell in New York City in 1851, he died at Saratoga Springs, New York and was buried at Union Cemetery, Oshawa, Ontario.
