= John Simpson (Niagara politician) =

John Simpson (December 27, 1807 – September 19, 1878) was a businessman and political figure in Canada West.

He was born in Helmsley, Yorkshire, England in 1807 and came to Niagara in Upper Canada in 1835 where he entered business as a bookseller. With George Menzies as a partner, he began publishing the Niagara Chronicle in 1837. He also published some other works, including The Canadian mercantile almanack, and became sole owner of the newspaper in 1839. He took on other business interests and also served as customs collector at Niagara. Simpson served on the council for Niagara District and the town council for Niagara, serving as mayor from 1852 to 1855. In 1857, he was elected to the Legislative Assembly for Niagara; he was reelected in 1861 and 1863. In March 1864, he was named to the Executive Council as provincial secretary. Later that year, he resigned his seat, allowing William McDougall to enter the cabinet and the newly-formed Great Coalition. He was appointed deputy auditor general and served in that post until his death in Ottawa in 1878.
