= Wilson Seymour Conger =

Wilson Seymour Conger (1804 – July 27, 1864) was a merchant and political figure in Canada West.

He was born in Hallowell Township in Upper Canada in 1804 and moved to Cobourg. In 1835, he helped form the Cobourg and Peterborough Railway Company. He served on the Cobourg Board of Police from 1837 to 1841. In 1841, he was appointed sheriff for the Colborne District and later served in the same post for Peterborough County until 1856.

He served on the town council for Peterborough from 1850 to 1859, serving as mayor in 1856 and county warden in 1859. In a by-election held in 1856, he was elected to the Legislative Assembly for Peterborough; he was not reelected in 1857. In 1859, he was sued by the town for the withholding of municipal debentures transferred from Wolford Township. He was reelected to the Legislative Assembly in 1863.

He died of tuberculosis in Peterborough in 1864, while still in office.

Artist Paul Kane painted several portraits of Conger and his wife between 1834 and 1836.
