= William Benjamin Robinson =

Canadian politician

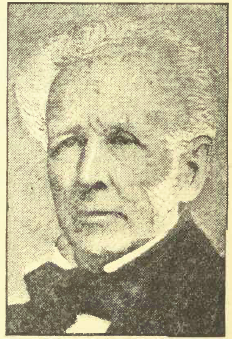

Member of the Legislative Assembly of Upper Canada for Simcoe
- In office 1830–1840
- Preceded by: John Cawthra
- Succeeded by: Charles Wickens

Member of the Legislative Assembly of the Province of Canada for Simcoe (1844-1854) and Simcoe South (1854-1855)
- In office 1844–1855
- Preceded by: Elmes Yelverton Steele
- Succeeded by: Thomas Roberts Ferguson

Personal details
- Born: December 22, 1797 Kingston, Upper Canada
- Died: July 18, 1873 (aged 75) Toronto, Ontario
- Spouse: Elizabeth Ann Jarvis
- Profession: Fur trader, political figure

William Benjamin Robinson (December 22, 1797 – July 18, 1873) was a fur trader and political figure in Upper Canada.

He was born in Kingston in 1797, the son of Christopher Robinson and Esther Sayre, and moved to York (Toronto) with his family in 1798. In 1802, his mother remarried after his father's death and moved to Newmarket, where he grew up. Robinson later took over his stepfather's (Elisha Beman) mills and stores. He later joined his brother Peter in the fur trade, operating mainly in the Muskoka district. In 1830, he was elected to the Legislative Assembly of Upper Canada for Simcoe; he was reelected in 1834 and 1836. He oversaw the development of the Welland Canal starting in 1833.

In 1843, he negotiated a treaty with the Chippewas of Lake Simcoe where 700 acres (2.8 km^{2}) were "set aside to be held in trust" for their use. In 1844, he was elected to the Legislative Assembly of the Province of Canada for Simcoe as a Tory; he held the seat until 1854, when he was reelected in South Simcoe. In December in that year, he was appointed inspector-general; he resigned the following March because he opposed William Henry Draper's bill to create a University of Upper Canada. In 1846, he was appointed chief commissioner of public works. In the assembly, he opposed the secularization of King's College and of the clergy reserves. He helped promote a railway link between the Province of Canada and the Maritimes. He opposed a proposed Separate School act for Canada West in 1855.

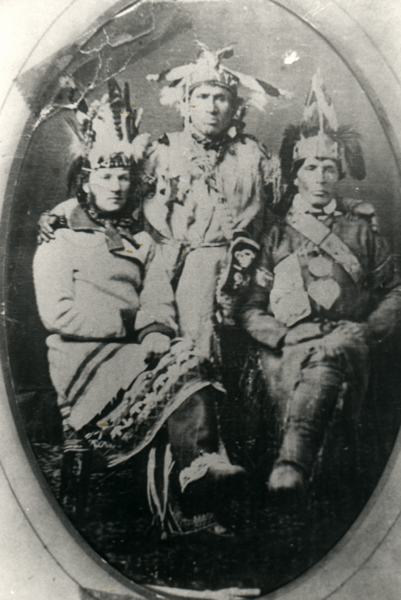
William B. Robinson (left), Chief Shingwauk (centre) and Chief Nebenaigoching (right), at the signing of the Robinson Treaties, 1850

In 1850, he negotiated two more treaties with native leaders:

- one covering land along Lake Superior from Batchawana Bay to Pigeon River
- one which covered land from Batchawana Bay to Penetanguishene

In 1852, he became a commissioner of the Canada Company.

After the death of his wife in 1865, Robinson left Canada and returned in 1867. He died in Toronto in 1873.

His brother John Beverley was a judge and member of the Legislative Assembly and Legislative Council.
