= Hope Fleming Mackenzie =

Hope Fleming Mackenzie (May 24, 1821 – June 4, 1866) was a Canadian cabinet-maker, shipbuilder and political figure in Canada West. He represented Lambton from 1860 to 1861 and North Oxford from 1863 to 1866 in the Legislative Assembly of the Province of Canada as a Reformer.

He was born in Logierait, Perthshire, the son of Alexander Mackenzie and Mary Stewart Fleming. Mackenzie came to Canada West in 1842, settling in Sarnia in 1847. He ran unsuccessfully for a seat in the Legislative Assembly in 1859 and then was elected in an 1860 by-election held after Malcolm Cameron was named to the Legislative Council. He chose not to run for reelection in 1861 for business reasons and his brother Alexander was elected in Lambton. Mackenzie was persuaded to run again in North Oxford in 1863 but later died in office at the age of 45.

His brother Alexander went on to become the second Prime Minister of Canada.
