= Great Coalition =

Canadian political coalition (1864–1867)

The Great Coalition was a grand coalition of political parties that brought an end to political deadlock in the Province of Canada. It existed from May 1864 until Confederation in 1867.

== Prelude ==
Four different ministries had failed in the previous six years, when the eight-month-old Liberal government of John Sandfield Macdonald and Antoine-Aime Dorion (the Sandfield Macdonald-Dorion Ministry) resigned in March 1864, becoming the fifth cabinet to collapse. Governor-General the Viscount Monck sought out several widely respected leaders to attempt to form the next government, including Alexander Campbell of Kingston and Adam Johnston Fergusson Blair of Guelph. Each of the men approached refused, citing the extreme difficulty of the task. Finally, Parti bleu stalwart Étienne-Paschal Taché and Liberal-Conservative leader John A. Macdonald agreed to take on the task, in that same month of March 1864. A new government was sworn in; it fell after less than three months, in May 1864, to become the sixth government to fall in six years.

It had become clear to most political leaders that continued governance of Canada East and Canada West under the Act of Union 1840 was no longer tenable. To reform the political system, however, a coalition was formed between the Liberals under George Brown, the Parti bleu under George-Étienne Cartier, and the Liberal-Conservatives under John A. Macdonald. The formation of this coalition took place between June 14 and 30 and was officially completed on June 22, under George-Étienne Cartier and John A. Macdonald.

== Establishment ==
The formation of the Great Coalition did not go smoothly. George Brown demanded a ministry of twelve members that included four Liberals out of six members from Canada West (as Liberals commanded an overwhelming majority of political support in Ontario), and two from Canada East (as they received a significant minority of support in Quebec). Also, Brown himself did not want to serve in the ministry, hoping instead to arrange for his allies to serve in his stead. In the end, he was convinced to accept only three spots on the Canada West side of the ministry, and to accept one of those spot himself, as it was agreed the Great Coalition would only work if George Brown was a member.

In the end, the Great Coalition was really only a modified version of the Taché-Macdonald Ministry of March-May 1864, with two moderate Reformers (Isaac Buchanan of Hamilton and Michael Hamilton Foley of Waterloo) and one Conservative (John Simpson of Niagara) replaced by three robust Liberals, two of whom (Oliver Mowat and William Mcdougall) having sat in the most recent Liberal ministry, that of Sandfield Macdonald-Dorion (the third Liberal being the reluctant George Brown). The Canada East side of the ministry was unchanged.

== Reasons ==
The Great Coalition was created to eradicate the political deadlock between Canada West and Canada East. The government at that time was unable to pass any legislation because of the need for a double majority. For a bill to pass in the Legislative Assembly, it had to be approved by a Majority of both the Canada East and Canada West sections of the assembly. As the French speakers and the English speakers seldom agreed, this caused political deadlock. The Great Coalition was intended to resolve the deadlock with a long-term solution for some of these problems, and to unify Canada.

== Confederation ==
The Great Coalition arranged three conferences that preceded Confederation. The first was the Charlottetown Conference, which was convened to negotiate Maritime Union. However, the politicians began to discuss the possibility of a larger union that would include all of British North America. This continued at the Quebec Conference where they further discussed the union of British North America and defined the details of the government's shape. They also settled on the division of provincial and federal responsibilities. The London Conference revised the Quebec Resolutions.

== Members ==
(Blue = Conservative; Pink = Liberal)

Canada West		Canada East	
Attorney General West; DEPUTY PREMIER	John A. Macdonald (Kingston)		
Attorney General West; DEPUTY PREMIER	John A. Macdonald (Kingston)	Attorney General East	George-Étienne Cartier (Montreal East)
President of Executive Council	George Brown (Oxford South)		
President of Executive Council	George Brown (Oxford South)	Finance	Alexander Galt (Sherbrooke)
Postmaster General	Oliver Mowat (Ontario South)		
Postmaster General	Oliver Mowat (Ontario South)	Receiver-General; PREMIER	Étienne-Paschal Taché (Legislative Council)
Provincial Secretary	William McDougall (Ontario North)		
Provincial Secretary	William McDougall (Ontario North)	Commissioner of Public Works	Jean-Charles Chapais (Kamouraska)
Commissioner of Crown Lands	Alexander Campbell (Legislative Council)		
Commissioner of Crown Lands	Alexander Campbell (Legislative Council)	Agriculture (and Immigration)	Thomas D'Arcy McGee (Montreal West)
Solicitor General West	James Cockburn (Northumberland West)		
Solicitor General West	James Cockburn (Northumberland West)	Solicitor General East	Hector-Louis Langevin (Dorchester)

There were several changes in the membership of the Great Coalition over its three years of existence:

- Oliver Mowat resigned in November 1864 to take up a position as Vice-Chancellor of Canada West. He was succeeded as Postmaster General by fellow Liberal William Pearce Howland (member for York West). Howland had sat on the Sandfield Macdonald-Dorion Ministry of 1863-1864
- Étienne-Paschal Taché died July 1865. He was succeeded at Receiver General and as Premier by fellow Conservative Narcisse-Fortunat Belleau (of the Legislative Council).
- George Brown resigned in protest of Cabinet policy December 1865. He was succeeded as President of Executive Council by fellow Liberal AJ Fergusson Blair (of Legislative Council). Fergusson Blair had sat on the Sandfield Macdonald-Dorion Ministry of 1863-1864
- Alexander Galt resigned in protest of Cabinet policy August 1866. He was succeeded as Finance Minister by WP Howland; Howland was succeeded as Postmaster general by Hector Langevin. It is not clear that anyone succeeded Langevin as Solicitor General East.

== Legacy ==
All fifteen members of the Great Coalition are remembered as Fathers of Confederation. With the exception of Étienne-Paschal Taché, who died in 1865, all members of the Great Coalition went on to play prominent roles in the early years of Confederation. Nine members went on to join the 1st Canadian Ministry, sworn in just before Confederation in 1867. James Cockburn became the first Speaker of the House of Commons (1867-1874). Oliver Mowat pursued provincial politics, becoming the third Premier of Ontario (1872-1896), and later was elder statesman in the Ministry of Sir Wilfrid Laurier (1896-1897). Narcisse-Fortunat Belleau became the first Lieutenant Governor of Quebec (1867-1873).
