= Timothée Brodeur =

Timothée Brodeur (October 2, 1804 – November 12, 1860) was a notary and political figure in Canada East. He represented Bagot in the Legislative Assembly of the Province of Canada from 1854 to 1858 as a Reformer.

He was born in Varennes, the son of Toussaint Brodeur and Archange Fournier-Préfontaine. He received his commission as a notary in 1826 and practised in Saint-Hugues until 1861. Brodeur also served as postmaster, justice of the peace and commissioner for the summary trial of minor causes. He was an officer in the militia, serving first as captain and later reaching the rank of lieutenant-colonel. In 1853, he married Louise Sénécal. His election in 1854 was overturned on appeal in September but he was elected again in the by-election held the following month. Brodeur did not run for reelection in 1854. He died at Saint-Hugues at the age of 57.
