= John Wetenhall =

John Wetenhall (1669-1717) was Archdeacon of Cork from 1697 until his death.

The son of Edward Wetenhall, Bishop of Cork & Ross, he was born in Devon and educated at Trinity College, Cambridge. He held the living at Moviddy and was also a prebendary of Ross Cathedral.
