= Jacques-Olivier Bureau =

Canadian politician

The Honourable Jacques-Olivier Bureau
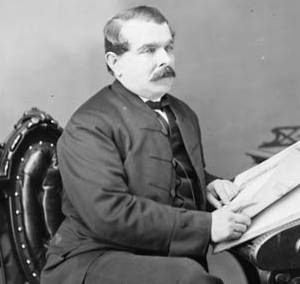

Canadian Senator from Quebec
- In office 1867–1883
- Appointed by: Royal Proclamation
- Succeeded by: Alexandre Lacoste

Personal details
- Born: February 6, 1820 Trois-Rivières, Lower Canada
- Died: February 7, 1883 (aged 63) Saint-Rémi, Quebec, Canada
- Party: Liberal

Jacques-Olivier Bureau (February 6, 1820 – February 7, 1883) was a Quebec notary and political figure. He was a Liberal member of the Senate of Canada for De Lorimier division from 1867 to 1883.

He was born in Trois-Rivières, Lower Canada, in 1820 and studied there and at the Séminaire de Nicolet. He qualified as a notary in 1843 and practiced in Saint-Rémi and Montreal. In 1854, he was elected to the Legislative Assembly of the Province of Canada for Napierville; he was re-elected in 1858 and 1861. In 1862, he was elected to the Legislative Council in Lorimier division. Bureau was active in promoting the abolition of seigneurial tenure in Canada East. He was named provincial secretary in 1863, a cabinet post; as a result, he had to run again (successfully) for his seat in the legislative council. After Confederation, he was appointed to the Senate.

He died in Saint-Rémi in 1883.
