= William Cayley (Canadian politician) =

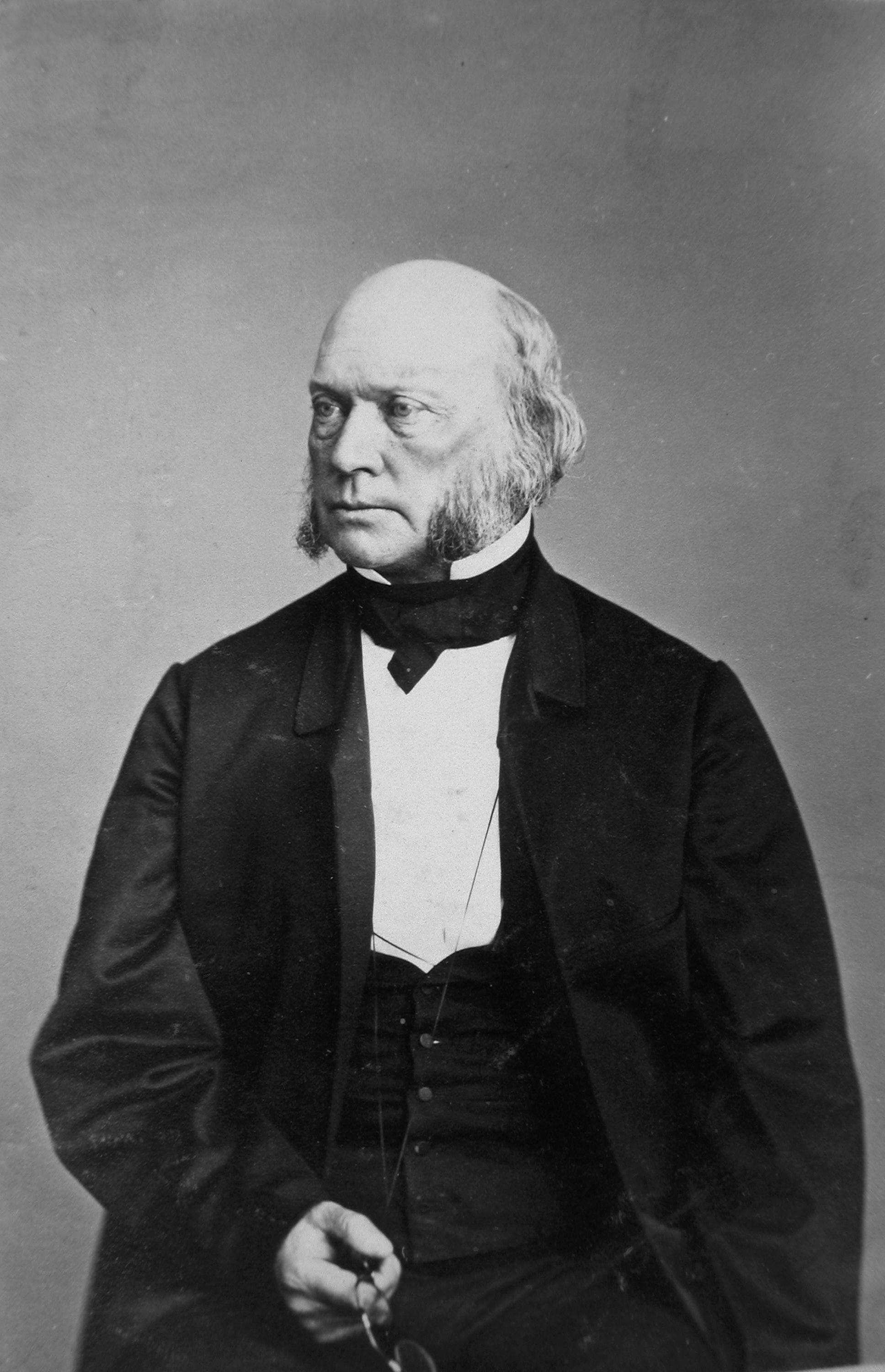
Photographic portrait of 'William Cayley' (1807-1890), lawyer and political figure in Canada West, taken in 1863.

William Cayley (May 26, 1807 – February 23, 1890) was a lawyer and political figure in Canada West.

He was born in Saint Petersburg, Russia in 1807, the son of a British consul, and studied in England. He was called to the bar in 1835 and subsequently came to Upper Canada where he was admitted to the bar in 1838. In 1836, he married Emma Robinson, the daughter of D'Arcy Boulton. He opened a practice in Toronto, later partnering with Matthew Crooks Cameron. In 1845, he was chosen as Inspector General, a post in the Executive Council, and elected to the Legislative Assembly in a by-election held in Huron in 1846 and was reelected in 1848. He was defeated in the 1851 election, but elected again in Huron and Bruce in 1854, serving on the Board of Railway Commissioners and once again as Inspector General. In 1855, Cayley introduced the Audit Act which established an auditor of public accounts and the Audit Board, a new government department. He was elected one more time in an 1858 by-election for Renfrew; he retired from politics in 1861. He served as a director of the Bank of Upper Canada and was president in 1861. He served as Auditor General for the province of Ontario from 1870 to 1877. Cayley died in Toronto in 1890.

His son Hugh Cayley became a Member of the Northwest Territories Legislative Assembly serving from 1886 until 1894.
