= Clergy reserve =

Land reserves in colonial Canada

Clergy reserves were tracts of land in Upper Canada and Lower Canada reserved for the support of "Protestant clergy" by the Constitutional Act 1791. One-seventh of all surveyed Crown lands were set aside, totaling 2,395,687 acres (9,695 km^{2}) and 934,052 acres (3,780 km^{2}) respectively for each province, and provision was made to dedicate some of those reserved lands as glebe land in support of any parsonage or rectory that may be established by the Church of England. The provincial legislatures could vary or repeal these provisions, but royal assent could not be given before such passed bills having been laid before both houses of the British Parliament for at least thirty days.

== Upper Canada ==
The first lieutenant governor of Upper Canada, John Graves Simcoe, interpreted "Protestant clergy" to mean the clergy of Church of England only. However, in 1823 the Law Officers of the Crown held that the Church of Scotland was also entitled to a share of the revenues under the 1791 Act. Although Lt-Governor Maitland attempted to suppress the publication of that decision, the Legislature passed resolutions the following year that recognized that church's status.

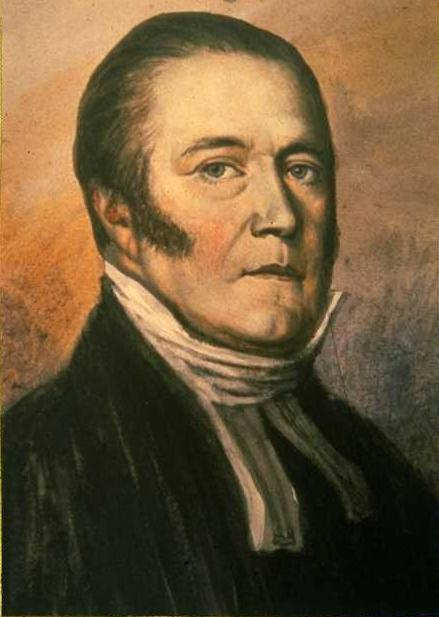
John Strachan

Complications in establishing leasing procedures prevented the reserve lands from being leased before 1803. Until 1819, the reserve lands were managed by the Province, and in most years they earned revenues that were barely sufficient to cover their expenses. After the Rev. John Strachan was appointed to the Executive Council of Upper Canada in 1815, he began to push for the Church of England's autonomous control of the clergy reserves on the model of the Clergy Corporation of Lower Canada, created in 1817. The Clergy Corporation, of which Strachan became the chairman, was subsequently incorporated in 1819 to manage the clergy reserves.

The 1819 charter (drafted by Strachan's former student, Attorney General John Beverly Robinson) provided for the Bishop of Quebec to become the perpetual Principal and Director (as he was for the Lower Canada body), who, with twelve other directors, constituted the Board. The Bishop's Official (named by the Bishop) and the rectors of Niagara and York could each serve as acting chairman.

Other perpetual directors were:

- the incumbents at Kingston, Niagara, York, Cornwall, Grimsby, Ancaster and Hamilton; and
- the Inspector General and Surveyor General of the Province of Upper Canada.

Any two directors, together with the Principal or an acting chairman, constituted a quorum, but, because of the poor network of roads, most clergy members were generally unable to attend Corporation meetings. This effectively meant that Strachan (as rector of York), together with the Inspector General and Surveyor General, controlled the Board. These three members were part of the Family Compact, of which Strachan was the leader.

The reserves were allotted in lots of 200 acres (81 ha), generally intermixed with other lots sold to individuals within each surveyed township. Except in the Talbot Settlement (where they were located off the main roads), they were generally arranged in a checkerboard pattern within each township, and were a serious obstacle to economic development as they were effectively wasteland, either being abandoned by lessees after the timber had been fully harvested, or unattractive because of the availability of cheap freehold land. This was recognized by the Legislative Assembly in 1817 when it passed resolutions that condemned the lands as "insurmountable obstacles" and called on the Parliament in Westminster to authorize their sale.

Until 1827, no reserve lands were sold. They were leased for terms of twenty-one years, with rents on a sliding scale:

Lease terms for clergy reserve lands (1791–1819)
Period	Granted before April 1811	Granted from April 1811	Area covered
First 7 years	10s.	£1 15s.	per lot of 200 acres (81 ha) or less
Next 7 years	20s.	£3 10s.	per lot of 200 acres (81 ha) or less
Last 7 years	£1 10s.	£5 5s.	per lot of 200 acres (81 ha) or less

Even with higher rates being charged from 1819, total annual revenues were still only £1200 in 1824, and only one-third could be collected without pursuing legal action.

In 1826, the Canada Company was formed to sell off the remaining crown and clergy reserves in the province. However, because of opposition from Strachan, the company received 1,100,000 acres (1,719 sq mi; 4,452 km^{2}) in the Huron Tract, in substitution for the originally contemplated 829,430 acres (1,296 sq mi; 3,357 km^{2}) of clergy reserve lands. As the provincial policy of free land grants had come to an end, Strachan lobbied for and secured an Act from the British Parliament granting authority to sell up to one-fourth of all reserve lands, up to 100,000 acres (156 sq mi; 405 km^{2}) each year, from which there would be income sufficient to support 200–300 Anglican clergymen.

In 1836, before Sir John Colborne was succeeded by Sir Francis Bond Head as lieutenant-governor, he created 57 rectories for the Church of England, with glebe land totalling 21,057 acres (33 sq mi; 85 km^{2}). This action created significant political dissent, and was subsequently declared illegal in 1837, but was later held in 1856 to have been lawful. In the interim, it became one of the issues in the Upper Canada Rebellion of 1837 (and subsequently identified as such in the 1838 report written by Lord Durham), where William Lyon Mackenzie exclaimed to the crowd outside Montgomery's Tavern:

Stick true to the cause of Liberty, and you shall, every man of you, have three hundred Acres of Land and a piece out of the Clergy Reserves!

The Parliament of Upper Canada passed a bill to sell the reserves in 1840, but the Governor General reserved the bill for consideration by the British government, which disallowed the bill. The British then enacted the Clergy Reserves in Canada Act 1840 (3 & 4 Vict. c. 78) later in that year. Although considered to be more favourable to the Church of England, the Act as passed provided that only one-half of future sales would be dedicated on a 2:1 basis to the Churches of England and Scotland, with the remaining half being distributed to all other churches according to their respective strengths. The administration of the reserve lands was transferred to the Crown Lands Department, where it was handled in a more professional manner.

== Lower Canada ==
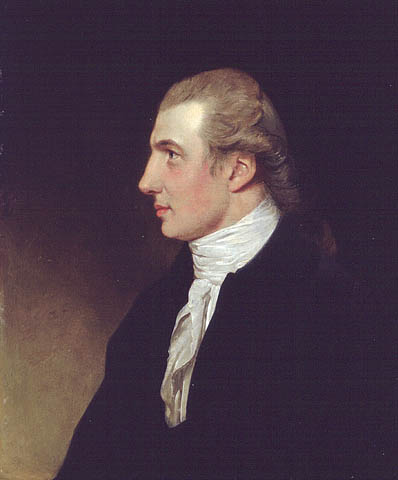
Bishop Jacob Mountain

Unlike the distribution of lots that was pursued by Simcoe in Upper Canada, Alured Clarke, lieutenant-governor of Lower Canada, instituted a policy of setting aside large blocks of land apart from either current or contiguous settlement.

The Clergy Corporation in Lower Canada, more formally known as the "Corporation for Superintending, Managing and Conducting the Clergy Reserves within the Province of Lower-Canada", was constituted with the Bishop of Quebec (initially the Right Rev. Jacob Mountain) as perpetual Principal and Director, and with rectors of four parishes within the diocese constituted as perpetual directors. In 1828, a British parliamentary committee reported that leases were being granted on certain terms:

Lease terms for clergy reserve lands in Lower Canada per 200-acre lot (1828)
Period	Rent in specie	Rent in kind, in the alternative
First 7 years	25s.	8 bushels of wheat
Next 7 years	£2 10s.	16 bushels
Last 7 years	£3 15s.	24 bushels

The reserve lands generated little income in Lower Canada, with the average annual profit from such activity amounting to only £3 between 1791 and 1837.

== Abolition ==
Pressure arose to reform the entire structure of the reserves, but the government of Robert Baldwin and Louis-Hippolyte Lafontaine chose not to proceed on such a course, because of the resistance of the established churches and the roadblocks presented by the 1791 Act. However, such caution eventually came to be seen as inflexibility, which would be overcome by the rise of the Grit movement in 1850.

Even as late as 1853, Strachan was still campaigning to ensure the Church of England's dominance in the matter. As he stated in a letter to Lord Newcastle:

Can religious liberty be preserved in no other way than by putting all religions on a level, as equally entitled for support from public encouragement and protection? Are the Koran, the Vedas, the book of the Mormons, and the Holy Bible, to be held equally sacred? And are the public authorities, the organs by which the nation acts, to take any of these indifferently as the rule to direct them in their public proceedings? And in a nation of Protestants, who have high and peculiar interests to preserve and transmit to posterity, are all places of power and trust, and even the Throne itself, to be open equally to the Atheist, the Infidel, the Pagan, the Mussulman, the Romanist, the Mormon and the Protestant? Is the kingdom of Satan, in whatever shape it may appear, to enjoy the same public favor as the Kingdom of God? Is a Christian Church, a Pagan temple, and a mosque, to be equally held in honor? In one word, is "the freedom of the City to be bestowed on all the gods of mankind?"

Following the victory of Augustin-Norbert Morin and Allan MacNab in the 1854 general election, in conjunction with the abolition of seigneurial tenure in Lower Canada, the lands were finally removed from church control and secularized under an Act of the Parliament of the Province of Canada, under which:

- sales and other revenues from the reserves were constituted as separate funds dedicated to municipal purposes in Upper and Lower Canada, and
- recipients of stipends could cede their life claims to their respective churches, which could in turn commute the sums of such claims at 6% per annum.

== Impact and aftermath ==
Reform of the clergy reserves was a major issue in Canadian politics from its creation until its abolition. The controversy stemmed from the fact that many supporters of the religious endowment were part of the Tory ruling class. Even Robert Baldwin, who was the leader of the struggle for Responsible Government did not advocate for complete abolition and chose to resign his seat rather than tackle the question.

In 1867, the Municipalities Funds for Upper and Lower Canada were declared to be part of the joint property of the new provinces of Ontario and Quebec, subject to division and adjustment at a later date by arbitrators appointed under s. 142 of the British North America Act, 1867. The funds were awarded to each province respectively in September 1870, and the award itself was held to be valid by the Judicial Committee of the Privy Council in March 1878. In Ontario, the Fund continued to be accounted for separately until the passage of an Act in 1908, where all special funds were declared to form part of the province's Consolidated Revenue Fund.

== See also ==
- Anglican Church of Canada
- Jesuit Estates Act – religious land settlement occurring in Quebec in 1888
- Queen's Bush

== Bibliography ==
- Fahey, Curtis (1991). In His Name: The Anglican Experience in Upper Canada, 1791-1854. Ottawa: Carleton University Press. ISBN 0-88629-125-9.
- Hayes, Alan Lauffer (2004). Anglicans in Canada: Controversies and Identity in Historical Perspective. Champaign: University of Illinois Press. ISBN 0-252-02902-X.
- Hincks, Francis (1869). Religious Endowments in Canada: The Clergy Reserve and Rectory Questions; A chapter of Canadian history. London: Dalton & Lucy.
- Lindsey, Charles; Rolph, John (1851). The clergy reserves: their history and present position, showing the systematic attempts that have been made to establish in connection with the state, a dominant church in Canada, With a full account of the rectories. Also an appendix containing Dr. Rolph's speech on the clergy reserves, delivered in 1836. Toronto: "North American" Press.
- Lee, Robert C. (2004). The Canada Company and the Huron Tract 1826–1853: Personalities, Profits and Politics. Toronto: Natural Heritage Books. ISBN 1-896219-94-2.
- Ryerson, Egerton (1839). The clergy reserve question : as a matter of history, a question of law, a subject of legislation : in a series of letters to the Hon. W.H. Draper, M.P.P., member of the Executive Council, and Her Majesty's solicitor general of Upper Canada. Toronto: JH Lawrence.
- Ryerson, Egerton (1882). Canadian Methodism: Its Epochs and Characteristics. Toronto: Methodist Book and Publishing House (Wm. Briggs).
- Ryerson, Egerton (1884). Hodgins, J. George (ed.). The Story of My Life. Prepared under the supervision of the literary trustees The Rev. S.S. Nelles, The Rev. John Potts and J. George Hodgins. Toronto: William Briggs.
- Schrauwers, Albert (2009). Union is Strength: W.L. Mackenzie, the Children of Peace and the Emergence of Joint Stock Democracy in Upper Canada. Toronto: University of Toronto Press. ISBN 978-0-8020-9927-3.
- Strachan, John (1853). The clergy reserves: a letter from the Lord Bishop of Toronto to the Duke of Newcastle, Her Majesty's secretary to the colonies. Toronto: Churchman Office.
- Wilson, Alan (1968). The Clergy Reserves of Upper Canada: a Canadian mortmain. University of Toronto Press. OCLC 581126223.
- Wilson, Alan (1969). The Clergy Reserves of Upper Canada (PDF). Ottawa: Canadian Historical Association. ISBN 0-88798-057-0. Archived from the original (PDF) on 2017-06-01.
- Wilson, George Alan (1959). The Political and Administrative History of the Upper Canada Clergy Reserves, 1790-1855 (PhD). Toronto: University of Toronto.

=== Bills ===
- Right Honourable C. Poulett Thomson; Legislative Assembly and Legislative Council of His Majesty's Province of Upper Canada (1840). Copy of an Act passed by the Legislature of Upper Canada to provide for the sale of the Clergy Reserves, and for the distribution of the proceeds thereof; together with Copy of a Despatch from the Governor General of Canada, dated 22d January 1840. Ordered to be printed 23d March 1840.
