= Clear Grits =

Upper Canadian political party

- Leader: George Brown
- Founded: 1850
- Dissolved: July 1, 1867
- Preceded by: Reformers
- Merged into: Liberal Party of Canada
- Succeeded by: Ontario Liberal Party
- Headquarters: Toronto, Canada West
- Ideology: Classical liberalism Liberalism

Clear Grits were reformers in the Canada West district of the Province of Canada, a British colony that is now the Province of Ontario, Canada. Their name is said to have been given by George Brown, who said that only those were wanted in the party who were "all sand and no dirt, clear grit all the way through".

Their support was concentrated among southwestern Canada West farmers, who were frustrated and disillusioned by the 1849 Reform government of Robert Baldwin and Louis-Hippolyte Lafontaine's lack of democratic enthusiasm. The Clear Grits advocated universal male suffrage, representation by population, democratic institutions, reductions in government expenditure, abolition of the Clergy Reserves, voluntarism, and free trade with the United States. Clear Grits from Upper Canada shared many ideas with Thomas Jefferson.

== History ==
The Clear Grit platform was first laid out at a convention held at Markham in March 1850, which included the following planks:

1. The abrogation of the rectories, and the secularization of the Clergy Reserves.
2. Retrenchment in provincial expenditure.
3. Abolition of the pensioning system.
4. The appointment of all local officials by local municipal councils.
5. Thorough judicial reform, especially the abolition of the court of chancery.
6. A great extension of the elective franchise, and vote by ballot.
7. Repeal of the law of primogeniture.
8. Abolition of copyright.
9. The right of the people to discuss peacefully any question affecting the government or constitution of the colony.
10. Election of the three branches of the legislature by the people of the dominion.

Initially led by Peter Perry, they later came under the leadership of Toronto newspaper editor George Brown. In 1857, the Clear Grits joined with the Reform Party, which was a loose alliance of liberal-minded reformers that became the Ontario Liberal Party and Liberal Party of Canada.

== Impact ==
The "Clear Grits" was one of a long series of farmer-based radical reform movements. Later examples were the United Farmers and the Co-operative Commonwealth Federation, the direct ancestor of the modern New Democratic Party.

Following the abolition of the party, the single-word epithet "Grit" became a common nickname for Canadian Liberals generally.

== See also ==
- Liberalism
- Contributions to liberal theory
- Liberalism worldwide
- List of liberal parties
- Liberal democracy
- Liberalism in Canada
- Politics of Canada
- Tories
