= Province of Canada =

British possession in North America (1841–1867)

Coordinates: 45.5°N 75.5°W

Province of Canada Province du Canada (French)
- 1841–1867
- Flag Coat of arms
- Anthem: God Save the Queen
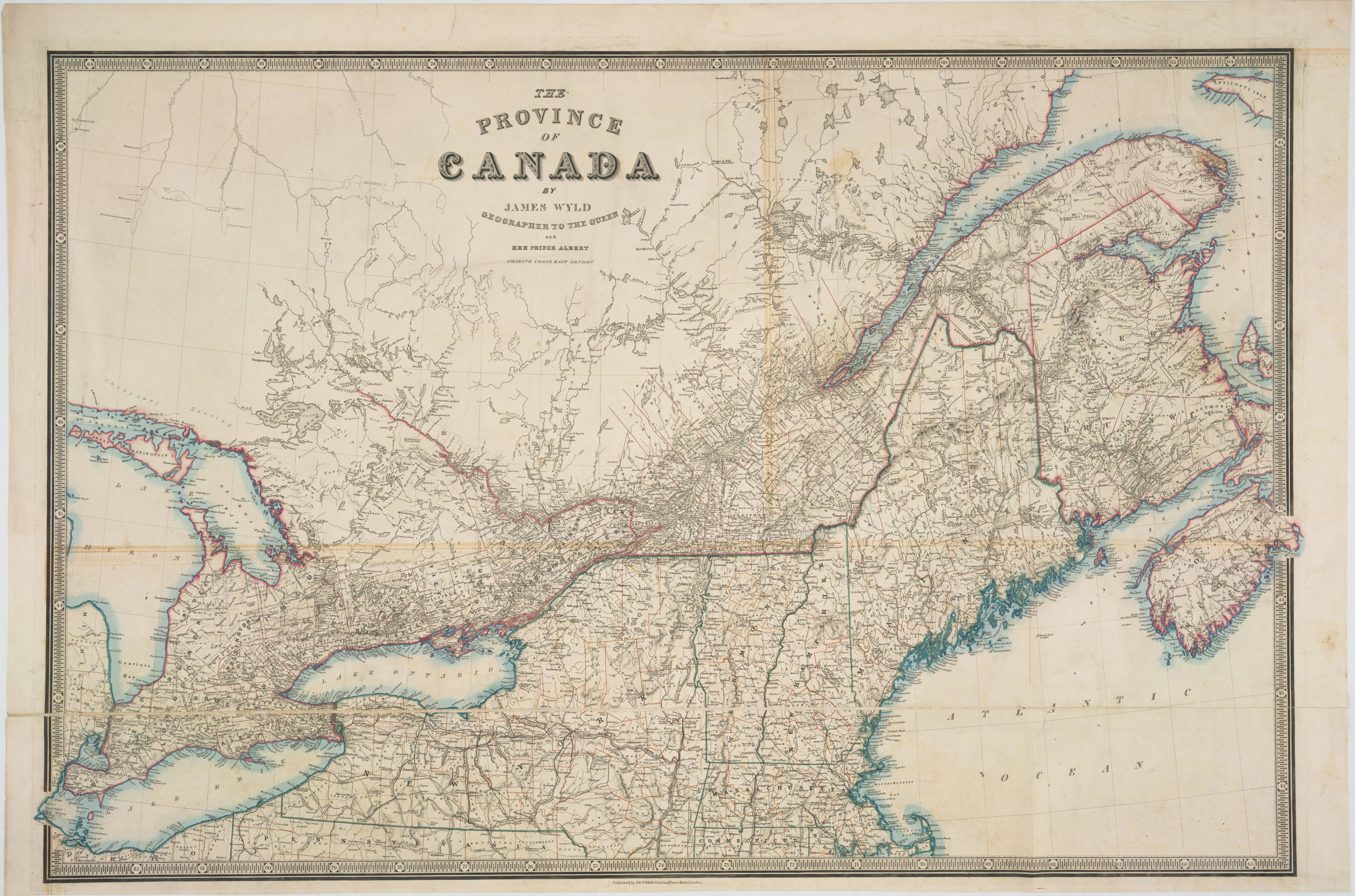
- Status: British colony
- Capital: Kingston (1841–1844); Montreal (1844–1849); Toronto (1849–1851, 1855–1859); Quebec City (1851–1855, 1859–1865); Ottawa (1865–1867)
- Largest city: Montreal
- Official languages: English; French
- Religion: Church of England (modern Anglican Church of Canada), the established church in Canada West (1841–1854)
- Government: Responsible government under a constitutional monarchy
- Monarch
  - 1841–1867: Queen Victoria
- Governor General
  - 1841: Charles Poulett Thomson, 1st Baron Sydenham
  - 1861–1867: Charles Monck, 4th Viscount Monck
- Premier
  - 1841–1842: Samuel Harrison
- Legislature: Parliament of the Province of Canada
  - Upper house: Legislative Council
  - Lower house: Legislative Assembly
- Historical era: Pre-Confederation era
  - Act of Union: 10 February 1841
  - Responsible government: 11 March 1848
  - Canadian Confederation: 1 July 1867

Population
  - 1860–61: 2,507,657
- Currency: Canadian pound sterling, (1841–1858); Canadian dollar, (1858–1867)
Preceded by
| Upper Canada |
| Lower Canada |
Succeeded by
| Canada |
| Ontario |
| Quebec |
- Today part of: Canada; Ontario; Quebec

The Province of Canada (or the United Province of Canada or the United Canadas) was a British colony in British North America from 1841 to 1867. Its formation reflected recommendations made by John Lambton, 1st Earl of Durham, in the Report on the Affairs of British North America following the Rebellions of 1837–1838.

The Act of Union 1840, passed on 23 July 1840 by the British Parliament and proclaimed by the Crown on 10 February 1841, merged the Colonies of Upper Canada and Lower Canada by abolishing their separate parliaments and replacing them with a single one with two houses, a Legislative Council as the upper chamber and the Legislative Assembly as the lower chamber. In the aftermath of the Rebellions of 1837–1838, unification of the two Canadas was driven by two factors. Firstly, Upper Canada was near bankruptcy because it lacked stable tax revenues, and needed the resources of the more populous Lower Canada to fund its internal transportation improvements. Secondly, unification was an attempt to swamp the French vote by giving each of the former provinces the same number of parliamentary seats, despite the larger population of Lower Canada.

Although Durham's report had called for the Union of the Canadas and for responsible government (a government accountable to an independent local legislature), only the first of the two recommendations was implemented in 1841. For the first seven years, the government was led by an appointed governor general accountable only to the British government. Responsible government was not achieved until the second LaFontaine–Baldwin ministry in 1849, when Governor General James Bruce, 8th Earl of Elgin, agreed that the cabinet would be formed by the largest party in the Legislative Assembly, making the premier the head of the government and reducing the governor general to a more symbolic role.

The Province of Canada ceased to exist at Canadian Confederation on 1 July 1867, when it was divided into the Canadian provinces of Ontario and Quebec. Ontario included the area occupied by the pre-1841 British colony of Upper Canada, while Quebec included the area occupied by the pre-1841 British colony of Lower Canada (which had included Labrador until 1809, when Labrador was transferred to the British colony of Newfoundland). Upper Canada was primarily English-speaking, whereas Lower Canada was primarily French-speaking.

== Geography ==
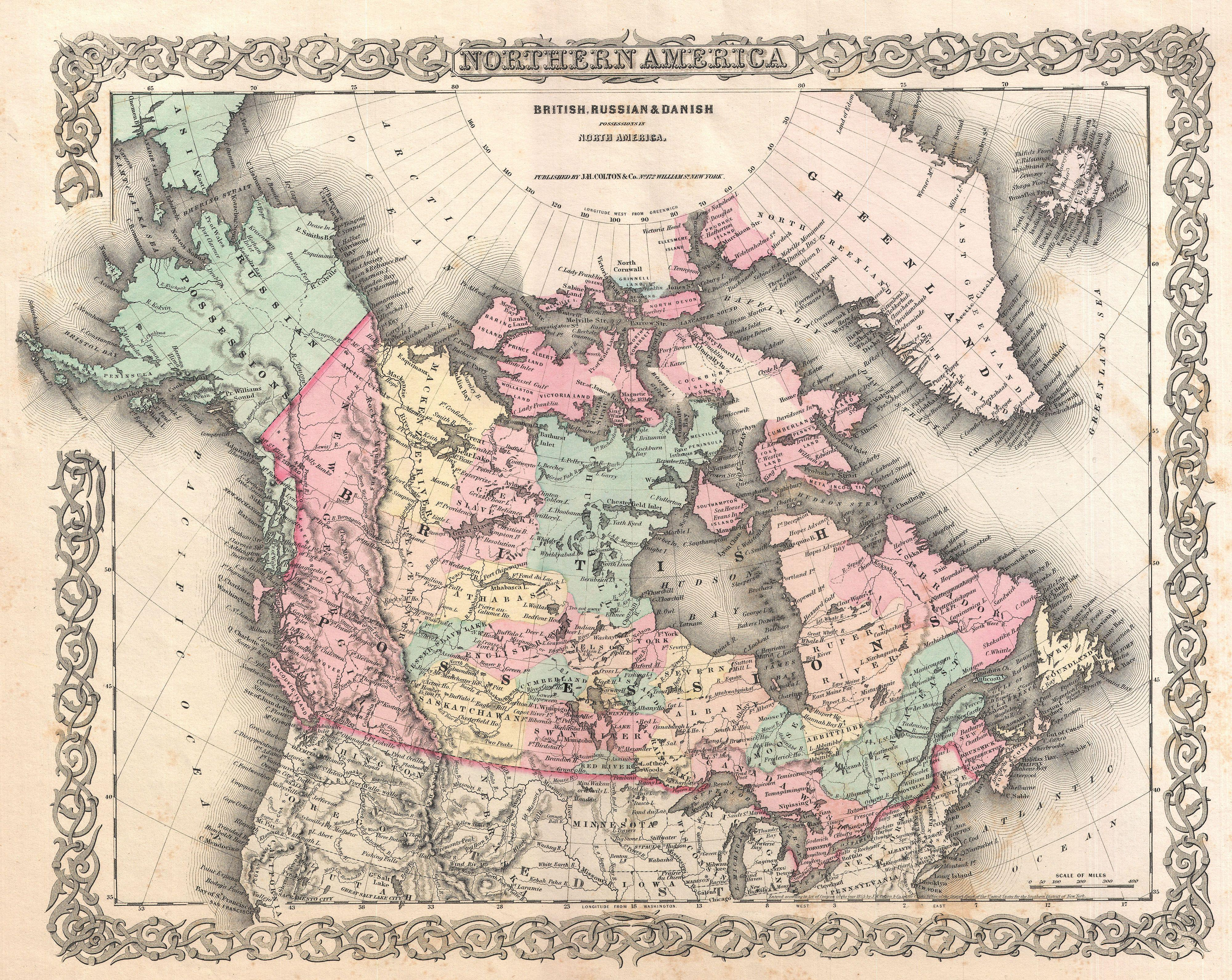
1855 map of Northern America, by Joseph Colton, showing Canada East and Canada West

The Province of Canada was divided into two parts: Canada East and Canada West. The names Upper and Lower Canada continued in popular usage and from 1849 were again defined in statute.

=== Canada East ===
Canada East was what became of the former colony of Lower Canada after being united into the Province of Canada. It would become the province of Quebec after Confederation.

=== Canada West ===
Canada West was what became of the former colony of Upper Canada after being united into the Province of Canada. It would become the province of Ontario after Confederation.

== Parliamentary system ==
=== Seat of government ===
Map of the Province of Canada from Lake Superior to the Gulf of St. Lawrence (1855)

The location of the seat of government of the Province of Canada changed six times in its 26-year history, because its elected representatives could not agree on a permanent seat of government. The first seat of government was determined by the British Governor General, Lord Sydenham, who decided that it would be in Kingston (1841–1843). The seat of government moved to Montreal (1844–1849) until rioters protested against the Rebellion Losses Bill and burned down Montreal's parliament buildings. It then moved to Toronto (1849–1851). It moved to Quebec City from 1851 to 1855, then returned to Toronto from 1855 to 1859 before returning to Quebec City from 1859 to 1865.

In 1857, Queen Victoria was asked to select a permanent seat of government. Her decision to make Ottawa as the permanent capital of the Province of Canada was announced in February 1858. The recommendation was not immediately accepted, leading to the fall and return of the Macdonald-Cartier government in the Double Shuffle in August 1858. The choice of Ottawa was implemented the following year by a close vote in the Legislative Assembly. The government subsequently initiated construction of the parliament buildings on Parliament Hill in Ottawa. The first stage of this construction was completed in 1865. The final session of the last Parliament of the Province of Canada was held in the new buildings in 1866. After Confederation in 1867, the buildings housed the Parliament of Canada.

=== Governors general ===
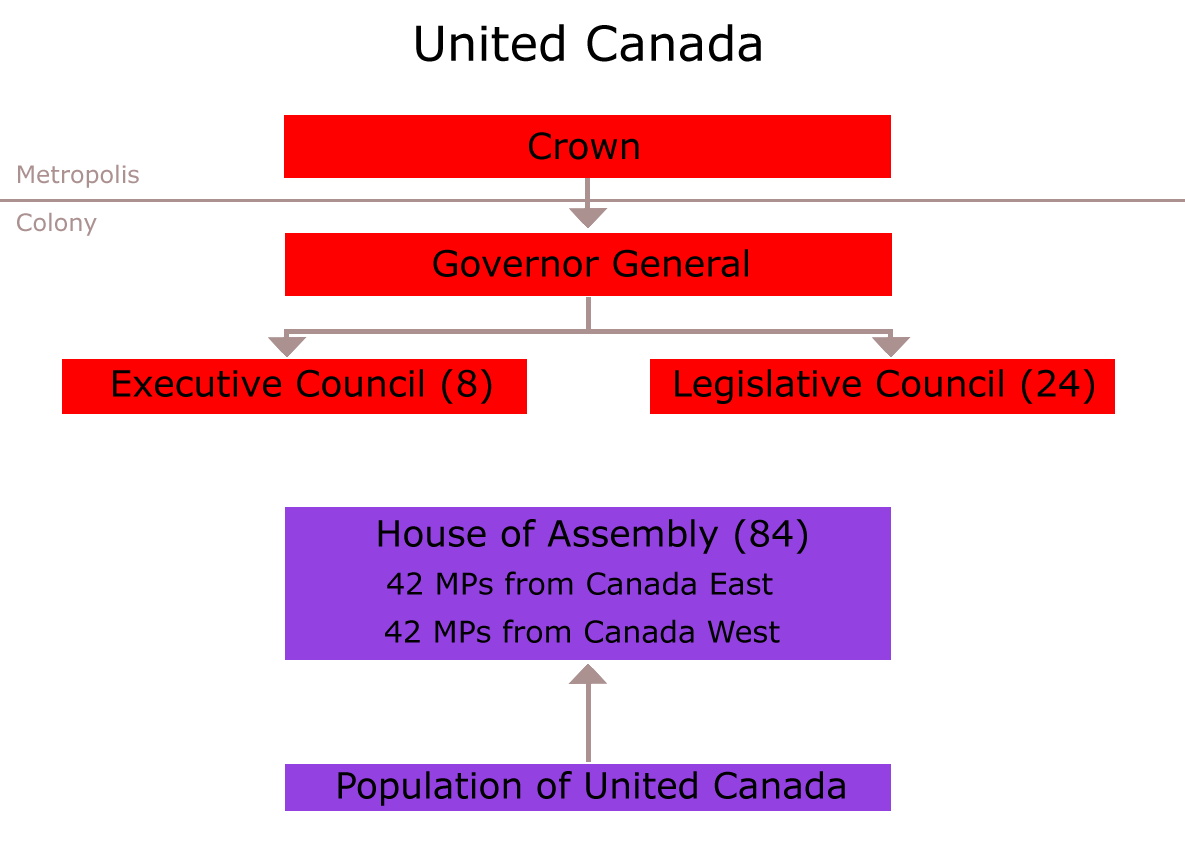
Political organization under the Act of Union, 1840

The Governor General remained the head of the civil administration of the colony, appointed by the British government, and responsible to it, not to the local legislature. He was aided by the Executive Council and the Legislative Council. The Executive Council aided in administration, and the Legislative Council reviewed legislation produced by the elected Legislative Assembly.

==== Charles Poulett Thomson, 1st Baron Sydenham (1839–1841) ====
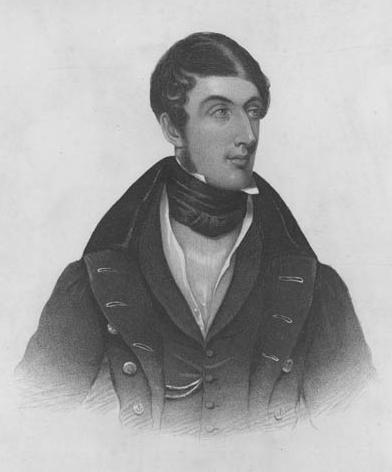
Charles Poulett Thomson

Sydenham came from a wealthy family of timber merchants, and was an expert in finance, having served on the English Board of Trade which regulated banking (including the colony). He was promised a barony if he could successfully implement the union of the Canadas, and introduce a new form of municipal government, the District Council. The aim of both exercises in state-building was to strengthen the power of the Governor General, to minimize the effect of the numerically superior French vote, and to build a "middle party" that answered to him, rather than the Family Compact or the Reformers. Sydenham was a Whig who believed in rational government, not "responsible government". To implement his plan, he used widespread electoral violence through the Orange Order. His efforts to prevent the election of Louis LaFontaine, the leader of the French reformers, were foiled by David Willson, the leader of the Children of Peace, who convinced the electors of the 4th Riding of York to transcend linguistic prejudice and elect LaFontaine in an English-speaking riding in Canada West.

==== Charles Bagot (1841–1843) ====
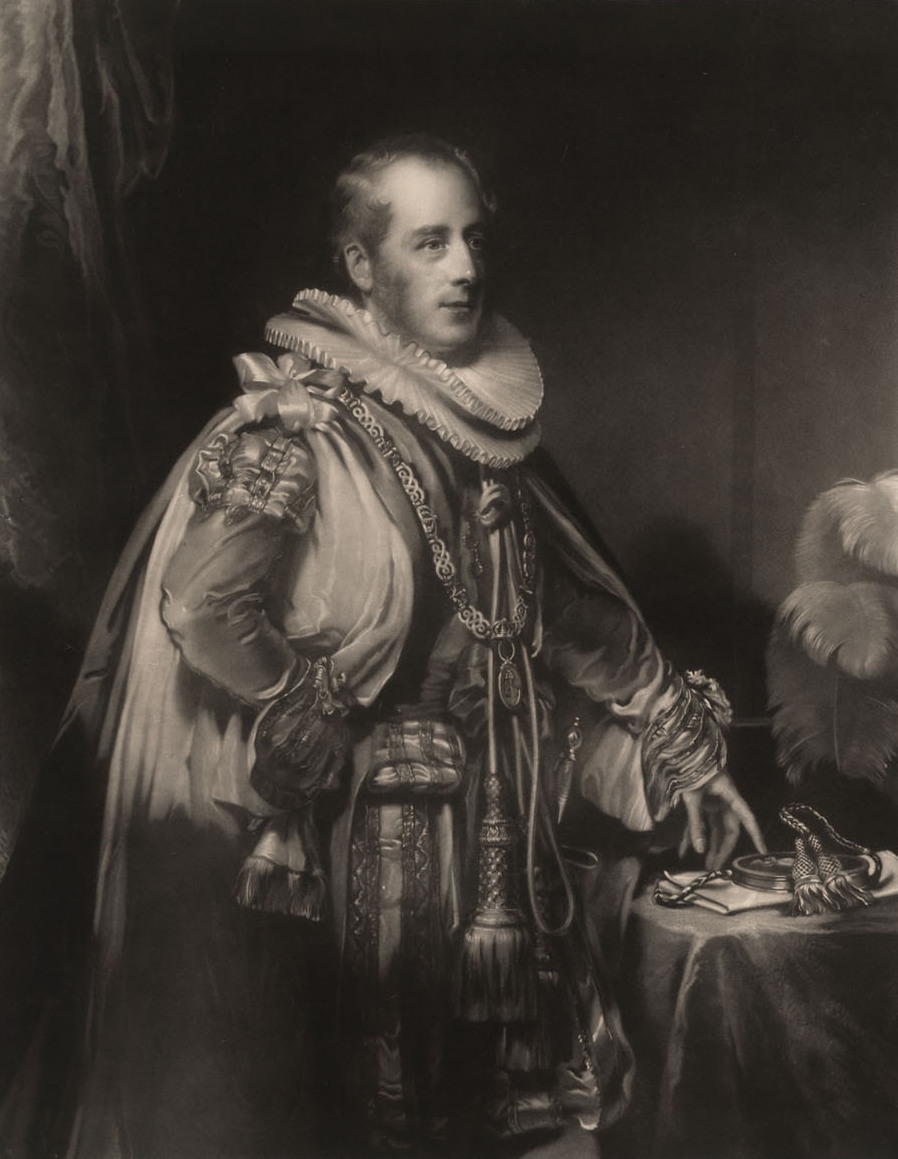
Charles Bagot

Bagot was appointed after the unexpected death of Thomson, with the explicit instructions to resist calls for responsible government. He arrived in the capital, Kingston, to find that Thomson's "middle party" had become polarized and he therefore could not form an executive. Even the Tories informed Bagot he could not form a cabinet without including LaFontaine and the French Party. LaFontaine demanded four cabinet seats, including one for Robert Baldwin. Bagot became severely ill thereafter, and Baldwin and Lafontaine became the first real premiers of the Province of Canada. However, to take office as ministers, the two had to run for re-election. While LaFontaine was easily re-elected in 4th York, Baldwin lost his seat in Hastings as a result of Orange Order violence. It was now that the pact between the two men was completely solidified, as LaFontaine arranged for Baldwin to run in Rimouski, Canada East. This was the union of the Canadas they sought, where LaFontaine overcame linguistic prejudice to gain a seat in English Canada, and Baldwin obtained his seat in French Canada.

==== Charles Metcalfe, 1st Baron Metcalfe (1843–1845) ====
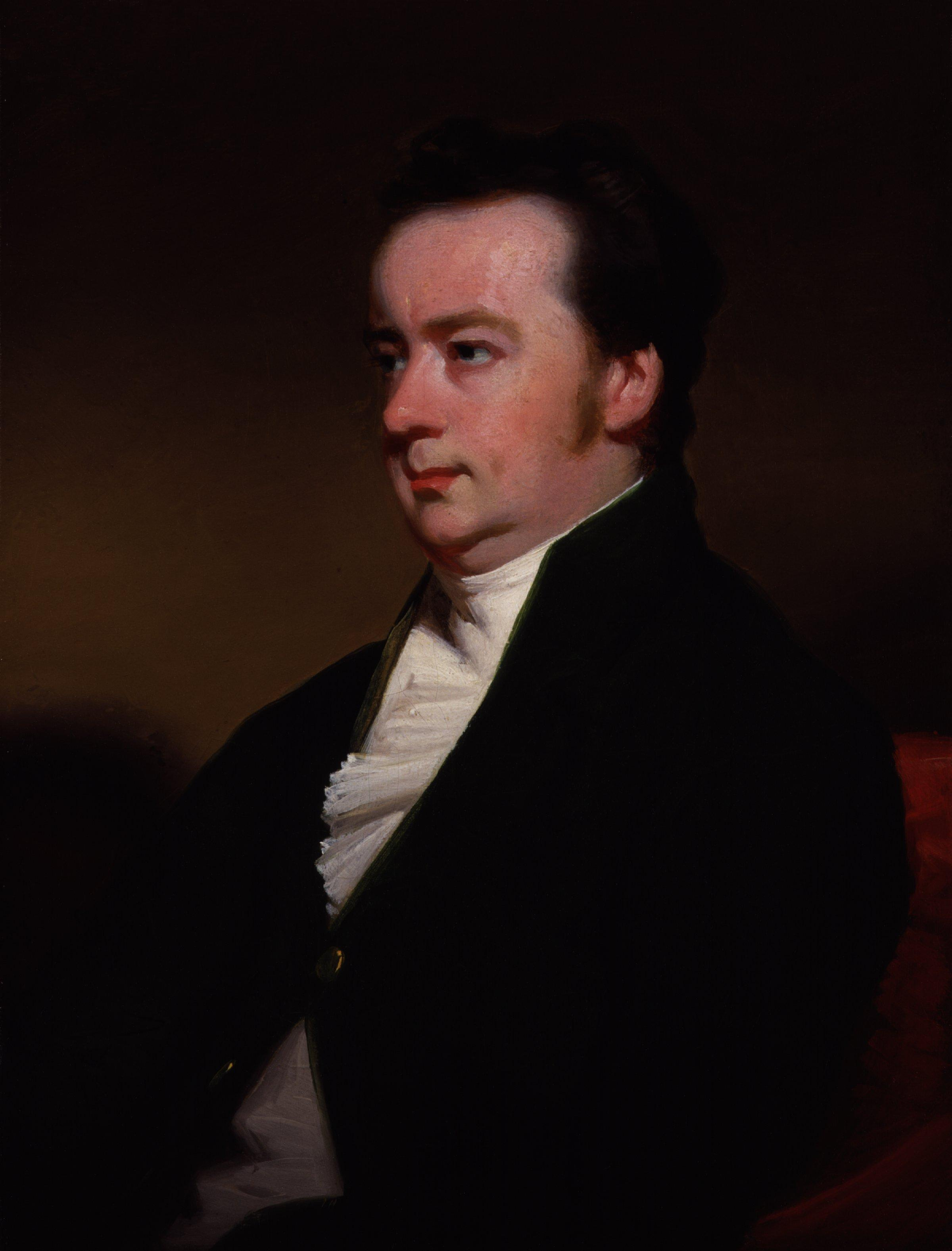
Charles Metcalfe

The Baldwin–LaFontaine ministry barely lasted six months before Governor Bagot also died in March 1843. He was replaced by Charles Metcalfe, whose instructions were to check the "radical" reform government. Metcalfe reverted to the Thomson system of strong central autocratic rule. Metcalfe began appointing his own supporters to patronage positions without Baldwin and LaFontaine's approval, as joint premiers. They resigned in November 1843, beginning a constitutional crisis that would last a year. Metcalfe refused to recall the legislature to demonstrate its irrelevance; he could rule without it. This year-long crisis, in which the legislature was prorogued, "was the final signpost on Upper Canada's conceptual road to democracy. Lacking the scale of the American Revolution, it nonetheless forced a comparable articulation and rethinking of the basics of political dialogue in the province." In the ensuing election, however, the Reformers did not win a majority and thus were not called to form another ministry. Responsible government would be delayed until after 1848.

==== Charles Cathcart, 2nd Earl Cathcart and Baron Greenock (1845–1847) ====
Cathcart had been a staff officer with Wellington in the Napoleonic Wars, and rose in rank to become commander of British forces in North America from June 1845 to May 1847. He was also appointed as Administrator then Governor General for the same period, uniting for the first time the highest Civil and military offices. The appointment of this military officer as Governor General was due to heightened tensions with the United States over the Oregon boundary dispute. Cathcart was deeply interested in the natural sciences, but ignorant of constitutional practice, and hence an unusual choice for Governor General. He refused to become involved in the day-to-day government of the conservative ministry of William Draper, thereby indirectly emphasising the need for responsible government. His primary focus was on redrafting the Militia Act of 1846. The signing of the Oregon Boundary Treaty in 1846 made him dispensable.

==== James Bruce, 8th Earl of Elgin (1847–1854) ====
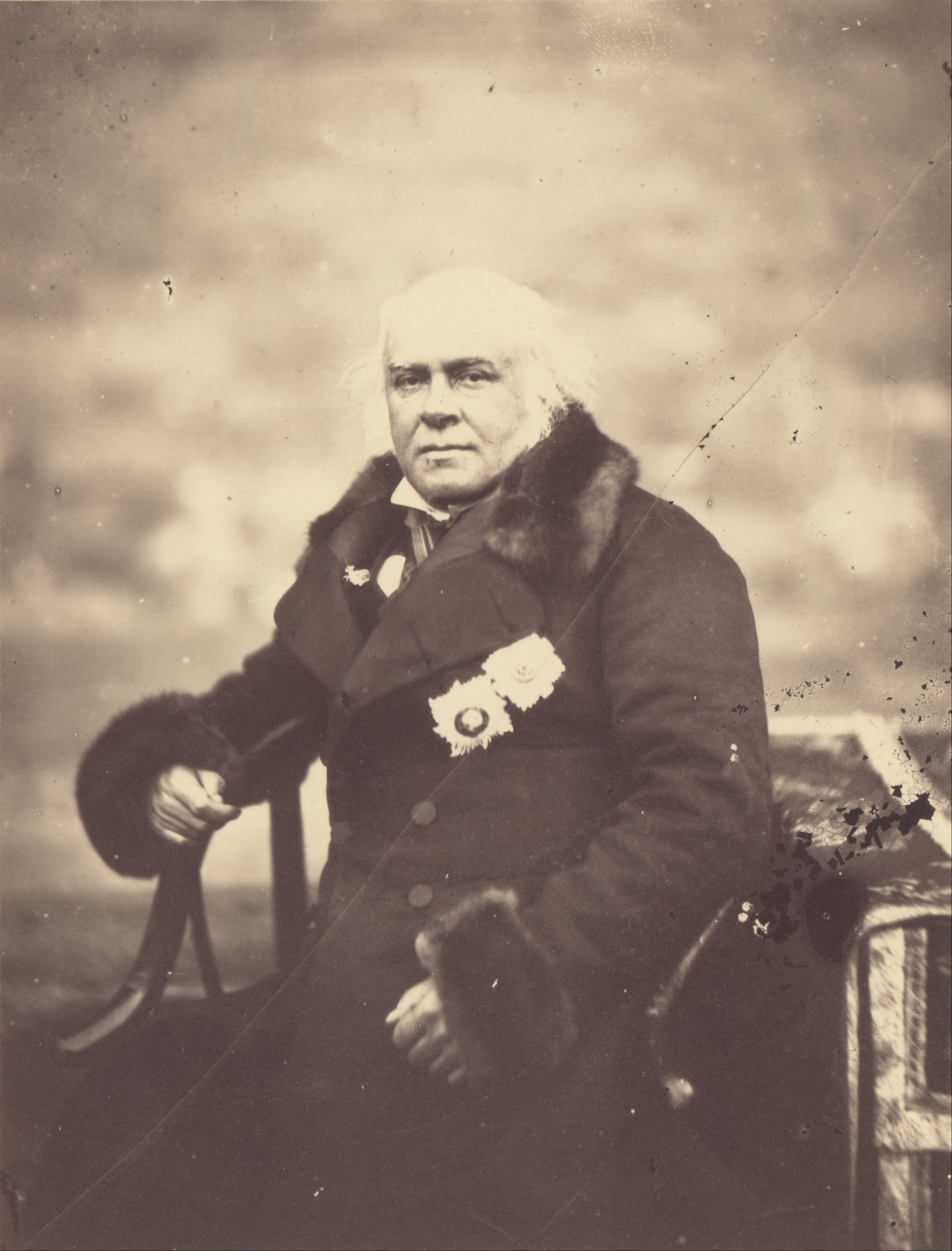
James Bruce, Lord Elgin

Elgin's second wife, Lady Mary Louisa Lambton, was the daughter of Lord Durham and niece of Lord Grey, making him an ideal compromise figure to introduce responsible government. On his arrival, the Reform Party won a decisive victory at the polls. Elgin invited LaFontaine to form the new government, the first time a Governor General requested cabinet formation on the basis of party. The party character of the ministry meant that the elected premier – and no longer the governor – would be the head of the government. The Governor General would become a more symbolic figure. The elected Premier in the Legislative Assembly would now become responsible for local administration and legislation. It also deprived the Governor of patronage appointments to the civil service, which had been the basis of Metcalfe's policy. The test of responsible government came in 1849, when the Baldwin–Lafontaine government passed the Rebellion Losses Bill, compensating French Canadians for losses suffered during the Rebellions of 1837. Lord Elgin granted royal assent to the bill despite heated Tory opposition and his own personal misgivings, sparking riots in Montreal, during which Elgin himself was assaulted by an English-speaking Orange Order mob and the Parliament buildings were burned down.

==== Edmund Walker Head, 8th Baronet (1854–1861) ====
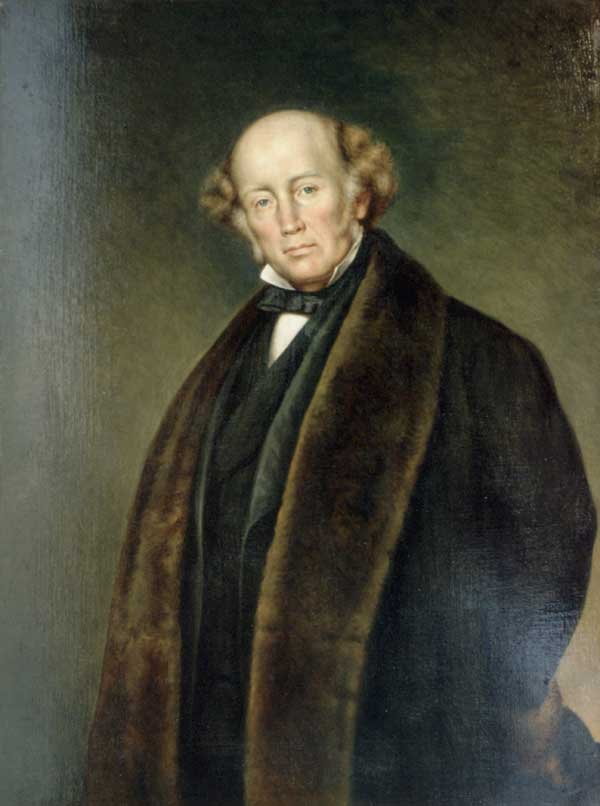
Edmund Walker Head

It was under Head, that true political party government was introduced with the Liberal-Conservative Party of John A. Macdonald and George-Étienne Cartier in 1856. It was during their ministry that the first organized moves toward Canadian Confederation took place.

==== Charles Monck, 4th Viscount Monck (1861–1868) ====
It was under Monck's governorship that the Great Coalition of all of the political parties of the two Canadas occurred in 1864. The Great Coalition was formed to end the political deadlock between predominantly French-speaking Canada East and predominantly English-speaking Canada West. The deadlock resulted from the requirement of a "double majority" to pass laws in the Legislative Assembly (i.e., a majority in both the Canada East and Canada West sections of the assembly). The removal of the deadlock resulted in three conferences that led to confederation.

=== Executive Council ===
Thomson reformed the Executive Councils of Upper and Lower Canada by introducing a "President of the Committees of Council" to act as a chief executive officer for the council and chair of the various committees. The first was Robert Baldwin Sullivan. Thomson also systematically organized the civil service into departments, the heads of which sat on the Executive Council. A further innovation was to demand that every Head of department seek election in the Legislative Assembly.

=== Legislative Council ===
The Legislative Council of the Province of Canada was the upper house. The 24 legislative councillors were originally appointed. In 1856, a bill was passed to replace the process of appointing members by a process of electing members. Members were to be elected from 24 divisions in each of Canada East and Canada West. Twelve members were elected every two years from 1856 to 1862. Members previously appointed were not required to relinquish their seats.

=== Legislative Assembly ===
Elections to the Legislative Assembly of the Province of Canada (1841–1863) – seats won by party
| Year | 1841 | | | 1844 | | | 1848 | | | 1851 | | | 1854 | | | 1858 | | | 1861 | | | 1863 | | |
| Year | CW | CE | Total | CW | CE | Total | CW | CE | Total | CW | CE | Total | CW | CE | Total | CW | CE | Total | CW | CE | Total | CW | CE | Total |
|---|---|---|---|---|---|---|---|---|---|---|---|---|---|---|---|---|---|---|---|---|---|---|---|---|
| Reform | 29 | | 29 | 12 | | 12 | 23 | | 23 | 20 | | 20 | 19 | | 19 | | | | | | | | | |
| Clear Grits | | | | | | | | | | | | | 14 | | 14 | | | | | | | | | |
| Radical Reform | | | | | | | | | | | | | 6 | | 6 | | | | | | | | | |
| Moderate Reform | | | | | | | | | | | | | | | | 5 | | 5 | 6 | | 6 | 2 | | 2 |
| Patriote | | 21 | 21 | | 23 | 23 | | 23 | 23 | | | | | | | | | | | | | | | |
| Rouges | | | | | | | | | | | 4 | 4 | | 19 | 19 | | 10 | 10 | | | | | | |
| Liberal | | | | | 5 | 5 | | 9 | 9 | | 9 | 9 | | | | 34 | 5 | 39 | 29 | 29 | 58 | 39 | 25 | 64 |
| Family Compact | 10 | | 10 | | | | | | | | | | | | | | | | | | | | | |
| Tory | | 17 | 17 | 28 | 13 | 41 | 18 | 6 | 24 | 20 | 3 | 23 | | | | | | | | | | | | |
| Ministerialist | | | | | | | | | | | 23 | 23 | | 35 | 35 | | | | | | | | | |
| Bleus | | | | | | | | | | | | | | | | | 33 | 33 | | 27 | 27 | | 25 | 25 |
| Liberal-Conservative | | | | | | | | | | | | | 25 | 9 | 34 | 24 | 15 | 39 | 29 | 8 | 37 | 24 | 11 | 35 |
| Independent | 3 | 4 | 7 | 2 | 1 | 3 | 1 | 4 | 5 | 1 | 4 | 5 | 1 | 2 | 3 | 2 | 2 | 4 | 2 | 1 | 3 | | 4 | 4 |
| Total | 42 | 42 | 84 | 42 | 42 | 84 | 42 | 42 | 84 | 42 | 42 | 84 | 65 | 65 | 130 | 65 | 65 | 130 | 65 | 65 | 130 | 65 | 65 | 130 |

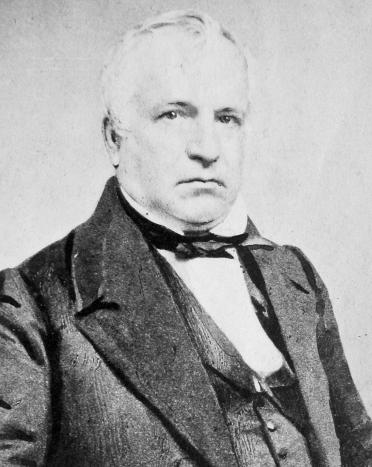
Louis-Hippolyte Lafontaine, father of responsible government

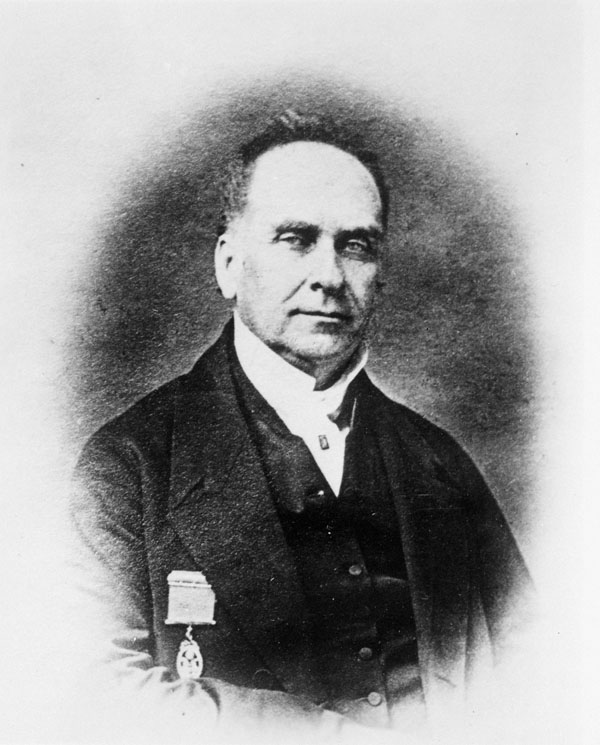
Robert Baldwin, father of responsible government

Canada West, with its 450,000 inhabitants, was represented by 42 seats in the Legislative Assembly, the same number as the more populated Canada East, with 650,000 inhabitants.

Each administration was led by two men, one from each half of the province. Officially, one of them at any given time had the title of Premier, while the other had the title of Deputy.

=== District councils ===
Municipal government in Upper Canada was under the control of appointed magistrates who sat in Courts of Quarter Sessions to administer the law within a District. A few cities, such as Toronto, were incorporated by special acts of the legislature. Governor Thomson, 1st Baron Sydenham, spearheaded the passage of the District Councils Act which transferred municipal government to District Councils. His bill allowed for two elected councillors from each township, but the warden, clerk and treasurer were to be appointed by the government. This thus allowed for strong administrative control and continued government patronage appointments. Sydenham's bill reflected his larger concerns to limit popular participation under the tutelage of a strong executive. The Councils were reformed by the Baldwin Act in 1849 which made municipal government truly democratic rather than an extension of central control of the Crown. It delegated authority to municipal governments so they could raise taxes and enact by-laws. It also established a hierarchy of types of municipal governments, starting at the top with cities and continued down past towns, villages and finally townships. This system was to prevail for the next 150 years.

== Political parties ==
=== Reform Association of Canada ===
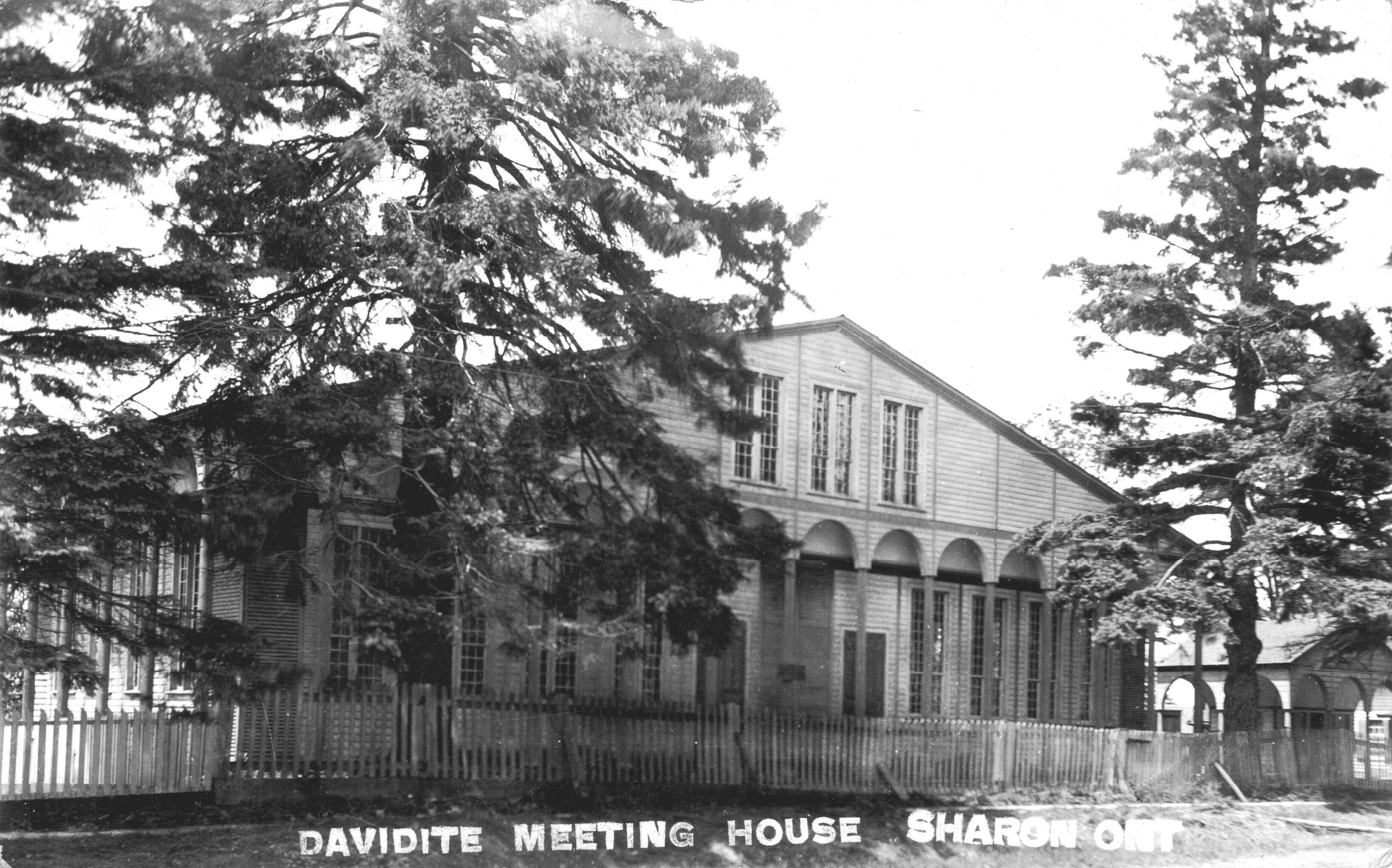
The Second Meeting House, Sharon, where the Reform Association met in June 1844

During the year-long constitutional crisis in 1843–44, when Metcalfe prorogued Parliament to demonstrate its irrelevance, Baldwin established a "Reform Association" in February 1844, to unite the Reform movement in Canada West and to explain their understanding of responsible government. Twenty-two branches were established. A grand meeting of all branches of the Reform Association was held in the Second Meeting House of the Children of Peace in Sharon. Over three thousand people attended this rally for Baldwin. the Association was not, however, a true political party and individual members voted independently.

=== Parti rouge ===
The Parti rouge (alternatively known as the Parti démocratique) was formed in Canada East around 1848 by radical French Canadians inspired by the ideas of Louis-Joseph Papineau, the Institut canadien de Montréal, and the reformist movement led by the Parti patriote of the 1830s. The reformist rouges did not believe that the 1840 Act of Union had truly granted a responsible government to former Upper and Lower Canada. They advocated important democratic reforms, republicanism, separation of the state and the church. In 1858, the elected rouges allied with the Clear Grits. This resulted in the shortest-lived government in Canadian history, falling in less than a day.

=== Clear Grits ===
The Clear Grits were the inheritors of William Lyon Mackenzie's Reform movement of the 1830s. Their support was concentrated among southwestern Canada West farmers, who were frustrated and disillusioned by the 1849 Reform government of Robert Baldwin and Louis-Hippolyte Lafontaine's lack of democratic enthusiasm. The Clear Grits advocated universal male suffrage, representation by population, democratic institutions, reductions in government expenditure, abolition of the Clergy reserves, voluntarism, and free trade with the United States. Their platform was similar to that of the British Chartists. The Clear Grits and the Parti rouge evolved into the Liberal Party of Canada.

=== Parti bleu ===
The Parti bleu was a moderate political group in Canada East that emerged in 1854. It was based on the moderate reformist views of Louis-Hippolyte Lafontaine.

=== Liberal-Conservative Party ===
The Liberal-Conservative Party emerged from a coalition government in 1854 in which moderate Reformers and Conservatives from Canada West joined with bleus from Canada East under the dual prime-ministership of Allan MacNab and A.-N. Morin. The new ministry were committed to secularize the Clergy reserves in Canada West and to abolish seigneurial tenure in Canada East. Over time, the Liberal-Conservatives evolved into the Conservative party.

== Effects of responsible government ==
No provision for responsible government was included in the Act of Union 1840. Early Governors of the province were closely involved in political affairs, maintaining a right to make Executive Council and other appointments without the input of the legislative assembly.

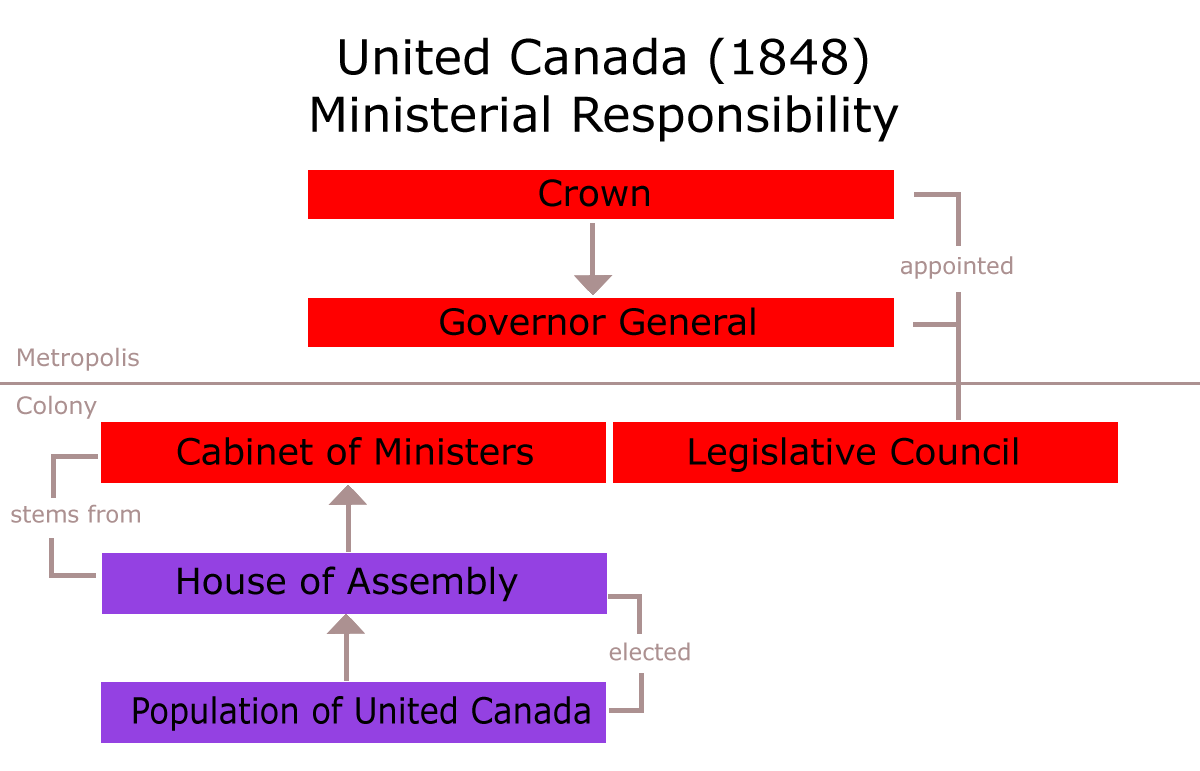
Political organisation under the Union Act (1848)

However, in 1848 the Earl of Elgin, then Governor General, appointed a Cabinet nominated by the majority party of the Legislative Assembly, the Baldwin–Lafontaine coalition that had won elections in January. Lord Elgin upheld the principles of responsible government by not repealing the Rebellion Losses Bill, which was highly unpopular with some English-speaking Loyalists who favoured imperial over majority rule.

As Canada East and Canada West each held 42 seats in the Legislative Assembly, there was a legislative deadlock between English (mainly from Canada West) and French (mainly from Canada East). The majority of the province was French, which demanded "rep-by-pop" (representation by population), which the Anglophones opposed.

The granting of responsible government to the colony is typically attributed to reforms in 1848 (principally the effective transfer of control over patronage from the Governor to the elected ministry). These reforms resulted in the appointment of the second Baldwin–Lafontaine government that quickly removed many of the disabilities on French-Canadian political participation in the colony.

Once the English population, rapidly growing through immigration, exceeded the French, the English demanded representation-by-population. In the end, the legislative deadlock between English and French led to a movement for a federal union which resulted in the broader Canadian Confederation in 1867.

== Legislative initiatives ==
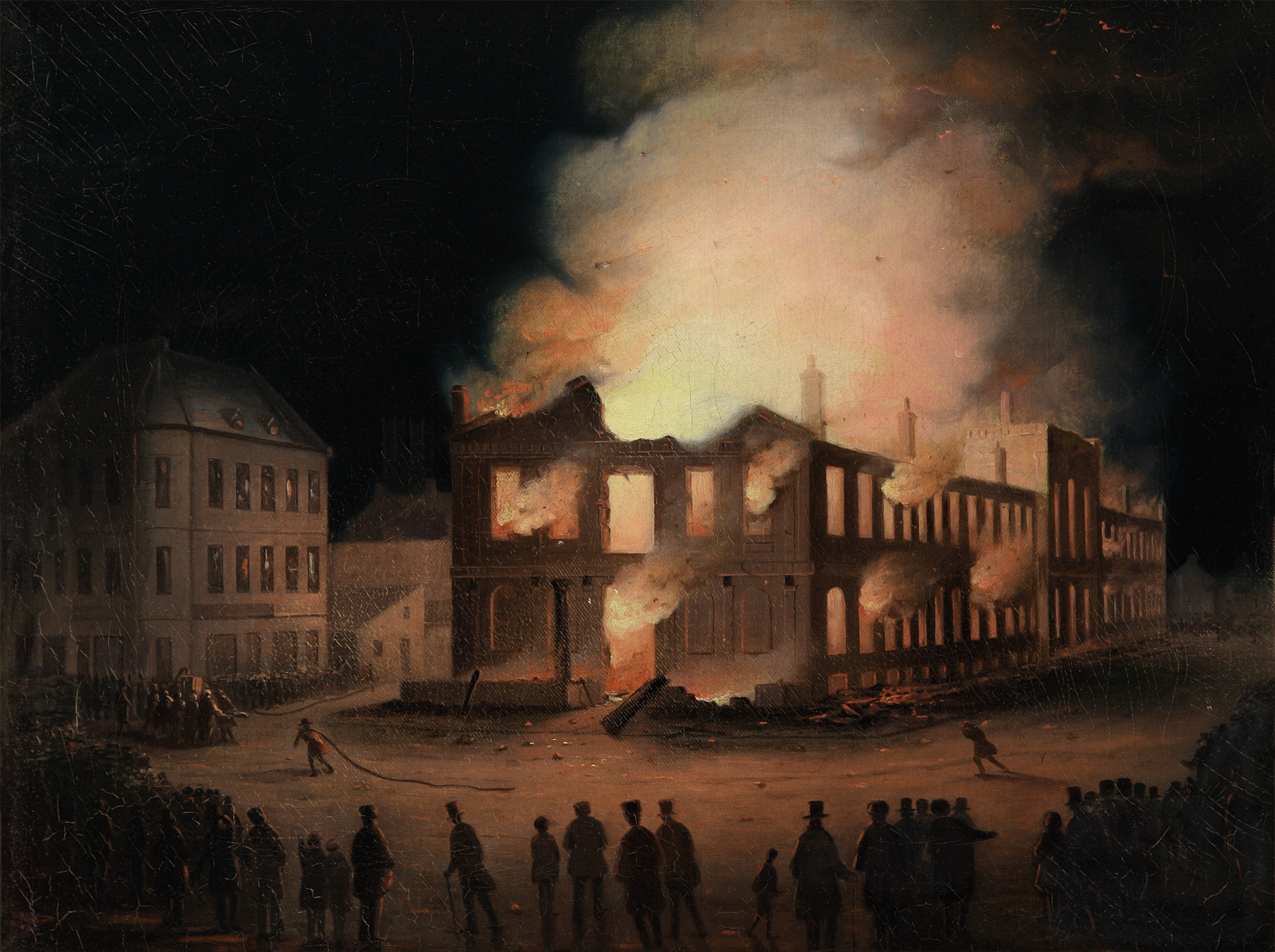
Burning of the Parliament Buildings, Montreal, 1849

The Baldwin Act 1849, also known as the Municipal Corporations Act, replaced the local government system based on district councils in Canada West by government at the county level. It also granted more autonomy to townships, villages, towns and cities.

Despite the controversy, the government compensated landowners in the Rebellion Losses Bill of 1849 for the actions during the Rebellion.

The Canadian–American Reciprocity Treaty of 1854, also known as the Elgin–Marcy Treaty, was a trade treaty between the United Province of Canada and the United States. It covered raw materials and was in effect from 1854 to 1865. It represented a move toward free trade.

Education in Canada West was regulated by the province through the General Board of Education from 1846 until 1850, when it was replaced by the Department of Public Instruction, which lasted until 1876. The province improved the educational system in Canada West under Egerton Ryerson.

French was reinstated as an official language of the Legislature and the Courts by amending Article 41 of the Act of Union 1840, in 1848.

The Legislature also codified the Civil Code of Lower Canada in 1866, and abolished the seigneurial system in Canada East.

In 1849, King's College was renamed the University of Toronto and the school's ties with the Church of England were severed.

The Grand Trunk Railway was incorporated by the Legislature in the 1850s. Exploration of Western Canada and Rupert's Land with a view to annexation and settlement was a priority of Canada West politicians in the 1850s leading to the Palliser Expedition and the Red River Expedition of Henry Youle Hind, George Gladman and Simon James Dawson.

In 1857, the Legislature introduced the Gradual Civilization Act, putting into law the principle that Indigenous persons should become British subjects and discard their Indian status, in exchange for a grant of land.

== Population ==
| Year | Population (Upper) Canada West | Population (Lower) Canada East |
|---|---|---|
| 1841 | 455,688 | n/a |
| 1844 | n/a | 697,084 |
| 1848 | 725,879 | 765,797–786,693 estimates |
| 1851–52 | 952,004 | 890,261 |
| 1860–61 | 1,396,091 | 1,111,566 |

== See also ==
=== Political history ===
- History of Canada (1763–1867)
- List of elections in the Province of Canada
- List of by-elections in the Province of Canada

=== Political structure ===
- List of governors general of Canada
- Joint premiers of the Province of Canada
- Legislative Assembly of the Province of Canada
- Speaker of the Legislative Assembly of the Province of Canada
- Commissioner of Crown Lands (Province of Canada)
- Postmasters General of the Province of Canada
