= Skirving =

Skirving is a surname. Notable people with the surname include:

- Adam Skirving (1719–1803), Scottish songwriter
- Alexander Skirving (1868–1935), trade union secretary and politician
- Angie Skirving (born 1981), Australian hockey player
- Archibald Skirving (1749–1819), Scottish portrait painter
- Ben Skirving (born 1983), English rugby player
- Catherine Seaton Skirving (née Ewart, 1818–1897), Canadian philanthropist and volunteer
- Imogen Skirving (1937–2016), British hotelier
- John Skirving Ewart (1849–1933), Canadian lawyer
- Robert Skirving, bishop of the Episcopal Diocese of East Carolina, US
- William Skirving (c. 1745–1796) activist, one of the five Scottish Martyrs for Liberty
