= List of postmasters general for the Province of Canada =

The Postmaster General for the Province of Canada was a member of the Executive Council for the Province of Canada responsible for the operation of the mail service. From 1784 to 1850, Deputy Postmasters General were appointed in the Canadian colonies, subordinate to the Postmaster General of the United Kingdom. On July 28, 1849, the British Parliament passed An Act for Enabling Colonial Legislatures to Establish Inland Posts. Legislation was passed in the Province of Canada in 1850 to regulate the operation of the postal service. The official transfer was completed in 1851. After Canadian Confederation in 1867, this function was transferred to the new federal government. In the Province of Canada, the Postmaster General also automatically became a member of the Board of Railway Commissioners.

== Deputy Postmaster for British North America (Canada) ==
Before 1851, the role of Deputy Postmaster General was the highest rank, whom reported back to the Postmaster General of the Royal Mail.

=== Deputy Postmaster General of the Province of Quebec ===
- Hugh Finlay 1763-1774
  - co-Postmaster General for British North America with John Foxcroft 1774-1783

=== Deputy Postmaster General of the Canadas, New Brunswick, Nova Scotia ===
- Hugh Finlay
  - 1783-1799 - as Postmaster General for Upper and Lower Canada
  - 1788-1799 Postmaster General for Nova Scotia and New Brunswick
- George Heriot 1799-1816
- Daniel Sutherland 1816-1827
- Thomas Allen Stayner 1828-1851
- William Henry Griffin 1851

=== Deputy Postmaster General of New Brunswick and Nova Scotia ===
- John Howe 1843-1867 - for New Brunswick

== Postmaster General of the Province of Canada ==
This post covered only Canada West and Canada East, as New Brunswick and Nova Scotia had their own postal system.

1. James Morris, April 1851 – August 1853
2. Malcolm Cameron, August 1853 – July 1854
3. Robert Spence, October 1854 – 1857
4. Sidney Smith, February 1858 – August 1858
5. Michael Hamilton Foley, August 1858
6. Sir John A. Macdonald, August 1858
  Sidney Smith (second time), September 1858 – May 1862
  Michael Hamilton Foley (second time), May 1862 – May 1863
7. Oliver Mowat, May 1863 – March 1864
  Michael Hamilton Foley (third time), March 1864 – May 1864
8. Oliver Mowat (second time), June 1864 – November 1864
9. William Pearce Howland, November 1864 – August 1866
10. Hector-Louis Langevin, November 1866 – 1867

== See also ==
- Postmaster General of Canada
