= Oliver Mowat =

Canadian lawyer and Father of Confederation (1820–1903)

The Honourable Sir Oliver Mowat PC GCMG KC
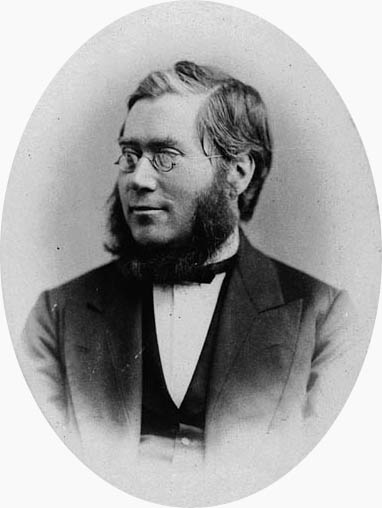
- Portrait as premier in 1873

8th Lieutenant Governor of Ontario
- In office November 18, 1897 – April 19, 1903
- Monarchs: Victoria; Edward VII
- Governors General: The Earl of Aberdeen; The Earl of Minto
- Premier: Arthur Sturgis Hardy; George William Ross
- Preceded by: Sir Casimir Gzowski (acting)
- Succeeded by: William Mortimer Clark

3rd Premier of Ontario
- In office October 25, 1872 – July 12, 1896
- Monarch: Victoria
- Lieutenant Governor: William Pearce Howland; John Willoughby Crawford; Donald A. Macdonald; John Beverley Robinson; Alexander Campbell; George Airey Kirkpatrick
- Preceded by: Edward Blake
- Succeeded by: Arthur Hardy

11th Minister of Justice Attorney General of Canada
- In office July 13, 1896 – November 17, 1897
- Prime Minister: Wilfrid Laurier
- Preceded by: Arthur Rupert Dickey
- Succeeded by: David Mills
Parliamentary offices
Leader of the Government in the Senate
In office August 19, 1896 – November 17, 1897
Prime Minister	Wilfrid Laurier
Preceded by	Sir Mackenzie Bowell
Succeeded by	David Mills
Canadian Senator from Ontario
In office July 12, 1896 – November 17, 1897
Nominated by	Wilfrid Laurier
Preceded by	John Ferguson
Succeeded by	William Kerr
Member of Provincial Parliament for Oxford North
In office November 29, 1872 – July 14, 1896
Preceded by	George Perry
Succeeded by	Andrew Pattulo

Personal details
- Born: July 25, 1820 Kingston, Upper Canada
- Died: April 19, 1903 (aged 82) Toronto, Ontario, Canada
- Resting place: Mount Pleasant Cemetery, Toronto
- Party: Ontario Liberal Party
- Spouse: Jane Ewart

Sir Oliver Mowat GCMG PC KC (July 22, 1820 – April 19, 1903) was a Canadian lawyer, politician, and Ontario Liberal Party leader. He served for nearly 24 years as the third premier of Ontario. He was the eighth lieutenant governor of Ontario and one of the Fathers of Confederation. He is best known for defending successfully the constitutional rights of the provinces in the face of the centralizing tendency of the national government as represented by his longtime Conservative adversary, John A. Macdonald. This longevity and power was due to his manoeuvring to build a political base around Liberals, Catholics, trade unions, and anti-French-Canadian sentiment.

== Early years ==
Mowat was born in Kingston, Upper Canada (now Ontario), to John Mowat and Helen Levack, Scottish Presbyterians who both emigrated from Caithness, Scotland. As a youth, he had taken up arms with the loyalists during the Upper Canada Rebellion of 1837, which suggested a conservative inclination in politics. But he instead joined the Reformers.

== Marriage, family, and legal success ==
Mowat was called to the bar of Upper Canada on November 5, 1841. In 1846, he married Jane Ewart, a daughter of John Ewart of Toronto. Mowat and his wife had three sons and four daughters. In 1856 Mowat was appointed Queen's Counsel.

He was known to be a tenacious legal practitioner, with two of his cases being upheld by the Judicial Committee of the Privy Council. In the 1858 case Bowes v. City of Toronto, John George Bowes (previously mayor of Toronto) was successfully sued for recovery of the share of the profit he was suspected to have made in collaboration with co-premier Francis Hincks out of a speculation in city debentures. Afterwards, Mowat admitted, "I cannot speak with much force unless I have an opponent, and things are said by others which I do not altogether coincide with."

== Political career before Confederation ==
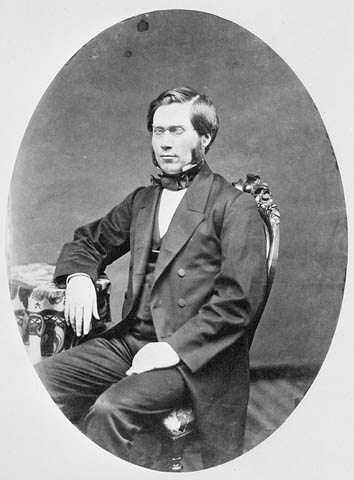
In the 1850s

Mowat first entered politics as an alderman of the City of Toronto in 1857. From there, he became a member of the Legislative Assembly of the Province of Canada for South Ontario. As a member of the Assembly from 1858 to 1867, he was closely associated with George Brown. Mowat served as Provincial Secretary (1858) and Postmaster-General (1863–1864) in the pre-Confederation governments of George Brown and John Sandfield Macdonald for the Liberal Party of Canada.

Mowat was a member of the Great Coalition government of 1864 and was a representative at that year's Quebec Conference, where he helped work out the division of powers between the federal and provincial governments. On November 14, 1864, he was appointed to the judiciary as Vice-Chancellor of the Court of Chancery of Upper Canada, He held this position until he was appointed premier on October 25, 1872. One of the more notable cases during his time on the Court was Dickson v Burnham in 1868, whose underlying jurisprudence would be altered during his later time as Premier, with the passage of the Rivers and Streams Act, 1884.

== Premier and Attorney-General of Ontario ==
Mowat served as provincial member for the riding of Oxford North, about 150 km west of Toronto, for his entire term as premier.

As premier in the 1880s a series of disputes with the Dominion arose over Provincial boundaries, jurisdiction over liquor licenses, trade and commerce, rivers and streams, timber, escheats, and other matters. In 1890, it was said:

The attacks made on Provincial Rights he has succeeded in repelling. Not a single case remains unfinished; not a single case did he lose.

These court battles resulted in a weakening of the power of the federal government in provincial matters. Although Macdonald had dismissed him as "Blake's jackal", Mowat's battles with the federal government greatly decentralized Canada, giving the provinces far more power than Macdonald had intended.

He also served as his own Attorney-General concurrently with his service as Premier, and introduced reforms such as the secret ballot in elections, and the extension of suffrage beyond property owners. He also extended laws regulating liquor and consolidated the laws relating to the municipal level of government. His policies, particularly regarding liquor regulation and separate schools, routinely drew criticism from political conservatives, including the Orange Lodge and its associated newspaper, The Sentinel.

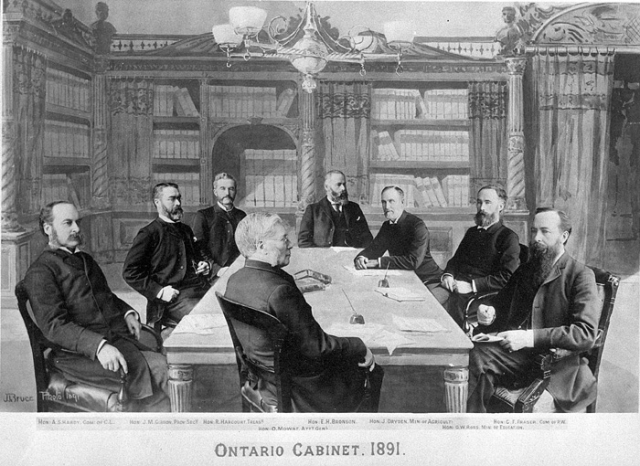
With the Ontario Cabinet in 1891. Clockwise starting at centre foreground: O. Mowat, A. S. Hardy, J. M. Gibson, R. Harcourt, E.H. Bronson, J. Dryden, G. W. Ross and C. F. Fraser.

The boundary between Ontario and Manitoba became a hotly contested matter, with the federal government attempting to extend Manitoba's jurisdiction eastward to the Great Lakes, into the areas that Ontario claimed. In 1882, Premier Mowat threatened to pull Ontario from Confederation over the issue. Mowat sent police into the disputed territory to assert Ontario's claims, while Manitoba (at the behest of the national government) did the same. The Judicial Committee of the Privy Council in Britain, serving as Canada's highest appeal court, repeatedly issued rulings taking the side of provincial rights. These decisions would to some extent neutralize the power of the central government, creating a more decentralized federation. John Ibbitson writes that by 1914:

Confederation had evolved into a creation beyond John A. Macdonald's worst nightmare. Powerful, independent provinces, sovereign within their own spheres, manipulated the rights of property, levied their own taxes—even income taxes, in a few cases—exploited their natural resources, and managed schools, hospitals, and relief for the poor, while a weak and ineffectual central government presided over not much of anything in the drab little capital on the banks of the Ottawa.

George William Ross praised Mowat's ability to read the public mind, and John Stephen Willison remarked that his political genius rose from "the fact that for so long he had a generous support from the liquor interest and a still more generous support from Prohibitionists".

His government was moderate and attempted to cut across divisions in the province between Roman Catholics and Protestants as well as between country and city. He also oversaw the northward expansion of Ontario's boundaries and the development of its natural resources, as well as the emergence of the province into the economic powerhouse of Canada.

Mowat's nearly 24 years as premier of Ontario remains the longest consecutive service by any premier in Ontario history, and is the third longest by any premier in Canada, behind only George Henry Murray of Nova Scotia and Ernest Manning of Alberta.

Mowat was notoriously hostile to aboriginal and treaty rights. In 1884, when the federal government urged that Ontario transfer to the Teme-Augama Anishnabai Indigenous people all or some of the 2,770 square miles (7,200 km^{2}) as a reserve, for which that band's head chief, Ignace Tonené, had campaigned with the federal authorities for many years, Mowat blocked the land transfer, primarily concerned about the value of the red and white pine lumber at the location. It was not until 1943 that lands were finally set aside for the Temagami, and the official creation of their Bear Island Reserve did not occur until 1971.

== Federal level ==
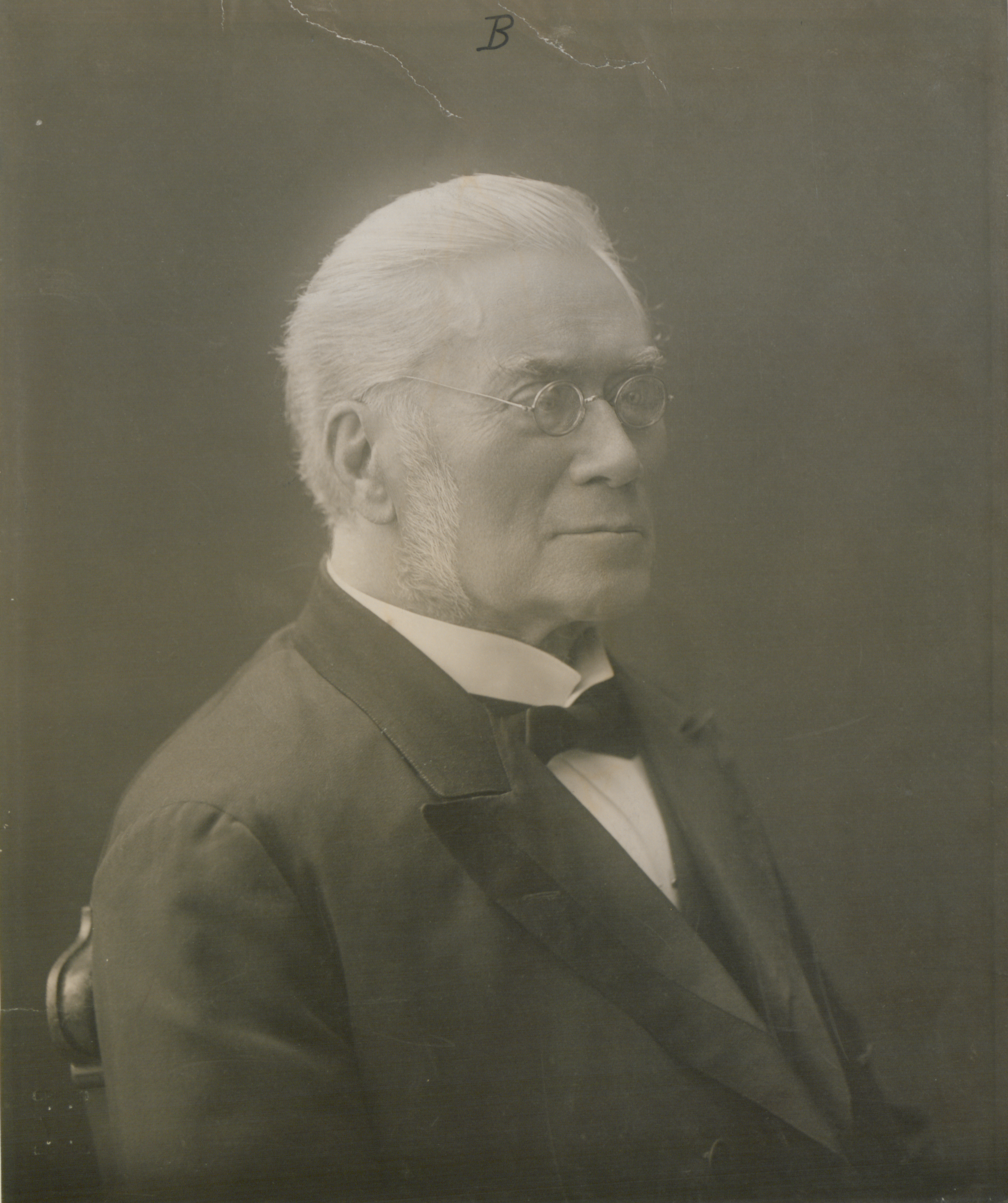
As Lieutenant-Governor in 1902

In 1896, the leader of the opposition, Wilfrid Laurier, convinced Mowat to enter federal politics. It was thought that the combination of a French Canadian (Laurier) and the prestige of Oliver Mowat in Ontario would be a winning ticket for the Liberal party. The slogan was "Laurier, Mowat and Victory". Victory was won, and Mowat became Minister of Justice and Senator.

In 1897, he was appointed the eighth Lieutenant Governor of Ontario and served until his death in office in 1903. He is buried in Mount Pleasant Cemetery, Toronto.

== Macdonald and Mowat in power ==
The two former Kingston law partners, Macdonald as prime minister in Ottawa and Mowat as premier in Toronto, led their respective governments concurrently for nearly 14 years straight. Mowat was premier for just under 24 years, the longest for any premier of Ontario.

== Family ==
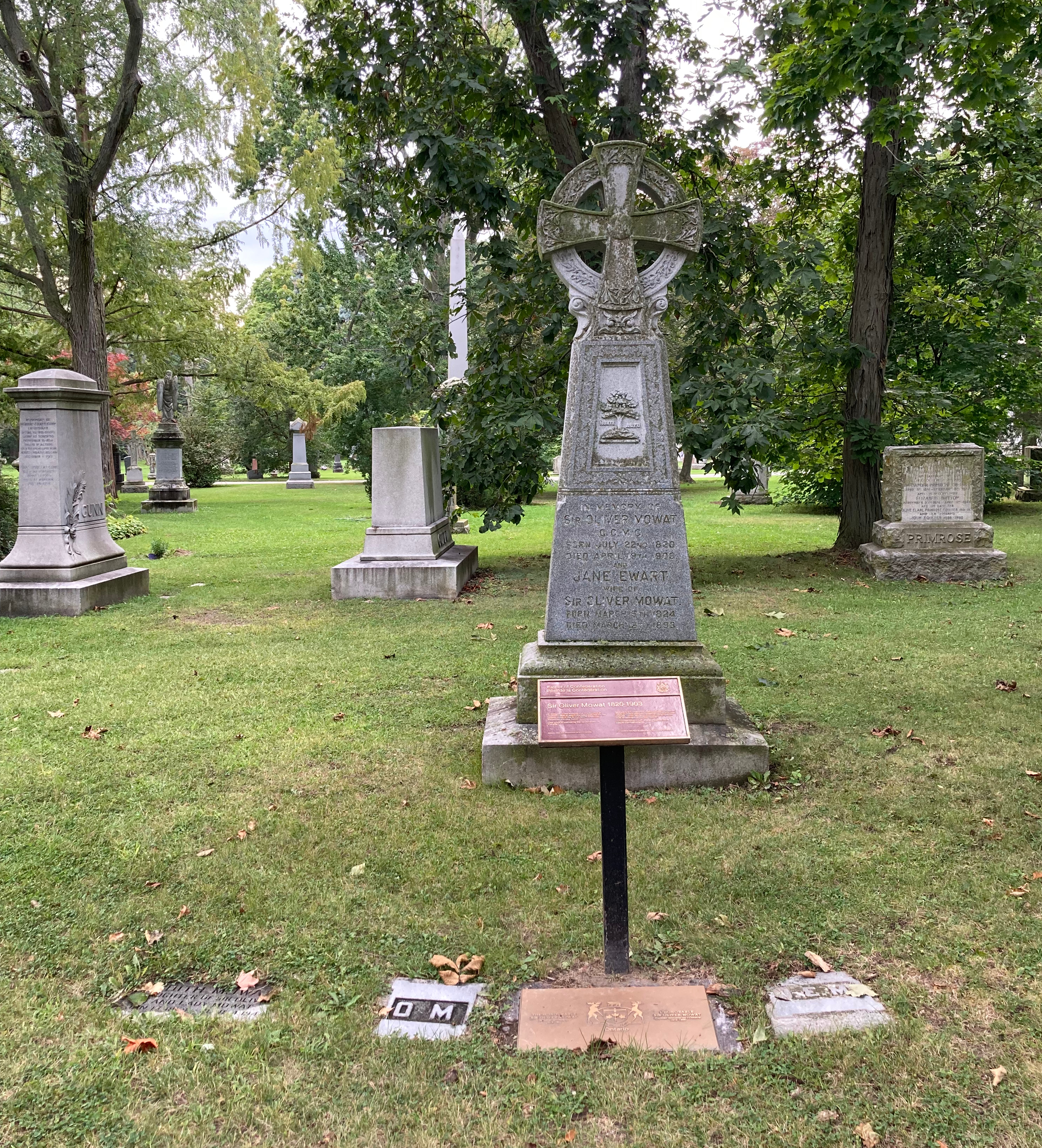
Mowat's grave at Mount Pleasant Cemetery

Mowat's daughter, Jane Helen Mowat, married Charles Robert Webster Biggar, who wrote a two-volume biography of Mowat in 1905. Their son Oliver Mowat Biggar became Canada's first Chief Electoral Officer. Sir Oliver Mowat's son Frederick Mowat was the father-in-law of the diabetologist Andrew Almon Fletcher.

Sir Oliver Mowat was also the great-granduncle of the Canadian author Farley Mowat, the son of Angus Mowat, a Canadian librarian who served in the Battle of Vimy Ridge.

== Other achievements ==
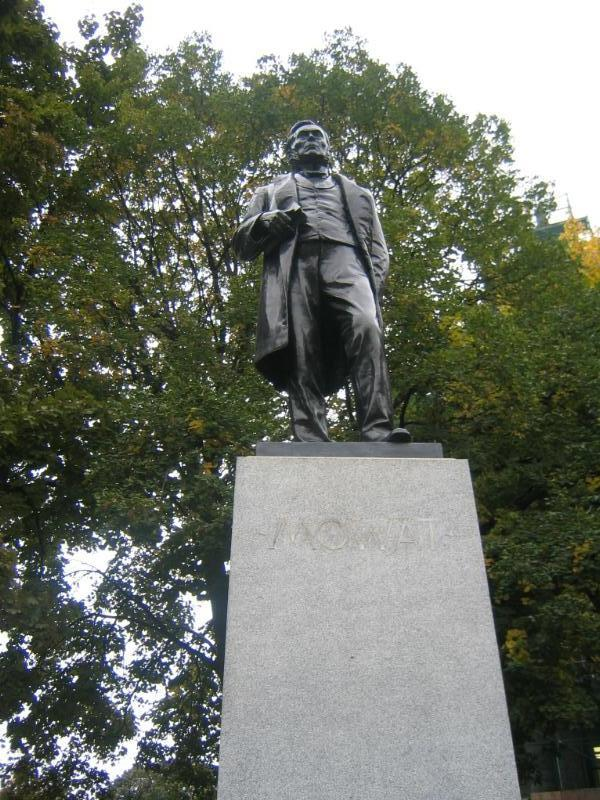
Walter Seymour Allward's statue of Oliver Mowat on the lawn of Queen's Park in Toronto, Ontario Canada

Mowat was knighted in 1892, increasing his importance in Canada.

Mowat was himself the author of two small books in the field of Christian apologetics:

- Mowat, Oliver (1890). Christianity and Some of Its Evidences: An Address. Toronto: Williamson & Co. ISBN 9780665112959.
- Mowat, Oliver (1898). Christianity and Its Influence. Toronto: Hunter Rose. ISBN 9780665112942.

Mowat also documented his government's first 18 years of Ontario government (from 1872 to 1890) in an 1890 book.

== Legacy ==
After his death, Wilfrid Laurier placed Mowat's policy of sectarian tolerance second in historical importance only to his role in giving Confederation its character as a federal compact. He credited Mowat with giving Ontario "a Government which can be cited as a model for all Governments: a Government which was honest, progressive, courageous, and tolerant".

By nature a secretive individual, he left instructions in his will that resulted in the destruction of nearly all his papers.

Mowat is honoured by a statue in Queen's Park. Mowat Avenue in Kingston is named in his honour.

Mowat is the inspiration for the naming of The Mowat Centre, an independent Canadian public policy think tank associated with the School of Public Policy & Governance at the University of Toronto.

The Sir Oliver Mowat Collegiate Institute in Toronto was named in his honour.

Queen's University organized a two-day historical colloquium in 1970 to celebrate the 150th anniversary of Mowat's birth.

Mowat was portrayed by David Onley (the 28th Lieutenant-Governor of Ontario) in the Canadian TV series Murdoch Mysteries in 2013 in the episode "The Ghost of Queen's Park."

Mowat was portrayed by Kingston actor Patrick Downes, in 2015, in Kingston-based Salon Theatre's stage productions featuring the life of John A. Macdonald, staged during the Bicentennial celebrations of Macdonald's birth.

The building where Mowat and Macdonald practiced law together in the 1830s, on the east side of Wellington Street between Princess and Brock streets in Kingston, was renovated, restored, and expanded, from 2014 to 2018, but has had its heritage elements preserved, insofar as possible, under direction from Kingston City Council. The building reopened as the "Kensington" in 2018, and now features, on its street level, an alley portraying historical and heritage aspects of its past, along with the Macdonald-Mowat relationship.

Public offices, Province of Canada (pre-confederation)
Legislative Assembly of the Province of Canada
Preceded by John McVeagh Lumsden	Member for South Ontario; 1858–1864	Succeeded by Thomas Nicholson Gibbs
Sandfield Macdonald—Dorion ministry, United Province of Canada (1863-64)
Preceded by Michael Hamilton Foley	Postmaster General; May 1863 – March 1864	Succeeded by Michael Hamilton Foley
Great Coalition, United Province of Canada (1864-67)
Preceded by Michael Hamilton Foley	Postmaster General; June – November 1864	Succeeded by William Pearce Howland
Court offices
Preceded by James Christie Palmer Esten	Vice-Chancellor, Court of Chancery; 1864–1872; Served alongside: John Godfrey Spragge (1850–1869); Samuel Henry Strong (1869–1874)	Succeeded by Samuel Hume Blake
Public & political offices, Province of Ontario
Preceded by Edward Blake	Premier of Ontario; 1872–1896	Succeeded by Arthur Sturgis Hardy
Preceded by Adam Crooks	Attorney General; 1872–1896	Succeeded by Arthur Sturgis Hardy
Preceded by Edward Blake	Leader, Ontario Liberal Party; 1872–1896	Succeeded by Arthur Sturgis Hardy
Preceded by Sir Casimir Gzowski (interim)	Lieutenant Governor; 1897–1903	Succeeded by William Mortimer Clark
Legislative Assembly of Ontario
Preceded by George Perry	Member for Oxford North; 1872–1896	Succeeded by Andrew Pattulo
Public offices, Dominion of Canada
8th Canadian Ministry (1896–1911) – Cabinet of Wilfrid Laurier
Preceded by Mackenzie Bowell	Leader of the Government in the Senate; 1896–1897	Succeeded by David Mills
Preceded by Arthur Rupert Dickey	Minister of Justice & Attorney General; 1896–1897	Succeeded by David Mills
Parliament of Canada
Preceded by John Ferguson	Senator for Ontario; 1896–1897	Succeeded by William Kerr
Other offices
Professional and academic associations
Preceded by William Henry Draper	President of the Royal Canadian Institute; 1864–1866	Succeeded by Henry Holmes Croft
