= David Munroe Ross =

Canadian politician from Ontario

Member of the Ontario Provincial Parliament for Oxford North
- In office December 19, 1921 – April 3, 1934
- Preceded by: John Alexander Calder
- Succeeded by: Constituency abolished

Personal details
- Party: Liberal-Progressive (after 1926)
- Other political affiliations: United Farmers of Ontario (until 1926)

David Munroe Ross was a Canadian politician from Ontario. He represented Oxford North in the Legislative Assembly of Ontario from 1921 to 1934.

== See also ==
- List of United Farmers/Labour MLAs in the Ontario legislature
- 15th Parliament of Ontario
- 16th Parliament of Ontario
- 17th Parliament of Ontario
- 18th Parliament of Ontario
