= Court of Chancery of Upper Canada =

Court in Upper Canada

The Court of Chancery of Upper Canada was a court of equity in Upper Canada. It was established in 1837.

The idea of introducing a court of equity in the province had been around since at least 1801, when Henry Allcock suggested it. On Allcock's model, Peter Hunter—then the province's lieutenant governor—would be the chancellor and a master of the rolls would also be named. Allcock's proposal did not come to fruition: Hunter died and Allcock was named the chief justice of Lower Canada before the new court could be created. Various proposals were floated and also failed between 1801 and 1836.

On March 4, 1837, the parliament of Upper Canada finally created the Court of Chancery of Upper Canada by the Chancery Act, 1837. The statute provided the court would "have jurisdiction, and possess the like power and authority as by the laws of England are possessed by the Court of Chancery in England, in respect of the matters hereinafter enumerated". Its jurisdiction included claims for alimony, but not divorce.

A commission, comprised in part of James Christie Palmer Esten, William Hume Blake, and Robert Easton Burns, studied the court's operations from 1843 to 1845. Its recommendations, which suggested simplifying the court's procedures, were largely adopted by a statute passed on June 10, 1857.

The court—by then a court of Ontario—was incorporated as a division of a new Supreme Court of Judicature by the Judicature Act, 1881.

== Sources ==
- Chambers, Anne Lorene (1997). Married women and property law in Victorian Ontario. Osgoode Society for Canadian Legal History. University of Toronto Press. ISBN 978-1-4426-7709-8. OCLC 288075209.
- Brown, Elizabeth (1983). "Equitable Jurisdiction and the Court of Chancery in Upper Canada". Osgoode Hall Law Journal. 21 (2): 275–314.
- Falconbridge, John Delatre (November 1914). "Law and Equity in Upper Canada". University of Pennsylvania Law Review and American Law Register. 63 (1): 1–21. doi:10.2307/3313228. JSTOR 3313228. Archived from the original on October 8, 2014.
