= Osgoode Hall =

Building in Toronto

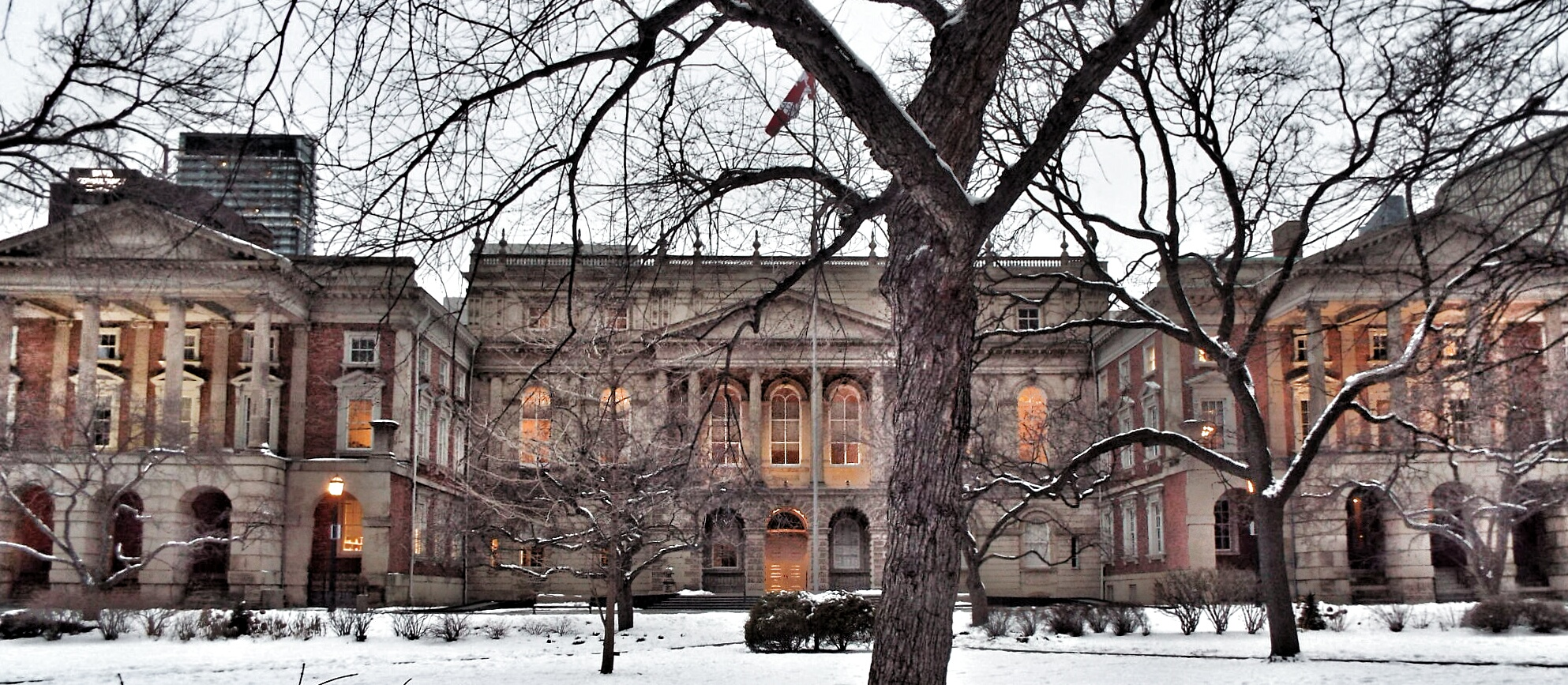
- Osgoode Hall was designed in a late-Palladian style.
- Interactive map of the Osgoode Hall area

General information
- Status: Completed
- Type: Office building and courthouse
- Architectural style: Palladian, Neoclassical
- Location: 130 Queen Street West, Toronto, Ontario, Canada
- Coordinates: 43°39′08″N 79°23′08″W
- Current tenants: Law Society of Ontario; Ontario Court of Appeal; Ontario Superior Court of Justice
- Named for: William Osgoode
- Construction started: 1829
- Completed: 1832
- Owner: Law Society of Ontario &; Government of Ontario

Technical details
- Floor count: 3
- Grounds: 6 acres (2.4 ha)

Design and construction
- Architects: John Ewart and William Warren Baldwin

Other information
- Public transit: Osgoode station

National Historic Site of Canada
- Designated: 1979

Ontario Heritage Act
- Designated: 1990

Osgoode Hall is a landmark building in downtown Toronto, Ontario, Canada. The original 2 1/2-storey building was started in 1829 and finished in 1832 from a design by John Ewart and William Warren Baldwin. The structure is named for William Osgoode, the first Chief Justice of Upper Canada (now the province of Ontario).

It originally served to house the regulatory body for lawyers in Ontario along with its law school, formally established as Osgoode Hall Law School in 1889, which was the only recognized professional law school for the province at the time. The original building was constructed between 1829 and 1832 in the late Georgian Palladian and Neoclassical styles. It currently houses the Ontario Court of Appeal, the Divisional Court of the Superior Court of Justice, the offices of the Law Society of Ontario and the Great Library of the Law Society.

== History ==
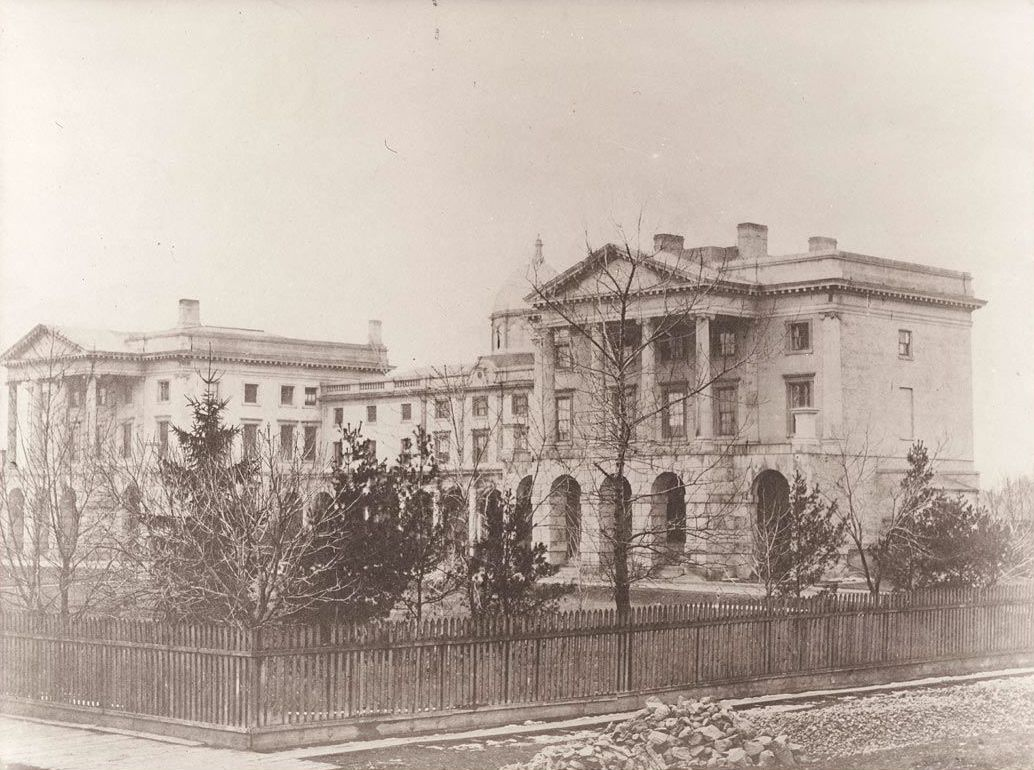
Osgoode Hall in 1856; the building was expanded from 1855 to 1857.

The 6-acre (2.4 ha) site at the corner of Lot Street (Queen Street West today) and College Avenue (University Avenue today) was acquired by the Law Society in 1828. At the time, the location was on the northwest edge of the city, which has since grown around the building. It was originally bounded on its north side by Osgoode Street, and on its east side by a street that would eventually be known as Chestnut Street. The former no longer exists, and the latter now stops at Armoury Street, as Nathan Phillips Square now lies to the east. The portico of Osgoode Hall's east wing was built at the head of Toronto's York Street to serve as a terminating vista, though it is now obscured by trees planted on the building's lawn. Osgoode Hall, together from which the Osgoode Hall Law School (affiliated as a professional school at York University), received its name in honour of William Osgoode, which was lent in turn to the adjacent Osgoode subway station.

Between the rebellions taking place in 1837-8 until 1843, the hall was used as troop barracks. When the Law Society regained possession in 1844, an expansion was designed by Henry Bowyer Lane; the West Wing and Library were built, with two domes (later removed) over the library to connect the two wings. In 1846, the Law Society entered into an agreement with the government to house the province's Superior Court at the hall. Today, the building is jointly owned by the Law Society and the Government of Ontario.

From 1855 to 1857, the building was refurbished and enlarged again, according to a design by the firm Cumberland and Storm, to accommodate courts with the original 1829 building becoming the east wing. From 1880 to 1891, the building was again expanded twice in order to accommodate its law school.

The building was designated a National Historic Site of Canada in 1979, and by the City of Toronto under the Ontario Heritage Act in 1990.

== Design ==
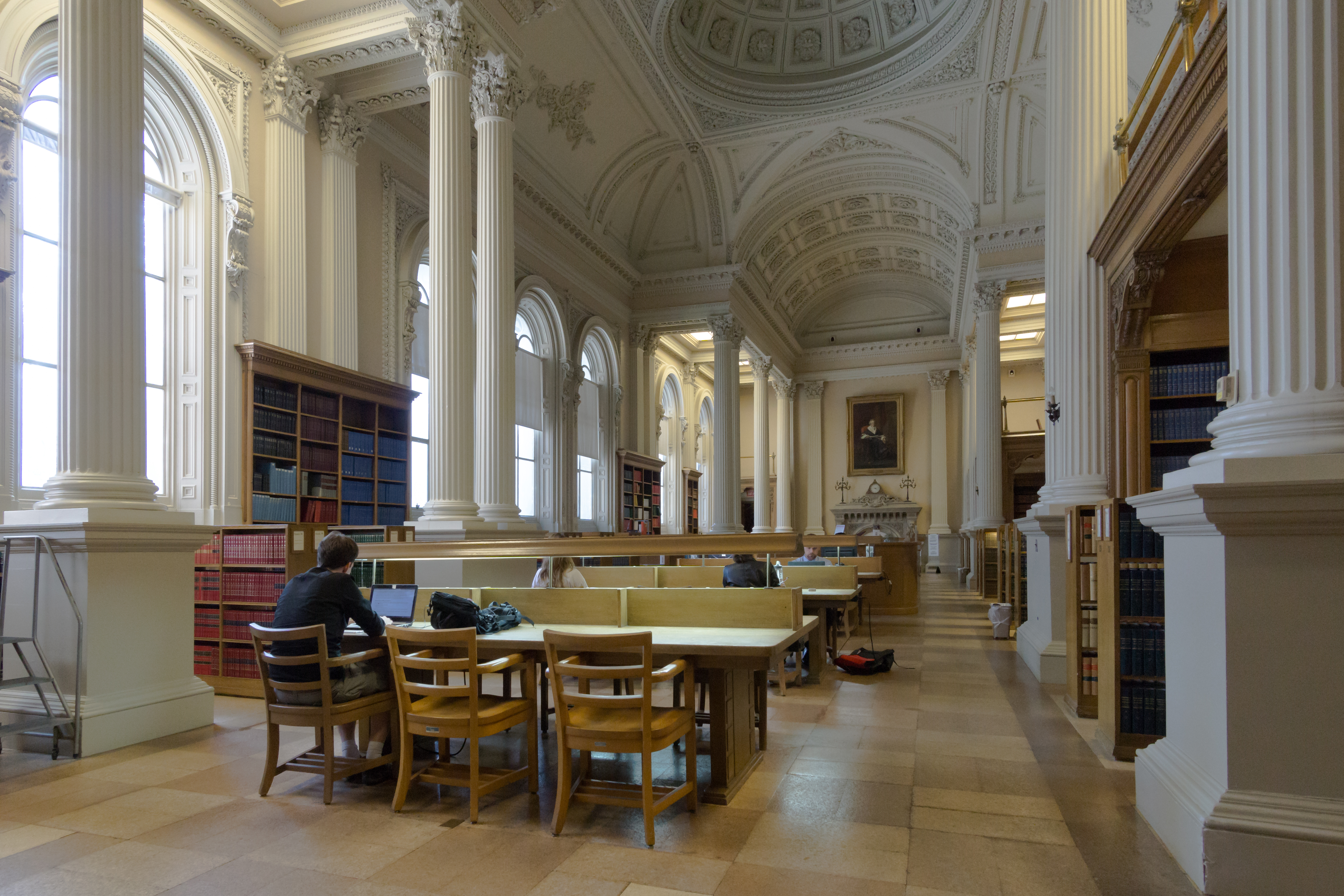
Great Library was designed by Cumberland and Storm

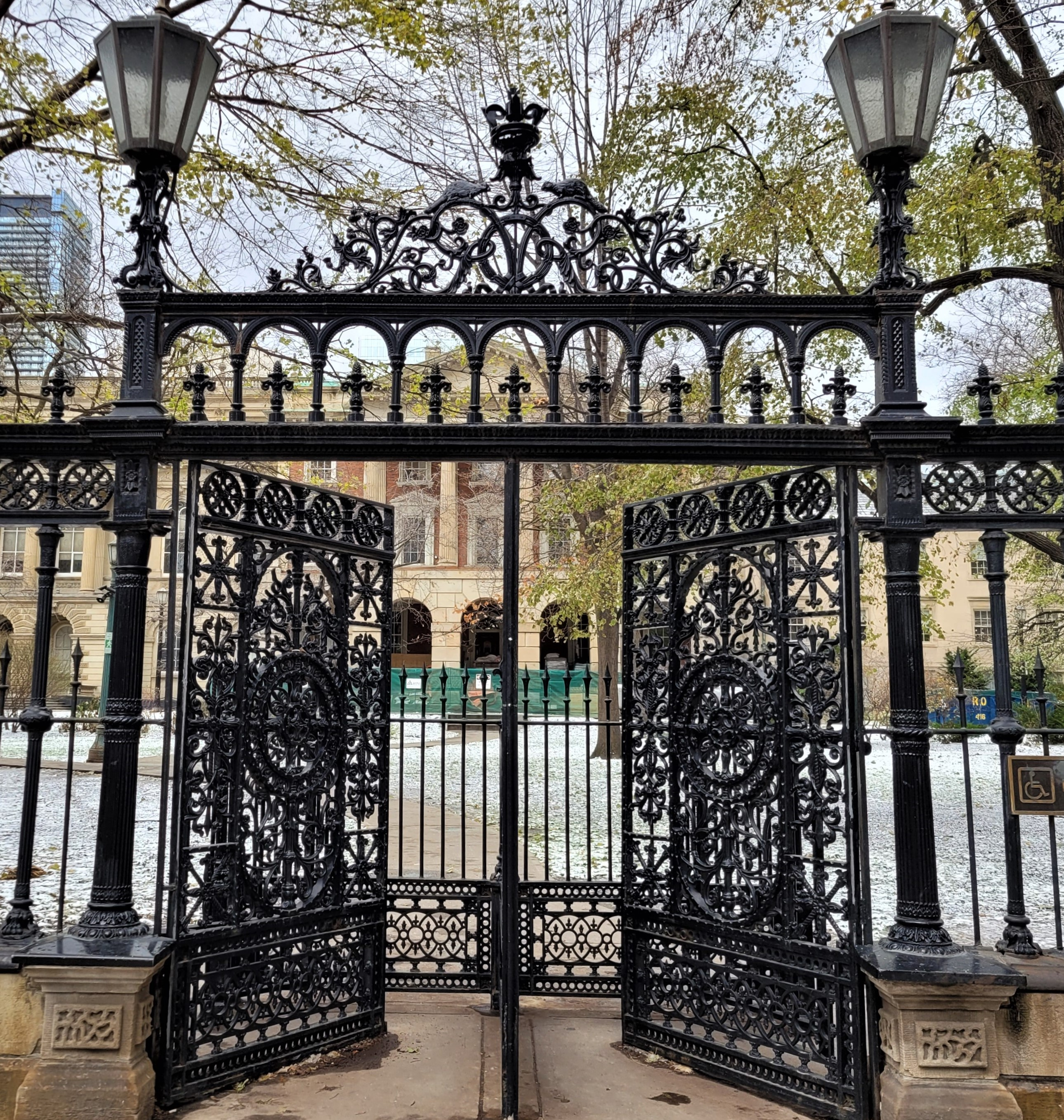
The iron gates of Osgoode Hall

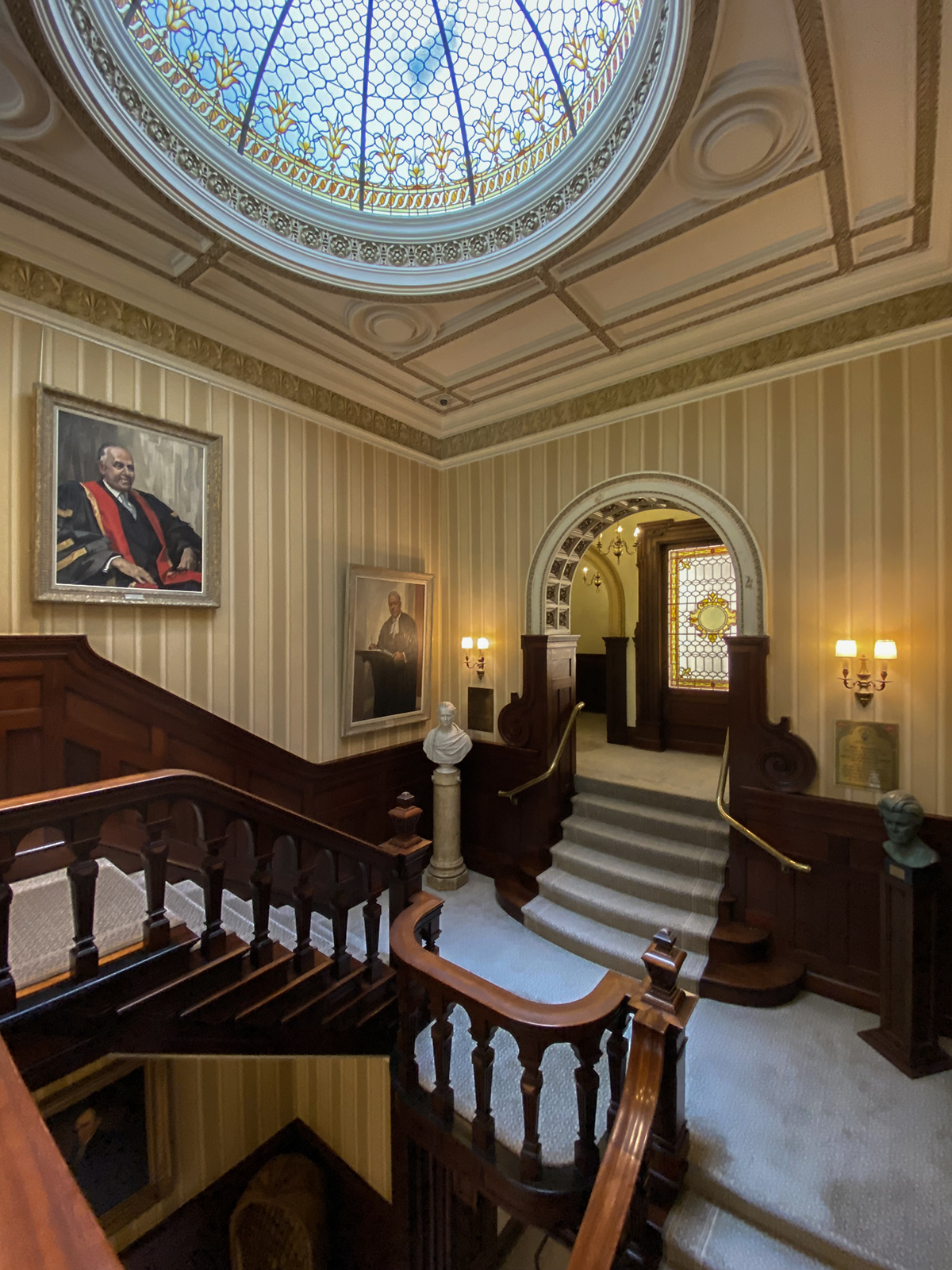
Stairs for the members

Despite the expansions, the hall presents a unified design in the late Palladian style. The iron fence surrounding the lawns of Osgoode Hall has become a landmark in itself. Its distinctive iron gates are narrow and restrictive; it is a long-standing myth that they were designed to keep livestock out of the grounds of the hall. Despite this, an incident in the 1950s occurred in which students unsuccessfully attempted to pass a cow through one of the gates. The gates were likely due to Victorian architectural fashion, rather than wandering cattle.

Two libraries are housed within Osgoode Hall: the Great Library of the Law Society of Ontario and a smaller library for judges. The Great Library was designed by Cumberland and Storm (1857–1860) and features an ornate plaster ceiling, cork floors, an iron spiral staircase and etched glass windows. A War Memorial by Frances Loring (1887–1968), sculpted in 1928, was added to the Great Library in honour of Ontario lawyers and law students who were killed during the First World War. Behind the Great Library (and accessible through it) is the American Room, designed by Burke and Horwood in 1895, a more intimate room with a spiral staircase. The Toronto Courthouse at 361 University Avenue, directly to the north, is accessible through a connecting tunnel.

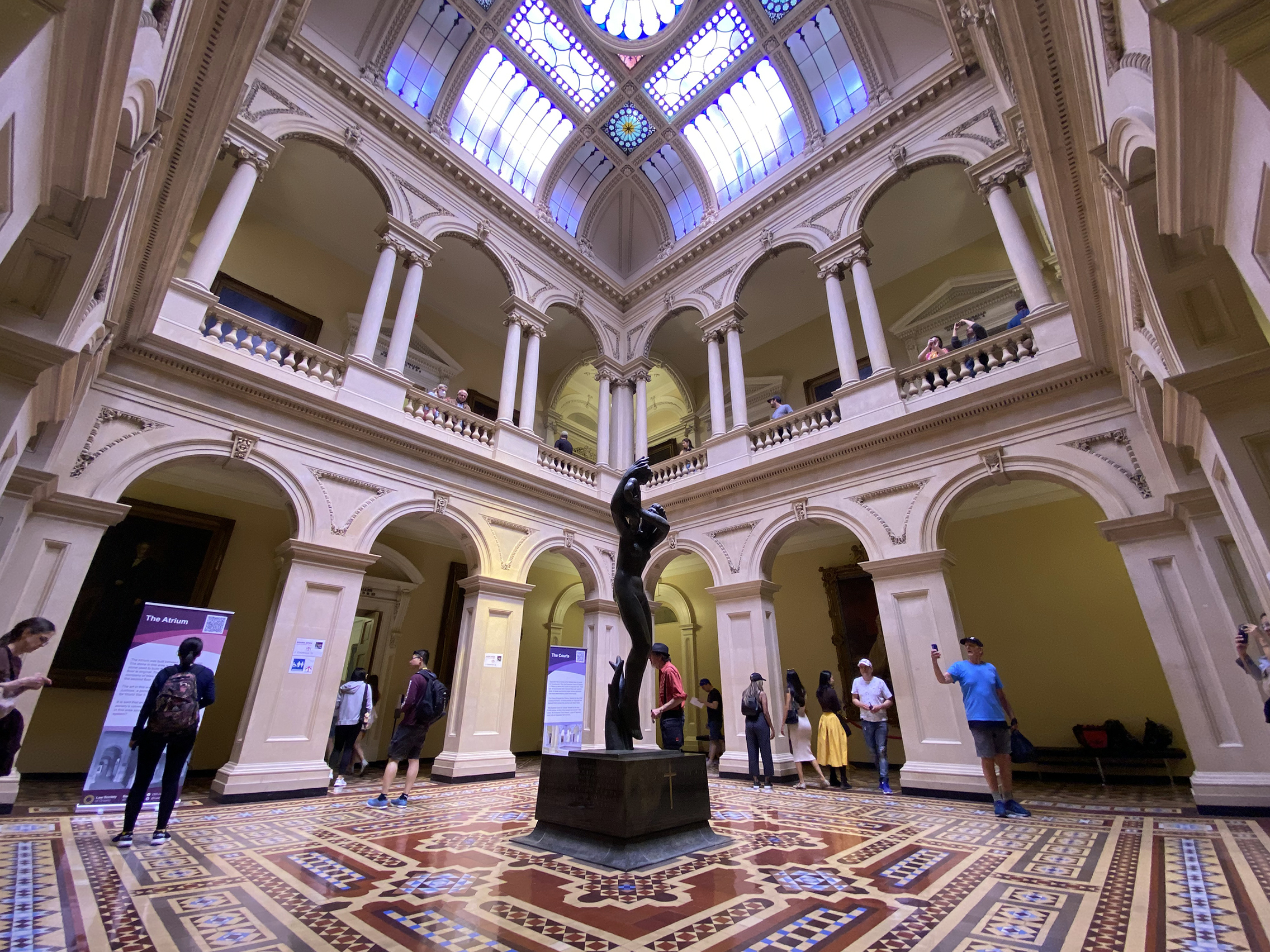
Sculpture inside the hall

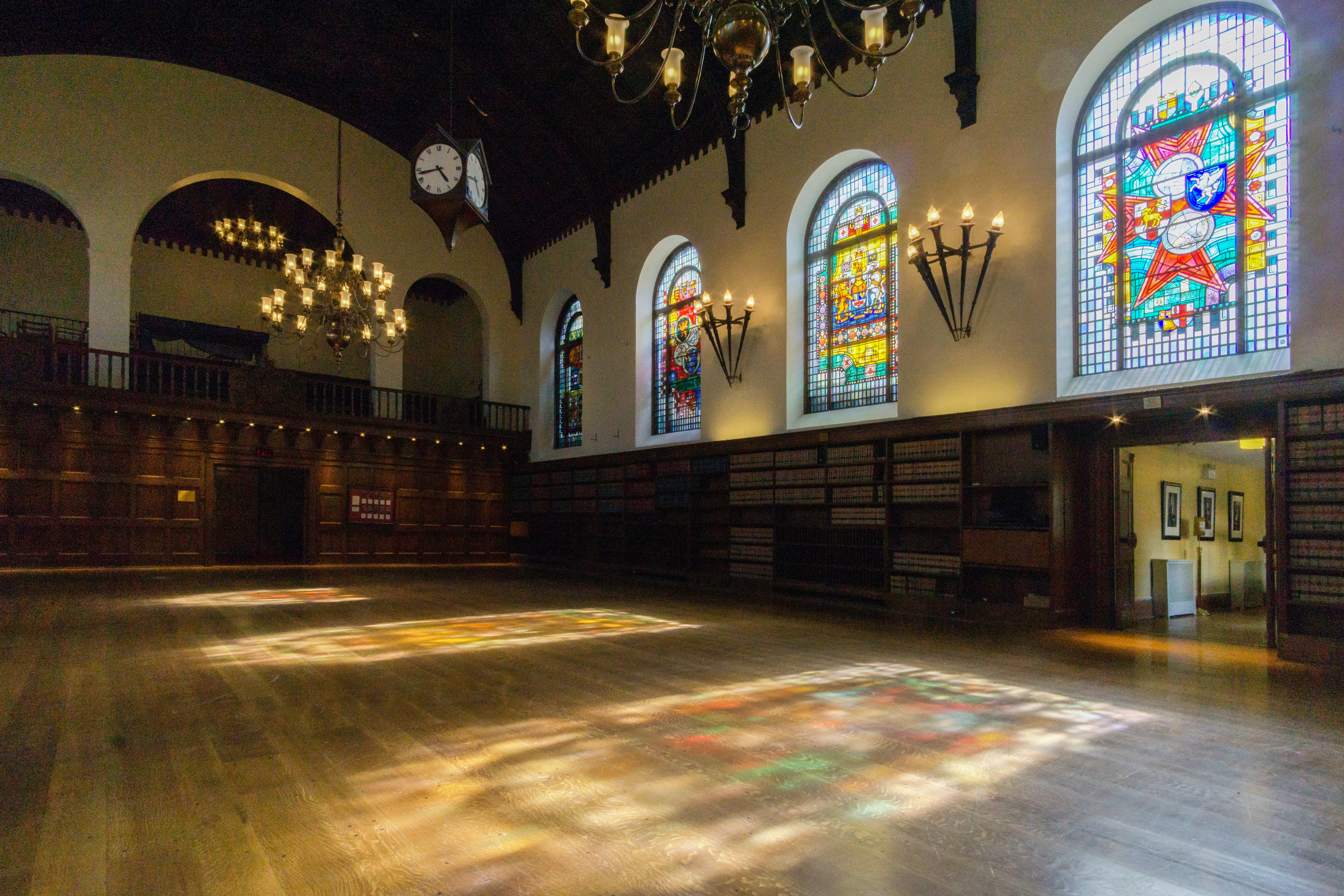
Osgoode Hall Dining Room

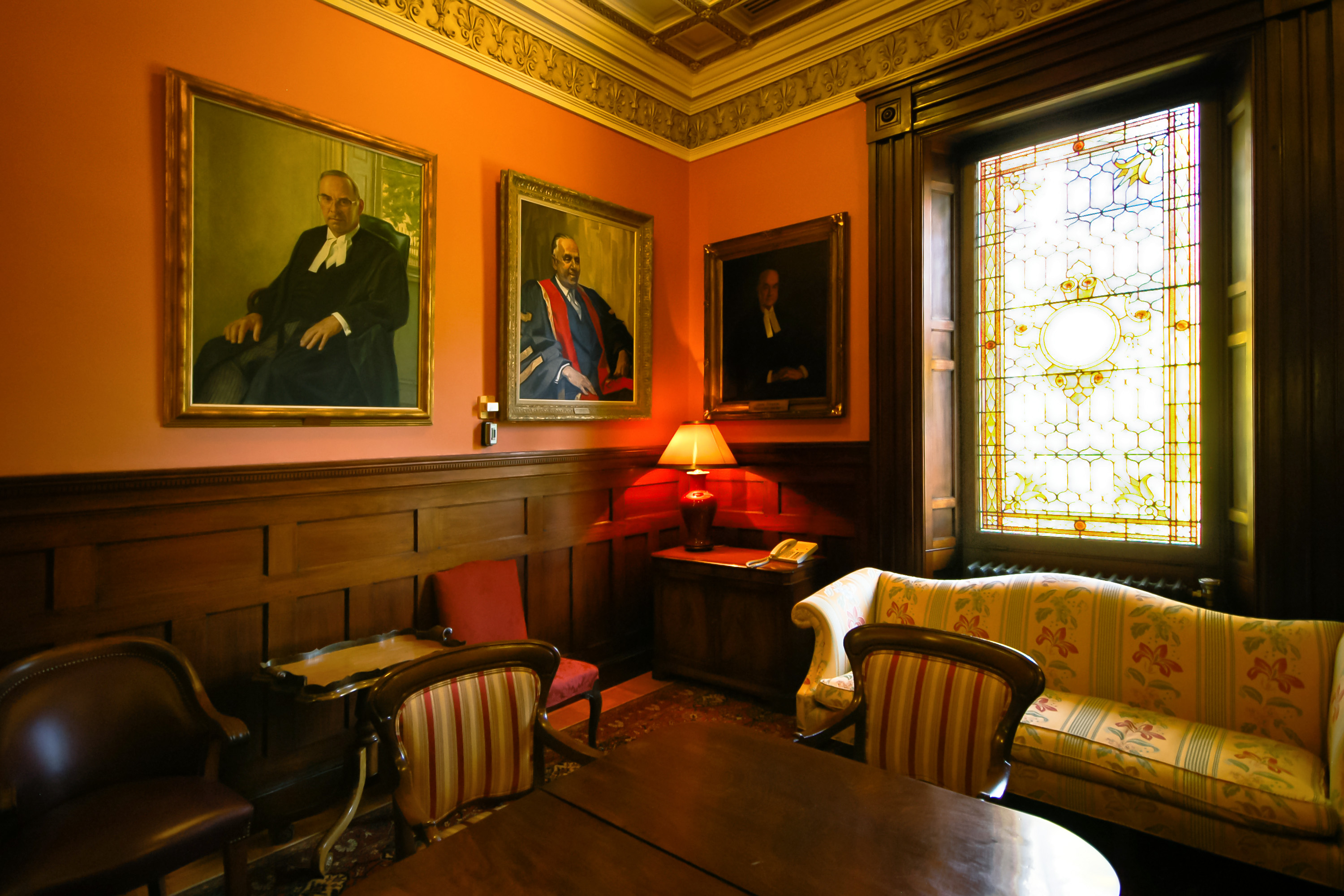
Hall Rooms

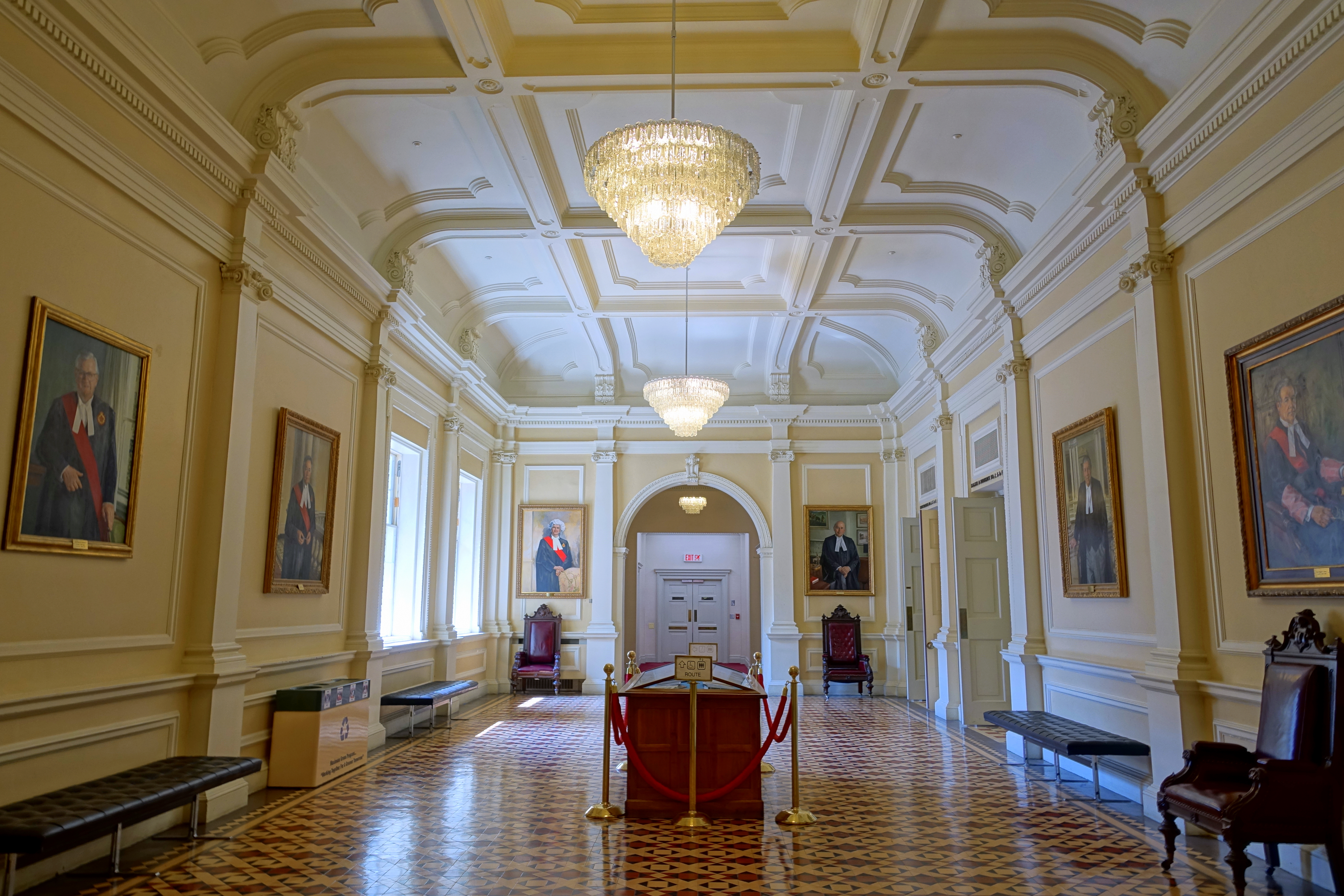
Hall lobby

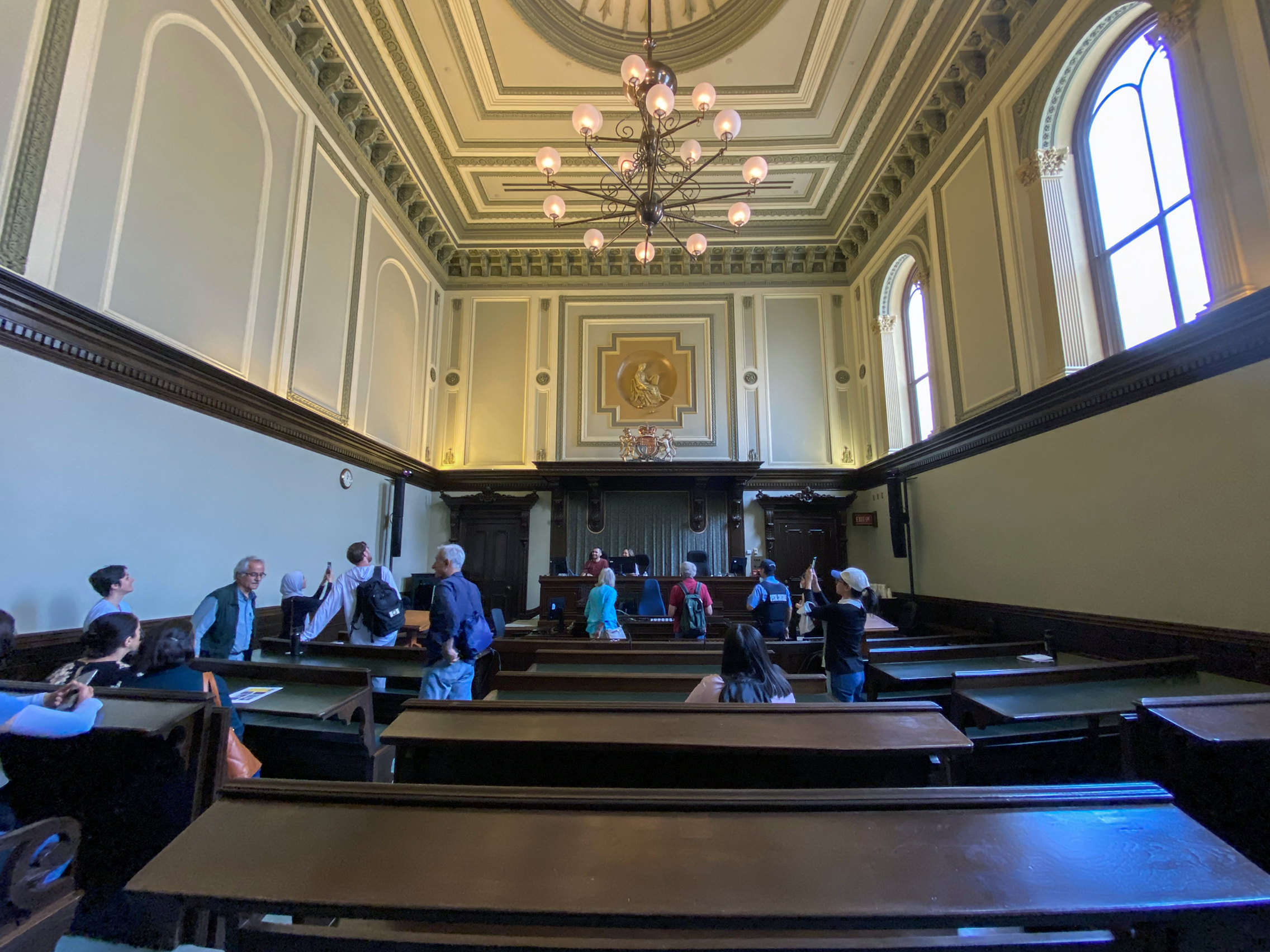
Level 2 Courtroom

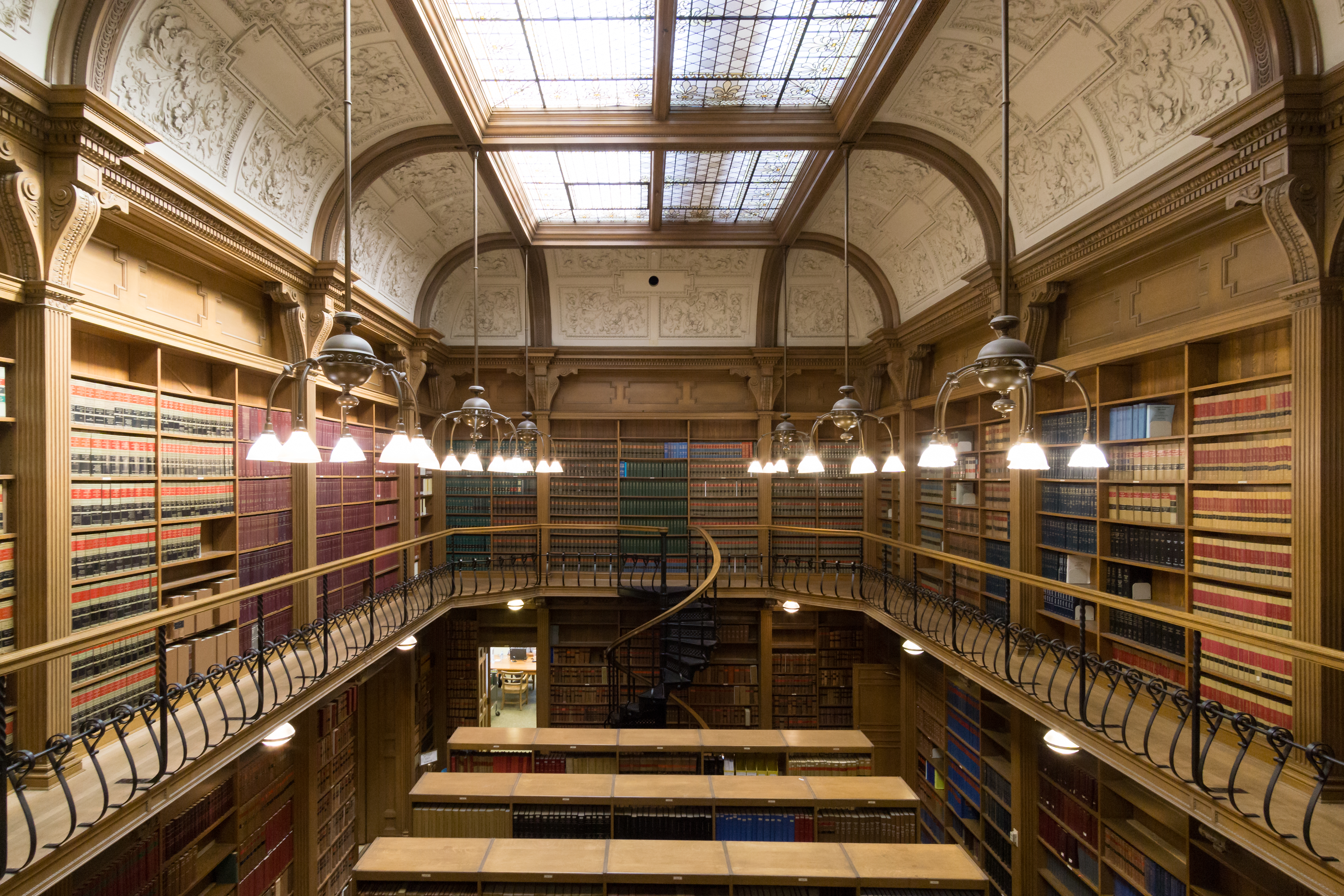
American Room

== See also ==
- List of oldest buildings and structures in Toronto
