= John Alexander Calder =

Canadian politician from Ontario

Member of the Ontario Provincial Parliament for Oxford North
- In office September 23, 1918 – July 22, 1921
- Preceded by: Newton Rowell
- Succeeded by: David Munroe Ross

Personal details
- Party: Liberal

John Alexander Calder was a Canadian politician from Ontario. He represented Oxford North in the Legislative Assembly of Ontario from a 1918 by-election to his resignation in 1921.

== See also ==
- 15th Parliament of Ontario
