= Oxford North (provincial electoral district) =

Former provincial electoral district in Ontario, Canada

Ontario electoral district

Defunct provincial electoral district
- Legislature: Legislative Assembly of Ontario
- District created: 1867
- District abolished: 1933
- First contested: 1867
- Last contested: 1929

Oxford North was a provincial electoral district in Ontario, Canada. It was created in 1867 at the time of confederation and was abolished in 1933 before the 1934 election.

== Members of Provincial Parliament ==
Oxford North
Assembly	Years	Member	Party
1st	1867–1871	George Perry	Liberal
2nd	1871–1872	George Perry	Liberal
2nd	1872–1874	Oliver Mowat	Liberal
3rd	1875–1879	Oliver Mowat	Liberal
4th	1879–1883	Oliver Mowat	Liberal
5th	1883–1886	Oliver Mowat	Liberal
6th	1886–1890	Oliver Mowat	Liberal
7th	1890–1894	Oliver Mowat	Liberal
8th	1894–1896	Oliver Mowat	Liberal
8th	1896–1898	Andrew Pattulo	Liberal
9th	1898–1902	Andrew Pattulo	Liberal
10th	1902–1903	Andrew Pattulo	Liberal
10th	1903–1904	James S. Munro	Liberal
11th	1905–1908	James S. Munro	Liberal
12th	1908–1911	Andrew MacKay	Liberal
13th	1911–1914	Newton Rowell	Liberal
14th	1914–1918	Newton Rowell	Liberal
14th	1918–1919	John Alexander Calder	Liberal
15th	1919–1921	John Alexander Calder	Liberal
15th	1921–1923	David Munroe Ross	United Farmers
16th	1923–1926	David Munroe Ross	United Farmers
17th	1926–1928	David Munroe Ross	United Farmers
18th	1929–1934	David Munroe Ross	United Farmers
Sourced from the Ontario Legislative Assembly
Merged into Oxford before 1934 election

== Election results ==
1929 Ontario general election
Party	Candidate	Votes	%	±%
Liberal–Progressive	David Munroe Ross	5,449	50.47	–8.41
Conservative	John William Sales	5,347	49.53	+8.41
Total valid votes		10,796	99.62	
Total rejected ballots		41	0.38	–0.06
Turnout		10,837	70.82	+2.31
Eligible voters		15,303		
Liberal–Progressive hold		Swing		–8.41
Source: Elections Ontario

1926 Ontario general election
Party	Candidate	Votes	%	±%
Liberal–Progressive	David Munroe Ross	6,012	58.88	+18.58
Conservative	Robert H. Marshall	4,199	41.12	+9.11
Total valid votes		10,211	99.56	
Total rejected ballots		45	0.44	–0.17
Turnout		10,256	68.51	+3.85
Eligible voters		14,971		
Liberal–Progressive hold		Swing		+4.74
Source: Elections Ontario

1923 Ontario general election
Party	Candidate	Votes	%	±%
United Farmers	David Munroe Ross	4,019	40.29	–11.71
Conservative	Edward A. Rea	3,193	32.01	–
Liberal	George Freeman Mahon	2,762	27.69	–
Total valid votes		9,974	99.39	
Total rejected ballots		61	0.61	+0.61
Turnout		10,035	64.65	–
Eligible voters		15,521		
United Farmers hold		Swing		–5.86
Source: Elections Ontario

Ontario provincial by-election, December 19, 1921 Death of John Alexander Calder
Party	Candidate	Votes	%	±%
United Farmers	David Munroe Ross	4,692	52.01	–
Unknown	W.W. Day	3,384	37.51	–
Unknown	H.B. Neely	946	10.49	–
Total valid votes		9,022	100.00	
Total rejected ballots		–		
Turnout		9,022	–	–
Eligible voters				
United Farmers gain from Liberal		Swing		–
Source: Elections Ontario

1919 Ontario general election
Party	Candidate	Votes	%	±%
Liberal	John Alexander Calder	5,369	47.61	–
Conservative	Robert Enoch Butler	3,056	27.10	–
Labour-United Farmers	John Scott	2,852	25.29	–
Total valid votes		11,277	94.42	
Total rejected ballots		666	5.58	–
Turnout		11,943	78.63	–
Eligible voters		15,189		
Liberal hold		Swing		–
Source: Elections Ontario

Ontario provincial by-election, August 19, 1918 Resignation of Newton Rowell to contest the 1917 federal election
Party	Candidate	Votes
Liberal	John Alexander Calder	acclaimed
Source: Elections Ontario

1914 Ontario general election
Party	Candidate	Votes	%	±%
Liberal	Newton Rowell	3,048	50.94	–4.96
Conservative	Robert Enoch Butler	2,935	49.06	+4.96
Total valid votes		5,983	99.09	
Total rejected ballots		55	0.91	+0.28
Turnout		6,038	89.25	+21.16
Eligible voters		6,765		
Liberal hold		Swing		–4.96
Source: Elections Ontario

1911 Ontario general election
Party	Candidate	Votes	%	±%
Liberal	Newton Rowell	2,651	55.90	+1.87
Conservative	Robert Lockhart	2,091	44.10	–1.87
Total valid votes		4,742	99.37	
Total rejected ballots		30	0.63	+0.24
Turnout		4,772	68.09	–13.16
Eligible voters		7,008		
Liberal hold		Swing		+1.87
Source: Elections Ontario

1908 Ontario general election
Party	Candidate	Votes	%	±%
Liberal	Andrew MacKay	2,893	54.03	–0.78
Conservative	Robert Enoch Butler	2,461	45.97	+0.78
Total valid votes		5,354	99.61	
Total rejected ballots		21	0.39	–0.06
Turnout		5,375	81.25	+5.43
Eligible voters		6,615		
Liberal hold		Swing		–0.78
Source: Elections Ontario

1905 Ontario general election
Party	Candidate	Votes	%	±%
Liberal	James S. Munro	2,885	54.82	–5.56
Conservative	Robert Enoch Butler	2,378	45.18	+5.56
Total valid votes		5,263	99.55	
Total rejected ballots		24	0.45	+0.45
Turnout		5,287	75.82	–
Eligible voters		6,973		
Liberal hold		Swing		–5.56
Source: Elections Ontario

Ontario provincial by-election, January 26, 1904 Death of Andrew Pattulo
Party	Candidate	Votes	%	±%
Liberal	James S. Munro	2,842	60.38	+9.59
Conservative	Robert Enoch Butler	1,865	39.62	+15.87
Total valid votes		4,707	100.00	
Total rejected ballots		–		
Turnout		4,707	–	–
Eligible voters				
Liberal hold		Swing		–3.14
Source: Elections Ontario

1902 Ontario general election
Party	Candidate	Votes	%	±%
Liberal	Andrew Pattulo	2,254	50.79	–3.20
Independent	D. R. Ross	1,130	25.46	–
Conservative	James S. Munro	1,054	23.75	+12.26
Total valid votes		4,438	99.84	
Total rejected ballots		7	0.16	–0.30
Turnout		4,445	65.26	–11.05
Eligible voters		6,811		
Liberal hold		Swing		–1.60
Source: Elections Ontario

1898 Ontario general election
Party	Candidate	Votes	%	±%
Liberal	Andrew Pattulo	2,838	53.99	–7.78
Independent	L. Kauffmann	1,815	34.53	–
Conservative	R. Montague	604	11.49	–
Total valid votes		5,257	99.55	
Total rejected ballots		24	0.45	+0.45
Turnout		5,281	76.32	–
Eligible voters		6,920		
Liberal hold		Swing		–3.89
Source: Elections Ontario

Ontario provincial by-election, September 7, 1896 Oliver Mowat appointed to the Senate of Canada
Party	Candidate	Votes	%	±%
Liberal	Andrew Pattulo	1,997	61.77	+3.37
Unknown	Mr. Adams	1,236	38.23	–
Total valid votes		3,233	100.00	
Total rejected ballots		–		
Turnout		3,233	–	–
Eligible voters				
Liberal hold		Swing		+1.68
Source: Elections Ontario

1894 Ontario general election
Party	Candidate	Votes	%	±%
Liberal	Oliver Mowat	2,197	58.40	–
Protestant Protective	Charles Horsman	1,565	41.60	–
Total valid votes		3,762	99.63	
Total rejected ballots		14	0.37	–
Turnout		3,776	64.35	–
Eligible voters		5,868		
Liberal hold		Swing		–
Source: Elections Ontario

1890 Ontario general election
Party	Candidate	Votes
Liberal	Oliver Mowat	acclaimed
Source: Elections Ontario

1886 Ontario general election
Party	Candidate	Votes	%	±%
Liberal	Oliver Mowat	1,981	63.31	–
Conservative	Charles Wilson	1,148	36.69	–
Total valid votes		3,129	99.71	
Total rejected ballots		9	0.29	–
Turnout		3,138	49.29	–
Eligible voters		6,366		
Liberal hold		Swing		–
Source: Elections Ontario

1883 Ontario general election
Party	Candidate	Votes
Liberal	Oliver Mowat	acclaimed
Source: Elections Ontario

1879 Ontario general election
Party	Candidate	Votes	%
Liberal	Oliver Mowat	1,731	75.10
Conservative	N. Curry	574	24.90
Total valid votes		2,305	41.71
Eligible voters		5,526	
Liberal hold			
Source: Elections Ontario

1875 Ontario general election
Party	Candidate	Votes
Liberal	Oliver Mowat	Acclaimed
Source: Elections Ontario

Ontario provincial by-election, November 29, 1872 Resignation of George Perry
Party	Candidate	Votes
Liberal	Oliver Mowat	Acclaimed
Source: History of the Electoral Districts, Legislatures and Ministries of the Province of Ontario

1871 Ontario general election
Party	Candidate	Votes
Liberal	George Perry	Acclaimed
Source: Elections Ontario

1867 Ontario general election
Party	Candidate	Votes	%
Liberal	George Perry	1,187	55.36
Conservative	George Clark	957	44.64
Total valid votes		2,144	58.34
Eligible voters		3,675	
Liberal pickup new district.			
Source: Elections Ontario

== See also ==
- List of Ontario provincial electoral districts
- Canadian provincial electoral districts
