= Wilmot Creek =

Settlement in Ontario, Canada

Coordinates: 43.899°N 78.621°W

Location of Wilmot Creek in Ontario

Wilmot Creek is a community located in the municipality of Clarington in Ontario, Canada.

The waterway Wilmot Creek was once called Baldwin Creek after settler Robert Baldwin, father of William Warren Baldwin.
