= William Warren Baldwin =

Canadian doctor, businessman, lawyer, judge, architect and reform politician

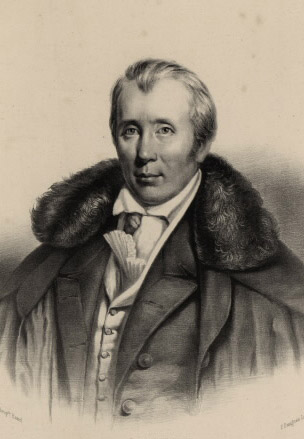

6th Treasurer of the Law Society of Upper Canada
- In office 1811–1815
- Preceded by: G. D'Arcy Boulton
- Succeeded by: G. D'Arcy Boulton

Personal details
- Born: April 25, 1775 County Cork, Ireland
- Died: January 8, 1844 (aged 68) Toronto, Upper Canada
- Education: University of Edinburgh
- Occupation: Architect
- Buildings: Bank of Upper Canada, Osgoode Hall

William Warren Baldwin (April 25, 1775 – January 8, 1844) was a medical doctor, businessman, lawyer, judge, architect and reform politician in Upper Canada. He, and his son Robert Baldwin, are recognized for having introduced the concept of "responsible government", the principle of cabinet rule on which Canadian democracy is based.

== Early life ==
William Warren Baldwin was born in County Cork, Ireland, in 1775 of Robert Baldwin Sr. and Barbara Spread. William graduated from the medical school at the University of Edinburgh in 1797. Faced with the prospect of the uprising of the Society of United Irishmen in 1798, he came to Upper Canada with his father and family, arriving in July 1799. The family moved to Clarke Township in Durham County (his father acquired land at the foot of Toronto Street between Wilmot Creek and Bond Head) where he became a lieutenant-colonel in the Durham militia and a justice of the peace in 1800. William found few patients in Durham, so he moved to the town of York (Toronto) and took up other occupations. In 1803, he was admitted to the bar and, in 1809, he became a district court judge. He served several terms as Treasurer of the Law Society of Upper Canada.

William married Phœbe Willcocks, daughter of William Willcocks, in 1803. Phœbe and her unmarried sister inherited the estate of their father in 1813, and their cousin Elizabeth Russell in 1822. William inherited his father Robert Baldwin Sr's 200-acre estate in 1817. With this wealth they built an estate in 1818 on the future site of Spadina House and laid out the grand avenue, Spadina, that was to link it to the city. The house burned down in 1835 and was rebuilt on the same foundations. The current building was built on the original foundations.

== Reform politics ==
In 1820, he was elected to the 8th Parliament of Upper Canada representing York & Simcoe. In 1829-30 he represented Norfolk County in the 10th Parliament. His record shows he was no foe of aristocracy, and should be considered a whig constitutionalist. Baldwin's status as gentleman added legitimacy to the reform policies on responsible government that he supported. When he was not re-elected in 1831, he bitterly left politics and focused on other causes such as the response to the 1832 Cholera epidemic, the Mechanics Institute and the House of Refuge and Industry. He was appointed director of the Dispensary by John Rolph.

In 1836, he became a member of the Constitutional Reform Society of Upper Canada. Lieutenant Governor Sir Francis Bond Head removed him from his appointments as judge. However, Baldwin, although he supported reform, did not endorse the Upper Canada Rebellion, preferring to work through lawful means.

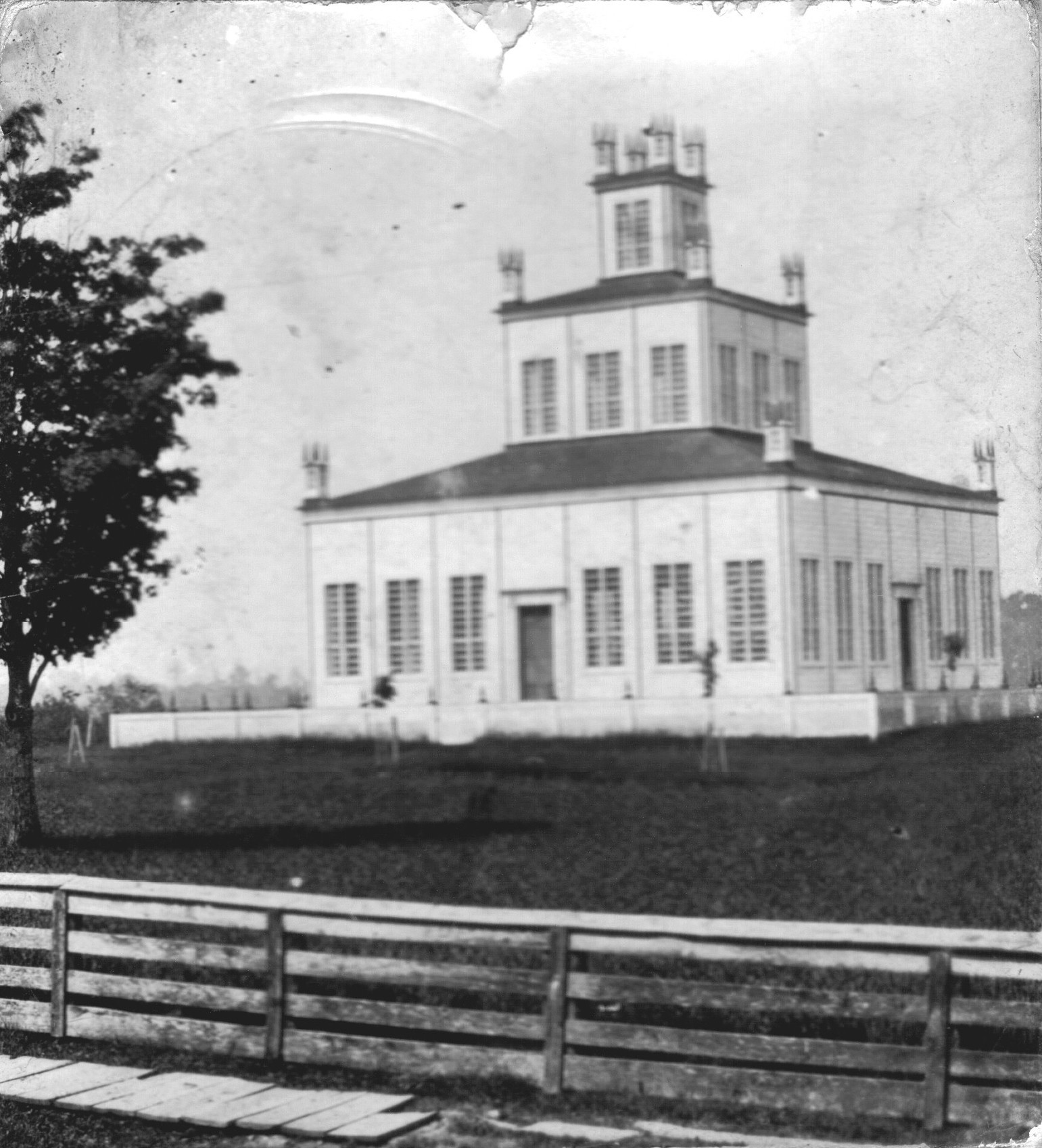
The Temple of the Children of Peace, Sharon, Ontario

Having spoken directly with Lord Durham in 1838, and seeing that Durham had incorporated the call for "responsible government" in his official report, Baldwin was emboldened to resume direct political participation once more. He and 222 inhabitants of the Home district petitioned Sheriff William Jarvis to call a public meeting to discuss Durham's recommendation on responsible government in August 1839. Jarvis, however, was swayed by "the influential part of the inhabitants" and refused the reformers. The petitioners decided to call a meeting of the "friends of Responsible Government" for the 15th of October outside the city. When Baldwin called the meeting to order, Jarvis led an Orange Tory mob, which tore a fence apart, and used its broken shards to beat on the defenseless meeting-goers. Jarvis led a charge on a wagon on which Baldwin and Francis Hincks were perched, shouting "Down with them! Down with them!" The attackers broke up the meeting. While doing that, they killed a nineteen-year-old member of the Children of Peace, David Leppard was struck in the temple with a rock with such force that he was knocked from his wagon and died soon after. The murder - which was never punished - formed an alliance between the Baldwin family and the Children of Peace.

When Robert Baldwin gave up his seat in the riding of 4th York to take a seat in Hastings, the Children of Peace began a movement to draft Baldwin to accept the reform nomination to replace him. Baldwin, however, was reticent about accepting. The violence of the Yonge Street Durham meeting had led to strenuous objections from his wife who was "quite terrified" at the thought of his re-entering politics. He ultimately accepted only when Robert quieted his mother's fears in early August. He quickly abandoned the plan when Robert suggested that Louis LaFontaine run in his stead.

In late 1843, Sir Charles Metcalfe, the Governor General, appointed Baldwin to the Legislative Council of the United Canadas. It was an honour he enjoyed for only a few weeks. He died at Toronto January 8, 1844, aged 69.

== Charitable work ==
=== Home District Savings Bank ===
Banks in this period did not have savings accounts. In order to encourage the working poor of the city to save for periods of unemployment, the Lt. Governor pushed for the establishment of a Home District Savings Bank on June 5, 1830 "for the earnings of Journeymen Tradesmen, Mechanics, Servants, Labourers." Baldwin was one of the 7 directors.

=== Board of Health ===
Baldwin was the president of the York Board of Health established to contain the 1832 Cholera epidemic.

=== Toronto Mechanics Institute ===
Baldwin was elected the vice-president of the newly founded Toronto Mechanics Institute in 1830, and remained in that role until elected president in 1834 until 1837.

=== Toronto House of Industry ===
The day-to-day operations of the House of Industry were left to a three-member "weekly committee" composed of Baldwin, the Baptist preacher Alexander Stewart, and John Powell, an attorney. Under Baldwin's leadership, the House of Industry applied for, and was granted, 4 acres of land within the city, which it planned to cultivate with the help of its inmates. Although only granted 4 acres, the reformers had sought 50. The intent was clearly to establish an "agricultural colony" for the poor – most of whom were pauper emigrants – in keeping with the 1834 published suggestion of Baldwin's cousin James Buchanan (the British Consul and emigrant agent for Upper Canada in New York) for an "emigrant depot".

== Architectural work ==
Building	Year Completed	Builder	Style	Source	Location	Image
Bank of Upper Canada	1827	William Warren Baldwin	Palladian	4	252 Adelaide St. E.	
Osgoode Hall	1832	John Ewart/William Warren Baldwin (1832)	Palladian	4	130 Queen Street West	
