= J. S. Ewart =

Canadian lawyer and author (1849–1933)

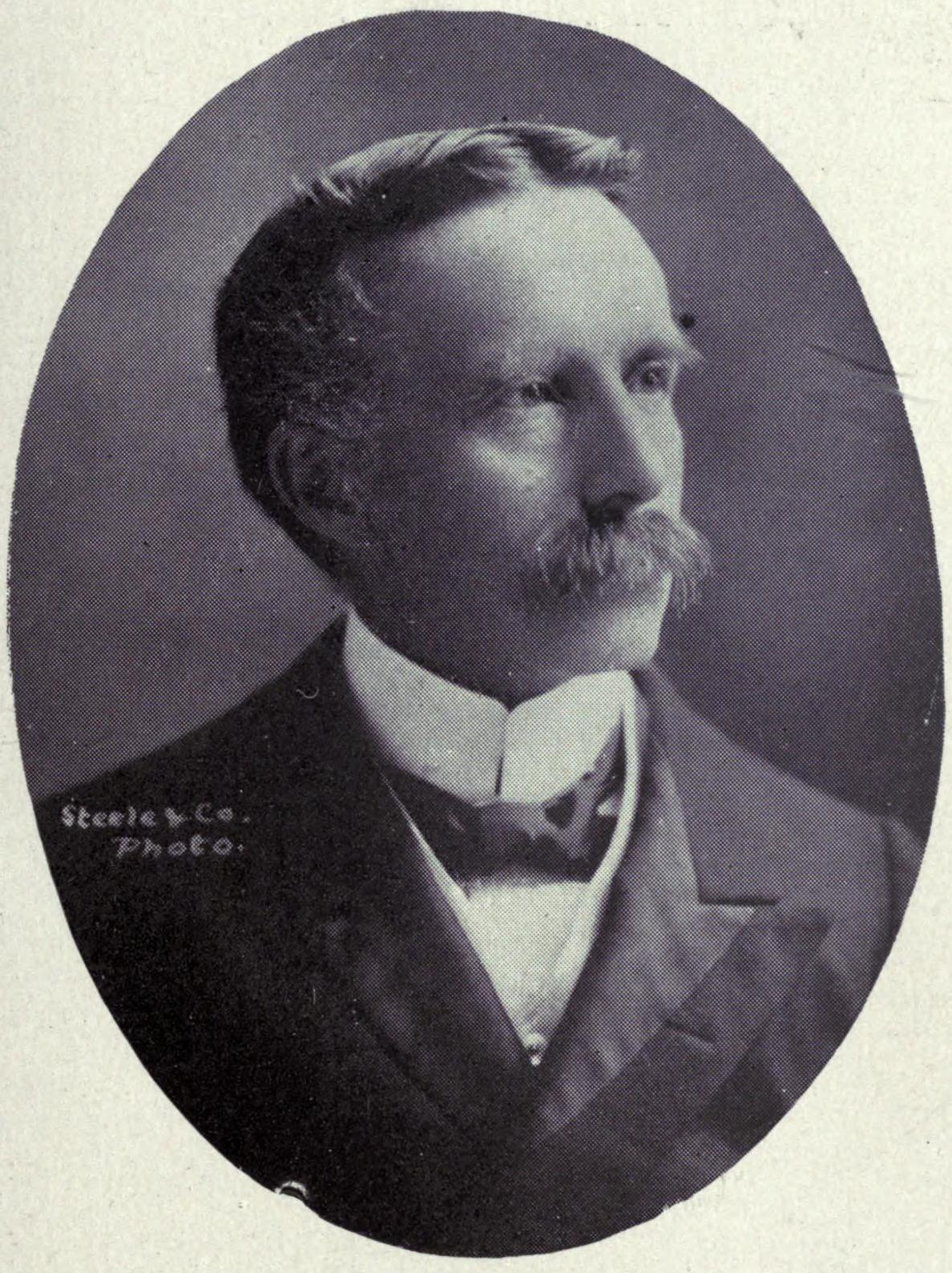
Ewart circa 1902

John Skirving Ewart, QC (August 11, 1849 – February 21, 1933) was a Canadian lawyer and author best known as an advocate for the independence of Canada.

Ewart was born in Toronto, Ontario, on August 11, 1849, to Thomas Ewart and Catherine Seaton Skirving. His grandfather was Toronto architect John Ewart, and his uncle Sir Oliver Mowat. He married Jessie Campbell in 1873.

He was educated at Upper Canada College and Osgoode Hall Law School, and was called to the bar in 1871 (Q.C., 1884). His legal career spanned work in Toronto, Winnipeg and Ottawa. He was the author of many essays and articles, and a passionate advocate for the independence of Canada. In 1903, he published his essay The Kingdom of Canada, where he strongly criticized appeals to the Judicial Committee of the Privy Council. Sovereignty for Ewart required the abolishment of the appeal to the Privy Council, and that Canada needed to be able to settle its own disputes, a power it relinquished in 1875.

In 1894, Ewart argued on behalf of French and Roman Catholics of Manitoba at the Supreme Court of Canada in In Re Statutes of Manitoba relating to Education as part of the Manitoba Schools Question.

He died in Ottawa and is buried at Beechwood Cemetery.

== Published works ==
- The Kingdom of Canada: Imperial Federation, The Colonial Conferences, The Alaska Boundary, and Other Essays (Toronto, 1908)
- John A. Macdonald and the Canadian Flag (Toronto, 1908)
- Canadian Independence (Toronto, 1911)
- Waiver Distributed Among the Departments: Election, Estoppel, Contract, Release (Cambridge, 1917)
- The Roots and Causes of the Wars (1914-1918) (2 vols., New York, 1925)
- Two series of brochures:
  - The Kingdom Papers, nos. 1-19 (Ottawa, 1911-4)
  - The Independence Papers (Ottawa, 2 vols., 1925–30).
