= Andrew MacKay (Canadian politician) =

Member of the Ontario Provincial Parliament for Oxford North
- In office June 8, 1908 – November 13, 1911
- Preceded by: James S. Munro
- Succeeded by: Newton Rowell

Personal details
- Party: Liberal

Andrew MacKay was a Canadian politician from Ontario. He represented Oxford North in the Legislative Assembly of Ontario from 1908 to 1911.

== See also ==
- 12th Parliament of Ontario
