= George Perry (Ontario politician) =

Canadian politician

Member of Ontario Provincial Parliament
- In office 1867–1872
- Preceded by: Riding established
- Succeeded by: Oliver Mowat
- Constituency: Oxford North

Personal details
- Born: October 7, 1818
- Died: January 9, 1891 (aged 72) Perry, Ontario
- Party: Liberal
- Occupation: Teacher

George Perry (7 Oct 1818 – 9 Jan 1891) was a Canadian politician and teacher who represented Oxford North in the Legislative Assembly of Ontario as a Liberal member from 1867 to 1872.

Perry was a teacher and also served as reeve of Blenheim Township. He gave up his seat in 1872 to allow Oliver Mowat to sit in the legislature. He later served as sheriff for Oxford County.

Perry Township in Parry Sound District, Ontario was named after him.

== Electoral history ==
1867 Ontario general election: Oxford North
Party	Candidate	Votes	%
Liberal	George Perry	1,187	55.36
Conservative	George Clark	957	44.64
Total valid votes		2,144	58.34
Eligible voters		3,675	
Liberal pickup new district.			
Source: Elections Ontario

1871 Ontario general election: Oxford North
Party	Candidate	Votes
Liberal	George Perry	Acclaimed
Source: Elections Ontario
