= Andrew Pattulo =

Canadian politician

Andrew Pattullo

Member of Provincial Parliament, Ontario
- In office 1896–1903
- Preceded by: Oliver Mowat
- Succeeded by: James S. Munro
- Constituency: Oxford North

Personal details
- Born: c. 1850 Caledon Township, Canada West
- Died: 29 December 1903 London
- Party: Liberal
- Spouse: Isabel Balmer (m. 1889)
- Occupation: Newspaper editor

Andrew Pattullo (c. 1850 – December 29, 1903) was a Canadian journalist and politician who represented Oxford North in the Legislative Assembly of Ontario as a Liberal member from 1896 to 1903.

== Life ==
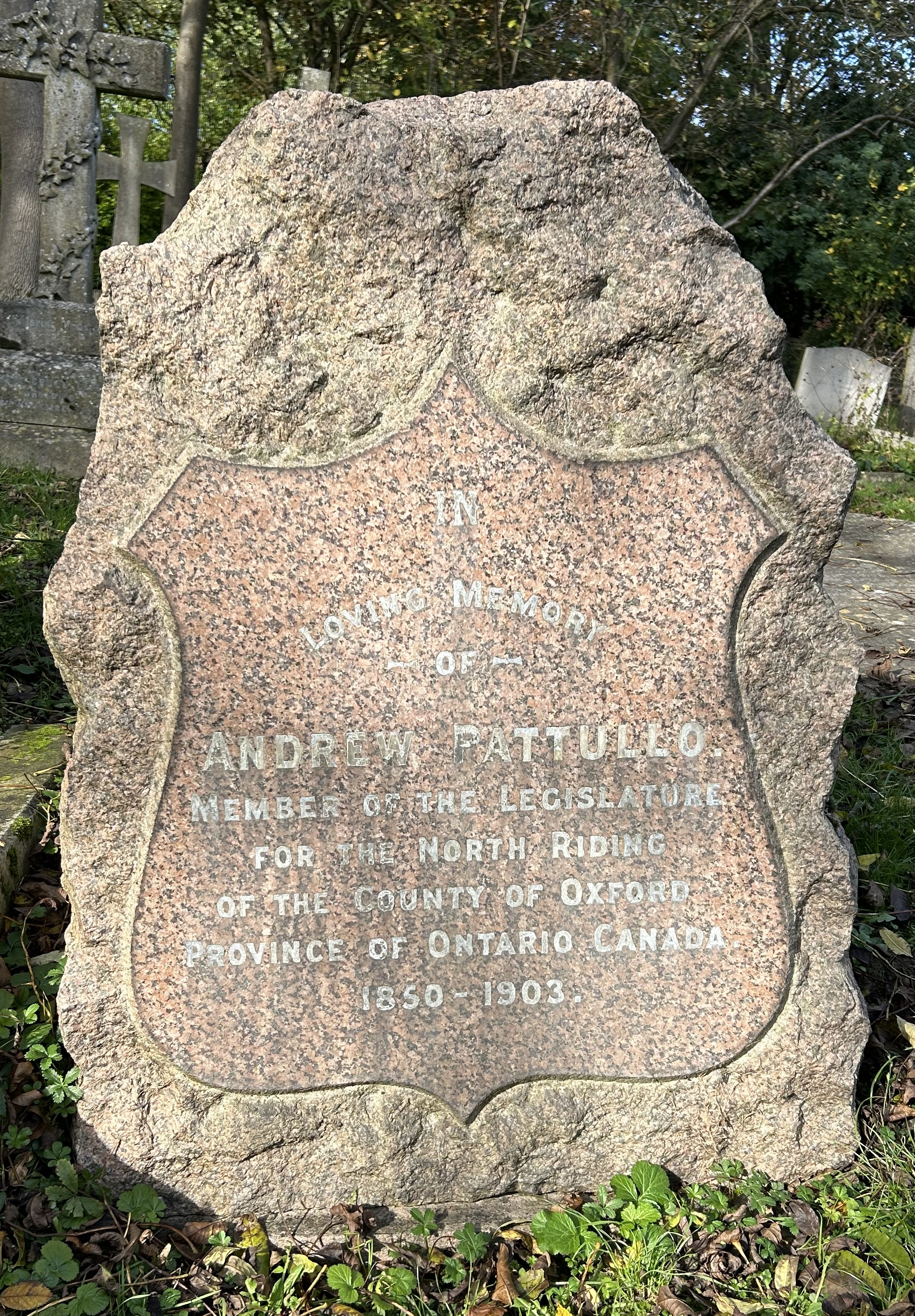
Grave of Andrew Pattullo in Highgate Cemetery

He was born in Caledon Township, Canada West in about 1850, the son of Scottish immigrants. He studied in Dundas and St. Catharines and at the University College in London, England. In 1889, he married Isabel Balmer.

Pattullo was owner and editor of the Sentinel Review in Woodstock. He served as president of the Canadian Press Association. He was first elected to the provincial assembly in an 1896 by-election held after Oliver Mowat entered federal politics.

Pattullo died in December 1903 on a visit to London and was buried in Highgate Cemetery.
