= James S. Munro =

Canadian politician

James Munro

Ontario MPP
- In office 1904–1908
- Preceded by: Andrew Pattulo
- Succeeded by: Andrew MacKay
- Constituency: Oxford North

Personal details
- Born: November 22, 1846 New York City, New York
- Party: Liberal
- Spouse: Adelaide Hirtch (m. 1878)

James S. Munro (November 22, 1846 – after 1908) was an American-born agent and politician in Ontario, Canada. He represented Oxford North in the Legislative Assembly of Ontario from 1904 to 1908 as a Liberal.

He was born in New York City and was educated in Ontario. In 1878, Munro married Adelaide Hirtch. He was first elected to the Ontario assembly in a 1904 by-election and was reelected in 1905.
