= John Ewart (architect) =

Canadian architect and businessman

- Born: January 31, 1788; Tranent Scotland
- Died: September 18, 1856 (aged 68); Toronto, Canada West
- Occupation: Architect
- Buildings: Osgoode Hall;

John Ewart (January 31, 1788 – September 18, 1856) was a Canadian architect and businessman.

He was born in Tranent, Scotland in 1788. After completing his apprenticeship in building, he moved to London around 1811. In 1816, he emigrated to New York City and moved to York (Toronto) in Upper Canada a few years later. He built a hospital and then the town's first Roman Catholic church, St. Paul's. In 1818, he built the parliament building for Upper Canada at York. In 1824, he designed the courthouse and jail for the Home District and, in 1827–31, the two-story castellated-style courthouse for the London District, Ontario. He was one of the overseers for the construction of the new parliament building after the original building burned in 1824. In 1829, he prepared the design for the original Osgoode Hall; some remodelling and additions occurred later. He continued to operate a building yard and was a director on the boards of several institutions in the city after 1830, although he had retired as an architect.

His daughter, Jane, was wife of Sir Oliver Mowat, and his son, Thomas Ewart, was married to Catherine Seaton Skirving, a noted philanthropist.

He died in Toronto in 1856 of gangrene, brought on by arteriosclerosis.

== Works ==
Building	Year Completed	Builder	Style	Source	Location	Image
Original St. Andrew's Church of Scotland	1831, demolished after 1900	John Ewart (1831), John Howard (1841 spire)	Regency		Southwest corner of Church Street and Adelaide Street East	
Osgoode Hall	1832–2005	John Ewart/William Warren Baldwin (1832)	Palladian	4	130 Queen Street West, Toronto, Ontario	
Middlesex County Courthouse (London District)	1831	John Ewart	Castlellated-style	2	on the River Thames, Westminster, London, Ontario	
Bank of Upper Canada Building		John Ewart	Palladian	2	Adelaide, Toronto, Ontario	Bank of Upper Canada
