= Middlesex County Court House (London, Ontario) =

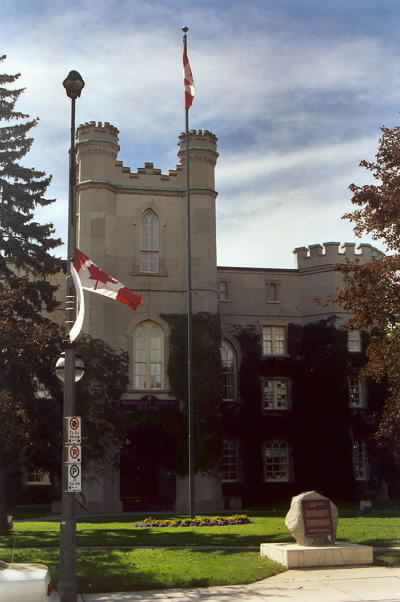
- Interactive map of Middlesex County Court House
- Location: 399 Ridout Street North; London, Ontario; N6A 2P1
- Coordinates: 42°58′55.59″N 81°15′15.65″W
- Area: 4 acres (1.6 ha)
- Founded: 1830
- Built: 1829
- Architect: John Ewart of York
- Architectural style: Gothic Revival
- Governing body: Ontario Heritage Trust

National Historic Site of Canada
- Official name: Middlesex County Court House National Historic Site of Canada
- Designated: 1955

Ontario Heritage Act
- Type: Municipal Heritage Designation (Part IV)
- Designated: November 1980

The Middlesex County Court House is a historic building and a National Historic Site of Canada in London, Ontario, Canada. The courthouse building is an "early example of the Gothic Revival style, pre-dating the earliest important Gothic Revival public building in England".

== Description ==
The building at 399 Ridout Street North, commonly known as Middlesex County Court House, is situated south of Dundas Street, and north of King Street in the County of Middlesex in the City of London. The three-storey parged brick building has castle-like features and Gothic details. The courthouse displays a classical compositional form with a central pavilion and two side wings in the form of prominent octagonal towers at each corner. The courthouse features a stone foundation housing the cell blocks, squared mortar-covered brick walls to give a stone-like appearance, octagonal towers, a polygonal bay, tall lancet windows, secondary square windows and distinctive crenelations.

== History ==
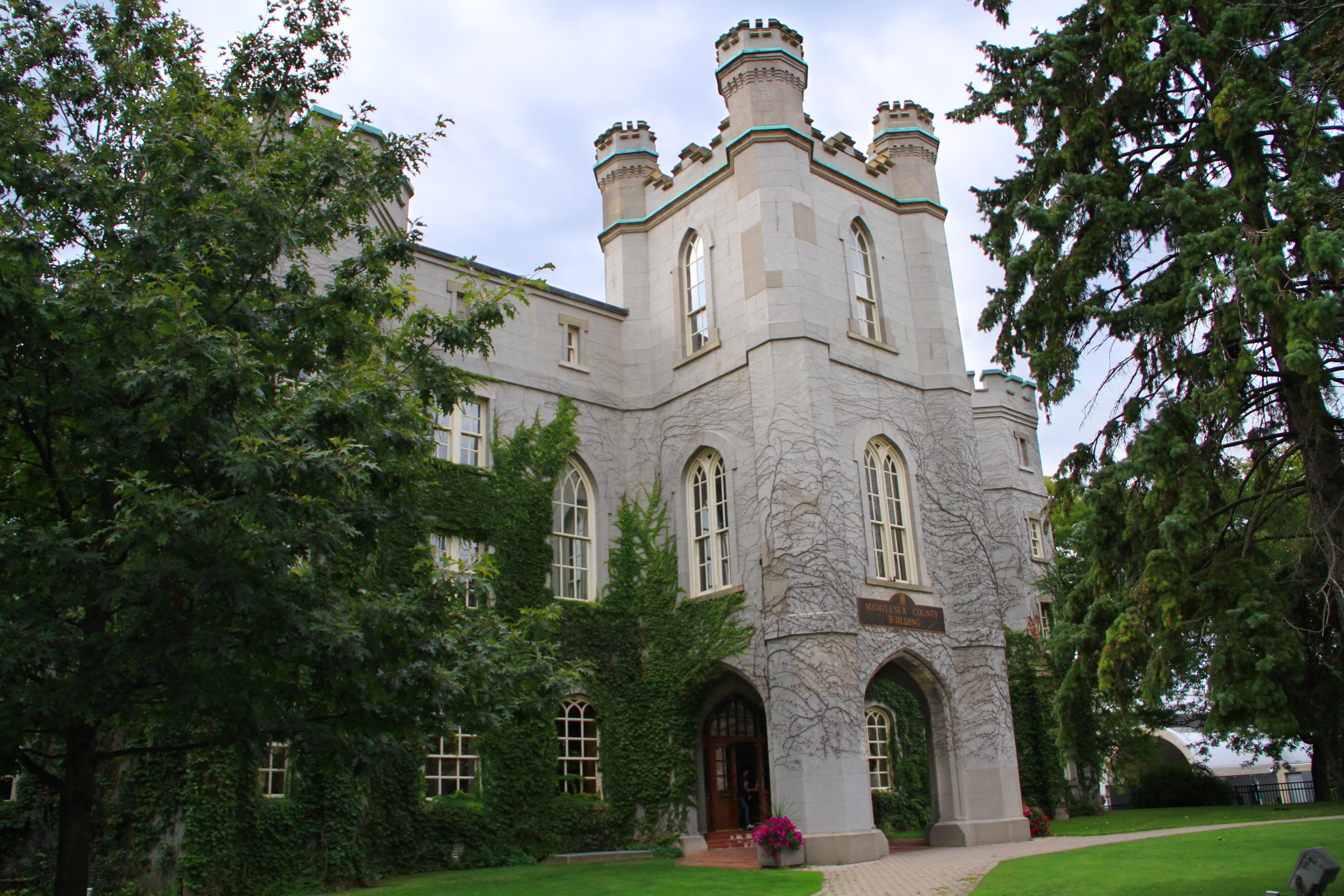
Southwest view of the building

The building was designed in the Gothic Revival style by Toronto architect John Ewart, and constructed from 1827 to 1829. The building, which included the court, jail and police office administrative offices, was constructed from locally quarried stone.

In 1955, it was designated a National Historic Site because

[I]t is a very early example of the Gothic Revival style, pre-dating the earliest important Gothic Revival public building in England, the Houses of Parliament.

The exterior of the building and the scenic qualities of the landscape, are protected by an Ontario Heritage Trust conservation easement. The building is also designated under Part 4 of the Ontario Heritage Act.
