= Catherine Seaton Skirving =

Catherine Seaton Skirving (Ewart), (10 March 1818 – 7 May 1897), was a Canadian philanthropist and volunteer. She was born in Musselburgh, Scotland and arrived in Upper Canada with her family in 1833.

In 1846 she became the daughter-in-law of John Ewart, a noted Toronto architect, having married his son Thomas Ewart, a rising barrister. He became the law partner of Oliver Mowat, a Prime Minister of Canada. She was the mother of John Skirving Ewart, a Canadian lawyer and author.

Catherine served as president of the Woman's Foreign Missionary Society of the Presbyterian Church. She died in Toronto, Canada.
