= Michael Hamilton Foley =

Michael Hamilton Foley (1820 – April 8, 1870) was a lawyer and political figure in Canada West.

He was born in Sligo in Ireland in 1820 and came to Port Colborne in Upper Canada with his parents in 1822. He began work as a school teacher but later worked as a journalist on several newspapers while studying law. He was called to the bar in 1851. In 1854, he was elected to the 5th Parliament of the Province of Canada representing North Waterloo as a Reformer; he was reelected in 1857. In 1858, he was chosen to be postmaster general. Originally, he aligned himself with George Brown; he later opposed Brown, supporting John Sandfield Macdonald as a moderate Reformer. Later, under pressure from his constituents, he supported Brown's proposals in support of restructuring the union. In 1861, he was elected in both North Waterloo and Perth; he chose to represent Perth. However, he was appointed postmaster general in 1861 and chose to rerun in North Waterloo. In 1863, he was reelected as an independent Reformer. In 1864, he was appointed postmaster general, but was defeated in the resulting by-election. Although he ran for office both federally and provincially in 1867, he was unsuccessful.

He died in Simcoe, Ontario in 1870.
