= James Christie Palmer Esten =

Canadian lawyer and judge (1805–1864)

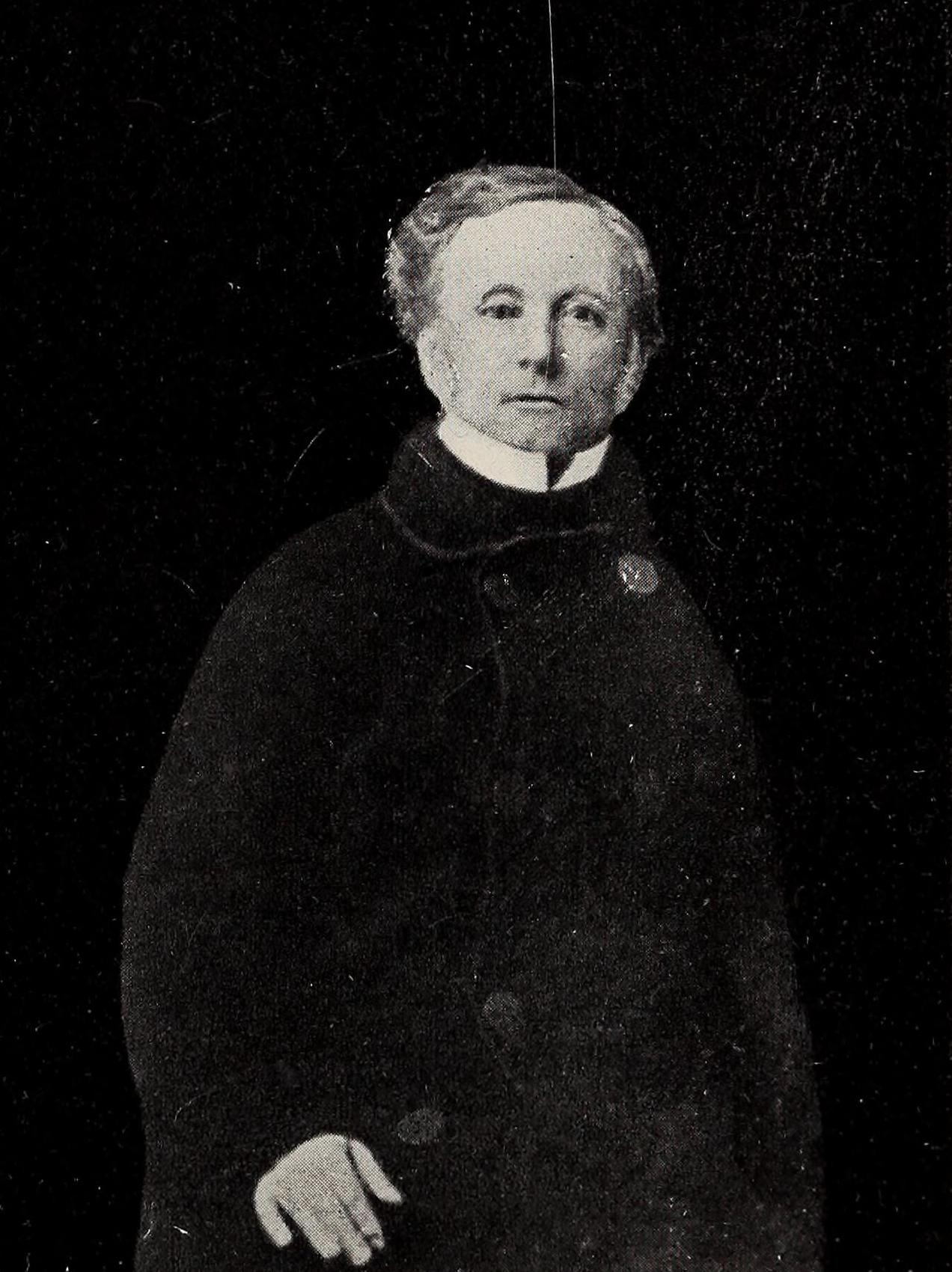
Portrait of Esten published 1905

James Christie Palmer Esten (November 7, 1805 – October 24, 1864) was a lawyer and judge in Upper Canada (now Ontario).

Esten was born on November 7, 1805, in St. George's, Bermuda. He was sent to England as a child and educated at Charterhouse School. He then studied law at Lincoln's Inn. After being called to the bar, he moved to Exeter and practised there briefly.

He came to Upper Canada in either 1836 or 1837 and settled in Toronto, where he opened a law office. He practised until 1849, when he was appointed to the bench.

He died on October 24, 1864, in Toronto.
