= Chapleau =

Chapleau may refer to:

- Chapleau, Ontario, a township in Ontario
- Chapleau 61, a Michipicoten First Nation reserve in Ontario
- Chapleau 61A, a Chapleau Ojibway First Nation reserve in Ontario
- Chapleau 74, a Chapleau Ojibway First Nation reserve in Ontario
- Chapleau 74A, a Chapleau Ojibway First Nation reserve in Ontario
- Chapleau 75, a Chapleau Cree First Nation reserve in Ontario
- Chapleau Cree Fox Lake, a Chapleau Cree First Nation reserve in Ontario
- Chapleau (federal electoral district), a former Canadian federal electoral district
- Chapleau (provincial electoral district), a current Quebec electoral district
- Joseph-Adolphe Chapleau, former Quebec premier and lieutenant governor, for whom all three of the above were named
