= Osgoode Township High School =

Location
- 2800 8th Line Road; Ottawa, Ontario, K0A 2P0; Canada; 45.2288°N 75.4698°W

Information
- Motto: Semper ad altiora nitamur (Always, we strive for higher)
- Founded: 1920
- School board: Ottawa Carleton District School Board
- Superintendent: Shawn Lehman
- Area trustee: Mark Fisher
- Principal: Ann Arden
- Grades: 9 to 12
- Enrollment: 446 (2022)
- Campus: Rural, Suburban
- Colour: Double blue
- Team name: Panthers
- Communities served: Metcalfe, Greely, Osgoode, Carlsbad Springs, Vernon, Edwards, Kenmore, Manotick
- Feeder schools: Metcalfe Public, Castor Valley, Rideau Valley
- Website: oths.ocdsb.ca

Osgoode Township High School is a high school in the Metcalfe community of Ottawa, Ontario, Canada. The school was founded in 1920, as Metcalfe Continuation School, by the Carleton Board of Education in what was then Osgoode Township. Since 1944, the school has been under the jurisdiction of the Ottawa Carleton District School Board. In 1954, the school moved into its current location on 8th Line Road and was named Osgoode Township High School.

The school's student body is drawn from the communities of Metcalfe, Greely, Osgoode, Carlsbad Springs, Vernon, Edwards, Kenmore, Manotick and the area surrounding these communities.

In addition to the regular English Ontario school curriculum, Osgoode Township High School also offers cooperative education, composite studies, French immersion, and the Ontario Youth Apprenticeship Program. Despite its small student population, the school has successful athletic and music programs.

== Notable alumni ==
- Larry Robinson (hockey player)

== See also ==
- Education in Ontario
- List of secondary schools in Ontario
