= List of population centres in Ontario =

A population centre, in Canadian census data, is a type of census unit which meets the demographic characteristics of an urban area, having a population of at least 1,000 people and a population density of no fewer than 400 persons per square km^{2}. Note that the population of a "population centre" is not the same thing as the population of a municipality; the population centre can include areas outside the municipal boundaries which are directly contiguous with the municipality's urban area, and can exclude areas inside the municipal boundaries which are less densely urbanized.

The term was first introduced in the Canada 2011 Census; prior to that, Statistics Canada used the term urban area.

In the 2021 Census of Population, Statistics Canada listed 300 population centres in the province of Ontario.

== List ==
The below table is a list of those population centres in Ontario from the 2021 Census of Population as designated, named, and delineated by Statistics Canada.

Rank	Population centre	Size group	Population (2021)	Population (2016)	Change	Land area (km^{2})	Population density
1	Toronto	Large urban	5,647,656	5,433,590	+3.9%	1,829.05	3,087.8/km^{2}
2	Ottawa - Gatineau	Large urban	1,068,821	994,576	+7.5%	549.49	1,945.1/km^{2}
3	Hamilton	Large urban	729,560	693,362	+5.2%	356.03	2,049.2/km^{2}
4	Kitchener	Large urban	522,888	473,230	+10.5%	296.45	1,763.8/km^{2}
5	London	Large urban	423,369	384,784	+10.0%	244.97	1,728.2/km^{2}
6	Oshawa	Large urban	335,949	309,759	+8.5%	159.79	2,102.4/km^{2}
7	Windsor	Large urban	306,519	288,363	+6.3%	184.96	1,657.2/km^{2}
8	St. Catharines - Niagara Falls	Large urban	242,460	229,776	+5.5%	140.59	1,724.6/km^{2}
9	Barrie	Large urban	154,676	146,394	+5.7%	95.33	1,622.5/km^{2}
10	Guelph	Large urban	144,356	132,705	+8.8%	79.57	1,814.2/km^{2}
11	Kanata	Large urban	137,118	118,308	+15.9%	62.35	2,199.2/km^{2}
12	Kingston	Large urban	127,943	119,061	+7.5%	83.43	1,533.5/km^{2}
13	Milton	Large urban	124,579	101,885	+22.3%	45.2	2,756.2/km^{2}
14	Brantford	Large urban	104,413	98,250	+6.3%	62.13	1,680.6/km^{2}
15	Thunder Bay	Medium	95,266	94,767	+0.5%	76.03	1,253.0/km^{2}
16	Sudbury	Medium	92,093	88,155	+4.5%	75.79	1,215.1/km^{2}
17	Peterborough	Medium	84,793	82,149	+3.2%	54.58	1,553.6/km^{2}
18	Belleville	Medium	75,052	68,859	+9.0%	89.48	838.8/km^{2}
19	Sarnia	Medium	73,944	73,403	+0.7%	60.53	1,221.6/km^{2}
20	Welland - Pelham	Medium	69,302	63,011	+10.0%	57.21	1,211.4/km^{2}
21	Sault Ste. Marie	Medium	64,923	66,313	−2.1%	52.97	1,225.7/km^{2}
22	Bowmanville - Newcastle	Medium	56,742	48,929	+16.0%	31.23	1,816.9/km^{2}
23	North Bay	Medium	51,433	50,396	+2.1%	64.91	792.4/km^{2}
24	Cornwall	Medium	47,286	46,114	+2.5%	32.4	1,459.4/km^{2}
25	Woodstock	Medium	46,296	40,614	+14.0%	34.41	1,345.4/km^{2}
26	St. Thomas	Medium	45,732	41,834	+9.3%	28.1	1,627.5/km^{2}
27	Chatham	Medium	45,171	43,550	+3.7%	31.21	1,447.3/km^{2}
28	Georgetown	Medium	44,058	42,326	+4.1%	25.7	1,714.3/km^{2}
29	Bradford	Medium	38,128	30,765	+23.9%	16.1	2,368.2/km^{2}
30	Stouffville	Medium	36,753	32,634	+12.6%	14.17	2,593.7/km^{2}
31	Leamington	Medium	35,730	33,049	+8.1%	31.77	1,124.6/km^{2}
32	Orangeville	Medium	34,177	32,318	+5.8%	19.77	1,728.7/km^{2}
33	Orillia	Medium	33,379	31,128	+7.2%	22.68	1,471.7/km^{2}
34	Stratford	Medium	32,878	31,094	+5.7%	23.3	1,411.1/km^{2}
35	Innisfil	Small	29,464	24,277	+21.4%	23.71	1,242.7/km^{2}
36	Timmins	Small	28,874	29,331	−1.6%	18.49	1,561.6/km^{2}
37	Keswick - Elmhurst Beach	Small	27,145	26,999	+0.5%	16.56	1,639.2/km^{2}
38	Bolton	Small	26,795	26,378	+1.6%	20.71	1,293.8/km^{2}
39	Midland	Small	26,246	24,443	+7.4%	27.41	957.5/km^{2}
40	Alliston	Small	23,253	19,092	+21.8%	18.78	1,238.2/km^{2}
41	Fergus	Small	23,209	20,928	+10.9%	18.31	1,267.6/km^{2}
42	Collingwood	Small	22,983	20,213	+13.7%	16.38	1,403.1/km^{2}
43	Lindsay	Small	22,367	20,713	+8.0%	15.57	1,436.5/km^{2}
44	Owen Sound	Small	22,318	22,032	+1.3%	20.86	1,069.9/km^{2}
45	Brockville	Small	22,293	21,854	+2.0%	18.7	1,192.1/km^{2}
46	Wasaga Beach	Small	22,194	18,653	+19.0%	28.21	786.7/km^{2}
47	Cobourg	Small	19,830	19,031	+4.2%	15.57	1,273.6/km^{2}
48	Tillsonburg	Small	18,573	15,834	+17.3%	18.97	979.1/km^{2}
49	Valley East	Small	17,251	17,451	−1.1%	25.82	668.1/km^{2}
50	Pembroke	Small	16,571	16,203	+2.3%	17.47	948.5/km^{2}
51	Simcoe	Small	16,121	14,649	+10.0%	16.5	977.0/km^{2}
52	Strathroy	Small	16,056	14,505	+10.7%	15.3	1,049.4/km^{2}
53	Port Colborne	Small	15,441	14,800	+4.3%	13.29	1,161.9/km^{2}
54	Fort Erie	Small	15,372	14,772	+4.1%	14.62	1,051.4/km^{2}
55	Amherstburg	Small	15,177	14,003	+8.4%	13.7	1,107.8/km^{2}
56	Paris	Small	14,956	12,389	+20.7%	13.55	1,103.8/km^{2}
57	Angus - Borden CFB-BFC	Small	14,503	12,561	+15.5%	14.19	1,022.1/km^{2}
58	Petawawa	Small	14,382	13,870	+3.7%	16.01	898.3/km^{2}
59	New Hamburg	Small	14,379	13,595	+5.8%	15.75	913.0/km^{2}
60	Carleton Place	Small	13,940	11,970	+16.5%	12.89	1,081.5/km^{2}
61	Rockland	Small	13,625	12,399	+9.9%	8.15	1,671.8/km^{2}
62	Ingersoll	Small	13,607	12,694	+7.2%	10.32	1,318.5/km^{2}
63	Beamsville	Small	13,323	11,869	+12.3%	9.89	1,347.1/km^{2}
64	Port Hope	Small	13,012	12,587	+3.4%	12.72	1,023.0/km^{2}
65	Caledonia	Small	12,179	9,833	+23.9%	9.18	1,326.7/km^{2}
66	Uxbridge	Small	11,794	11,832	−0.3%	15.46	762.9/km^{2}
67	Hawkesbury	Small	11,755	11,732	+0.2%	10.82	1,086.4/km^{2}
68	Arnprior	Small	11,305	10,426	+8.4%	12.09	935.1/km^{2}
69	Elliot Lake	Small	10,998	10,503	+4.7%	10.27	1,070.9/km^{2}
70	Kenora	Small	10,974	11,112	−1.2%	15.25	719.6/km^{2}
71	Binbrook	Small	10,791	8,794	+22.7%	6.41	1,683.5/km^{2}
72	Elmira	Small	10,790	10,273	+5.0%	8.15	1,323.9/km^{2}
73	Wallaceburg	Small	10,323	10,098	+2.2%	8.84	1,167.8/km^{2}
74	Bracebridge	Small	9,884	9,232	+7.1%	13.38	738.7/km^{2}
75	Port Elgin	Small	9,619	8,297	+15.9%	8.03	1,197.9/km^{2}
76	Tottenham	Small	9,609	5,422	+77.2%	9.93	967.7/km^{2}
77	Port Perry	Small	9,553	9,453	+1.1%	8.76	1,090.5/km^{2}
78	Listowel	Small	9,539	7,530	+26.7%	6.73	1,417.4/km^{2}
79	Crystal Beach	Small	9,531	8,524	+11.8%	11.34	840.5/km^{2}
80	Smiths Falls	Small	9,517	9,068	+5.0%	6.71	1,418.3/km^{2}
81	Acton	Small	9,377	9,462	−0.9%	7.84	1,196.0/km^{2}
82	Kincardine	Small	9,343	8,506	+9.8%	9.59	974.2/km^{2}
83	Shelburne	Small	8,989	8,126	+10.6%	5.71	1,574.3/km^{2}
84	Embrun	Small	8,680	6,968	+24.6%	10.18	852.7/km^{2}
85	Sutton	Small	8,477	7,653	+10.8%	12.55	675.5/km^{2}
86	King	Small	8,396	6,970	+20.5%	14.2	591.3/km^{2}
87	Renfrew	Small	8,337	8,308	+0.3%	12.14	686.7/km^{2}
88	Essex	Small	8,233	7,446	+10.6%	5.56	1,480.8/km^{2}
89	Napanee	Small	8,173	7,439	+9.9%	7.92	1,031.9/km^{2}
90	Aylmer	Small	7,975	7,753	+2.9%	7.2	1,107.6/km^{2}
91	Port Dover	Small	7,871	6,984	+12.7%	8.12	969.3/km^{2}
92	Hanover	Small	7,761	7,507	+3.4%	7.14	1,087.0/km^{2}
93	Goderich	Small	7,728	7,536	+2.5%	4.51	1,713.5/km^{2}
94	St. Marys	Small	7,271	7,137	+1.9%	10.09	720.6/km^{2}
95	Fort Frances	Small	7,159	7,420	−3.5%	7.29	982.0/km^{2}
96	Kapuskasing	Small	7,092	7,378	−3.9%	8.63	821.8/km^{2}
97	Sturgeon Falls	Small	6,939	6,916	+0.3%	6.15	1,128.3/km^{2}
98	Parry Sound	Small	6,788	6,321	+7.4%	7.95	853.8/km^{2}
99	Huntsville	Small	6,639	6,482	+2.4%	8.73	760.5/km^{2}
100	Nobleton	Small	6,507	4,924	+32.1%	8.58	758.4/km^{2}
101	Perth	Small	6,486	6,042	+7.3%	9.39	690.7/km^{2}
102	Smithville	Small	6,456	5,724	+12.8%	6.11	1,056.6/km^{2}
103	Corunna	Small	6,266	5,822	+7.6%	3.79	1,653.3/km^{2}
104	Chelmsford	Small	6,199	6,220	−0.3%	5.5	1,127.1/km^{2}
105	Tay	Small	6,188	5,474	+13.0%	8.64	716.2/km^{2}
106	Kirkland Lake	Small	6,180	6,305	−2.0%	4.17	1,482.0/km^{2}
107	Russell	Small	6,135	5,039	+21.8%	4.56	1,345.4/km^{2}
108	Almonte	Small	6,098	5,536	+10.2%	4.16	1,465.9/km^{2}
109	Chippawa	Small	6,077	5,620	+8.1%	3.72	1,633.6/km^{2}
110	Dunnville	Small	5,907	5,759	+2.6%	5.44	1,085.8/km^{2}
111	Manotick Station	Small	5,873	5,776	+1.7%	9.09	646.1/km^{2}
112	Brighton	Small	5,847	5,879	−0.5%	7.02	832.9/km^{2}
113	Porcupine	Small	5,832	5,811	+0.4%	5.78	1,009.0/km^{2}
114	Gravenhurst	Small	5,789	5,660	+2.3%	6.32	916.0/km^{2}
115	Mount Albert	Small	5,695	5,021	+13.4%	4.67	1,219.5/km^{2}
116	Petrolia	Small	5,632	5,402	+4.3%	6.29	895.4/km^{2}
117	Lively	Small	5,569	5,613	−0.8%	11.67	477.2/km^{2}
118	Rockwood	Small	5,488	4,629	+18.6%	5.92	927.0/km^{2}
119	Ayr	Small	5,383	4,858	+10.8%	5.76	934.5/km^{2}
120	Gananoque	Small	5,383	5,159	+4.3%	7.01	767.9/km^{2}
121	Dryden	Small	5,355	5,596	−4.3%	6.53	820.1/km^{2}
122	Delhi	Small	5,344	5,069	+5.4%	3.83	1,395.3/km^{2}
123	Mississauga Beach	Small	5,293	4,662	+13.5%	5.81	911.0/km^{2}
124	Meaford	Small	5,078	4,945	+2.7%	5.9	860.7/km^{2}
125	Mount Forest	Small	5,040	4,643	+8.6%	3.73	1,351.2/km^{2}
126	Mitchell	Small	4,868	4,604	+5.7%	5.08	958.3/km^{2}
127	Exeter	Small	4,863	4,649	+4.6%	4.39	1,107.7/km^{2}
128	Azilda	Small	4,793	4,716	+1.6%	4.91	976.2/km^{2}
129	Walkerton	Small	4,724	4,537	+4.1%	3.9	1,211.3/km^{2}
130	Stayner	Small	4,699	4,258	+10.4%	4.83	972.9/km^{2}
131	Tilbury	Small	4,687	4,768	−1.7%	4.14	1,132.1/km^{2}
132	Caledon East	Small	4,568	4,282	+6.7%	6.44	709.3/km^{2}
133	Picton	Small	4,508	4,395	+2.6%	5.43	830.2/km^{2}
134	Blenheim	Small	4,487	4,344	+3.3%	4.6	975.4/km^{2}
135	Vineland	Small	4,395	4,260	+3.2%	5.8	757.8/km^{2}
136	Dorchester	Small	4,355	4,400	−1.0%	5.81	749.6/km^{2}
137	New Liskeard	Small	4,232	4,444	−4.8%	7.02	602.8/km^{2}
138	Richmond	Small	4,228	4,055	+4.3%	4.1	1,031.2/km^{2}
139	Waterford	Small	4,227	3,676	+15.0%	3.51	1,204.3/km^{2}
140	Beeton	Small	4,151	3,891	+6.7%	2.5	1,660.4/km^{2}
141	Prescott	Small	4,078	4,217	−3.3%	4.02	1,014.4/km^{2}
142	Kemptville	Small	4,051	3,911	+3.6%	3.73	1,086.1/km^{2}
143	Southampton	Small	3,993	3,678	+8.6%	6.43	621.0/km^{2}
144	Espanola	Small	3,986	3,714	+7.3%	3.87	1,030.0/km^{2}
145	Casselman	Small	3,970	3,563	+11.4%	5.16	769.4/km^{2}
146	Deep River	Small	3,860	3,782	+2.1%	4.31	895.6/km^{2}
147	Sioux Lookout	Small	3,781	2,941	+28.6%	6.32	598.3/km^{2}
148	Cochrane	Small	3,774	3,669	+2.9%	3.66	1,031.1/km^{2}
149	Bobcaygeon	Small	3,576	3,525	+1.4%	5.15	694.4/km^{2}
150	Hearst	Small	3,537	3,835	−7.8%	5.02	704.6/km^{2}
151	Wellesley	Small	3,536	3,246	+8.9%	1.67	2,117.4/km^{2}
152	Thornbury	Small	3,474	2,873	+20.9%	5.87	591.8/km^{2}
153	Campbellford	Small	3,372	3,473	−2.9%	3.72	906.5/km^{2}
154	St. George	Small	3,354	3,255	+3.0%	2.97	1,129.3/km^{2}
155	Beaverton	Small	3,347	2,822	+18.6%	4.81	695.8/km^{2}
156	Haileybury	Small	3,247	3,281	−1.0%	3	1,082.3/km^{2}
157	Ballantrae	Small	3,224	3,223	0.0%	7.06	456.7/km^{2}
158	Tavistock	Small	3,171	2,955	+7.3%	2.64	1,201.1/km^{2}
159	Clinton	Small	3,113	3,049	+2.1%	2.89	1,077.2/km^{2}
160	Lucan	Small	3,089	2,541	+21.6%	2.01	1,536.8/km^{2}
161	Frankford	Small	3,079	2,825	+9.0%	2.91	1,058.1/km^{2}
162	Bridgenorth - Chemong Park Area	Small	3,072	2,950	+4.1%	6.98	440.1/km^{2}
163	Wheatley	Small	3,060	2,868	+6.7%	3.4	900.0/km^{2}
164	Hagersville	Small	3,059	2,939	+4.1%	3.15	971.1/km^{2}
165	Norwich	Small	3,038	2,852	+6.5%	2.69	1,129.4/km^{2}
166	Grand Bend	Small	3,031	2,684	+12.9%	6.39	474.3/km^{2}
167	Marathon	Small	3,022	3,138	−3.7%	4.33	697.9/km^{2}
168	Port Stanley	Small	3,008	2,231	+34.8%	3.78	795.8/km^{2}
169	Virgil	Small	3,008	2,937	+2.4%	2.41	1,248.1/km^{2}
170	Palmerston	Small	2,989	2,624	+13.9%	2.54	1,176.8/km^{2}
171	Wingham	Small	2,981	2,934	+1.6%	2.47	1,206.9/km^{2}
172	Lakefield	Small	2,943	2,768	+6.3%	2.69	1,094.1/km^{2}
173	Capreol	Small	2,919	2,920	0.0%	2.26	1,291.6/km^{2}
174	Alexandria	Small	2,906	2,845	+2.1%	2.07	1,403.9/km^{2}
175	Iroquois Falls	Small	2,866	2,955	−3.0%	1.56	1,837.2/km^{2}
176	Dundalk	Small	2,803	2,046	+37.0%	2.41	1,163.1/km^{2}
177	Ridgetown	Small	2,797	3,002	−6.8%	2.73	1,024.5/km^{2}
178	Durham	Small	2,755	2,609	+5.6%	3.24	850.3/km^{2}
179	Erin	Small	2,725	2,647	+2.9%	4.1	664.6/km^{2}
180	Grand Valley	Small	2,720	1,825	+49.0%	2.88	944.4/km^{2}
181	Seaforth	Small	2,673	2,680	−0.3%	2.79	958.1/km^{2}
182	Mount Brydges	Small	2,656	2,117	+25.5%	5.5	482.9/km^{2}
183	Schomberg	Small	2,656	2,691	−1.3%	2.39	1,111.3/km^{2}
184	Arthur	Small	2,628	2,556	+2.8%	4.24	619.8/km^{2}
185	Thamesford	Small	2,622	2,116	+23.9%	2.76	950.0/km^{2}
186	Harrow	Small	2,562	2,710	−5.5%	2.86	895.8/km^{2}
187	Osgoode	Small	2,535	2,578	−1.7%	2.97	853.5/km^{2}
188	Elmvale	Small	2,520	2,314	+8.9%	1.98	1,272.7/km^{2}
189	Fenelon Falls	Small	2,490	2,464	+1.1%	3.98	625.6/km^{2}
190	Wawa	Small	2,431	2,610	−6.9%	1.76	1,381.3/km^{2}
191	Forest	Small	2,429	2,277	+6.7%	2.33	1,042.5/km^{2}
192	Winchester	Small	2,417	2,394	+1.0%	2.26	1,069.5/km^{2}
193	Dresden	Small	2,401	2,451	−2.0%	2.78	863.7/km^{2}
194	Morrisburg	Small	2,398	2,385	+0.5%	1.36	1,763.2/km^{2}
195	Wyoming	Small	2,348	2,361	−0.6%	4.59	511.5/km^{2}
196	Colchester	Small	2,334	2,229	+4.7%	3.06	762.7/km^{2}
197	Drayton	Small	2,279	2,111	+8.0%	2.8	813.9/km^{2}
198	Constance Bay	Small	2,263	2,314	−2.2%	5.56	407.0/km^{2}
199	Ilderton	Small	2,250	1,985	+13.4%	1.19	1,890.8/km^{2}
200	Limoges	Small	2,213	2,048	+8.1%	1.22	1,813.9/km^{2}
201	Wendover	Small	2,176	1,785	+21.9%	3.58	607.8/km^{2}
202	Blind River	Small	2,174	2,284	−4.8%	3.82	569.1/km^{2}
203	Glencoe	Small	2,158	2,126	+1.5%	2.66	811.3/km^{2}
204	Long Sault	Small	2,154	1,951	+10.4%	2.35	916.6/km^{2}
205	Stirling	Small	2,074	2,030	+2.2%	3.03	684.5/km^{2}
206	Wiarton	Small	1,996	1,989	+0.4%	2.36	845.8/km^{2}
207	St. Jacobs	Small	1,959	1,988	−1.5%	2.81	697.2/km^{2}
208	Atikokan	Small	1,929	1,965	−1.8%	2.37	813.9/km^{2}
209	Amigo Beach	Small	1,924	1,598	+20.4%	2.57	748.6/km^{2}
210	Marchmont - Bass Lake	Small	1,902	1,562	+21.8%	4.09	465.0/km^{2}
211	Harriston	Small	1,887	1,797	+5.0%	1.3	1,451.5/km^{2}
212	Chesley	Small	1,879	1,843	+2.0%	1.91	983.8/km^{2}
213	Carlisle	Small	1,858	1,869	−0.6%	2.56	725.8/km^{2}
214	Cannington	Small	1,839	1,845	−0.3%	1.81	1,016.0/km^{2}
215	Bath	Small	1,825	1,670	+9.3%	3.87	471.6/km^{2}
216	Metcalfe	Small	1,811	1,776	+2.0%	2.19	826.9/km^{2}
217	Oro Station - Hawkestone	Small	1,806	1,691	+6.8%	2.22	813.5/km^{2}
218	Milverton	Small	1,797	1,586	+13.3%	1.33	1,351.1/km^{2}
219	Coniston	Small	1,782	1,814	−1.8%	2.25	792.0/km^{2}
220	Vankleek Hill	Small	1,781	1,742	+2.2%	2.23	798.7/km^{2}
221	Cardinal	Small	1,770	1,717	+3.1%	2.44	725.4/km^{2}
222	Geraldton	Small	1,761	1,838	−4.2%	2.64	667.0/km^{2}
223	Millbrook	Small	1,739	1,695	+2.6%	2.07	840.1/km^{2}
224	Mattawa	Small	1,721	1,812	−5.0%	2.13	808.0/km^{2}
225	Cayuga	Small	1,720	1,713	+0.4%	2.13	807.5/km^{2}
226	Parkhill	Small	1,707	1,737	−1.7%	2.45	696.7/km^{2}
227	Manitouwadge	Small	1,682	1,735	−3.1%	2.35	715.7/km^{2}
228	Big Bay Point	Small	1,670	844	+97.9%	2.63	635.0/km^{2}
229	Dutton	Small	1,658	1,454	+14.0%	2	829.0/km^{2}
230	Cookstown	Small	1,647	1,214	+35.7%	1.14	1,444.7/km^{2}
231	Sandy Lake 88	Small	1,601	49	+3,167.3%	1.35	1,185.9/km^{2}
232	Deseronto	Small	1,598	1,645	−2.9%	1.27	1,258.3/km^{2}
233	Attawapiskat 91A	Small	1,586	1,501	+5.7%	1.33	1,192.5/km^{2}
234	Norwood	Small	1,585	1,380	+14.9%	1.99	796.5/km^{2}
235	Everett	Small	1,570	1,670	−6.0%	1.58	993.7/km^{2}
236	Chesterville	Small	1,564	1,677	−6.7%	1.86	840.9/km^{2}
237	Watford	Small	1,563	1,536	+1.8%	1.17	1,335.9/km^{2}
238	Tweed	Small	1,541	1,701	−9.4%	2.5	616.4/km^{2}
239	McGregor	Small	1,536	1,859	−17.4%	3.32	462.7/km^{2}
240	Factory Island	Small	1,530	1,812	−15.6%	1.44	1,062.5/km^{2}
241	Wellington	Small	1,526	1,353	+12.8%	3.3	462.4/km^{2}
242	Plattsville	Small	1,520	1,366	+11.3%	1.37	1,109.5/km^{2}
243	Marmora	Small	1,499	1,639	−8.5%	2.15	697.2/km^{2}
244	Sunderland	Small	1,490	1,243	+19.9%	1.13	1,318.6/km^{2}
245	Madoc	Small	1,489	1,540	−3.3%	2.19	679.9/km^{2}
246	Ingleside	Small	1,487	1,384	+7.4%	1.76	844.9/km^{2}
247	Carp	Small	1,477	1,290	+14.5%	2.05	720.5/km^{2}
248	Colborne	Small	1,474	1,577	−6.5%	1.74	847.1/km^{2}
249	Moosonee	Small	1,471	1,405	+4.7%	1.64	897.0/km^{2}
250	Caledon	Small	1,466	1,482	−1.1%	2.84	516.2/km^{2}
251	Dowling	Small	1,449	1,466	−1.2%	1.35	1,073.3/km^{2}
252	Wikwemikong	Small	1,417	1,567	−9.6%	3.44	411.9/km^{2}
253	Iroquois	Small	1,406	1,299	+8.2%	2.01	699.5/km^{2}
254	Bayfield	Small	1,394	1,235	+12.9%	2.86	487.4/km^{2}
255	Stoney Point	Small	1,394	1,318	+5.8%	2.46	566.7/km^{2}
256	Hastings	Small	1,388	1,159	+19.8%	2.15	645.6/km^{2}
257	West Lorne	Small	1,385	1,337	+3.6%	1.81	765.2/km^{2}
258	Englehart	Small	1,371	1,418	−3.3%	1.31	1,046.6/km^{2}
259	L'Orignal	Small	1,359	1,483	−8.4%	2.91	467.0/km^{2}
260	Port Rowan	Small	1,357	1,354	+0.2%	3.17	428.1/km^{2}
261	Innerkip	Small	1,342	894	+50.1%	1.47	912.9/km^{2}
262	Longlac	Small	1,316	1,434	−8.2%	1.74	756.3/km^{2}
263	Stevensville	Small	1,316	1,179	+11.6%	2.52	522.2/km^{2}
264	Belmont	Small	1,275	1,140	+11.8%	0.99	1,287.9/km^{2}
265	Red Lake	Small	1,263	1,182	+6.9%	1.54	820.1/km^{2}
266	Craigleith and Swiss Meadows	Small	1,259	546	+130.6%	3.08	408.8/km^{2}
267	Powassan	Small	1,241	1,343	−7.6%	1.68	738.7/km^{2}
268	St. Clements	Small	1,240	820	+51.2%	1.51	821.2/km^{2}
269	Mildmay	Small	1,222	1,219	+0.2%	1.6	763.8/km^{2}
270	Claremont	Small	1,215	1,202	+1.1%	2.12	573.1/km^{2}
271	Jarvis	Small	1,214	1,084	+12.0%	0.56	2,167.9/km^{2}
272	Little Current	Small	1,210	1,558	−22.3%	2.23	542.6/km^{2}
273	Markdale	Small	1,206	1,216	−0.8%	2.3	524.3/km^{2}
274	Creemore	Small	1,194	1,170	+2.1%	1.59	750.9/km^{2}
275	Bourget	Small	1,175	1,169	+0.5%	2.23	526.9/km^{2}
276	New Dundee	Small	1,174	1,119	+4.9%	1.53	767.3/km^{2}
277	Lucknow	Small	1,154	1,121	+2.9%	1.69	682.8/km^{2}
278	Eganville	Small	1,149	1,085	+5.9%	2.26	508.4/km^{2}
279	Thessalon	Small	1,147	1,175	−2.4%	1.88	610.1/km^{2}
280	Munster	Small	1,145	939	+21.9%	0.67	1,709.0/km^{2}
281	Chapleau	Small	1,144	1,170	−2.2%	0.59	1,939.0/km^{2}
282	Golden	Small	1,143	1,154	−1.0%	0.93	1,229.0/km^{2}
283	Horseshoe Valley	Small	1,127	866	+30.1%	2.68	420.5/km^{2}
284	Hensall	Small	1,126	1,021	+10.3%	1.86	605.4/km^{2}
285	Palgrave	Small	1,107	1,044	+6.0%	1.84	601.6/km^{2}
286	Orono	Small	1,104	1,105	−0.1%	1.36	811.8/km^{2}
287	Alfred	Small	1,086	1,185	−8.4%	0.87	1,248.3/km^{2}
288	Barry's Bay	Small	1,084	1,259	−13.9%	2.25	481.8/km^{2}
289	Haliburton Village	Small	1,078	1,149	−6.2%	2.2	490.0/km^{2}
290	Tiny Beaches North	Small	1,065	922	+15.5%	2.28	467.1/km^{2}
291	Chalk River	Small	1,061	1,044	+1.6%	1.92	552.6/km^{2}
292	Paisley	Small	1,061	1,045	+1.5%	1.8	589.4/km^{2}
293	Kasabonika Lake	Small	1,060	849	+24.9%	1.13	938.1/km^{2}
294	Omemee	Small	1,060	1,271	−16.6%	2.12	500.0/km^{2}
295	Burford	Small	1,058	792	+33.6%	2.01	526.4/km^{2}
296	Havelock	Small	1,055	1,175	−10.2%	1.15	917.4/km^{2}
297	Thornton	Small	1,046	1,017	+2.9%	1.11	942.3/km^{2}
298	Merrickville	Small	1,036	1,016	+2.0%	2	518.0/km^{2}

== See also ==
- List of the largest population centres in Canada
- List of census agglomerations in Ontario
- List of census subdivisions in Ontario
- List of cities in Ontario
- List of communities in Ontario
- List of municipalities in Ontario
- List of towns in Ontario
- List of township municipalities in Ontario
- List of villages in Ontario
