= Isabelle Skalski =

Canadian politician

Ottawa City Councillor
- Incumbent
- Assumed office June 19, 2025
- Preceded by: George Darouze
- Constituency: Osgoode Ward

Personal details
- Spouse: Richard Popp
- Children: 4
- Education: Carleton University
- Occupation: Public servant

Isabelle Teresa Skalski (born c. 1981) is a politician in Ontario, Canada. She has served as the city councillor for Osgoode Ward on Ottawa City Council since 2025.

== Early life ==
Skalski is the daughter of Zofia and Tadeusz Skalski. In 2004, she graduated from Carleton University with a degree in public affairs and policy management. While attending Carleton, she served in the inaugural Ottawa Youth Cabinet, representing Orleans Ward.

== Career ==
After graduating university, Skalski worked as a public servant with the federal government, including working as a senior policy advisor with the Privy Council Office. She also worked for six years as a senior advisor at the Treasury Board of Canada Secretariat in Regulatory Affairs, and for Health Canada.

Skalski and her family moved to Greely in 2011. In 2022, she became president of the Greely community association. She is also was a member of the Greely Lions Club and a Scouts Canada leader.

Skalski was elected to Ottawa City Council in a by-election in June 2025 that was held to replace Osgoode Ward councillor George Darouze, who had been elected to the Legislative Assembly of Ontario in the 2025 Ontario general election. Skalski won 34 per cent of the vote, defeating 10 other candidates, including former Osgoode Township mayor and Ottawa city councillor Doug Thompson, who won 23 per cent of the vote. She ran on a platform of fixing local roads, funding core services, lower taxes and bureaucracy, and safer streets.
