= Osgoode Ward =

Osgoode
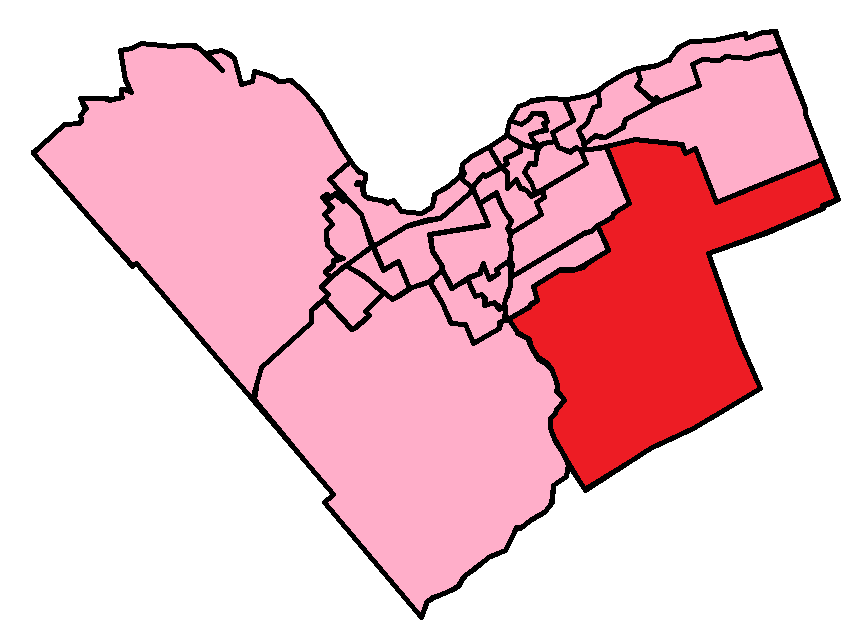
- Location within Ottawa
- Coordinates: 45°14′N 75°36′W
- Country: Canada
- Province: Ontario
- City: Ottawa

Government
  - Councillor: Isabelle Skalski

Population (2021)Canada 2021 Census
  - Total: 30,185

Languages (2016)
  - English: 81.1%
  - French: 12.2%
  - Italian: 1.1%

Osgoode Ward (Ward 20) is a municipal ward located in the rural southeast corner of the City of Ottawa. It mostly consists of the former Osgoode Township and parts of the former city of Gloucester and Cumberland. It has been represented on Ottawa City Council by Isabelle Skalski since her election in a by-election in June 2025.

The ward contains the communities of Greely, Osgoode, Metcalfe, Vars, Edwards, Carlsbad Springs, Kenmore, Vernon, South Gloucester, Ficko, Limebank, Johnston Corners and Piperville.

The ward was created for the 2000 municipal elections in preparation for Osgoode Township's amalgamation into the city of Ottawa. From 1994 to 2000, Osgoode Township was located in Cumberland-Osgoode Ward on the Regional Municipality of Ottawa-Carleton regional council. From 1969 to 1994 the mayor/reeve of the Township was the area's representative on regional council.

From 2000 to 2006, the ward consisted solely of the former Township of Osgoode. Beginning with the 2006 election, the boundaries changed to add much of rural southern Gloucester to the ward. And, beginning with the 2022 election, the ward expanded further to include more of rural Gloucester, plus southern and southwestern portions of the former Cumberland Township.

== Regional and city councillors ==
- Arnold Taylor (1969–1976) as reeve of Osgoode
- Albert Bouwers (1977–1994) as reeve/mayor of Osgoode
- Robert van den Ham (1994–2000) as regional councillor for Cumberland-Osgoode Ward
- Doug Thompson (2001–2014)
- George Darouze (2014–2025)
- Isabelle Skalski (2025–present)

== Election results ==
=== 1969 Ottawa-Carleton Regional Municipality elections ===
Reeve of Osgoode
Candidate	Votes	%
Arnold Taylor	Acclaimed	

=== 1972 Ottawa-Carleton Regional Municipality elections ===
Reeve of Osgoode
Candidate	Votes	%
Arnold Taylor	1,874	82.08
Jacques Lemay	409	17.92

=== 1974 Ottawa-Carleton Regional Municipality elections ===
Reeve of Osgoode
Candidate	Votes	%
Arnold Taylor	Acclaimed	

=== 1976 Ottawa-Carleton Regional Municipality elections ===
Reeve of Osgoode
Candidate	Votes	%
Al Bouwers	Acclaimed	

=== 1978 Ottawa-Carleton Regional Municipality elections ===
Reeve of Osgoode
Candidate	Votes	%
Al Bouwers	Acclaimed	

=== 1980 Ottawa-Carleton Regional Municipality elections ===
Reeve of Osgoode
Candidate	Votes	%
Al Bouwers	Acclaimed	

=== 1982 Ottawa-Carleton Regional Municipality elections ===
Mayor of Osgoode
Candidate	Votes	%
Al Bouwers	2,164	62.56
Barry Dawson	563	16.28
Philip McEvoy	491	14.19
Jim Pushinksy	241	6.97

=== 1985 Ottawa-Carleton Regional Municipality elections ===
Mayor of Osgoode
Candidate	Votes	%
Al Bouwers	Acclaimed	

=== 1988 Ottawa-Carleton Regional Municipality elections ===
Mayor of Osgoode
Candidate	Votes	%
Al Bouwers	2,548	51.10
Ron Stanley	1,240	24.87
Jan van der Veen	1,198	24.03

=== 1991 Ottawa-Carleton Regional Municipality elections ===
Mayor of Osgoode
Candidate	Votes	%
Al Bouwers	3,124	62.82
Ron Stanley	1,849	37.18

=== 1994 Ottawa-Carleton Regional Municipality elections ===
- As Cumberland-Osgoode Ward

Regional council
Candidate	Votes	%
Robert van den Ham	Acclaimed	

=== 1997 Ottawa-Carleton Regional Municipality elections ===
- As Cumberland-Osgoode ward

Regional council
Candidate	Votes	%
Robert van den Ham	4216	51.88
John Cyr	2939	36.16
John Geary	580	7.14
Daniel Bood	392	4.82

=== 2000 Ottawa municipal election ===
City council
Candidate	Votes	%
Doug Thompson	4034	56.29%
John Cyr	2027	28.28%
Dwayne Acres	1106	15.43%

=== 2003 Ottawa municipal election ===
City council
Candidate	Votes	%
Doug Thompson	ACCLAIMED	

=== 2006 Ottawa municipal election ===
City council
Candidate	Votes	%
Doug Thompson	7681	85.44
Robert Fowler	1309	14.56

Ottawa mayor (ward results)
Candidate	Votes	%
Larry O'Brien	6,354	69.98
Alex Munter	1,536	16.92
Bob Chiarelli	1,123	12.37
Jane Scharf	38	0.42
Piotr Anweiler	10	0.11
Barkley Pollock	10	0.11
Robert Larter	9	0.10

=== 2010 Ottawa municipal election ===
City council
Candidate	Votes	%
Doug Thompson	5393	67.26
Mark Scharfe	1873	23.36
Bob Masaro	752	9.38

Ottawa mayor (ward results)
Candidate	Votes	%
Larry O'Brien	3,039	37.81
Jim Watson	2,844	35.39
Clive Doucet	769	9.57
Andrew Haydon	768	9.56
Mike Maguire	441	5.49
Jane Scharf	48	0.60
Charlie Taylor	27	0.34
Robert G. Gauthier	22	0.27
Cesar Bello	15	0.19
Robin Lawrance	11	0.14
Samuel Wright	11	0.14
Sean Ryan	9	0.11
Joseph Furtenbacher	8	0.10
Daniel J. Lyrette	6	0.07
Julio Pita	6	0.07
Robert Larter	5	0.06
Fraser Liscumb	4	0.05
Idris Ben-Tahir	2	0.02
Vincent Libweshya	1	0.01
Michael St. Arnaud	1	0.01

=== 2014 Ottawa municipal election ===
City council
Candidate	Vote	%
George Darouze	1,783	21.06
George Wright	1,309	15.46
Jean Johnston-McKitterick	1,158	13.68
Liam Maguire	1,146	13.54
Tom Dawson	1,097	12.96
Davis Jermacans	1,064	12.57
Mark Scharfe	327	3.86
Kim Sheldrick	293	3.46
Bob Masaro	215	2.54
Paul St. Jean	45	0.53
Allen Scantland	28	0.33

Ottawa mayor (Ward results)
Candidate	Vote	%
Jim Watson	5,002	59.90
Mike Maguire	3,016	36.12
Rebecca Pyrah	90	1.08
Robert White	85	1.02
Darren W. Wood	78	0.93
Anwar Syed	33	0.40
Bernard Couchman	28	0.34
Michael St. Arnaud	18	0.22

=== 2018 Ottawa municipal election ===
City council
Candidate	Vote	%
George Darouze	4,653	54.86
Jay Tysick	2,694	31.76
Mark Scharfe	603	7.11
Kim Sheldrick	504	5.94
Auguste Banfalvi	28	0.33

Ottawa mayor (Ward results)
Candidate	Vote	%
Jim Watson (X)	6,149	75.32
Clive Doucet	1,394	17.07
Bruce McConville	155	1.90
Craig MacAulay	130	1.59
James T. Sheahan	84	1.03
Joey Drouin	64	0.78
Ryan Lythall	45	0.55
Moises Schachtler	37	0.45
Michael Pastien	31	0.38
Bernard Couchman	30	0.37
Ahmed Bouragba	24	0.29
Hamid Alakozai	21	0.26

=== 2022 Ottawa municipal election ===
City council
Candidate	Vote	%
George Darouze	4,353	40.81
Doug Thompson	4,115	38.58
Dan O'Brien	1,541	14.45
Bob Masaro	432	4.05
Bruce Anthony Faulkner	226	2.12

Ottawa mayor (Ward results)
Candidate	Vote	%
Mark Sutcliffe	7,771	74.69
Catherine McKenney	1,684	16.18
Bob Chiarelli	489	4.70
Mike Maguire	156	1.50
Nour Kadri	97	0.93
Graham MacDonald	59	0.57
Brandon Bay	37	0.36
Celine Debassige	31	0.30
Param Singh	22	0.21
Gregory Jreg Guevara	19	0.18
Ade Olumide	13	0.12
Jacob Solomon	12	0.12
Bernard Couchman	11	0.11
Zed Chebib	4	0.04

=== 2025 by-election ===
There was a by-election on June 16, 2025, to replace Darouze, who had been elected to the Legislative Assembly of Ontario earlier in the year.

Candidates

- Doug Thompson, former city councillor for Osgoode Ward, 2022 Ottawa municipal election candidate
- Colette Lacroix-Velthuis, retired IBM executive, farmer
- Dan O'Brien, 2022 Ottawa municipal election candidate. Entrepreneur, farmer.
- Isabelle Skalski, president of the Greely Community Association, Privy Council Office of Canada (on 6 months leave without pay for the election)
- Jennifer Van Koughnett, project manager, community health advocate. Carlsbad Springs resident.
- Bobby Gulati, mortgage agent
- Gregory Vail, project manager
- Arnold Vaughan
- Peter Scott Westaway, Independent candidate in Nepean in the 2025 Ontario general election. Nepean resident. Single issue candidate focused on the Ottawa Greenbelt
- Guy Clarence Boone, engineer, originally from Newfoundland.
- Dalton Holloway. Former assistant to Conservative MP Tom Kmiec.

Results

2025 Osgoode Ward By-election: June 16, 2025
Candidate	Popular vote			Expenditures
Candidate	Votes	%	±%	Expenditures
Isabelle Skalski	2,115	34.01	–	
Doug Thompson	1,405	22.60	-15.98	
Colette Lacroix-Velthuis	1,402	22.55	–	
Dan O'Brien	822	13.22	-1.23	
Gregory Vail	174	2.80	–	
Jennifer Van Koughnett	132	2.12	–	
Bobby Gulati	80	1.29	–	
Dalton Holloway	57	0.92	–	
Guy Clarence Boone	17	0.27	–	
Arnold Vaughan	9	0.14	–	
Peter Scott Westaway	5	0.08	–	
Total valid votes	6,223			
Total rejected, unmarked and declined votes				
Turnout		24.17	-21.99	
Eligible voters	25,742			
Note: Candidate campaign colours are based on the prominent colour used in campaign items (signs, literature, etc.) and are used as a visual differentiation between candidates.

=== 2026 Ottawa municipal election ===
2026 Ottawa municipal election: Osgoode
Candidate	Popular vote			Expenditures
Candidate	Votes	%	±%	Expenditures
Isabelle Skalski (X)	7,205	88.35		
Bruce Anthony Faulkner	950	11.65		
Total valid votes	8,343			
Total rejected, unmarked and declined votes				
Turnout		31.26		
Eligible voters	26,688			
Note: Candidate campaign colours are based on the prominent colour used in campaign items (signs, literature, etc.) and are used as a visual differentiation between candidates.
