= Gros Cap Indian Village 49A =

- Indian reserve
- Gros Cap Indian Village Indian Reserve No. 49A
- Location within Ontario
- Coordinates: 47°59′N 84°54′W
- Country: Canada
- Province: Ontario
- District: Algoma
- First Nation: Michipicoten

Area
  - Land: 0.05 km^{2} (0.019 sq mi)

Gros Cap Indian Village 49A is a First Nations reserve which is surrounded by Wawa, Ontario, but almost borders Gros Cap 49. It is one of the reserves of the Michipicoten First Nation.
