= Metcalfe, Ontario =

Metcalfe
- Community
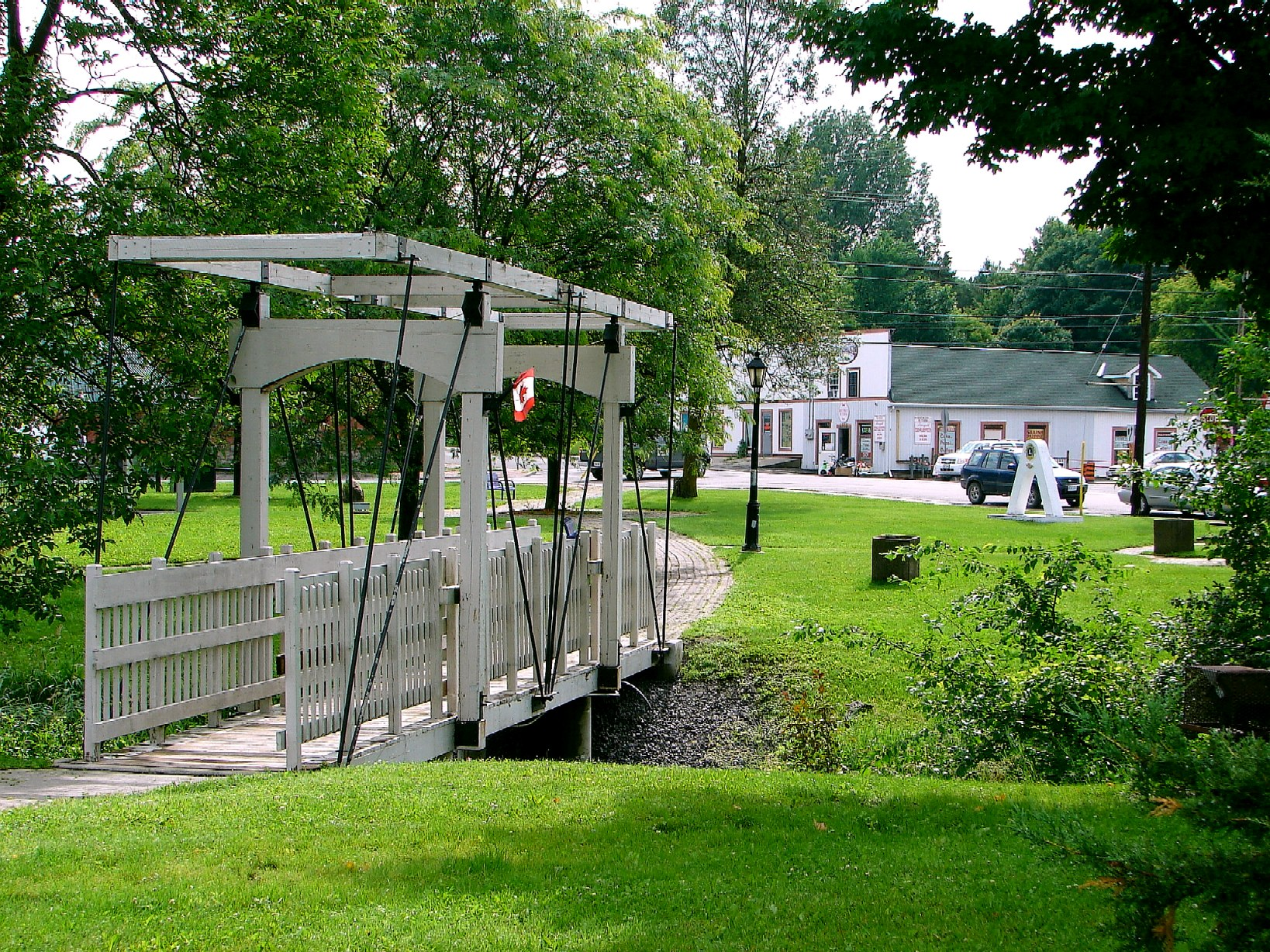

- Location in Ottawa
- Coordinates: 45°14′9″N 75°28′23″W
- Country: Canada
- Province: Ontario
- City: Ottawa
- Established: 1827
- Incorporated: 1898 (Police Village of Metcalfe)
- Annexation: 1974 (Township of Osgoode); 2001 (City of Ottawa)

Government
  - Mayor: Mark Sutcliffe
  - MPs: Bruce Fanjoy
  - MPPs: George Darouze
  - Councillors: Isabelle Skalski

Area
  - Total: 2.17 km^{2} (0.84 sq mi)
- Elevation: 90 m (300 ft)

Population (2016)
  - Total: 1,776
  - Density: 818/km^{2} (2,120/sq mi)
- Canada 2016 Census
- Time zone: UTC−5 (Eastern (EST))
  - Summer (DST): UTC−4 (EDT)

Metcalfe is a population centre located in Osgoode Ward, in the rural south-end of the city of Ottawa, Ontario, Canada. Prior to amalgamation in 2001, the community was in Osgoode Township. According to the Canada 2016 Census, it has a population of 1,776.

== History ==
Colonel Archibald Macdonell, believed by some to be the first settler in Osgoode Township, settled just south of the current location of Metcalfe in March 1827. The village was originally called Hawley’s Corners, but in 1877 it was renamed to Metcalfe in honour of Charles Theophilus Metcalfe, Governor General of Canada from 1843 to 1846.

In its early days, Metcalfe was a stop on the stagecoach route from Ottawa (known at the time as Bytown) to Cornwall. The village of Metcalfe was bypassed in the construction of railway lines, limiting its further growth. The railway line to Cornwall passed to the east, through the town of Russell, while another to Prescott passed to the west through Osgoode Village.

By 1866, Metcalfe was a post village with a population of 250 of the township of Osgoode, nine miles from the Osgoode station on the Ottawa and Prescott Railway, and twenty miles from Ottawa. The village contained four general stores, an ashery, one wagon shop, five boot and shoe shops, and three carpenters. The 6th Division Court was held here, at the Victoria Hall. It contained the Metcalfe grammar school, and a common school; three churches, the Church of England, the Free Church of Scotland, and the Wesleyan Methodist. The Loyal Orange Lodge No. 205, met on the second Tuesday in each month while No. 688, met on the first Tuesday in each month.

In the fall of 2008, parts of Metcalfe were used as sets in the filming of the Syfy television film Carny.

== Schools ==
- Metcalfe Public School
- St. Catherine Catholic School
- Community Christian School
- Osgoode Township High School - The only high school in the township of Osgoode.

== Sports ==
The village is home to various sports facilities, most notably the Metcalfe Community Centre which bears the name of former Montreal Canadiens all-star defenceman Larry Robinson. The Centre's arena houses the local Junior C hockey team: the Metcalfe Jets. Notable Jets alumni include Larry Robinson and two of his brothers, as well as Boston Bruins' Marc Savard. It also hosts the Metcalfe skating club for figure skating and canskate.

The small community also boasts the home to one golf course (Metcalfe Golf Club), seven baseball fields, a tennis court, curling club, and various soccer fields.

== Today ==
The village today serves largely as a residential community for the City of Ottawa. The local agricultural fair, the Metcalfe Fair, has been held each fall since 1856.
