= Doug Thompson =

Canadian politician

Ottawa City Councillor
- In office January 1, 2001 – December 1, 2014
- Preceded by: Position created
- Succeeded by: George Darouze
- Constituency: Osgoode Ward

Acting Mayor of Ottawa
- In office July 8, 2009 – August 6, 2009
- Preceded by: Michel Bellemare (acting)
- Succeeded by: Larry O'Brien

Mayor of Osgoode Township
- In office December 1, 1997 – December 31, 2000
- Preceded by: Lloyd Cranston
- Succeeded by: position abolished

Osgoode Township Councillor
- In office December 1, 1980 – December 1, 1985
- Preceded by: Philip McEvoy
- Succeeded by: Blaine Ball
- In office December 1, 1988 – December 1, 1997
- Preceded by: Mary Cooper, Fred Alexander
- Succeeded by: George Wright, Carol Parker

Personal details
- Born: August 1946
- Political party: Ontario Progressive Conservative Party
- Spouse: Mary Lynne Levoy (m. 2005)

Douglas Thompson was a councillor in the city of Ottawa for the Osgoode Ward. Thompson was also the former mayor of Osgoode Township prior to the amalgamation with the new City of Ottawa. Prior to being mayor of Osgoode, Thompson was a municipal councillor in the township for 14 years.

Prior to entering politics, Thompson was a teacher for 35 years before retiring. He lives in the community of Greely where he has lived since 1967. He has coached minor hockey and baseball.

He graduated from Carleton University, with a degree in History and Political Science.

Thompson served as acting mayor of Ottawa for one month in 2009 while mayor Larry O'Brien took a leave of absence to deal with a criminal investigation.

== Electoral history ==
Thompson was elected as mayor of Osgoode in the 1997 elections, defeating Jim Waddell and the incumbent mayor Lloyd Cranston. Osgoode was amalgamated into Ottawa in 2001. In the first municipal elections for the amalgamated city, held in 2000, Thompson won a majority of the vote, defeating John Cyr and Dwayne Acres. In the 2003 election he was acclaimed. In 2006, Thompson won in a landslide, defeating Robert Fowler with 85% of the vote. Of all the winning candidates of the 2006 municipal elections, Thompson had the highest percentage of donations coming from corporations (81.9%). In 2010, Thompson won two thirds of the vote in his ward, defeating Mark Scharfe and Bob Masaro. Thompson had planned on retiring, but was coaxed to run again. He did not run again in the 2014 elections.

Thompson had intended to run provincially for the Ontario Progressive Conservative Party in the new riding of Carleton for the 2018 Ontario general election but dropped out.

In the 2022 Municipal Election for the City of Ottawa, Doug Thompson lost in an attempt to return to city council.

In June 2025, he ran in a by-election in Osgoode Ward, which was held to replace George Darouze. In the by-election, he finished second with 22.6% of the vote, losing to Isabelle Skalski.

Preceded by Lloyd Cranston	Mayors of Osgoode Township; 1997-2000	Succeeded by Position abolished
Preceded by None, ward amalgamated into Ottawa in 2000	City councillors from Osgoode Ward; 2001-2014	Succeeded by George Darouze
