= OTHS =

OTHS may refer to:

- Oakville Trafalgar High School
- Obra D. Tompkins High School
- O'Fallon Township High School
- Osgoode Township High School
- Ottawa Technical High School
- Ottawa Township High School
- Northern Valley Regional High School at Old Tappan
