= Chapleau 74A =

- Indian reserve
- Chapleau Indian Reserve No. 74A
- Location within Ontario
- Coordinates: 47°48′N 83°23′W
- Country: Canada
- Province: Ontario
- District: Sudbury
- First Nation: Chapleau Ojibway

Area
  - Land: 7.63 km^{2} (2.95 sq mi)

Population (2011)
  - Total: 31
  - Density: 4.1/km^{2} (11/sq mi)
- Website: chapleauojibwe.ca

Chapleau 74A is a First Nations reserve located near Chapleau, Ontario. It is one of several reserves of the Chapleau Ojibway First Nation.
