= CFJW-FM =

Emergency alert radio station in Ontario, Canada

Coordinates: 47.84408°N 83.40417°W

- Chapleau, Ontario; Canada
- Frequency: 93.7 MHz

Programming
- Format: emergency alert

Ownership
- Owner: Allan Pellow

History
- First air date: 2000

Technical information
- Licensing authority: CRTC
- Class: LP
- ERP: 50 watts
- HAAT: 22.8 metres (75 ft)

CFJW-FM is an emergency alert radio station that operates at 93.7 FM in Chapleau, Ontario, Canada.

Licensed to Allan Pellow, the township's chief administrative officer, the station was given approval by the Canadian Radio-television and Telecommunications Commission in 1999. The station broadcasts only when the township of Chapleau needs to announce emergency information — in the event of such an emergency, residents are alerted to tune to the station by the continuous activation of the fire department's truck sirens.

The township chose to launch the system because Chapleau has no radio stations operating locally. Apart from CFJW, all of the township's broadcast media service is provided by rebroadcasters of stations from Sudbury, Timmins or Wawa.

In November 2013, CFJW-FM was among many low-powered tourist information stations granted an exemption by the CRTC.
