= Chapleau 61 =

- Indian reserve
- Chapleau Indian Reserve No. 61
- Location within Ontario
- Coordinates: 47°50′N 83°23′W
- Country: Canada
- Province: Ontario
- District: Sudbury
- First Nation: Michipicoten

Area
  - Land: 0.89 km^{2} (0.34 sq mi)

Chapleau 61 is a First Nations reserve close to Chapleau, Ontario. It is one of the reserves of the Michipicoten First Nation.
