= Missanabie 62 =

- Indian reserve
- Missanabie Indian Reserve No. 62
- Location within Ontario
- Coordinates: 48°18′N 84°06′W
- Country: Canada
- Province: Ontario
- District: Algoma
- First Nation: Michipicoten

Area
  - Land: 0.87 km^{2} (0.34 sq mi)

Missanabie 62 is a First Nations reserve in Algoma District, Ontario. It is one of the reserves of the Michipicoten First Nation.
