= Vernon, Ontario =

Vernon
- Rural community
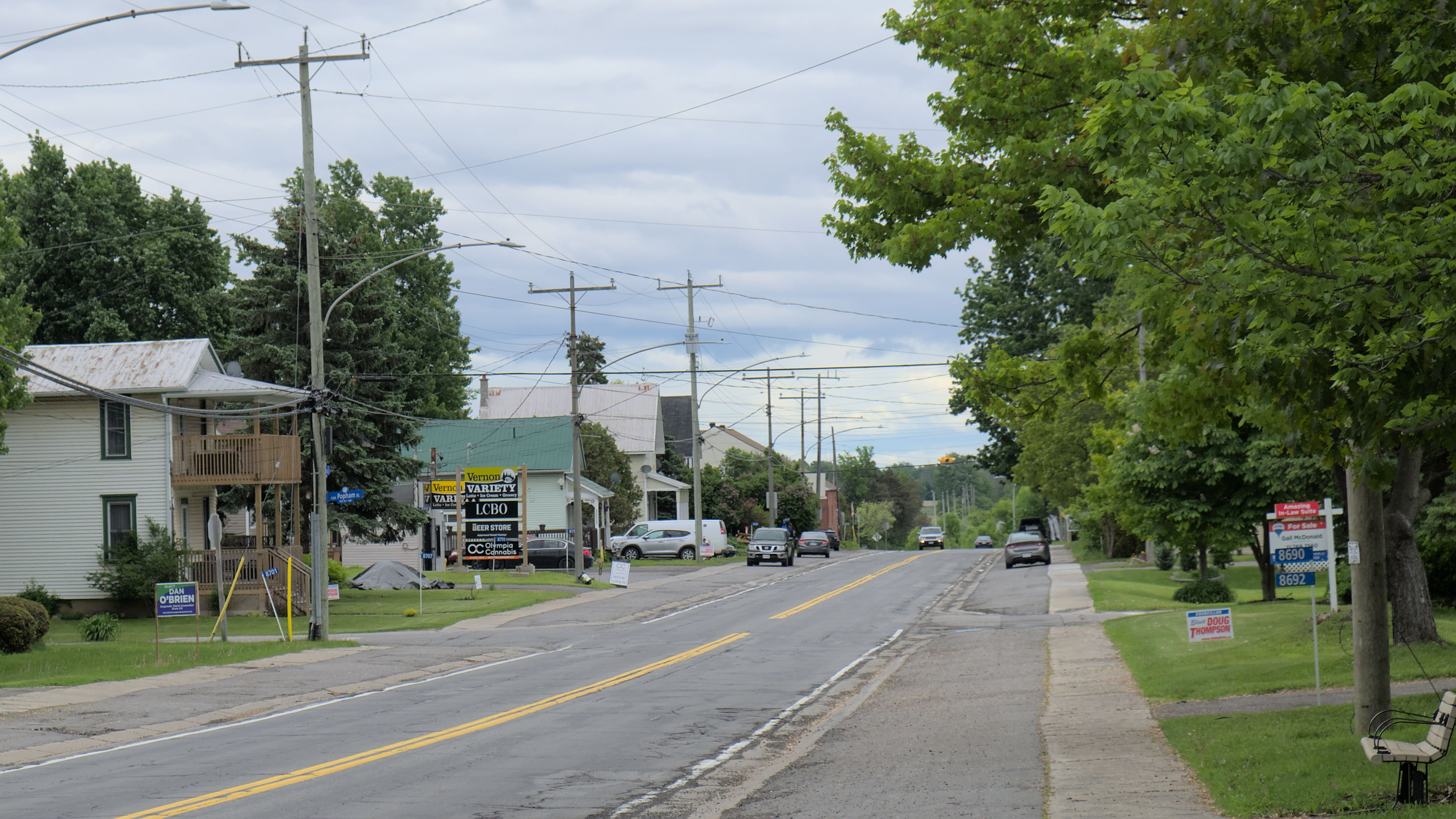
- Looking south along Bank Street
- Interactive map of Vernon
- Coordinates: 45.16082°N 75.4621°W
- Country: Canada
- Province: Ontario
- City: Ottawa

Government
  - Mayor: Mark Sutcliffe
  - MP: Bruce Fanjoy
  - MPP: George Darouze
  - Councillors: Vacant
- Elevation: 80 m (260 ft)

Population (2011)
  - Total: 750
- Canada 2011 Census
- Time zone: UTC−5 (Eastern (EST))
  - Summer (DST): UTC−4 (EDT)
- Postal code: K0A3J0

Vernon is a compact rural community in Osgoode Ward in the southern part of the city of Ottawa, Ontario, Canada. Prior to amalgamation in 2001, Vernon was located in Osgoode Township.

According to the Canada 2011 Census, the surrounding blocks had a population of 750.

== Churches and Temple ==
- Osgoode Baptist Church
- Osgoode Presbyterian Church
- St. George's Anglican Church
- Vernon United Church
- Canada Ottawa Amitabha

== Library ==
The Vernon branch of the Ottawa Public Library makes its home in an 1882 heritage building that was the community's one-room schoolhouse. It was recently renovated to have a new washroom and bell tower. The library has a wheelchair ramp.

== Museum ==
Vernon is the home of the Osgoode Township Museum. It was founded in 1973 by a group of dedicated senior citizens working with a New Horizons grant. The collection has grown tremendously, and the Museum is now housed in two buildings with over 10,000 square feet (930 m^{2}) of display space. The large body of archival material and artifacts reflects the agricultural history of the Township of Osgoode.

== Post Office ==
Effective Oct 1, 2017, Vernon has no post office. Residents collect their mail in Community Mail Boxes (CMBs) dispersed throughout the village. Items that are too large for the CMBs are brought to the post office in Metcalfe, north of Vernon. Formerly, the Vernon post office was located in the old Ford Motor dealership.
