= Chapleau 61A =

- Indian reserve
- Chapleau Indian Reserve No. 61A
- Location within Ontario
- Coordinates: 47°50′N 83°23′W
- Country: Canada
- Province: Ontario
- District: Sudbury
- First Nation: Chapleau Ojibway

Area
  - Land: 0.67 km^{2} (0.26 sq mi)

Chapleau 61A is a First Nations reserve close to Chapleau, Ontario. It is one of the reserves of the Chapleau Ojibway First Nation.
