= Project Chapleau =

Project Chapleau was a Wi-Fi internet connection that covered the entire town of Chapleau, Ontario, Canada. It was the first of its kind in Canada.

It was a Wireless mesh Internet technology designed and implemented through a partnership between Bell Canada Enterprises, Nortel Networks, and the Township of Chapleau. The project began on November 9, 2005, and had a one-year trial.

Researchers from Nipissing University in North Bay, Ontario, conducted an investigation to illustrate any existing influences this influx of computer technology may have on the educational community.

An analysis of the impact of high-speed internet on the residents and town of Chapleau was published in 2010 by University of Toronto sociologists Jessica Collins and Barry Wellman.
