= Chapleau Centennial Museum =

Coordinates: 47.8411°N 83.4035°W

- Established: 1 July 1967
- Location: Chapleau, Ontario, Canada
- Type: Local history museum

The Chapleau Centennial Museum is a local history museum in Chapleau, Ontario, Canada. It commemorates the town's local and railway history. The monuments on display represent important aspects of the town's history and identity, such as railway workers and the Canadian Pacific Railway; First Nations, Franco-Ontarian and Anglo-Canadian peoples; and the timber industry.

Opened on the Canadian Centennial (July 1, 1967), its most visible artifact is the 275 ton locomotive steam engine on display parallel to Elm Street.

The Museum was built almost entirely with donated materials. Local newspaper reports showed lumber donations by local mills, rocks gathered from local rock cuts, and cash donations from many individuals.
