= Chapleau Cree Fox Lake =

- Indian reserve
- Chapleau Cree Fox Lake Indian Reserve
- Location within Ontario
- Coordinates: 47°49′N 83°27′W
- Country: Canada
- Province: Ontario
- District: Sudbury
- First Nation: Chapleau Cree

Area
  - Land: 10.17 km^{2} (3.93 sq mi)

Chapleau Cree Fox Lake (Cree: ᔓᑊᓗ ᐠᕆ ᒪᑫᔑᐤ ᓴᑲᐃᑲᐣ, "shaplo kri makishiw sakahikan") is a First Nations reserve close to Chapleau, Ontario, Canada. It is one of the reserves of the Chapleau Cree First Nation.

== Chiefs ==
- Keith Corston (present)
- Michael Cahagee

== See also ==
- List of francophone communities in Ontario
