= Adélard Lafrance =

Canadian ice hockey player

- Born: January 13, 1913 Chapleau, Ontario, Canada
- Died: June 19, 1995 (aged 82) North Bay, Ontario, Canada
- Height: 5 ft 10 in (178 cm)
- Weight: 165 lb (75 kg; 11 st 11 lb)
- Position: Left wing
- Shot: Left
- Played for: Montreal Canadiens
- Playing career: 1931–1939

Adélard Henry "Adie, Del" Lafrance (January 13, 1913 – June 19, 1995) was a Canadian professional ice hockey player. He played three games in the National Hockey League for the Montreal Canadiens during the 1933–34 season. The rest of his career, which lasted from 1931 to 1939, was spent in minor professional leagues.

== Playing career ==
Born in Chapleau, Ontario, in 1913, Lafrance joined the Sudbury St. Louis of the Nickel Belt Hockey League in 1929–30. The following season he moved to the Sudbury Cub Wolves in time for the playoffs and Memorial Cup play. The following season he split between the St. Louis and the Wolves, and played in Memorial Cup and Allan Cup playoffs. That season, 1931–32, the Wolves were the Memorial Cup champions. He played one final season for the Wolves before joining the professional Falconbridge in 1933–34. In March 1934, he joined the Montreal Canadiens and played three games in the season and two in the playoffs without scoring a goal. The following season he was with the Quebec Castors of the Can-Am league. He played one season for Quebec before joining the Springfield Indians for four seasons. He left competitive hockey after the 1938–39 season and he returned to Sudbury to join the family business, A. Lafrance & Son's Furriers LTD.

== Career statistics ==
=== Regular season and playoffs ===
| | | | Regular season | | | | | Playoffs |
| Season | Team | League | GP | G | A | Pts | PIM | GP | G | A | Pts | PIM |
|---|---|---|---|---|---|---|---|---|---|---|---|---|
| 1929–30 | Sudbury St. Louis | NOJHA | 8 | 4 | 1 | 5 | 0 | — | — | — | — | — |
| 1930–31 | Sudbury Cub-Wolves | NOJHA | — | — | — | — | — | 1 | 0 | 0 | 0 | 0 |
| 1930–31 | Sudbury St. Louis | NOJHA | 8 | 4 | 1 | 5 | 4 | 3 | 4 | 0 | 4 | 0 |
| 1930–31 | Sudbury Cub Wolves | M-Cup | — | — | — | — | — | 5 | 2 | 1 | 3 | 2 |
| 1930–31 | Sudbury Wolves | Al-Cup | — | — | — | — | — | 3 | 2 | 0 | 2 | 2 |
| 1931–32 | Falconbridge Falcons | NOHA | 9 | 3 | 4 | 7 | 2 | 2 | 0 | 0 | 0 | 0 |
| 1931–32 | Sudbury Wolves | NOHA | 3 | 2 | 0 | 2 | 0 | — | — | — | — | — |
| 1932–33 | Sudbury Wolves | NOHA | 7 | 4 | 2 | 6 | 10 | 2 | 1 | 0 | 1 | 2 |
| 1933–34 | Montreal Canadiens | NHL | 3 | 0 | 0 | 0 | 2 | 2 | 0 | 0 | 0 | 0 |
| 1933–34 | Falconbridge Falcons | NOHA | 8 | 5 | 1 | 6 | 12 | 2 | 1 | 0 | 1 | 2 |
| 1934–35 | Quebec Castors | Can-Am | 46 | 4 | 4 | 8 | 10 | 3 | 0 | 0 | 0 | 2 |
| 1935–36 | Springfield Indians | Can-Am | 48 | 13 | 19 | 32 | 32 | 3 | 2 | 3 | 5 | 4 |
| 1936–37 | Springfield Indians | IAHL | 33 | 9 | 10 | 19 | 13 | — | — | — | — | — |
| 1937–38 | Springfield Indians | IAHL | 41 | 8 | 13 | 21 | 17 | — | — | — | — | — |
| 1938–39 | Springfield Indians | IAHL | 54 | 11 | 26 | 37 | 23 | 2 | 0 | 0 | 0 | 0 |
| IAHL totals | | | 128 | 28 | 49 | 77 | 53 | 2 | 0 | 0 | 0 | 0 |
| NHL totals | | | 3 | 0 | 0 | 0 | 2 | 2 | 0 | 0 | 0 | 0 |
