= Chapleau 74 =

- Indian reserve
- Chapleau Indian Reserve No. 74
- Location within Ontario
- Coordinates: 47°50′N 83°23′W
- Country: Canada
- Province: Ontario
- District: Sudbury
- First Nation: Chapleau Ojibway

Area
  - Land: 0.65 km^{2} (0.25 sq mi)

Chapleau 74 is a First Nations reserve close to Chapleau, Ontario. It is one of the reserves of the Chapleau Ojibway First Nation.
