= Chapleau 75 =

- Indian reserve
- Chapleau Indian Reserve No. 75
- Location within Ontario
- Coordinates: 47°51′N 83°22′W
- Country: Canada
- Province: Ontario
- District: Sudbury
- First Nation: Chapleau Cree

Area
  - Land: 1.15 km^{2} (0.44 sq mi)

Population (2011)
  - Total: 79
  - Density: 68.7/km^{2} (178/sq mi)
- Website: chapleaucree.ca

Chapleau 75 is a First Nations reserve located near Chapleau, Ontario. It is one of two reserves of the Chapleau Cree First Nation.
