= Kenmore, Ontario =

Kenmore
- Community
- Location in Ottawa
- Coordinates: 45°13′54.3″N 75°25′0.55″W
- Country: Canada
- Province: Ontario
- City: Ottawa
- Established: 1830
- Incorporated: 1910 (Police Village of North Gower)
- Amalgamation: 1974 (Township of Osgoode); 2001 (City of Ottawa)

Government
  - Mayor: Mark Sutcliffe
  - MPs: Bruce Fanjoy
  - MPPs: George Darouze
  - Councillors: Vacant
- Elevation: 75 m (246 ft)

Population (2011)
  - Total: 501
- Canada 2011 Census
- Time zone: UTC−5 (Eastern (EST))
  - Summer (DST): UTC−4 (EDT)

Kenmore is a rural community in Osgoode Ward in the southeastern corner of the City of Ottawa, Ontario, Canada. Prior to amalgamation in 2001, it was located in Osgoode Township. It consists of two small residential neighbourhoods and farmland. Notable features include Kenmore Bicentennial Park, Kenmore Community Centre, and the Castor River, a tributary of the South Nation River. According to the Canada 2011 Census, the population of the surrounding blocks was 501.

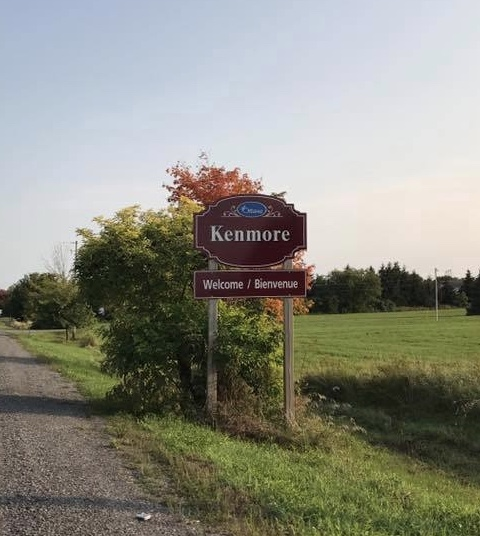
Kenmore, Ontario

Significant local events include the Royal Canadian Legion honouring of war dead with a Remembrance Service every November at the Kenmore cenotaph. There is a Kenmore Women's Institute, and the Kenmore Community Association meets regularly at Kenmore Hall.

== History ==
The site of the town hall was settled in 1830 by former Rideau Canal construction worker John McDonald. The village was first settled in 1840, and laid out by Peter McLaren. The post office was established in 1853, with Archibald Dewar appointed postmaster.

In 1857 the citizens asked resident Squire Peter McLaren to choose between "Glen Lyon" and "Kenmore" as the village name. He chose Kenmore for his home in Perthshire, Scotland.

The Carkner Mill (a sawmill) was built on the banks of the Castor River in 1857. It was enlarged in 1883 to manufacture cheese boxes. At its zenith, the mill employed 30 people and used logs driven down the Castor River.

By 1866, Kenmore was a post village with a population of about 80 of the township of Osgoode, on the Castor creek; the postmaster was Moses E. Tabid. It contained three stores, one flouring and saw mill, pearl ash factory and tannery. There was one church, Baptist, erected in 1851, of frame. The citizens included Mr Cowan, general merchant; Donald I McArthur, blacksmith; Michael Gillesia, general merchant & potash manufacturer; and John McDiarmid, flour and saw mill proprietor.

In 1900, a former resident of Kenmore Ontario, John McMaster, leased land at the north end of Lake Washington in Washington State, USA. He started a sawmill and shingle operation on Jan 1, 1901. He named the area Kenmore, Washington after his former home of Kenmore, Ontario, registering the name with the State of Washington on January 10, 1901.
