= Castor River (Ontario) =

Coordinates: 45°17′58″N 75°06′33″W

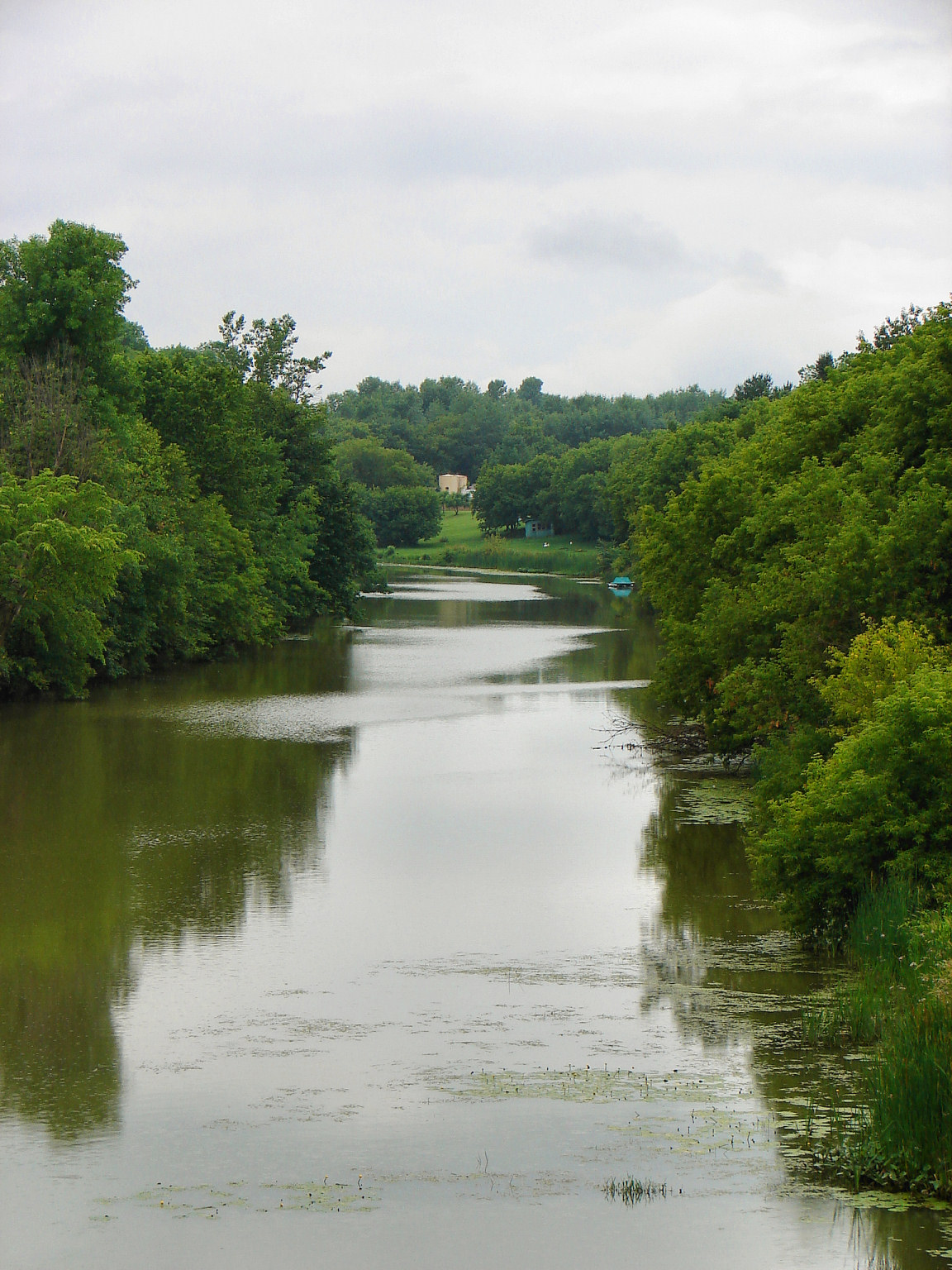
- Castor River in Embrun

Location
- Country: Canada
- Province: Ontario

Physical characteristics
- Length: 24 km (15 mi)

The Castor River is a river in Eastern Ontario, in Canada. It flows from Russell, Ontario into the South Nation River near Casselman. It has a number of branches, including the North, Middle, South and East Castor Rivers which join in Embrun. The river was named for the many beaver dams found in its watershed; "castor" means "beaver" in French.

== Communities ==
- Russell
- Embrun
- Forest Park
- Kenmore

== See also ==
- List of rivers of Ontario
