= Gros Cap 49 =

- Indian reserve
- Gros Cap Indian Reserve No. 49
- Location within Ontario
- Coordinates: 48°00′N 84°54′W
- Country: Canada
- Province: Ontario
- District: Algoma
- First Nation: Michipicoten

Area
  - Land: 34.57 km^{2} (13.35 sq mi)

Population (2011)
  - Total: 68
  - Density: 2/km^{2} (5.2/sq mi)
- Time zone: UTC-5 (EST)
  - Summer (DST): UTC-4 (EDT)
- Website: www.michipicoten.com

Gros Cap 49 is a First Nations reserve located near Wawa, Ontario. It is one of four reserves of the Michipicoten First Nation.
