= Edwards, Ontario =

Coordinates: 45.3231°N 75.4670°W

Edwards
- Dispersed rural community
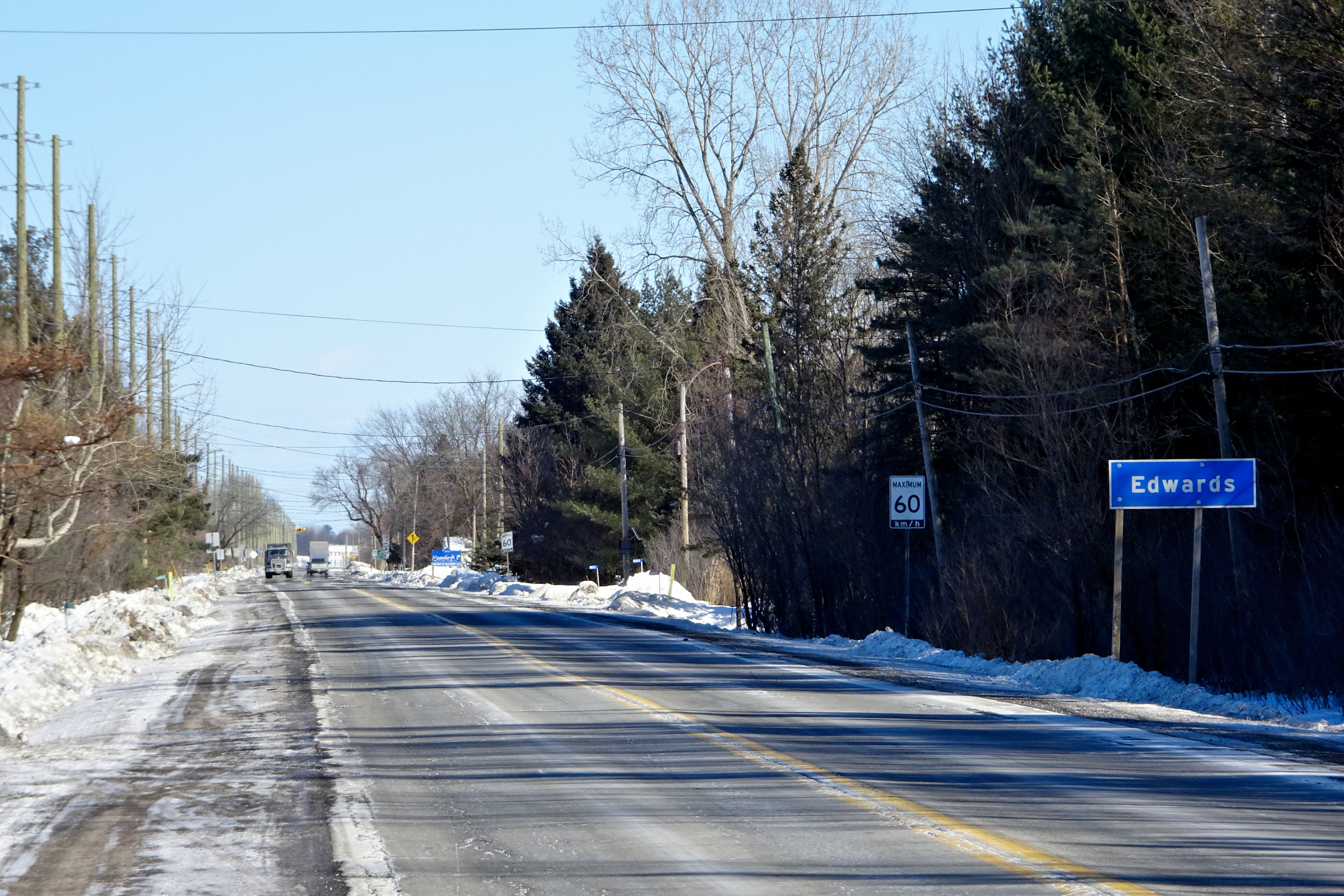
- Mitch Owens Road at Edwards
- Interactive map of Edwards
- Country: Canada
- Province: Ontario
- City: Ottawa
- Ward: Osgoode Ward
- Named: 1901

Population (2011)
  - Total: 346
- Surrounding census blocks

Edwards is a dispersed rural community at the headwaters of Bear Brook in the Osgoode Ward of Ottawa, Ontario, Canada. According to the Canada 2011 Census, the surrounding blocks had a population of 346.

Edwards was named in 1901 after William Cameron Edwards (1844–1921). Edwards was a lumberman, MP for Russell 1887 -1903 and a senator. From 1898 to 1957 Edwards was a flag stop for the New York and Ottawa Railway. New York Central Railway with a station and siding and telegraph operator were here until the tracks were torn up in 1957.

Edwards has many small businesses golf courses and auto mechanics, and has had their own Post Office. The post office has been in the same family since around 1900.

There is a city run park and an Orange Lodge and now there is a solar farm at Parkway and Yorks Corners roads.
