= Michipicoten First Nation =

First Nation government in Northern Ontario, Canada

- Band No. 225
- Mishibikwadinaang
- People: Ojibwe
- Treaty: Robinson Superior
- Headquarters: 107 Hiawatha Drive, Gros Cap 49
- Province: Ontario

Land
- Main reserve: Gros Cap 49
- Reserves: Chapleau 61; Gros Cap Indian Village 49A; Missanabie 62
- Land area: 36.966 km^{2} (14.273 sq mi)

Population (2016)
- On reserve: 63
- On other land: 1
- Off reserve: 1319
- Total population: 1383

Government
- Chief: Chad Edgar
- Council: Irene Catherine Armstrong; Sandra Ann Donney-Fraser; Chad Edgar; Christine Verna Marie Kakapshe Lewis; Genevieve Linda Peterson; Evelyn Stone

Tribal Council
- Anishinabek Nation

Website
- https://michipicoten.com/

Michipicoten First Nation (Ojibwe: Mishibikwadinaang, locally pronounced as Michipigodong) is an Ojibway First Nation band government in Northern Ontario, located near Wawa. Members of the community have lived at the mouth of the Michipicoten River since before the first arrival of European settlers to the area. Their reserves include Chapleau 61, Gros Cap 49, Gros Cap Indian Village 49A and Missanabie 62.

The Michipicoten went through several forced moves during the 19th and 20th centuries, causing significant disruption to the community. Members of the First Nation concluded a historic land agreement with the governments of Canada and Ontario in January 2008, after a successful referendum.

== Notable members ==
- Chris Simon, ice hockey player, Stanley Cup winner with the 1996 Colorado Avalanche
