= Chapleau Cree First Nation =

First Nation band in Ontario, Canada

Coordinates: 47°48′50″N 83°26′50″W

- Band No. 221
- Location within Ontario
- People: Cree
- Treaty: Treaty 9
- Headquarters: Chapleau
- Province: Ontario

Land
- Main reserve: Chapleau Cree Fox Lake
- Reserve: Chapleau 75
- Land area: 11.249 km^{2} (4.343 sq mi)

Population (October 2019)
- On reserve: 95
- On other land: 4
- Off reserve: 724
- Total population: 819

Government
- Chief: Keith Corston
- Council: William Cachagee; Margaret Coulter; James Fletcher; Helen White

Tribal Council
- Mushkegowuk Council

Website
- http://chapleaucree.ca/

Chapleau Cree First Nation (Cree: ᔕᑊᓗ ᐃᓂᓂᐗᐠ, šaplo ininiwak) is a Mushkegowuk Cree First Nation located by Chapleau Township, Sudbury District, Ontario, Canada. The First Nation have reserved for themselves the 108.1 hectares (267 acres) Chapleau 75 Indian Reserve and the 1,016.8 hectares (2,513 acres) Chapleau Cree Fox Lake Indian Reserve. As of 2019, their on-reserve population was 57 compared to 2011 with 79 and 2006 with 92.

The flag of the tribe bears the text in Cree: "ᔓᑊᓗ ᐠᕆ ᒪᑫᔑᐤ ᓴᑲᐃᑲᐣ" ("šaplo kri makishiw sakahikan"), which refers to its main reserve, Chapleau Cree Fox Lake.

Chapleau Cree First Nation is policed by the Nishnawbe-Aski Police Service, an Aboriginal-based service.

== Governance ==
The First Nation is led by a Chief and five Councillors. Chapleau Cree First Nation is member of Mushkegowuk Council, a regional tribal council affiliated with the Nishnawbe Aski Nation.
