= Chapleau Ojibway First Nation =

Human settlement in Ontario, Canada

Coordinates: 47°48′25″N 83°23′28″W

Chapleau Ojibway First Nation is an Ojibwa First Nation located near Chapleau Township, Sudbury District, Ontario, Canada. The First Nation have reserved for themselves the 67 ha Chapleau 61A Indian Reserve, 64.7 ha Chapleau 74 Indian Reserve and the 799.3 ha Chapleau 74A Indian Reserve. In September, 2007, their total registered population 39, of which their on-reserve population was 30 (24 on their main Reserve).

== History ==
The people of Chapleau Ojibwe First Nation live on the only Ojibwa-language reserve in the Chapleau area. Their historical kinship and relationship with the land therefore draws them west to the shores of Lake Superior and south to the shores of Lake Huron, rather than north into Cree territory to the shores of James Bay. As such, much of their traditional territory was ceded to the Crown under the 1850 Robinson Treaties. These treaties cover all land whose waters drain into the north shores of lakes Huron and Superior. Chapleau Ojibwe forefathers were not, however, signatories to the Robinson Treaties, partly because William Benjamin Robinson did not take the time to meet with inland First Nation communities and partly because inland First Nation leaders were reluctant to travel as a result of a cholera outbreak in 1849.

After visiting Chapleau in 1905, the Treaty 9 commissioners reported that it would not be necessary to negotiate a treaty with the Indian people of Chapleau as they belonged to bands residing at Moose Factory, English River and other places already under treaty. Treaty 9 covers all land in the Chapleau are that drains north into James Bay. Since large reserves had already been established in other parts of the province for the bands from which people at Chapleau had immigrated, the commissioners recommended that a small area be set aside for Chapleau Ojibwe so that they could build small houses and cultivate garden plots. The Chapleau Ojibway Reserve was established in 1950.

== Governance ==
The First Nation is led by Chief Anita Stephens and two Councillors: Johanne Wesley and Joshua Memegos. Chapleau Ojibway First Nation is member of Wabun Tribal Council, a regional tribal council affiliated with the Nishnawbe Aski Nation.

Chapleau Ojibway First Nation is policed by the Nishnawbe-Aski Police Service, an Aboriginal-based service.
