= George Darouze =

Canadian politician (born 1964)

George Darouze MPP
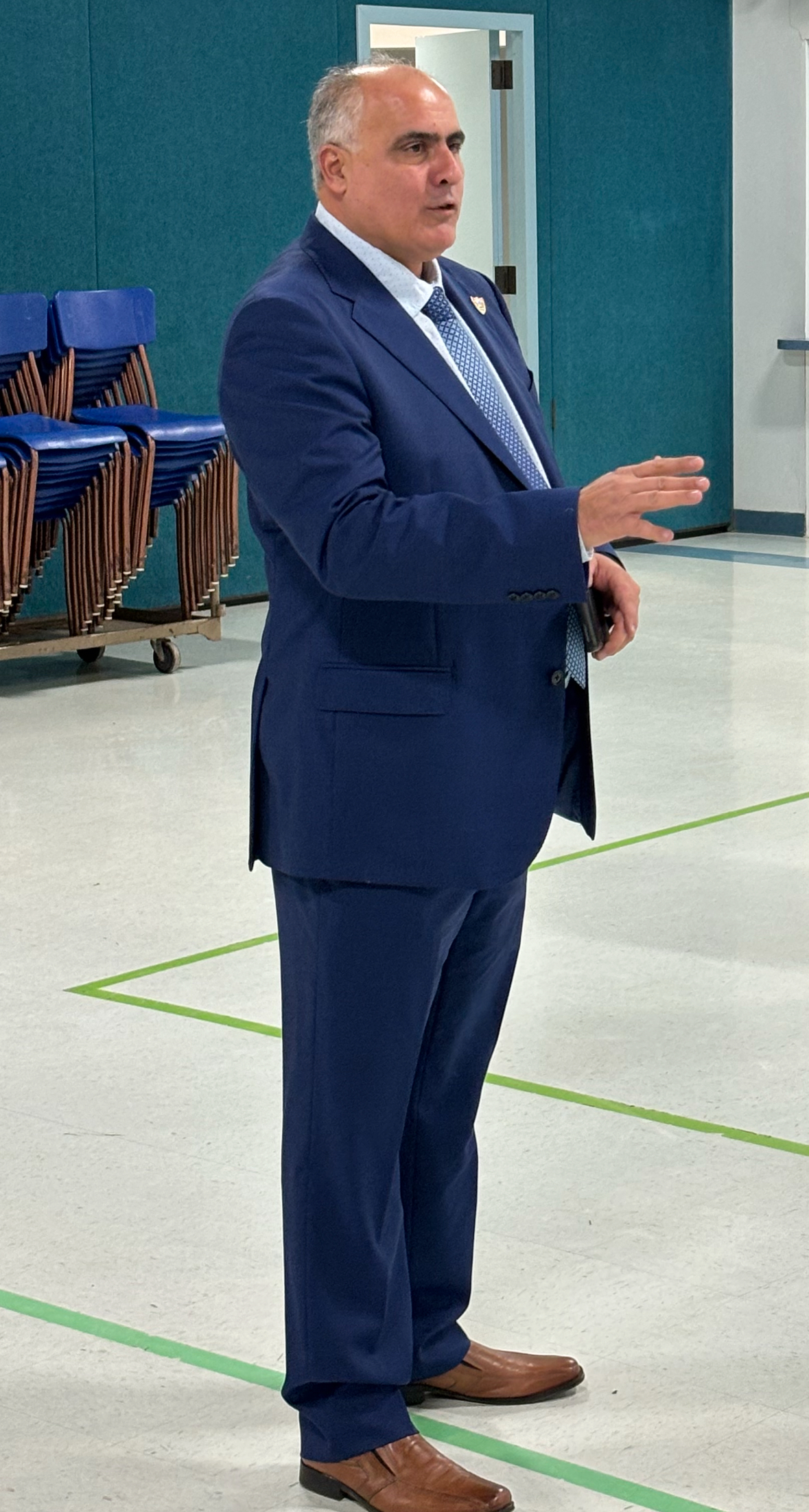
- Darouze in 2025

Member of the Ontario Provincial Parliament for Carleton
- Incumbent
- Assumed office February 27, 2025
- Preceded by: Goldie Ghamari

Ottawa City Councillor for Osgoode (Ward 20)
- In office December 1, 2014 – February 27, 2025
- Preceded by: Doug Thompson
- Succeeded by: Isabelle Skalski

Deputy Mayor of Ottawa
- In office December 2018 – December 1, 2022; Serving with Matthew Luloff (until 2020), Jenna Sudds (2020–2021) & Laura Dudas
- Preceded by: Bob Monette, Mark Taylor

Personal details
- Born: November 1964 (age 61)
- Party: Progressive Conservative
- Spouse: Sue Darouze

George Darouze MPP (born November 1964) is a Canadian politician who was elected to the Legislative Assembly of Ontario following the 2025 Ontario general election as the Member of Provincial Parliament for Carleton. Previously, he was the Ottawa City Councillor for Osgoode Ward from 2014 to 2025. He was elected for the first time in the 2014 Ottawa municipal election.

Darouze immigrated from Lebanon in 1990, settling in the community of Greely, Ontario in Osgoode Township, which would be amalgamated into Ottawa in 2001.

Darouze graduated from the Lebanese Academy of Fine Arts with a degree in Telecommunications. After moving to Canada, he worked in a number of odd-jobs such as busboy, baker, dishwasher and fast food employee before purchasing a pizzeria. Later, he became a sales representative for a Bell Mobility dealer, which led him to work in a number of managerial positions for various telecommunications companies. He speaks English, French and Arabic. He is the former president of the Ottawa-Carleton Snowmobile Trail Club.

Darouze has supported Conservative Member of Parliament Pierre Poilievre, as well as the previous councillor for Osgoode Ward, Doug Thompson.

Darouze, along with Laura Dudas and Matthew Luloff was appointed as a deputy mayor of the city in December 2018.

In 2020, Darouze was caught texting while driving while livestreaming as part of a virtual meeting of the city's audit committee. Darouze indicated he had done so "inadvertently." He has since apologized.

In 2022, Darouze won re-election as the representative for Osgoode Ward 20. He won the election by a margin of approximately 200 votes, securing a third term on Ottawa's city council.

On November 9, 2024, Darouze announced he was running for the Ontario Progressive Conservative Party nomination for the riding of Carleton ahead of the Next Ontario general election. On December 8, 2024, the Ontario Progressive Conservative Party announced Darouze as their candidate for the riding of Carleton. Darouze won the nomination contest with 96% of the vote, defeating Ottawa-Carleton District School Board trustee and former 2021 Conservative candidate for Ottawa West—Nepean Jennifer Jennekens.

== MPP initiatives ==
When the Ontario Federation of Snowmobile Clubs proposed cutting nearly 5,000 kilometres of trails from its network, Darouze and the provincial government committed an additional $3.9 million in funding to ensure that the entire trail network would remain intact for the 2025–26 season, citing the benefits that the industry has on rural tourism and economies.

== 2022-2026 Term of council ==
Darouze has spoken out against the Vacant Unit Tax in Ottawa on multiple occasions, including trying to repeal the Vacant Unit Tax in August 2023, and proposing changes that exempted certain rural properties, as well as providing opportunities for additional case-specific exemptions.

Darouze has pushed for further enhancements to the rural economy in Ottawa, moving a motion to include the rural and agricultural sector within the strategic priorities of the city's Economic Development Strategy and Action Plan.

Darouze spoke out against a lowering of the curbside waste collection limit in 2023, acknowledging concerns from rural residents with respect to the potential for an increase in illegal dumping.

Darouze spoke out and voted against deferral of works related to the widening of the Airport Parkway, citing the fact that this highway is one of the first impressions that visitors to the City of Ottawa will have upon arrival at the Ottawa Airport in the city's south end.

Darouze provided a direction to City staff in October 2024 to conduct a fulsome review of rural villages in 2025 and provide recommendations for growth opportunities in smaller and mid-size villages, in order to prevent stagnation of housing development and services.

== Committees ==
Prior to his resignation as a city councillor, Darouze sat on the following Committees and Boards of Directors:

- Transportation Committee
- Agriculture and Rural Affairs Committee (chair)
- Finance and Corporate Services Committee
- Planning and Housing Committee (ex-officio)
- South Nation Conservation Authority

== Volunteering and awards ==
Darouze has volunteered with the Greely Winter Carnival, the Osgoode Village and Metcalfe Santa Claus Parades, the Vernon Arts and Crafts Show, and the Ottawa Regional Cancer Foundation.

In 2011, Darouze was awarded Volunteer of the Year by the Ontario Federation of Snowmobile Clubs. George's extensive volunteer work was also recognized in 2011 when he received the Osgoode Ward Community Volunteer Award, and in 2012 when he became a Queen's Diamond Jubilee medal recipient.

== Integrity commissioner investigation and lawsuit ==
According to CBC News, Darouze "tried to silence a woman who criticized him on social media during last fall's [2018] municipal election by writing to her husband's boss, the chief of police, according to a scathing report from the city's integrity commissioner."

The complaint was received on March 12, 2019.

The commissioner stated that "on a balance of probabilities, I find that the major motivation of the councillor was to bully and intimidate the complainants and each of them in the hope that female complainant might cease her critical Facebook commentary of him." The commissioner further wrote that it was written "for the primary reason of silencing the female complainant and causing the male complainant grief in his workplace."

Darouze was criticized online over the matter.

The matter is settled (as of August 2022), the complainant and her husband had filed a lawsuit against Darouze for alleged damages, but eventually dropped the lawsuit. Following the commissioner's report, Darouze had emailed the couple that he was "truly sorry" that they "perceived" his actions as harassment.

== Political positions as councillor ==
- On August 31, 2016, Darouze argued against banning hookah waterpipe smoking indoors, saying: "I'm tired of being the nanny state and the government telling us how to do our business. I find in our city, we go from one extreme to another."
- On May 18, 2017, A motion to delay construction on Saturday morning by two hours failed at Thursday's community and protective services committee. Darouze was among four councillors opposing the motion, part of a larger noise by-law review.
- On March 20, 2018, CBC News published an analysis of the preceding three years of hospitality spending by councillors. The analysis found a four-way tie among councillors who expensed business lunches. Darouze was among the four who expensed 60 lunches during the council term. After Tim Tierney and Rick Chiarelli, Darouze was third in overall spending.
- Following a Byward market shooting in January 2019 by a man known to police, Darouze indicated he would not support a handgun ban, stating: "You can ban guns all you want. They just go to the States and buy them at corner store and smuggle them here. We need to have tougher laws so if the criminal puts his hand on a gun and he gets caught, he goes to jail for a long, long time."
- In December 2019, Darouze was among three of four councillors voting in the rural and agricultural affairs committee to approve a warehouse in North Gower. The meeting had been attended by about 30 local residents opposed to the warehouse.
- On May 27, 2020, council voted on a motion from Mathieu Fleury to expand a program that provides people addicted to opioids with a safe supply of drugs. Fleury indicated the measure could increases in petty crime since the arrival of the pandemic. George Darouze was among three councillors voting against.
- On September 22, 2021, council voted on a motion from Jeff Leiper to allow his Confederation Line (LRT) motion to be discussed, which would see city council hold bi-weekly meetings to address recent issues such as derailments. The motion was defeated. Darouze was among seven council members who dismissed the motion.

== Electoral history ==
=== Provincial ===
2025 Ontario general election: Carleton
Party	Candidate	Votes	%	±%
Progressive Conservative	George Darouze	26,158	49.61	+1.47
Liberal	Brandon Bay	20,335	38.57	+11.68
New Democratic	Sherin Faili	3,763	7.14	–8.53
Green	Mystic Plaunt	956	1.81	–3.67
New Blue	Rob Stocki	699	1.33	–0.91
Ontario Party	Myles Dear	346	0.66	–0.41
Libertarian	Bruce Anthony Faulkner	263	0.50	–
Independent	Brian Hull	202	0.38	–
Total valid votes		52,722	99.53	
Total rejected, unmarked and declined ballots		251	0.47	+0.14
Turnout		52,973	47.10	–1.69
Eligible voters		112,480		
Progressive Conservative hold		Swing		▼5.11
Source: Elections Ontario

PC Carleton nomination contest: December 8, 2024

Candidate
Candidate	%
George Darouze	96
Jennifer Jennekens	4
Total	100

=== Municipal ===
After eight months of campaigning and knocking on over 9,000 doors, Darouze was elected as a first time councillor in the 2014 municipal election for Osgoode Ward. He won with 1,783 votes and 21.06% in a crowded race.

Darouze was re-elected in the 2018 municipal election as the councillor for Osgoode Ward. According to Horizon Ottawa, Darouze received $20,100 in campaign contributions from individuals connected to the real estate development industry, totaling 78% of contributions. Almost half of elected councillors also received the majority of their campaign contributions from such individuals.

2014 Ottawa municipal election: Osgoode Ward
Candidate	Vote	%
George Darouze	1,783	21.06
George Wright	1,309	15.46
Jean Johnston-McKitterick	1,158	13.68
Liam Maguire	1,146	13.54
Tom Dawson	1,097	12.96
Davis Jermacans	1,064	12.57
Mark Scharfe	327	3.86
Kim Sheldrick	293	3.46
Bob Masaro	215	2.54
Paul St. Jean	45	0.53
Allen Scantland	28	0.33

2018 Ottawa municipal election: Osgoode Ward
Candidate	Vote	%
George Darouze (X)	4,653	54.86
Jay Tysick	2,694	31.76
Mark Scharfe	603	7.11
Kim Sheldrick	504	5.94
Auguste Banfalvi	28	0.33

2022 Ottawa municipal election: Osgoode Ward
Candidate	Vote	%
George Darouze	4,353	40.81
Doug Thompson	4,115	38.58
Dan O'Brien	1,541	14.45
Bob Masaro	432	4.05
Bruce Anthony Faulkner	226	2.12
