= Osgoode Township =

Historic township in Ottawa, Ontario, Canada

Coordinates: 45°13′N 75°31′W

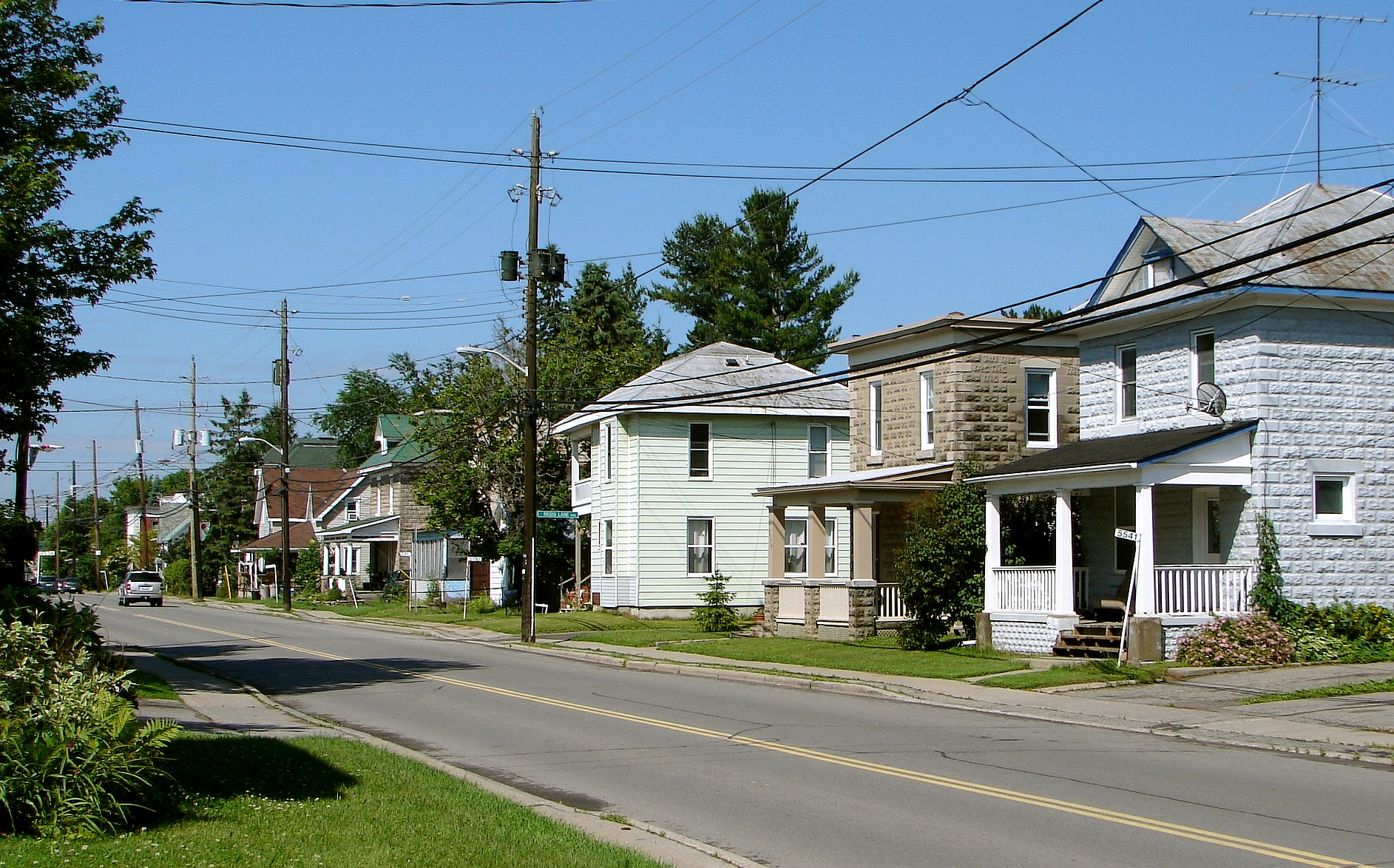
Osgoode

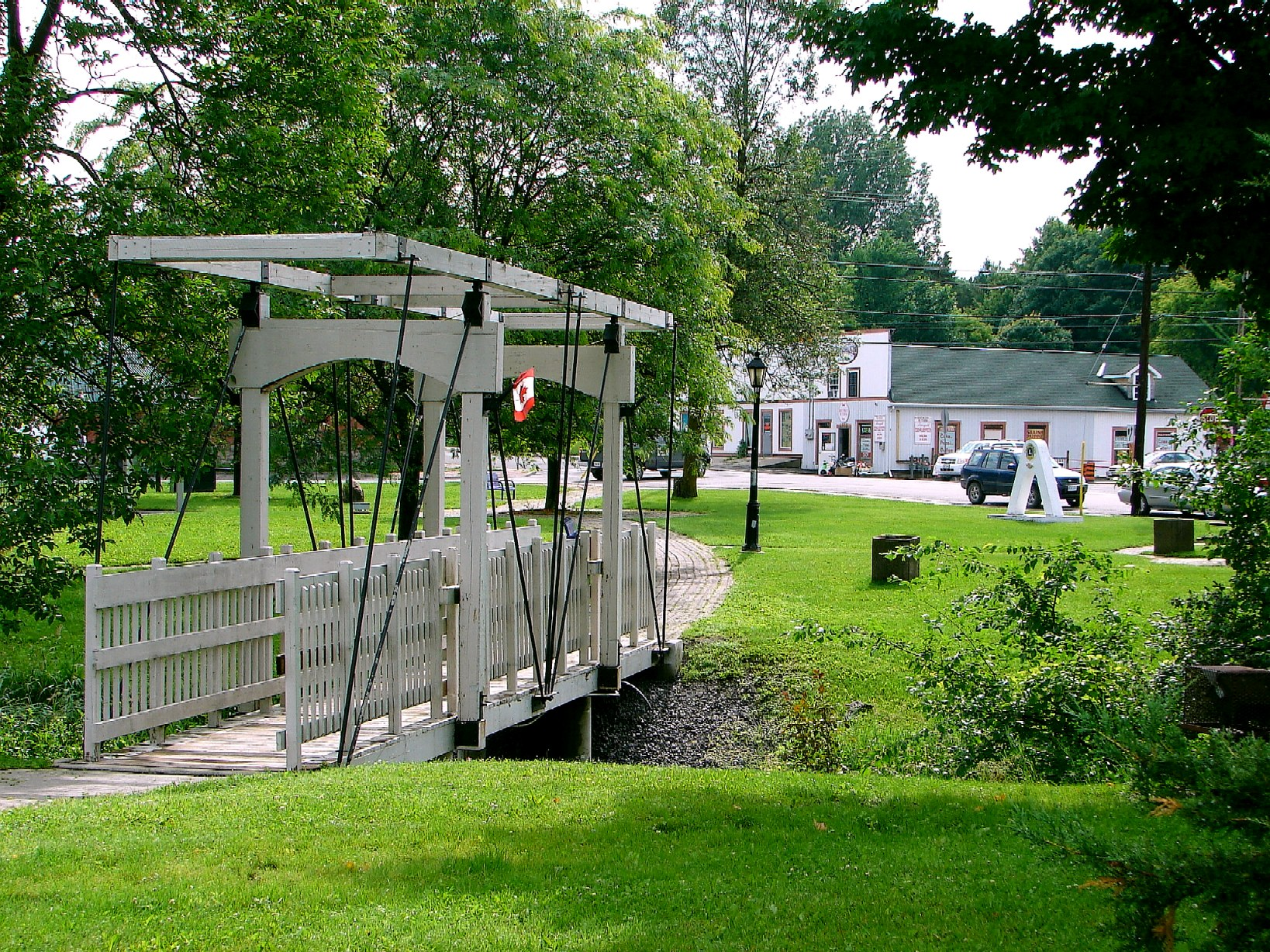
Metcalfe

Osgoode Township is a former township that is now a part of the city of Ottawa, Ontario, Canada. The township along the Rideau River was established in 1798 and incorporated in 1850. It was an independent township in Carleton County until its amalgamation with the city in 2001. It remains a largely rural area with only some 23,285 inhabitants as of the 2016 census. As of the Canada 2021 Census, this had increased to 24,199.

Several branches of the Castor River, a tributary of the South Nation River, flow through the township.

The township took its name from William Osgoode, the first Chief Justice of Upper Canada.

== History ==
Originally the territory of the Mississaugas, the land for the township was acquired by the British in the 1780s. It was not until 1827 that the first European settlers, the McDonnell and York families, arrived. The Hall and Loney families settled in the township the following year. The early settlers were attracted to the area by the good farm land and the large stands of white pine and white oak. The first two township roads intersected in Baker's Corners (now Metcalfe). Further settlement in the township followed the construction of the Rideau Canal and the railway through Osgoode.

Osgoode Township was incorporated in 1850. It was merged into the City of Ottawa on January 1, 2001.

== Reeves ==
- 1850 - Arthur Allen
- 1855 - John Dow
- 1857 - John C. Bower
- 1858 - John Dow
- 1871 - Alexander McEwen
- 1873 - Ira Morgan
- 1876 - Adam J. Baker
- 1879 - Ira Morgan
- 1883 - W.F. Campbell
- 1884 - Ira Morgan
- 1892 - James Whiteside
- 1893 - Allan P. McDonell
- 1900 - James Simpson
- 1904 - Thomas James
- 1907 - Alex Dow
- 1918 - Duncan McDiarmid
- 1922 - S.J. Loney
- 1926 - J.H. Nixon
- 1934 - George S. Lewis
- 1948 - Dr. W. A. Taylor
- 1950 - John E. Boland
- 1958 - Dr. W. A. Taylor
- 1976 - Al Bouwers

== Mayors ==
- 1982–1995 - Al Bouwers
- 1995–1998 - Lloyd Cranston
- 1998–2001 - Doug Thompson

== Demographics ==
According to the Canada 2011 Census:

- Population: 22,239
- % Change (2006–2011): +9.4%
- Dwellings:
- Area (km^{2}): 379.86
- Density (persons per km^{2}): 58.5

== See also ==
- Castor Valley Elementary School
- Greely Elementary School
- Greely, Ontario
- Kenmore, Ontario
- Metcalfe, Ontario
- Osgoode Township High School
- Osgoode, Ontario
- Vernon, Ontario
- List of townships in Ontario
