= Osgoode, Ontario =

Osgoode
- Community
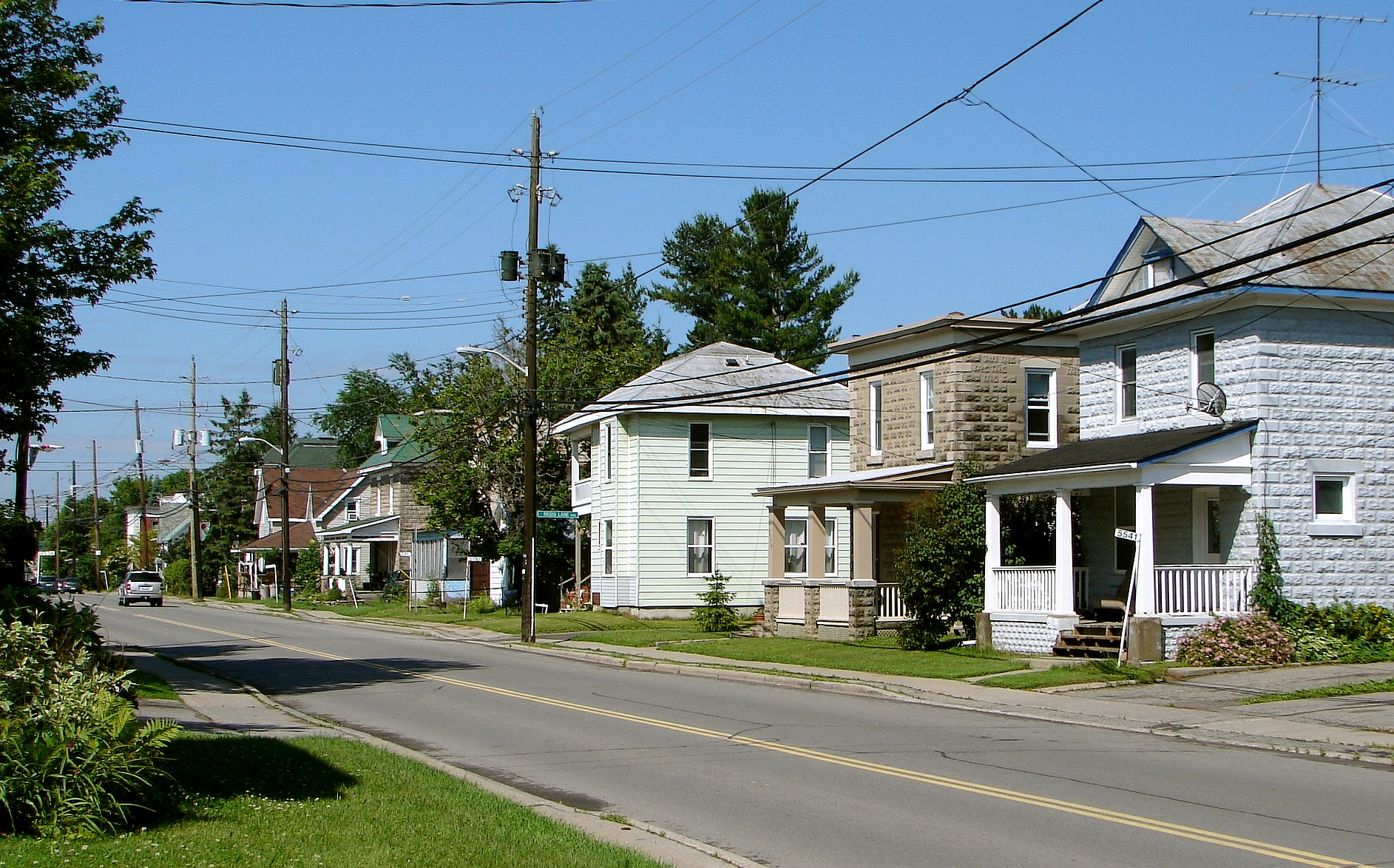
- Osgoode Main Street

- Location in Ottawa
- Coordinates: 45°08′40″N 75°36′15″W
- Country: Canada
- Province: Ontario
- City: Ottawa
- Established: 1827
- Incorporated: 1910 (Police Village of Osgoode Station)
- Amalgamation: 1974 (Township of Osgoode); 2001 (City of Ottawa)

Government
  - MPs: Bruce Fanjoy
  - MPPs: George Darouze
  - Councillors: Isabelle Skalski

Area
  - Land: 2.975 km^{2} (1.149 sq mi)
- Elevation: 90 m (300 ft)

Population (2016)
  - Total: 2,578
  - Density: 866.671/km^{2} (2,244.67/sq mi)
- Time zone: UTC−5 (Eastern (EST))
  - Summer (DST): UTC−4 (EDT)
- Area codes: 613, 343, 753

Osgoode (also called Osgoode Village) is a population centre in Osgoode Ward in the rural south end of Ottawa, Ontario, Canada. It lies surrounded by farmland and is about 2 km east of the Rideau River. Until amalgamation in 2001, it was part of Osgoode Township. At the Canada 2016 Census, the population was 2,578.

== History ==
Osgoode, called Osgoode Station until 1962, was originally part of Osgoode Township; it became part of Ottawa in 2001. The community was named for William Osgoode, the first Chief Justice of Upper Canada.

== Present day ==
Landmarks of the community include the Stuart Holmes Arena for ice hockey; the Osgoode Community Centre; and its surrounding recreation facilities, the mall, and numerous shops.

The nearest airport is the Kars/Rideau Valley Air Park, about 5 kilometres (3 mi) away, on the other side of the Rideau River.

== In popular culture ==
In the 2020 American disaster film Greenland, starring Gerard Butler, several private planes leave from Osgoode to take refugees to Thule Air Base in Greenland.
