= Greely, Ontario =

Rural community in Ottawa, Ontario, Canada

Coordinates: 45°15′41″N 75°33′40″W

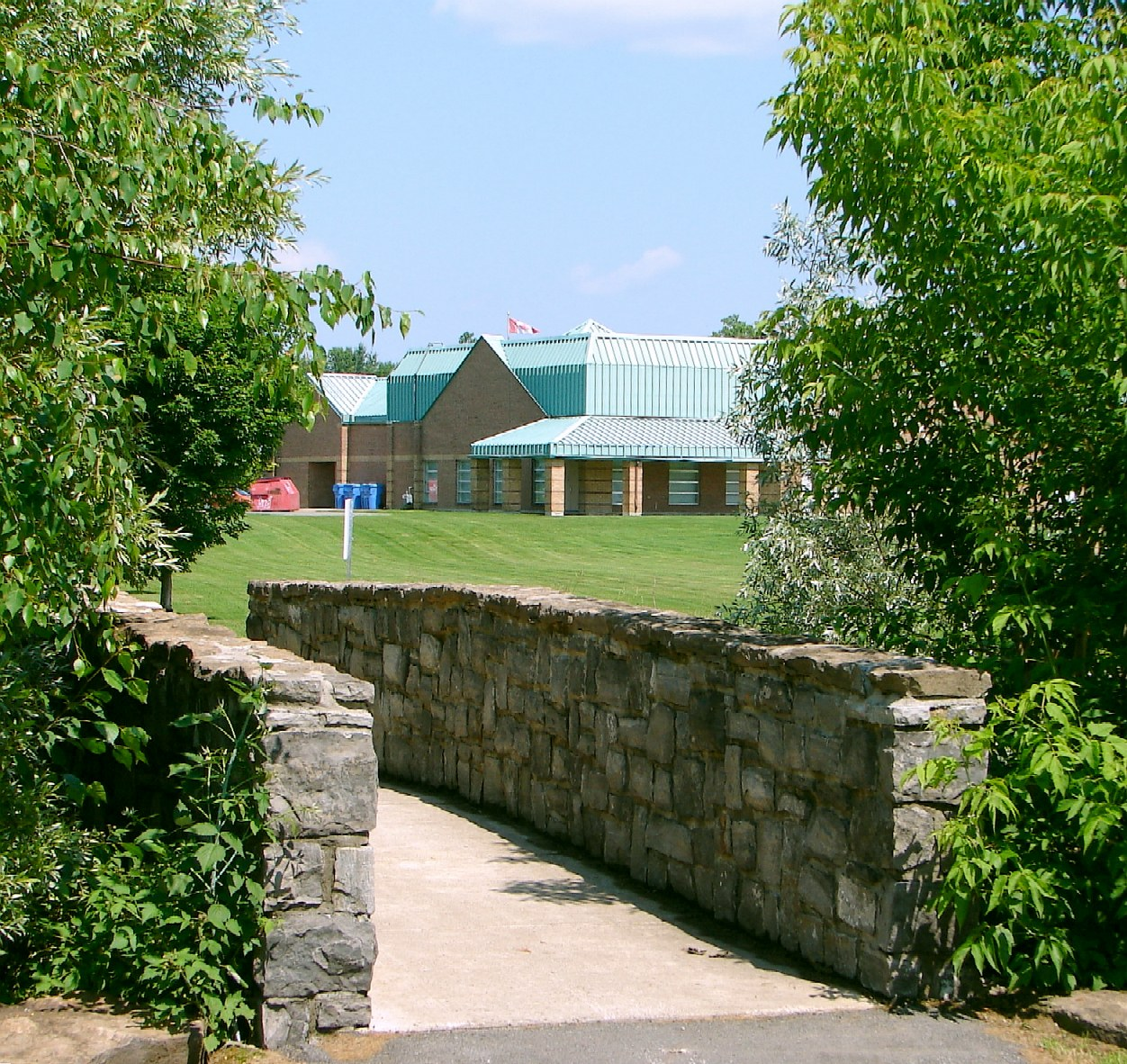
Greely community centre

Greely is a suburban-rural community in Ottawa, Ontario, Canada. Located south of the city in Osgoode Ward, it was part of the Township of Osgoode prior to amalgamation in 2001. Greely is currently the largest rural village in terms of land area and the third largest in terms of population in the City of Ottawa. According to the Greely Community Association, it is bounded on the east by Sale Barn Road and Greyscreek Road, on the north by Mitch Owens on the west by Manotick Station Road, and on the south by Snake Island Road. According to the Canada 2011 Census, the population within these boundaries was 9,049.

Greely falls within the borders of the federal parliamentary riding of Carleton. Provincially, it falls within the riding of Carleton, which shares the same boundaries of its federal counterpart, and is represented on City Council by George Darouze, being in Osgoode Ward.

Greely is home to a set of tight-knit and unique communities throughout the village. Most homes sit on 1/2-acre to 2-acre (8,100 m^{2}) lots. Some developers offer condominium-like amenities such as pools, tennis courts, man-made lakes, beaches, and small neighbourhood community centres within their residential communities. The Greely Community Centre hosts meetings and activities for the entire rural town. Every year, they organize a Winter Carnival and a renowned Canada Day celebration.

Between 2000 and 2008, Greely has seen a 58.7% increase in the number of dwellings. Greely's increasingly rapid growth can be attributed to its rural atmosphere and easy access to Ottawa's urban centre. Furthermore, Greely presently has several large areas of undeveloped land within its boundaries. Greely's boundaries currently contain enough land for approximately twenty-two years of residential growth based on current development patterns.

Greely has a strong commercial district housing many small and medium manufacturing and services companies. It has a few businesses to provide the community with essentials, including 2 gas stations, 3 pizzerias, an A & W and a couple of restaurants. In the summer, it hosts an outdoor weekly market featuring local makers, a coffee shop and a used book store. A new commercial development at Parkway Road and Bank Street houses a 24-hour grocery store with liquor/beer store, a dollar store and more businesses under development.

== Churches ==
- All Saints Anglican Church
- Parkway Road Pentecostal Church
- Our Lady of the Visitation (Not actually in Greely, but on the border. Many Greely residents attend this church, and they hold events in Greely.)

== Schools ==
- Castor Valley Elementary School
- Greely Elementary School
- St. Mary Elementary School (Not actually in Greely, but on the border. Many Greely children attend this school.)

== Library ==
The Greely branch of the Ottawa Public Library was opened in 1976, after receiving approval from Osgoode Township Council, with the local fire department agreeing to let them use their meeting room for the branch. During the 1990s, the Osgoode Township Library Board received a grant from the Ontario government to build a new branch, but the building never came to fruition. In 2009, the community secured funding for a brand new 3,500-square-foot (330 m^{2}) library to be built as an extension to the Greely Community Centre at 1448 Meadow Drive. The new facility opened its doors on March 14, 2011.

== Notable residents ==
- Pierre Poilievre (born 1979), Current Member of Parliament for Battle-River Crowfoot, leader of the Conservative Party of Canada and leader of the Official Opposition.
