= Chapleau, Ontario =

Chapleau
- Township (single-tier)
- Township of Chapleau
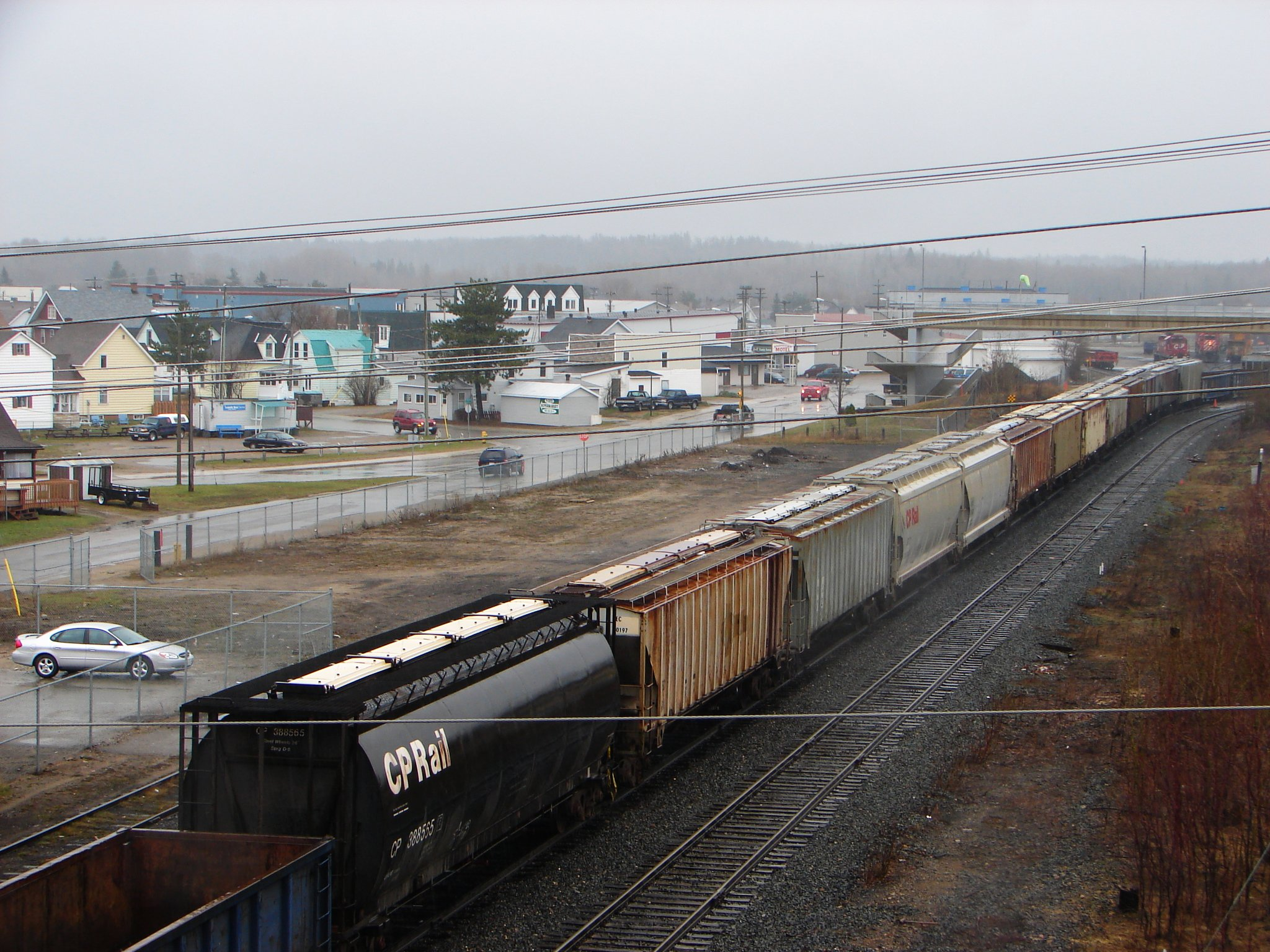
- Motto: Prosperity, Industry
- Location within Ontario
- Coordinates: 47°50′38″N 83°24′01″W
- Country: Canada
- Province: Ontario
- District: Sudbury
- Established: 1885
- Incorporated: 1901

Government
  - Type: Township
  - Mayor: Ryan Bignucolo
  - MP: Gaétan Malette (Conservative)
  - MPP: Bill Rosenberg (PC)

Area
  - Land: 13.20 km^{2} (5.10 sq mi)
  - Urban: 0.59 km^{2} (0.23 sq mi)
- Elevation (at weather station): 448.1 m (1,470 ft)

Population (2021)
  - Total: 1,942
  - Density: 147.1/km^{2} (381/sq mi)
  - Urban: 1,144
  - Urban density: 1,929.5/km^{2} (4,997/sq mi)
- Time zone: UTC−05:00 (EST)
  - Summer (DST): UTC−04:00 (EDT)
- Postal code span: P0M 1K0
- Area codes: 705, 249
- Website: www.chapleau.ca

Chapleau is a township in Sudbury District, Ontario, Canada. It is the access point to one of the world's largest wildlife preserves. Chapleau has a population of 1,942 according to the 2021 Canadian census.

The major industries within the town are the logging mill, Rayonier Advanced Materials (RYAM) (formerly Tembec), and the Canadian Pacific Railway (CPR) rail yards.

== History ==
In 1885 the Canadian Pacific Railway was built through the area. The CPR chose this as a divisional point, and the town was founded. It was named in honour of Sir Joseph-Adolphe Chapleau, a lawyer, journalist, businessman, politician, and most notably the 5th Premier of Quebec. Around 1887, the Hudson's Bay Company established a fur trade post and store in Chapleau near the Canadian Pacific Railway line. It was the headquarters of HBC's Michipicoten District from that year until 1892 when the post closed.

Chapleau was incorporated as the Corporation of the Township of Chapleau on February 1, 1901.

Louis Hémon, author of the French novel Maria Chapdelaine, was struck and killed by a train in Chapleau on 8 July 1913.

After a fire in 1948, the government was prompted to construct a road to Chapleau to enable logging contractors to truck timber before it rotted. The Chapleau Road (now Highway 129) was completed on January 28, 1949. In the early 1960s, Highway 101 was completed to link Chapleau with Timmins to the east, and Wawa to the west.

Chapleau also developed logging and lumber mill operations. Up until 1994 the town supported no less than three lumber mills, but the United States' imposition of a softwood lumber tariff designed to benefit American lumber companies has led to many layoffs and difficult times for the town. At its largest, with large CPR and lumber operations, the town had a population of over 5,000. However, the town has been gradually shrinking since 1950.

In 1967, the Chapleau Centennial Museum was opened to showcase and celebrate local history. It is located at 94 Monk Street.

== Geography ==
Chapleau is located in central Northeastern Ontario, in the heart of the Canadian Shield. Chapleau is geographically isolated; the nearest cities are Sault Ste. Marie, Timmins, and Sudbury, but all are more than a two-hour drive away. Highway 129 links the town with Highway 101, running east to Timmins and west to Wawa. Highway 129 also runs south, connecting with the Trans-Canada Highway, Highway 17 at Thessalon, 227 km (141 mi) from Chapleau.

Via Rail's Sudbury–White River train also connects Chapleau station with White River, Sudbury and a number of remote communities.

Three First Nations reserves are located near the township: Chapleau Cree First Nation, Brunswick House First Nation, and Chapleau Ojibway First Nation.

One unusual feature of the community's transportation network is that because a railway yard separates the community into distinct halves, the main street in the western portion of the community loops back over itself in a manner resembling a cloverleaf interchange, and then crosses over both itself and the railway yard on a grade separation before returning to street level to link to the eastern street grid.

=== Chapleau Crown Game Preserve ===
Chapleau Crown Game Preserve to the north of the town is, at over 7,000 km^{2} (2,700 sq mi), the largest animal preserve in the world. Protected wildlife include moose, black bears, pygmy shrews, bald eagles and loons. The preserve is a source of tourism, drawing nature-enthusiasts and fishermen to the township. All forms of hunting and trapping have been forbidden in the preserve since the 1920s. The result is an area with abundant wildlife. In fact, over 2,500 moose and over 2,000 black bears reside within the game preserve. Logging does occur within the preserve, as does fishing. There are two provincial parks and cottages located within the preserve.

=== Climate ===
Chapleau experiences a humid continental climate (Dfb) with warm, rainy summers and long, cold, and snowy winters.

Climate data for Chapleau (Chapleau Airport) Climate ID: 6061361; coordinates 47°49′12″N 83°20′48″W; elevation: 448.1 m (1,470 ft); 1991−2020 normals, extremes 1916−present
Month	Jan	Feb	Mar	Apr	May	Jun	Jul	Aug	Sep	Oct	Nov	Dec	Year
Record high humidex	7.0	9.6	28.7	28.5	39.1	40.8	41.8	41.0	37.2	29.2	23.0	10.7	41.8
Record high °C (°F)	7.2 (45.0)	14.4 (57.9)	26.2 (79.2)	30.0 (86.0)	33.9 (93.0)	39.4 (102.9)	39.4 (102.9)	35.6 (96.1)	35.6 (96.1)	27.2 (81.0)	19.4 (66.9)	15.0 (59.0)	39.4 (102.9)
Mean daily maximum °C (°F)	−9.2 (15.4)	−6.8 (19.8)	−0.2 (31.6)	7.2 (45.0)	16.3 (61.3)	21.9 (71.4)	23.6 (74.5)	22.2 (72.0)	17.2 (63.0)	8.9 (48.0)	0.8 (33.4)	−5.8 (21.6)	8.0 (46.4)
Daily mean °C (°F)	−15.5 (4.1)	−13.6 (7.5)	−7.0 (19.4)	1.1 (34.0)	9.6 (49.3)	15.3 (59.5)	17.4 (63.3)	16.2 (61.2)	11.5 (52.7)	4.6 (40.3)	−3.3 (26.1)	−10.6 (12.9)	2.1 (35.8)
Mean daily minimum °C (°F)	−21.6 (−6.9)	−20.4 (−4.7)	−13.9 (7.0)	−5.1 (22.8)	2.7 (36.9)	8.7 (47.7)	11.2 (52.2)	10.1 (50.2)	5.9 (42.6)	0.1 (32.2)	−7.3 (18.9)	−15.5 (4.1)	−3.8 (25.2)
Record low °C (°F)	−50.0 (−58.0)	−46.7 (−52.1)	−43.9 (−47.0)	−33.3 (−27.9)	−13.3 (8.1)	−7.2 (19.0)	−3.0 (26.6)	−7.8 (18.0)	−10.0 (14.0)	−18.9 (−2.0)	−37.2 (−35.0)	−47.2 (−53.0)	−50.0 (−58.0)
Record low wind chill	−56.4	−50.7	−45.5	−30.2	−14.1	−4.4	0.0	0.0	−6.7	−21.3	−34.1	−46.0	−56.4
Average precipitation mm (inches)	51.0 (2.01)	41.9 (1.65)	47.6 (1.87)	65.6 (2.58)	71.9 (2.83)	83.5 (3.29)	85.7 (3.37)	77.6 (3.06)	101.1 (3.98)	88.8 (3.50)	71.9 (2.83)	54.8 (2.16)	841.4 (33.13)
Average rainfall mm (inches)	3.0 (0.12)	2.1 (0.08)	13.6 (0.54)	36.4 (1.43)	65.6 (2.58)	83.5 (3.29)	85.7 (3.37)	77.6 (3.06)	100.5 (3.96)	76.2 (3.00)	27.9 (1.10)	7.0 (0.28)	579.1 (22.80)
Average snowfall cm (inches)	56.1 (22.1)	45.4 (17.9)	37.2 (14.6)	27.5 (10.8)	5.4 (2.1)	0.0 (0.0)	0.0 (0.0)	0.0 (0.0)	0.6 (0.2)	11.4 (4.5)	46.2 (18.2)	54.4 (21.4)	284.2 (111.9)
Average precipitation days (≥ 0.2 mm)	19.2	15.5	13.8	12.5	13.6	14.4	15.5	14.8	16.5	18.7	19.0	19.7	193.1
Average rainy days (≥ 0.2 mm)	1.5	1.1	3.5	7.3	12.7	14.4	15.5	14.8	16.4	15.6	7.3	2.9	112.8
Average snowy days (≥ 0.2 cm)	19.0	15.3	11.8	7.1	1.6	0.0	0.0	0.0	0.38	6.0	15.1	18.5	94.8
Average relative humidity (%) (at 15:00 LST)	74.3	66.6	55.2	50.7	47.2	52.0	56.3	59.4	63.8	68.9	76.8	79.5	62.6
Source: Environment and Climate Change Canada

== Demographics ==
In the 2021 Canadian census conducted by Statistics Canada, Chapleau had a population of 1,942 living in 867 of its 973 total private dwellings, a change of −1.1 per cent from its 2016 population of 1,964. With a land area of 13.2 km^{2} (5.1 sq mi), it had a population density of 147.1/km^{2} in 2021.

Canada census – Chapleau community profile

	2021	2016	2011
Population	1,942 (-1.1% from 2016)	1,964 (-7.2% from 2011)	2,116 (-10.1% from 2006)
Land area	13.20 km^{2} (5.10 sq mi)	14.22 km^{2} (5.49 sq mi)	14.27 km^{2} (5.51 sq mi)
Population density	147.1/km^{2} (381/sq mi)	138.2/km^{2} (358/sq mi)	148.3/km^{2} (384/sq mi)
Median age	47.6 (M: 47.6, F: 47.6)	47.2 (M: 47.8, F: 46.6)
Private dwellings	973 (total) 867 (occupied)	1,022 (total)	1,046 (total)
Median household income	$84,000	$72,128

References: 2021 2016 2011

Historical census populations – Chapleau, Ontario

Year	Pop.	±%
1921	2,236	—
1931	2,238	+0.1%
1941	1,867	−16.6%
1951	2,619	+40.3%
1956	3,407	+30.1%
1961	3,785	+11.1%

Year	Pop.	±%
1966	3,778	−0.2%
1971	3,389	−10.3%
1976	3,294	−2.8%
1981	3,243	−1.5%
1986	3,184	−1.8%
1991	3,077	−3.4%

Year	Pop.	±%
1996	2,934	−4.6%
2001	2,832	−3.5%
2006	2,354	−16.9%
2011	2,116	−10.1%
2016	1,964	−7.2%
2021	1,942	−1.1%

== Economy ==
Main employers in Chapleau include the Canadian Pacific Railway and Ryam Lumber. Tourism is also an important part of the economy with several outfitters and lodges operating in the area.

In 2012, the Chapleau Economic Development Corporation (CEDC) was founded as an independent, non-profit organization. Resolution 28-371, passed by the Chapleau Town Council on September 24, 2012, established the existing agreement between the Township and the CEDC.

Goldcorp is working towards the advanced exploration phase at the Borden Gold project.

Borden Lake Mine opened September 23, 2019, creating many jobs for the local populace.

== Government ==
The town is governed locally by a five-member council. The current council is made up of Mayor Ryan Bignucolo and Councillors Lisi Bernier, Paul Bernier, Cathy Ansara and Alex Lambruschini.

== Wireless mesh Internet ==
Starting on November 9, 2005, Chapleau residents began testing a wireless mesh Internet technology in a program called Project Chapleau. This Wi-Fi connection covered the entire town and was the first of its kind in Canada.

This service was designed and implemented by Bell Canada Enterprises, Nortel Networks, and the Township of Chapleau.

An analysis of the impact of high-speed internet on the residents and town of Chapleau was published in 2010 by Jessica Collins and Barry Wellman.

In April, 2007, Project Chapleau concluded without a reason being given. The Project Chapleau office (The Chapleau Innovation Centre) was converted into a public internet access point, with job search and community networking facilities.

== Education ==
The town has two high schools, Chapleau Elementary and Secondary School (CESS) and École Secondaire Catholique Trillium, and two elementary schools, École élémentaire catholique Sacré-Cœur, and Our Lady of Fatima. Chapleau Elementary and Secondary school belongs to the Algoma District School Board, the others belong to the French and English Catholic school boards.

== Media ==
All of the township's regular broadcast media are rebroadcasters of signals from Sudbury, Timmins or Wawa. The township's only purely local media service is CFJW-FM 93.7, a special station which airs information from the municipal government in the event of a weather or industrial emergency. The station does not broadcast on a regular basis; in the event of an emergency, the municipal fire service activates its fire sirens to alert residents to tune in the station.

=== Radio ===
Frequency	Call sign	Branding	Format	Owner	Notes
FM 89.9	CBCU-FM	CBC Radio One	public news/talk	Canadian Broadcasting Corporation	rebroadcasts CBCS-FM Sudbury
FM 91.9	CBON-FM-28	Ici Radio-Canada Première	public news/talk	Canadian Broadcasting Corporation	French, rebroadcasts CBON-FM Sudbury
FM 93.7	CFJW-FM			Emergency alert	
FM 95.9	CHAP-FM	Community radio			Community-owned rebroadcaster of CHYC-FM Sudbury
FM 100.7	CJWA-FM-1		adult contemporary		Rebroadcaster of CJWA-FM (Wawa)

=== Television ===
OTA channel	Call sign	Network	Notes
9 (VHF)	CITO-TV-4	CTV	Rebroadcaster of CITO-TV (Timmins); de facto rebroadcaster of CICI-TV (Sudbury)

== Notable people ==
- Floyd Curry (1925–2006), NHL player and four-time Stanley Cup winner
- Robert Deluce, airline executive and current president and CEO of Porter Airlines
- Robert Fife, journalist and author
- Liz Howard, poet and winner of the Griffin Poetry Prize
- Adélard Lafrance (1912–1995), professional ice hockey player
- Rick Norlock, federal Member of Parliament
- Graham Ragsdale, decorated Canadian Army sniper
- Jason Ward, 1997 first-round draft pick of the Montreal Canadiens

== See also ==
- List of townships in Ontario
- List of francophone communities in Ontario
