= 13th Parliament of Upper Canada =

Parliament for Upper Canada 1836–1840

←	12th	1st (Prov. of Canada)	→
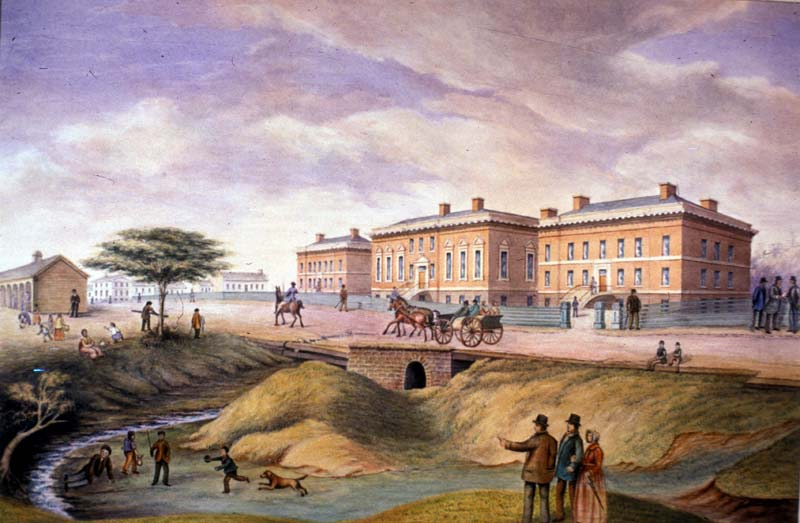
- Third Parliament Buildings of Upper Canada

Overview
- Legislative body: Parliament of Upper Canada
- Jurisdiction: Upper Canada, British North America
- Meeting place: Third Parliament Buildings of Upper Canada
- Term: Nov. 8, 1836 – Feb 10, 1840
- Election: June 1836

Crown of the United Kingdom
- Monarch: William IV (to 1837); Victoria (from 1837)
- Lieutenant Governor: Sir Francis Bond Head (to 1838); Sir George Arthur (1838–39); Lord Sydenham (from 1839)

Legislative Council
- Speaker (Note: By custom, the Chief Justice of the Court of King's Bench): John Beverley Robinson

House of Assembly
- Members: 62
- Speaker: Archibald McLean (1st sess.); Allan MacNab (2nd–5th); Henry Ruttan (acting 3rd) (Note: 1837-12-28 to 1838-01-24 during MacNab's absence)

The 13th Parliament of Upper Canada was opened 8 November 1836. Elections in Upper Canada had been held 20 June 1836. All sessions were held at Toronto.

The House of Assembly had five sessions 8 November 1836 to 10 February 1840.

Both the House and Parliament sat at the third Parliament Buildings of Upper Canada.

Sessions	Start	End
1st	8 November 1836	4 March 1837
2nd	19 June 1837	11 July 1837
3rd	28 December 1837	6 March 1838
4th	27 February 1839	11 May 1839
5th	3 December 1839	10 February 1840

In the election campaign of June 1836, the Lieutenant Governor Sir Francis Bond Head appealed to the United Empire Loyalists of the colony, proclaiming that the reformers were advocating American republicanism. The Conservative party, led by the wealthy landowners known as the "Family Compact", won the election resulting in a conservative majority in the legislative assembly and triggering dissent in the province. Owing to their unpopularity, the Tories would pass a bill to extend the life of parliament despite the death of William IV in 1837, disregarding the established practice of dissolving the House upon the death of a monarch. This was the last parliament for Upper Canada. This parliament was dissolved 10 February 1840. The Act of Union 1840 abolished the legislative assemblies for Upper and Lower Canada and created a new Province of Canada with a common Legislative Assembly. This came as a result of the Rebellions of 1837.

== Seats allocation ==
All 61 seats represented in the 12th parliament were represented in the 13th parliament. The only new addition was London, which became the seventh town to be allocated a seat.

== Members ==
Riding	Member	First elected/ previously elected	No. of terms
Brockville	Henry Sherwood	1836	1st term
Carleton	John Bower Lewis	1830	3rd term
Carleton	Edward Malloch	1834	2nd term
Cornwall	George Stephen Benjamin Jarvis	1836	1st term
Dundas	Peter Shaver	1820, 1828	5th term*
Dundas	John Cook	1830	3rd term
Durham	George Strange Boulton	1824, 1830	4th term*
Durham	George Elliott	1836	1st term
Essex	John Prince	1836	1st term
Essex	Francis Xavier Caldwell	1834	2nd term
Frontenac	John B. Marks	1836	1st term
Frontenac	James Mathewson	1836	1st term
Glengarry	Donald Macdonell	1824	5th term
Glengarry	Alexander Chisholm	1834	2nd term
Grenville	Hiram Norton (Note: Resigned in October 1838 and went to the United States; he was replaced by Milo McCorger in a by-election.)	1831	3rd term
Grenville	Milo McCarger (Apr 1839)	1839	1st term
Grenville	William Benjamin Wells (Note: Refused to take his seat in the legislature, protesting the actions of the lieutenant governor in the elections; he was expelled in 1838 and replaced by Henry Burritt.)	1834	2nd term
Grenville	Henry Burritt (Dec 1839)	1839	1st term
Haldimand	William Hamilton Merritt	1832	3rd term
Halton	William Chisholm	1820, 1830, 1836	3rd term*
Halton	Absalom Shade	1836	1st term
Hamilton	Colin Campbell Ferrie	1836	1st term
Hastings	Edmund Murney	1836	1st term
Hastings	Anthony Manahan	1836	1st term
Huron	Robert Graham Dunlop	1835	2nd term
Kent	William McCrae	1834	2nd term
Kent	Nathan Cornwall	1834	2nd term
Kingston	Christopher Alexander Hagerman	1830	3rd term
Lanark	John A.H. Powell	1836	1st term
Lanark	Malcolm Cameron	1836	1st term
Leeds	Jonas Jones (Note: Appointed registrar for Dundas County; he was replaced by James Morris in a by-election.)	1816, 1836	4th term*
Leeds	James Morris (Dec 1837)	1837	1st term
Leeds	Ogle Robert Gowan	1834	2nd term
Lennox & Addington	John Solomon Cartwright	1836	1st term
Lennox & Addington	George Hill Detlor	1836	1st term
1st Lincoln County	Richard Woodruff	1836	1st term
2nd Lincoln	George Rykert	1834	2nd term
3rd Lincoln	David Thorburn	1835	2nd term
4th Lincoln	Gilbert McMicking	1834	2nd term
London	Mahlon Burwell	1812, 1830, 1836	5th term*
Middlesex	Thomas Parker	1834	2nd term
Middlesex	Elias Moore	1834	2nd term
Niagara (town)	Charles Richardson	1834	2nd term
Norfolk	David Duncombe	1834	2nd term
Norfolk	John Rolph (Note: Expelled from the assembly in January 1838, accused of conspiring with the rebels; he was replaced by William Salmon.)	1836	1st term
Norfolk	William Salmon (Feb 1838)	1838	1st term
Northumberland	Alexander McDonell	1834	2nd term
Northumberland	Henry Ruttan – Speaker 1837	1836	1st term
Oxford	Robert Alway	1834	2nd term
Oxford	Charles Duncombe (Note: Left the country following the Upper Canada Rebellion; Roger Rollo Hunter took his place in the legislature.)	1830	3rd term
Oxford	Roger Rollo Hunter (Feb 1839)	1839	1st term
Prescott	John Kearns	1836	1st term
Prescott	Richard Phillips Hotham	1836	1st term
Prince Edward	James Rogers Armstrong	1836	1st term
Prince Edward	Charles Bochus	1836	1st term
Russell	Thomas McKay	1834	2nd term
Simcoe	William Benjamin Robinson	1830	3rd term
Simcoe	Charles Wickens (Note: This name appears in the two references cited below; however, in other sources, the name "James Wickens" appears instead.)	1836	1st term
Stormont	Archibald McLean (Note: Appointed to the Court of King's Bench in March 1837 and replaced by Alexander McLean.)	1820	6th term
Stormont	Alexander McLean (Dec 1837)	1837	1st term
Stormont	Donald Aeneas MacDonell	1836	1st term
Toronto	William Henry Draper	1836	1st term
Wentworth	Allan Napier MacNab – Speaker 1837-1840	1830	3rd term
Wentworth	Michael Aikman	1836	1st term
1st York	David Gibson (Note: Left the country; John William Gamble took his seat in a by-election.)	1834	2nd term
1st York	John William Gamble (Feb 1838)	1838	1st term
2nd York	Edward William Thomson	1834	2nd term
3rd York	Thomas David Morrison (Note: Left Canada; James Edward Small replaced him in the assembly.)	1834	2nd term
3rd York	James Edward Small (Apr 1839)	1839	1st term
4th York	John McIntosh	1834	2nd term

== See also ==
- Legislative Council of Upper Canada
- Executive Council of Upper Canada
- Legislative Assembly of Upper Canada
- Lieutenant Governors of Upper Canada, 1791-1841
- Historical federal electoral districts of Canada
- List of Ontario provincial electoral districts
