= Court of quarter sessions =

Local court

Court of Quarter Sessions
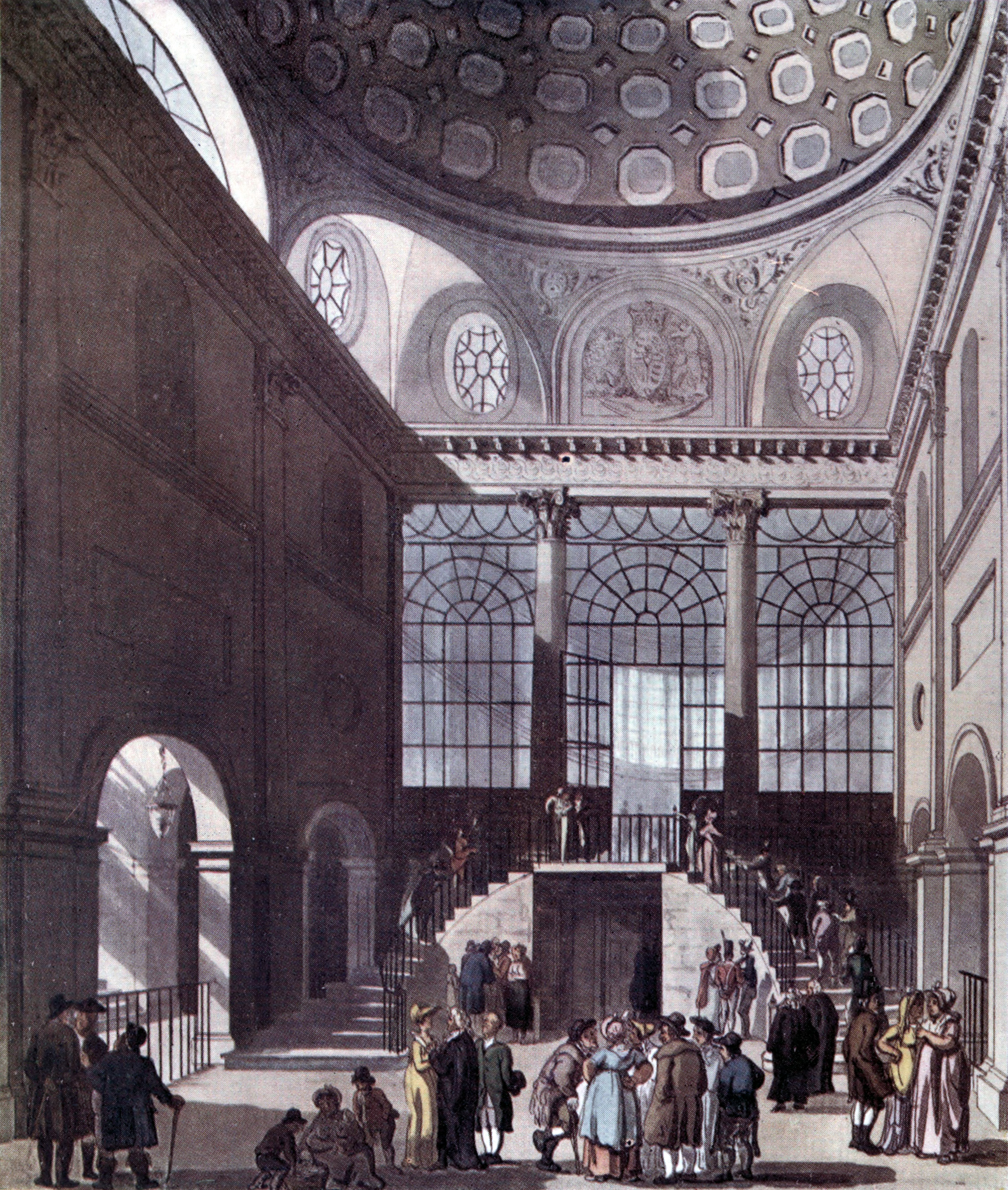
- Middlesex Sessions House in 1810
- Established: 1388
- Dissolved: 1972
- Jurisdiction: England and Wales
- Appeals to: Court of Appeal of England and Wales
- Appeals from: Magistrates' Court

The courts of quarter sessions or quarter sessions were local courts that were traditionally held at four set times each year in the Kingdom of England from 1388; they were extended to Wales following the Laws in Wales Act 1535. Scotland established quarter sessions in the 17th century. Quarter sessions were also established in Ireland and British colonies overseas.

Quarter sessions generally sat in the seat of each county and county borough, and in numerous non-county boroughs which were entitled to hold their own quarter sessions, although some of the smaller boroughs lost theirs in 1951; these non-county boroughs were mainly, but not exclusively, ancient boroughs.

In 1972, all quarter sessions were abolished in England and Wales with the commencement of the Courts Act 1971, which replaced them and the assizes with a single permanent Crown Court. In Scotland, they survived until 1975, when they were abolished and replaced by district courts and later by justice of the peace courts.

The quarter sessions were named after the quarter days on which they met in England and Wales from 1388. These days were later settled as Epiphany, Easter, Midsummer, and Michaelmas sessions.

== Reputation ==
Bentley notes in English Criminal Justice in the Nineteenth Century that "the reputation of such courts remained consistently bad throughout the century" due to failure by chairmen to take proper note of evidence, display of open bias against prisoners, and the severity of sentences compared to the assizes. Chairmen of county sessions did not originally have to be legally qualified, though the jurisdiction of county quarter sessions was extended to cover a wider range of offences if they had appointed a legally-qualified chairman. From 1962, it was required that all chairmen had to be legally qualified. Occasionally, county court or High Court judges accepted appointment, as it was a part-time one.

== Jurisdiction ==
The quarter sessions generally heard crimes that could not be tried summarily by the justices of the peace without a jury in petty sessions, which were sent up by the process of indictment to be heard in quarter sessions.

The quarter sessions did not have jurisdiction to hear the most serious crimes, most notably those subject to capital punishment or later life imprisonment. These crimes were sent for trial at the periodic assizes.

=== Civil ===
The courts of quarter sessions, throughout, had a narrow civil jurisdiction; however, until the Local Government Act 1888 created elected county councils, they also provided or authorised much major infrastructure and services that needed to span more than one vestry for their respective counties.

Most of such powers were delegated to committees, given specific responsibilities, of members – magistrates. Most of these administrative functions were transferred to county councils when they were established in 1888.

These functions and powers included:

- Supervision of how the vestries (of each poor law parish) were administering the English Poor Laws before 1834
- Repair of roads and bridges (and appointment of county surveyors)
- Highway diversions and closure (stopping up of rights of way)
- Construction and maintenance of county buildings
  - Administration of the county jail(s)
- Supervision of public and private lunatic asylums
- Supervision and organisation of petty sessions (more local sittings of the magistrates themselves)
- Licensing of public houses
- The county militia, particularly per the Militia Act 1802 to contribute to an Old Militia to number, that year, 51,489 men in England and Wales and at times a "Supplementary Militia" of half as many again which could be raised with parliamentary approval.
- The police
- Managing their finances mainly by setting county rates (see Rates in the United Kingdom), also borrowing and repaying when and how the law permitted such as against the security of a toll bridge.

== Organisation ==
The quarter sessions in each county were made up of two or more justices of the peace, presided over by a chairman, who sat with a jury. County boroughs and other boroughs entitled to their own quarter sessions had a single recorder instead of a bench of justices.

Every court of quarter sessions had a clerk called the clerk of the peace. For county quarter sessions, this person was appointed by the custos rotulorum of the county – the justice of the peace for the county charged with custody of its rolls and records. There was a large fee income for the clerk, and he was usually a friend or relative of the custos. The clerk rarely discharged the duties of the office himself, but appointed a solicitor to act as his deputy in return for a share of the fees. After 1852, payment by salary was gradually brought in instead of fees.

In some counties there were multiple quarter sessions, quite apart from those held by the county boroughs and boroughs with their own quarter sessions: for example, Yorkshire had its North Riding, West Riding, and East Riding; whilst Northamptonshire's Soke of Peterborough was administered separately. These divisions were carried over into the administrative counties that county councils covered.

=== Non-county borough quarter sessions ===
Under the Justices of the Peace Act 1949, the non-county boroughs of then fewer than 20,000 residents lost their own quarter sessions on 1 October 1951.

- Berwick-upon-Tweed
- Bideford
- Bridgnorth
- Carmarthen
- Chichester
- Faversham
- Haverfordwest
- Hythe
- Ludlow
- Maldon
- Oswestry
- Richmond
- Liberty of Ripon
- Rye
- Saffron Walden
- Sandwich
- South Molton
- Stamford
- Sudbury
- Tenterden
- Thetford
- Tiverton
- Warwick
- Wenlock

That act also created a separate quarter sessions for the Isle of Wight.

The more populous non-county boroughs continued to hold their own quarter sessions, until they were abolished in 1972 by the Courts Act 1971.

- Abingdon
- Andover
- Banbury
- Barnstaple
- Bedford
- Bridgwater
- Cambridge
- Carlisle
- Bury St. Edmunds
- Colchester
- Deal
- Devizes
- Dover
- Folkestone
- Grantham
- Gravesend
- Guildford
- Hereford
- King's Lynn
- Lichfield
- Maidstone
- Margate
- Newark
- Newbury
- Newcastle-under-Lyme
- Penzance
- Pontefract
- Poole
- Rochester
- Salisbury
- Scarborough
- Shrewsbury
- Swindon
- Winchester
- Windsor (officially New Windsor)

== Use by country or territory ==
=== Australia ===
Quarter sessions were also held in the colony of New South Wales.

=== Canada ===
==== Lower Canada ====
The courts of quarter sessions of the peace was created in August 1764 and headed by a chairman in each district. In Montreal, the Governor of Montreal was replaced with the Court of Quarter Sessions Chairman.

List of quarter session courts in Lower Canada from 1763 to 1790:

- Montreal District
- Quebec District
- Trois-Rivières District

In 1791, 27 districts were created to replace the role of the three founding districts. In 1832 when Montreal was incorporated as a city the role of the Mayor of Montreal replaced the quarter sessions chairman and that of the court by Montreal City Council.

==== Upper Canada ====
A Court of Quarter Sessions was held four times a year in each district to oversee the administration of the district and deal with legal cases in the Province of Upper Canada (later Province of Canada West after 1841). It was created in 1788 and remained in effect until 1849 when local governments and courts were assigned to county governments to replace the district system created in the 1780s.

List of Quarter Session courts in Upper Canada and later in Canada West:

- Lunenburgh District 1788–1792 – sat at New Johnstown (present-day Cornwall, Ontario)
  - Eastern District, Upper Canada 1792–1849
    - Johnstown District, Upper Canada 1798–1849 – carved out from Eastern District
      - Bathurst District 1822–1849 – carved out from Johnstown District
        - Dalhousie District 1838–1849
- Mecklenburg District 1788–1792 – sat at Kingston (now Kingston, Ontario)
  - Midland District, Upper Canada 1792–1849
    - Prince Edward District, Upper Canada 1831
    - Victoria District, Upper Canada 1837
- Nassau District 1788–1792 – sat at Newark (Niagara-on-the-Lake) and later at York, Upper Canada (later Toronto)
  - Home District 1792–1849
    - Niagara District 1798–1849
    - Gore District, Upper Canada 1816–1849
      - Wellington District 1838–1849
    - Simcoe District, Upper Canada 1837
- Hesse District 1788–1792 – sat at Sandwich (now Windsor, Ontario)
  - Western District, Upper Canada 1792–1849
    - London District, Upper Canada 1798–1849
      - Brock District, Upper Canada and Talbot District, Upper Canada 1837–1849
      - Huron District, Upper Canada 1838–1849

==== Pre-Confederation ====
- Court of Quarter Sessions for the Middle Division, Nova Scotia

=== India and Malaysia ===
In India, Bangladesh and Malaysia, the quarter sessions have evolved into permanent Sessions Courts.

=== United Kingdom ===
==== England and Wales ====
Quarter sessions in England originated in the reign of Edward III, when men were appointed in every county to keep the peace from 1327; by 1368 these justices of the peace had been empowered to hear and determine criminal matters, and by 1388 they were required to convene four times a year. Operating as the intermediate tier of the criminal court system between the magistrates' courts below and the assizes above, quarter sessions heard the bulk of indictable offences in England and Wales. Their criminal jurisdiction was progressively defined over the centuries: by the Quarter Sessions Act 1842, the courts' authority over the most serious offences including treason, murder, and felonies carrying a sentence of penal servitude for life was removed and reserved for the assizes. In 1914, their role was further extended when they received appellate jurisdiction over certain decisions of the petty sessions.

Beyond their judicial function, the courts exercised broad administrative authority over their counties for much of their history, overseeing roads, bridges, poor law administration, alehouse licensing, and county finances. Most of these non-judicial functions passed to the newly created elected county councils following the Local Government Act 1888. Quarter sessions were abolished throughout England and Wales with effect from 1 January 1972, when the Courts Act 1971 came into force and replaced them together with the assizes with the unified permanent Crown Court.

==== Ireland ====
There were quarter sessions courts for each county and county of a city or town as well as the boroughs of Derry, Kinsale, and Youghal. The recorder of the court sat alone. In Dublin city, which had no assizes, the quarter sessions court had cognizance of all crimes committed within the city's boundaries except treason. The Municipal Corporations (Ireland) Act 1840 abolished many city and borough courts, but Dublin, Cork, Galway and Carrickfergus retained their courts of quarter sessions.

In 1867, the Attorney-General for Ireland, Hedges Eyre Chatterton, issued guidelines to regulate which cases ought to be tried at assizes rather than quarter sessions: treason, murder, treason felony, rape, perjury, assault with intent to murder, party processions, election riots, and all offences of a political or insurrectionary character.

Quarter sessions were abolished in the Irish Free State under the Courts of Justice Act 1924. Their jurisdiction (together with that of the assizes and the county courts) was largely transferred to the Circuit Court.

==== Scotland ====
Quarter sessions were established in Scotland by an act of the Parliament of Scotland, the Justices of the Peace Act 1661 (c. 338), which directed justices of the peace to meet together in each county on the first Tuesday of March, May and August, and the last Tuesday of October. Often quarter sessions were delayed, in which case they met as general sessions. Quarter sessions were abolished alongside other local courts by the District Courts (Scotland) Act 1975 (c. 20), which moved justices of the peace to sit in a uniform series of district courts, since replaced by justice of the peace courts.

=== United States ===
Courts of quarter sessions also existed in North American colonies and were sometimes known as courts of general sessions. When the United States became an independent country, these courts of general sessions became independent of those Britain and were gradually replaced by other court systems, although the name "court of quarter sessions" or "quarterly court" was retained for some county legislative bodies in some jurisdictions.

In Pennsylvania, the courts of general sessions continued until the constitution of that Commonwealth was rewritten in 1968 and the courts' jurisdiction was placed under the pre-existing courts of common pleas in each county.

In New York, the Court of Quarter Sessions was established on October 17, 1683, by the first assembly in New York. It had jurisdiction over both civil and criminal matters until 1691, when it was restricted to felony crimes not punishable by death or life imprisonment. The court was abolished in all counties of New York except New York County (now Manhattan). In New York County, the Court of General Sessions continued until 1962 when its scope devolved to the New York Supreme Court (a trial-level court of general jurisdiction not to be confused with the highest court of the New York system, which is called the New York Court of Appeals). At the time when it was abolished, the Court of General Sessions of New York County was the oldest criminal court in the United States.

In the Northwest Territory, Governor Arthur St. Clair modeled county government on that of Pennsylvania. In each county, a court of quarter sessions of the peace, composed of three or more justices of the peace, served as the administrative and fiscal board of the county. In 1804, after Ohio became a state, the courts of quarter sessions of the peace were replaced by boards of county commissioners.

== See also ==
- Courts of England and Wales

== Bibliography ==
- Baker, John (1990). An Introduction to English Legal History (3rd ed.). Butterworths. ISBN 0-406-53101-3.
- Craies, William Feilden (1911). "Quarter Sessions, Court of" . In Chisholm, Hugh (ed.). Encyclopædia Britannica. Vol. 22 (11th ed.). Cambridge University Press. pp. 713–715.
- McEldowney, John F; O'Higgins, Paul (1990). The common law tradition: essays in Irish legal history. Irish Academic Press. p. 133. ISBN 978-0-7165-2397-0.
- Whitaker, Joseph (1968). Whitaker's Almanack (100th ed.). London: J Whitaker & Sons Ltd.
