= Thomas Mears =

Upper Canada politician

Thomas Mears (c. 1775 – October 16, 1832) was a businessman and political figure in Upper Canada.

== Life and work ==
Thomas Mears was born in the Thirteen Colonies in about 1775. He settled in West Hawkesbury Township. He set up a sawmill and gristmill on the Ottawa River in that area with David Pattee, which later became the basis for the town of Hawkesbury.

He was named justice of the peace in the Eastern District in 1806 and in the Ottawa District in 1816. He was elected to the Legislative Assembly of Upper Canada for Prescott in 1808 and was reelected in 1812.

He was named sheriff in the Eastern District in 1816. Around 1811, Mears and Pattee's timber operations were taken over by George and William Hamilton when they were unable to deliver goods to repay advances paid by the Hamiltons. Mears also operated the first steamboat on the Ottawa River, the Union. In 1819, Mears took over the operation of a sawmill originally built by Joseph Papineau on the Petite-Nation River near Plaisance in Lower Canada.

He died in West Hawkesbury in 1832.
