= List of people from Ottawa =

This is a list of notable people who are associated with Ottawa, Ontario, Canada:

== A ==
Name	Birth year	Death year	Description	Image	Refs
Hugh Acheson	1971		Chef		
Bill Adkins	circa 1889	1982	Stage manager		
Thomas Ahearn	1855	1938	Inventor and businessman, holder of several patents, driving force behind Ottawa's streetcar system	Thomas Ahearn	
Frank Amyot	1904	1962	Sportsperson, Canada's only gold medal winner from the 1936 Summer Olympics		
Thomas Victor Anderson	1881	1972	Former chief of the Army Staff		
Paul Anka	1941		Singer	Paul Anka	
Eli Ankou	1994		NFL player	Eli Ankou	
Margaret Atwood	1939		Writer	Margaret Atwood	
Emily Austin			Writer		
Eva Avila	1987		Singer, 4th season Canadian Idol champion	Eva Avila	
Dan Aykroyd	1952		Comedian, singer, actor and screenwriter	Dan Akroyd	
Peter Aylen	1799	1868	Businessperson, timber producer		

== B ==
Name	Birth year	Death year	Description	Image	Refs
Janis Babson	1950	1961	Organ donor, subject of two books	Janis Babson	
Jamie Baker	1966		Former NHL player		
Jay Baruchel	1983		Actor, screenwriter, comedian	Jay Baruchel	
Brendan Bell	1983		NHL and AHL player	Brendan Bell	
Belly	1984		Rapper		
Clint Benedict	1892	1976	NHL goaltender and hockey hall of famer; credited as first goaltender to don a mask in an NHL game and as an early pioneer of the butterfly style		
Louis-Théodore Besserer	1785	1861	Lieutenant during War of 1812, notary, political figure, land use developer in neighbourhood now known as Sandy Hill		
Braddish Billings	1783	1864	Early settler for whom the community of Billings Bridge was named		
Elkanah Billings	1820	1876	Paleontologist	Elkanah Billings	
Thomas Birkett	1844	1920	Former mayor of Ottawa and member of the House of Commons of Canada	Thomas Birkett	
Robert Blackburn	1828	1894	Lumber merchant, member of the House of Commons of Canada	Robert Blackburn	
Fedir Bohatyrchuk	1892	1984	Chess master and politician		
Jean Bonhomme	1937	1986	Operatic tenor		
John Rudolphus Booth	1827	1925	Lumber and railway baron	John Rudolphus Booth	
Mark Borowiecki	1989		NHL player		
Billy Boucher	1899	1958	Former NHL player		
Mark Bourrie	1957		Author, journalist and lawyer		
Matt Bradley	1978		Former NHL player	Matt Bradley	
Fred Brathwaite	1972		Former NHL player	Fred Brathwaite	
Rod Brind'Amour	1970		Former NHL player	Rod Brind'Amour	
Dave Brockie	1963	2014	Frontman for metal band Gwar	Dave Brockie	
Maurice Brodie	1903	1939	Polio researcher	Maurice Brodie	
Erskine Henry Bronson	1844	1920	Businessperson and politician	Erskine Henry Bronson	
Henry Franklin Bronson	1817	1889	Lumber baron	Henry Franklin Bronson	
Élisabeth Bruyère	1818	1876	Founder of the Sisters of Charity of Bytown, the city's first hospital, and the first bilingual school in Ontario		
Chris Bumstead	1995		Bodybuilder with six Mr. Olympia Classic Physique wins (2019–2024)		
Nathan Burgoine			Writer		
Thomas Burrowes	1796	1866	Artist, noted for artworks he created while serving as a surveyor and overseer during the construction of the Rideau Canal		
Tom Butler	1951		Actor		
John By	1779	1836	Lieutenant colonel, overseer of the construction of the canal and founder of the city	John By	
Paul Byron	1989		Forward for Montreal Canadiens		

== C ==
Name	Birth year	Death year	Description	Image	Refs
Ernie Calcutt	1932	1984	Ottawa Rough Riders announcer on CFRA radio, Canadian Football Hall of Fame and Ottawa Sport Hall of Fame inductee		
Hélène Campbell	1991		Organ donation campaigner		
Noah Cantor	1971		Former CFL player		
Clara H. Sully Carhart	1843	1913	Educator and reformer	Clara H. Sully Carhart	
John Carling	1828	1911	Founder of the Ontario Agricultural College and the Central Experimental Farm	John Carling	
Bruce Cassidy	1965		Former NHL player and former NHL head coach of the Vegas Golden Knights		
Tom Cavanagh	1963		Actor	Tom Cavanagh	
Cody Ceci	1993		NHL player	Cody Ceci	
Parri Ceci	1961		CFL player		
Sarah Chalke	1976		Actress	Sarah Chalke	
Keshia Chanté	1988		Singer-songwriter, television personality, actress	Keisha Chanté	
Bob Chiarelli	1941		Politician, former mayor of Ottawa		
King Clancy	1903	1986	Former NHL player, referee, coach, and executive	King Clancy	
Catherine Clark	1976		Television broadcaster and daughter of former Prime Minister Joe Clark	Catherine Clark	
Bryan Cochrane	1957		Curler		
Bruce Cockburn	1945		Folk/rock guitarist and singer-songwriter	Bruce Cockburn	
Samantha Cogan	1997		Ice hockey player for PWHL Toronto		
Eldon Coombe	1941		Curler		
Bill Cowley	1912	1993	Hall of Fame hockey star, NHL scoring champion 1941, founder of Ottawa 67's		
Alex Cullen	1951		Politician, former MPP and member of Ottawa City Council		
Barry Cullen	1935		Former NHL player	Barry Cullen	
Brian Cullen	1933		Former NHL player	Brian Cullen	
Elisha Cuthbert	1982		Actress		

== D ==
Name	Birth year	Death year	Description	Image	Refs
Gabriela Dabrowski	1992		Tennis player	Gabriela Dabrowski	
Sévère D'Aoust			Established a village in the region of Bearbrook in 1854	Sévère D'Aoust	
Jack Darragh	1890	1924	Former NHL player	Jack Darragh	
Jonathan David	2000		Canada men's national soccer team player	Jonathan David	
Bruce Delaney			Curler		
Paul Dewar	1963	2019	Politician, former MP	Paul Dewar	
Gabrielle Diana	1999		Social media influencer and transgender rights activist	Gabrielle Diana	
Clive Doucet	1946		Writer and politician	Clive Doucet	
Pierre Dufault	1934		Radio-Canada journalist and sports commentator		
Cecil Duncan	1893	1979	Canadian Amateur Hockey Association president		
James Duthie	1966		Sportscaster on TSN	James Duthie	

== E ==
Name	Birth year	Death year	Description	Image	Refs
Ben Eager	1984		NHL and AHL player	Ben Eager	
Kathleen Edwards	1978		Singer-songwriter and musician	Kathleen Edwards	
John Egan	1811	1857	Businessman and politician	John Egan	
Chris Evans	1847	1917	Farmer and teamster turned outlaw		

== F ==
Name	Birth year	Death year	Description	Image	Refs
John Fauquier	1909	1981	Aviator and Royal Canadian Air Force bomber pilot		
Kaseem Ferdinand	2001		Canadian gridiron football player		
Shulamith Firestone	1945	2012	Radical feminist, writer and activist		
Graham Fraser	1946		Journalist and commissioner of Official Languages		

== G ==
Name	Birth year	Death year	Description	Image	Refs
Jeremy Gara	1978		Drummer for Arcade Fire	Jeremy Gara	
Chris Gardner	1985		Curler		
Derek Gee	1997		Cyclist		
Brendan Gillanders	1990		CFL player		
Paul Girodo	1973		CFL player		
Wallis Giunta	1985		Opera singer		
Igor Gouzenko	1919	1982	Soviet defector		
Luba Goy	1945		Humanitarian, actress, comedian, Royal Canadian Air Force		
Tom Green	1971		Actor, comedian, media personality	Tom Green	
Lorne Greene	1915	1987	Actor and musician	Lorne Greene	
Nancy Greene	1943		Skier and member of the Senate of Canada	Nancy Greene	
Erik Gudbranson	1992		Ice hockey player for the Columbus Blue Jackets		

== H ==
Name	Birth year	Death year	Description	Image	Refs
George Hamilton	1781	1839	Lumber baron and politician		
William Hamilton		1822	Lumber baron and politician		
Jenn Hanna	1980		Curler	Jenn Hanna	
Elisabeth Harvor	1936		Novelist and poet		
Anne Heggtveit	1939		Alpine skier, gold medallist in the slalom at the 1960 Winter Olympics	Ann Heggtveit	
Robert Hervey	1820	1903	Lawyer and third mayor of Bytown	Rebert Hervey	
Edward Holland	1878	1948	Recipient of the Victoria Cross in 1900	Edward Holland	
Diane Holmes			Former member of Ottawa City Council		
Jessica Holmes	1973		Comedian and actress	Jessica Holmes	
Rachel Homan	1989		Curler; 4-time and current World Champion and 2-time Olympian Skip		
Edgar Lewis Horwood	1868	1957	Architect, served as Chief Dominion Architect 1915–1917		
Andrew Huang	1984		YouTuber, musician		
William H. Hurdman	1818	1901	Entrepreneur and community leader		

== I ==
Name	Birth year	Death year	Description	Image	Refs
Kira Isabella	1993		Country music artist	Kira Isabella	

== J ==
Name	Birth year	Death year	Description	Image	Refs
Donald Jackson	1940		Olympic figure skater		
Russ Jackson	1936		Former CFL player		
James Johnston		1849	Businessman and politician		
Hans W. Jung	1958		Former Canadian Surgeon General		

== K ==
Name	Birth year	Death year	Description	Image	Refs
Dan Kanter	1981		Musician, songwriter, producer, musical director and lead guitarist for Justin Bieber		
Wilbert Keon	1935	2019	Heart surgeon, researcher, and former member of the Senate of Canada		
Brian Kilrea	1934		Former AHL player and OHL coach and general manager		
Bruce Kirby	1929	2021	Yacht designer, dinghy and offshore racer and journalist		
Halder Kirby	1863	1924	Former AHAC player, doctor, and druggist	Halder Kirby	
Jason Kralt	1974		Former CFL player		
John Kruspe	1943		Former CFL player, public administrator, historian		
Zion Kuwonu	1999		Singer, producer, Boygroup (Prettymuch)		

== L ==
Name	Birth year	Death year	Description	Image	Refs
Bernie LaBarge	1953		Guitarist and singer-songwriter		
Keith J. Laidler	1916	2003	Pioneer in chemical kinetics and authority on the physical chemistry of enzymes		
Brent Laing	1978		Curler		
Denis Lapalme			Paralympic athlete, actor		
Clarissa Larisey	1999		Soccer player for Canada		
Craig Lauzon			Actor, writer, and comedian		
Andrew Leamy	1810	1868	Pioneer industrialist and community leader in Wrightstown, Lower Canada (Hull, Quebec)	Andrew Leamy	
Lou Lefaive	1928	2002	Canadian sports administrator and civil servant		
David Lemieux	1970		Archivist, legacy manager, producer for the Grateful Dead		
Rebecca Leslie	1996		Ice hockey forward		
Devon Levi	2001		Ice hockey goalkeeper		
Jesse Levine	1987		Canadian/US tennis player	Jesse Levine	
J. E. Stanley Lewis	1888	1970	Former mayor of Ottawa		
Rich Little	1938		Impressionist and voice actor	Rich Little	
Donal Logue	1965		Actor	Donal Logue	
Chris Lovasz	1980		Internet personality		

== M ==
Name	Birth year	Death year	Description	Image	Refs
Eddie MacCabe	1927	1998	Sports journalist and writer with the Ottawa Journal and Ottawa Citizen		
Flora MacDonald	1926	2015	Humanitarian, politician, first female foreign minister in Canada		
Neil Macdonald	1957		Journalist		
Norm Macdonald	1959	2021	Stand-up comedian, writer, producer and actor	Norm Macdonald	
Steve MacLean	1954		Former astronaut and President of the Canadian Space Agency	Steve MacLean	
Edward Malloch	1801	1867	Merchant and politician		
Elizabeth Manley	1965		Olympic figure skater	Elizabeth Manley	
Peter Mansbridge	1948		Broadcaster and news anchor	Peter Mansbridge	
Blaine Marchand	1949		Writer and poet		
Princess Margriet of the Netherlands	1943		Daughter of Queen Juliana and sister of Queen Beatrix	Princess Margriet	
Kristina Maria	1989		Singer-songwriter	Kristina Maria	
K. C. Martel	1967		Actor		
Yann Martel	1963		Author best known for writing the novel Life of Pi	Yann Martel	
Bruce Matthews	1909	1991	Businessman and militia artillery officer		
Terry Matthews	1943		Business magnate and entrepreneur		
Trevor Matthews	1982		Film producer and actor		
Derek McCulloch	1964		Author of graphic novels, comics, books for children, and plays	Derek McCulloch	
Dawn McEwen	1980		Curler, gold medalist at the 2014 Winter Olympics		
Frank McGee	1882	1916	Former ice hockey player	Frank McGee	
Edward McGillivray	1815	1885	Second mayor of Ottawa		
Dalton McGuinty	1955		Former politician and premier of Ontario	Dalton McGuinty	
David McGuinty	1960		Lawyer and politician	David McGuinty	
Gavin McInnes	1970		Founder of the far-right neo-fascist Proud Boys group	Gavin McInnes	
Thomas McKay	1792	1855	Businessman and one of the founders of Ottawa		
Bob McKeown	1950		Former CFL player, journalist, investigative reporter, producer of NBC's Dateline, CBC's The Fifth Estate; documentary filmmaker		
Daniel McLachlin	1810	1872	Businessman and politician	Daniel McLachlin	
Earl McRae	1942	2011	Journalist		
Jean-Michel Ménard	1976		Curler		
Anne Merklinger	1958		Curler and CEO of Own the Podium		
Marc Methot	1985		NHL player	Marc Methot	
Stevie Mikayne			Writer		
Hugh Millikin	1957		Curler trained in Ottawa		
Elijah Mitrou-Long	1996		Canadian-Greek basketball player for Hapoel Holon of the Israeli Basketball Premier League		
Emma Miskew	1989		Curler		
Rich Moffatt			Curler		
Vanessa Morgan	1992		Actor		
John Morris	1978		Curler and 2010 Winter Olympics gold medalist		
Alanis Morissette	1974		Singer-songwriter, guitarist, record producer, and actress	Alanis Morissette	
Hannah Moscovitch	1978		Playwright, author, dramatist		
Alex Munter	1968		Former politician and journalist, CEO of CHEO	Alex Munter	

== N ==
Name	Birth year	Death year	Description	Image	Refs
Yasir Naqvi	1973		Politician	Yasir Naqvi	
Evan Nepean	1752	1822	Politician and colonial administrator	Evan Nepean	
Ryan North	1980		Webcomic and comic book writer	Ryan North	
Night Lovell	1997		Rapper	Night Lovell	

== O ==
Name	Birth year	Death year	Description	Image	Refs
Larry O'Brien	1949		Businessman and former mayor of Ottawa	Larry O'Brien	
William Ogilvie	1846	1912	Dominion land surveyor, explorer, and Commissioner of the Yukon Territory	William Ogilvie	
Sandra Oh	1971		Actress	Sandra Oh	

== P ==
Name	Birth year	Death year	Description	Image	Refs
Jean-Gabriel Pageau	1992		Hockey athlete, forward for New York Islanders	Jean-Gabriel Pageau	
Jesse Palmer	1978		Sports commentator and former NFL player	Jesse Palmer	
Richard Reed Parry	1977		Multi-instrumentalist, composer, producer, and member of Arcade Fire	Richard Reed Perry	
Frank Patrick	1885	1960	Former NHL player, coach, and general manager	Frank Patrick	
David Pattee	1778	1851	Businessman, judge, and politician		
George Halsey Perley	1857	1938	Politician and diplomat	George Halsey Perley	
William Goodhue Perley	1820	1890	Businessman and politician	William Goodhue Perley	
Matthew Perry	1969	2023	Actor	Matthew Perry	
Jean Pigott	1924	2012	Politician and businessperson		
Denis Potvin	1953		Former NHL player	Denis Potvin	
Jean Potvin	1949	2022	Former NHL player		
Gabrielle Poulin	1929	2015	Writer		
Harvey Pulford	1875	1940	Athlete and award winner in multiple sports	Harvey Pulford	
Simon Pulsifer	1981		English Wikipedia contributor	Simon Pulsifer (left)	

== Q ==
Name	Birth year	Death year	Description	Image	Refs
Silver Quilty	1891	1976	Early Canadian football player, coach, and referee; Canadian Football Hall of Fame inductee, Canada's Sports Hall of Fame indutee; president of the Canadian Amateur Hockey Association (1924–26)	Silver Quilty	

== R ==
Name	Birth year	Death year	Description	Image	Refs
Bob Rae	1948		Lawyer and former premier of Ontario	Bob Rae	
George Ramsay, 9th Earl of Dalhousie	1770	1838	Soldier and colonial administrator, former Governor of Nova Scotia, Governor General of British North America, and Commander-in-Chief, India	George Ramsay	
Joachim von Ribbentrop	1893	1946	Minister of Foreign Affairs of Nazi Germany, lived in Ottawa prior to World War I and fled Canada to avoid internment as an enemy alien		
Alexander Robillard	1843	1907	Politician		
Melanie Robillard	1982		Curler	Melanie Robillard	
Randy Robitaille	1975		Former NHL player		
John Rochester	1822	1894	Businessman, politician, and former mayor of Ottawa	John Rochester	
Erin Roger			Scientist		
Shelagh Rogers	1956		Radio broadcaster		
James Rolfe	1967		Composer		
Cristine Rotenberg	1988		YouTube personality		
Kelly Rowan	1965		Actress and former fashion model	Kelly Rowan	
Roger Rowley	1914	2007	Commanded the Stormont, Dundas and Glengarry Highlanders in 1944–1945		
Derek Roy	1983		NHL player	Derek Roy	
Kelleigh Ryan	1987		Fencer		

== S ==
Name	Birth year	Death year	Description	Image	Refs
Joëlle Sabourin	1972		Curler		
Vicki Saunders			Entrepreneur		
Martin St. Pierre	1983		Former NHL player	Martin St. Pierre	
Marc Savard	1977		Former NHL player	Marc Savard	
Craig Savill	1978		Curler		
Andrew Scott	1967		Drummer for Sloan	Andrew Scott	
Barbara Ann Scott	1928	2012	Figure skater and gold medalist at the 1948 Winter Olympics		
John Scott	1822	1857	Politician, first mayor of Bytown		
Richard William Scott	1825	1913	Lawyer and politician	Richard William Scott	
Melinda Shankar	1992		Actress	Melinda Shankar	
Marial Shayok	1995		Basketball player in the NBA and currently in the Israeli Premier Basketball League		
Hamby Shore	1886	1918	Former ice hockey player		
James Sieveright	1812		Farmer and community leader		
James Skead	1817	1884	Businessman and politician	James Skead	
Elizabeth Smart	1913	1986	Poet and novelist	Elizabeth Smart	
Shane Smith	1970		Co-founder and CEO of VICE Media		
Trevor Smith	1985		NHL player	Trevor Smith	
Sasha Sokolov	1943		Writer		
Nicholas Sparks	1794	1862	Businessman and politician		
Bruce Stuart	1881	1961	Former ice hockey player	Bruce Stuart	
Ivonka Survilla	1936		President of the Belarusian People's Republic (BNR), the Belarusian government in exile	Bruce Stuart	
Mark Sutcliffe	1968		Politician, current mayor of Ottawa	Adrian Jean	

== T ==
Name	Birth year	Death year	Description	Image	Refs
Talk (Nick Durocher)			Musician ("Run Away to Mars")		
Katie Tallo			Screenwriter, film director, and author		
Linda Thom	1943		Olympic gold medal-winning shooter	Linda Thom	
Kai Thomas			Writer		
Drew Thompson	1922	1992	Actor who co-founded the International Players in Kingston, Ontario, one of Canada's earliest professional theatre companies		
Alexandre Trudeau	1973		Philosopher, filmmaker, author, journalist		
Justin Trudeau	1971		Politician, 23rd prime minister of Canada		
Margaret Trudeau	1948		Author, actress, photographer		
Michel Trudeau	1975	1998	Scientist, environmentalist		
J. B. Turgeon	1810	1897	First French-Canadian mayor of Bytown		
Ronald Turpin	1933	1962	Murderer and one of the two last people to executed in Canada		

== V ==
Name	Birth year	Death year	Description	Image	Refs
Rick Vaive	1959		Former NHL player	Rick Vaive	
Gabriela Osio Vanden			Documentary filmmaker and cinematographer		

== W ==
Name	Birth year	Death year	Description	Image	Refs
Jeff Waters	1966		Guitarist and founder of Annihilator	Jeff Waters	
Ken Watkin	1954		Former Judge Advocate General of the Canadian Armed Forces		
Jim Watson	1961		Politician, former member of Ottawa City Council, former MPP and former mayor of Ottawa	Jim Watson	
MacKenzie Weegar	1994		NHL defenceman for the Calgary Flames, drafted by the Florida Panthers in 2013		
Isabelle Weidemann	1995		Speed skater		
Ken Westerfield	1947		Disc sport (Frisbee) pioneer; landed in Ottawa from the U.S. in 1970	Ken Westerfield	
Joel Westheimer			Professor at the University of Ottawa		
Bill Westwick	1908	1990	Sportswriter for the Ottawa Journal 1926–1973, inductee into the Ottawa Sport Hall of Fame and the Canadian Football Hall of Fame		
Ezekiel Stone Wiggins	1839	1910	Amateur meteorologist	Ezekiel Stone Wiggins	
Philemon Wright	1760	1839	Farmer, entrepreneur, and founder of Wrightstown, Lower Canada (Hull, Quebec)	Philemon Wright	
Ruggles Wright	1793	1863	Lumber merchant		

== Y ==
Name	Birth year	Death year	Description	Image	Refs
Jason Young	1979		Curler		

== See also ==
- List of Canadians
