= David Pattee =

Canadian politician

David Pattee (July 30, 1778 – February 5, 1851) was a businessman, judge and political figure in Upper Canada.

He was born in Goffstown, New Hampshire in 1778. He studied medicine but never practiced. In 1803, he left New Hampshire for the lower Ottawa River in Upper Canada because he was in debt and accused of forgery. He set up a farm and formed a partnership with Thomas Mears to operate a water-powered sawmill near the Long Sault Rapids on the river. This was the first sawmill on the western side of the Ottawa River. They established a contract to supply lumber to George and William Hamilton; when they were unable to repay advances, the Hamiltons took over the operation of the mill and Pattee returned to farming. He was named justice of the peace in the Eastern District in 1812 and in the Ottawa District in 1816. In the same year, he became a judge in the Ottawa District, serving until 1849. He also served in the local militia.

In 1820, he ran against William Hamilton for a seat in the Legislative Assembly of Upper Canada for Prescott. Hamilton was elected mainly because an associate of his brother was the returning officer. When electoral fraud was uncovered, Pattee was declared elected in 1821. The Hamiltons had uncovered the original accusations of forgery against Pattee and attempted to unseat him on that basis. Pattee was able to defend himself against these charges. He died at his home near Hawkesbury in 1851.
