= Richard Phillips Hotham =

Canadian politician

Richard Phillips Hotham (died October 10, 1840) was an English-born lawyer and political figure in Upper Canada.

He represented Prescott in the Legislative Assembly of Upper Canada from 1836 to 1840 as a Conservative member.

Hotham was named registrar for Prescott and Russell counties in 1820, moving to L'Orignal in that year. In the following year, he was named clerk of the peace and registrar for the Surrogate Court for the Ottawa District. In 1835, he was named clerk for the district court and, in 1837, inspector of licenses. Hotham died at sea during a voyage to England.
