= William Morris (Canadian businessman) =

Canadian businessman and politician

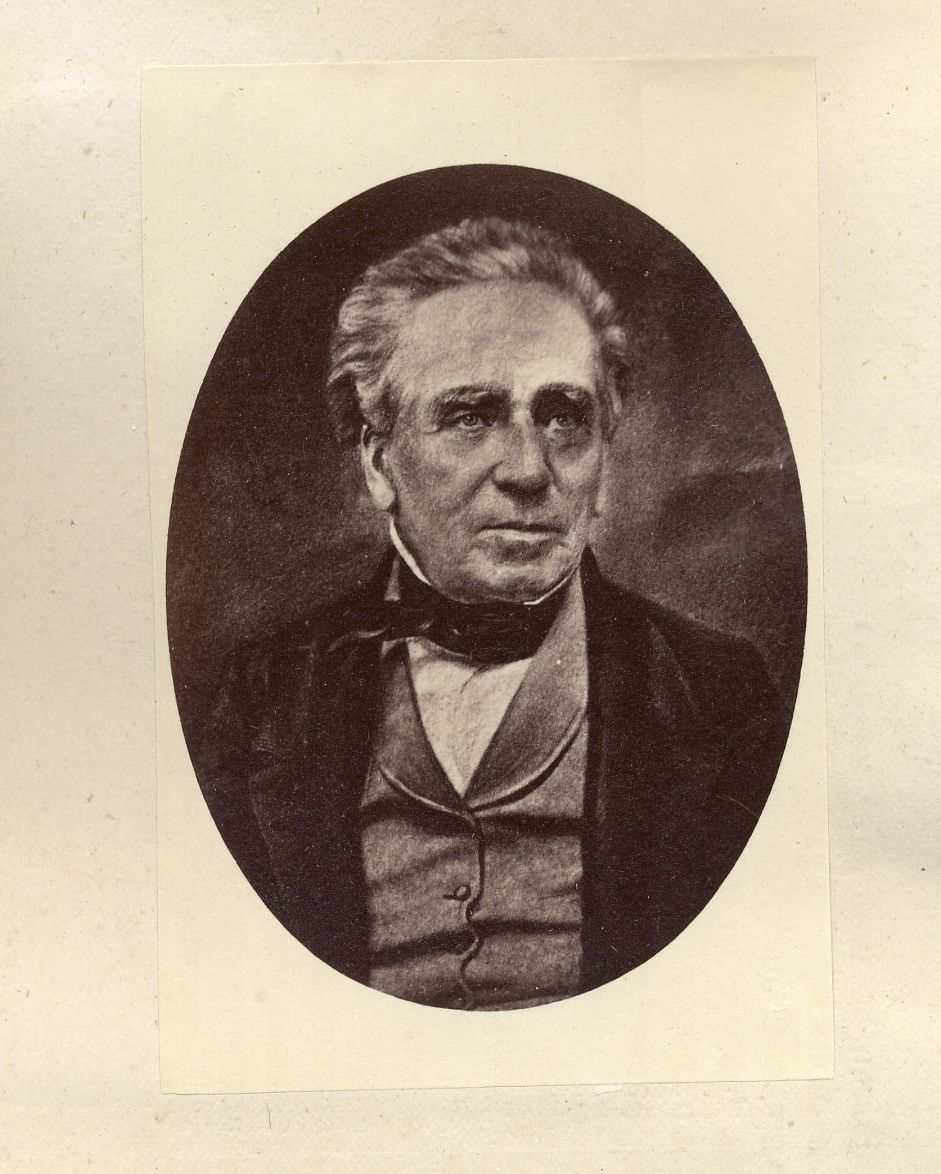

Member of the Legislative Assembly of Upper Canada for Carleton
- In office 1820–1836

Member of the Legislative Council of Upper Canada
- In office 1836–1842

Warden for the Johnstown District
- In office 1842–1844

Receiver General for the United Canadas
- In office 1844–1846

Personal details
- Born: October 31, 1787 Paisley, Renfrewshire, Scotland
- Died: June 29, 1858 (aged 70) Montreal, Quebec
- Party: Conservative
- Relations: James Morris (brother)
- Occupation: Businessman, soldier, politician
- Known for: Establishing the Presbyterian Church in Canada

Military service
- Allegiance: Upper Canada
- Branch/service: Canadian militia
- Years of service: 1812–1842
- Rank: Lieutenant-Colonel
- Unit: 1st Leeds Militia (1812–13)
- Commands: 2nd Carleton Militia (1822–1836); Lanark Militia (1837–1842)
- Battles/wars: War of 1812: Battle of Ogdensburg; Rebellions of 1837–1838

William Morris (October 31, 1786 – June 29, 1858) was a businessman and political figure in Upper Canada.

He was born in Paisley, Scotland in 1786, the son of a Scottish manufacturer. His family came to Upper Canada in 1801, where his father set up an import-export business. The business failed and his father retired to a farm near Elizabethtown (now Brockville). After the death of his father, he opened a general store with his brother, Alexander. He joined the militia during the War of 1812.

In 1816, he opened a second store in the new settlement at Perth. In 1818, he was appointed justice of the peace in the area and, in 1820, he was elected to the 8th Parliament of Upper Canada representing Carleton. He represented Carleton and then Lanark until 1836, when he was appointed to the Legislative Council. He also served as lieutenant-colonel in the local militia. He was involved in setting up the first canal connecting the Tay River to Lower Rideau Lake in 1834.

Although conservative, he was not part of the elite Family Compact, due in part to his strong affiliation with the Church of Scotland. His efforts to have the church recognized as one of the two national churches in the British Empire resulted in the creation of the Synod of the Presbyterian Church of Canada. He also played a major role in establishing Queen's College (later Queen's University) and was the first chairman of its board of trustees. He was appointed to the new Legislative Council when Upper and Lower Canada were united in 1841. In 1842, he was appointed warden for the Johnstown District. In 1844, he became receiver general for the United Canadas. In 1846, he became president of the Executive Council.

He suffered a stroke in 1853, at which point he retired from active public life; he died at Montreal in 1858.

He was the brother of politician James Morris.

== See also ==
- John Barclay
- William Bell
