= John Kearns (disambiguation) =

John Kearns (born 1987) is an English comedian.

John Kearns may also refer to:

- John Kearns (politician) (1784–1864), Irish-Canadian politician
- Jack Kearns (1882–1963), American boxer and boxing manager
- John Kearns (footballer) (1883–1928), English footballer
- Jack Kearns (footballer) (1914–1945), English footballer
- John Kearns, English disc jockey, MTV presenter, and judge on Young Star Search

== See also ==
- John Kerans, politician and Royal Navy officer
