= John Hamilton (university chancellor) =

John Hamilton (September 7, 1851 – 1939) was a Quebec merchant and from 1900 to 1926 the 7th Chancellor of Bishop's University, Lennoxville, Quebec.

Born at New Liverpool, Quebec, he was the son of Robert Hamilton, of Hamwood, Quebec, and Isabella daughter of John Thomson of Quebec. His father was a trustee of Bishop's University from 1871 to 1898 and the elder brother of John Hamilton and Charles Hamilton. John became a merchant and entered the family's timber business, started in Canada by his grandfather, George Hamilton. At some point, Hamilton gained the degrees of Master of Arts (MA) and of Doctor of Civil Law (DCL).

In 1900, he was elected the 7th Chancellor of Bishop's University. Following World War I, he was persuaded to withdraw his resignation from the post several times, but finally retired in 1925. He had been active in the affairs of the university for over forty years and was a generous contributor to the financial campaigns of 1913 and 1924. The John Hamilton Building at Bishop's was named for him in 1963, and the interest from his estates were still accruing to the university in 1979. He was President of the Champlain Society and a member of the Royal Canadian Yacht Club and the Literary and Historical Society of Quebec.

In 1877, he married Ida Mary Buchanan, daughter of Alexander Carlisle Buchanan (1808-1868), Immigration Commissioner at Quebec, and Charlotte Louise Caldwell Bowen, daughter of Chief Justice Edward Bowen, the 2nd Chancellor of Bishop's University. They lived at 'Hamwood' Quebec and kept a summer house, 'Moss Craig' at Cacouna. They were the parents of four daughters, including Mrs Arthur Carington Smith.
