= Carleton County =

Carleton County may refer to:

- Carleton County, New Brunswick, Canada
- Carleton County, Ontario, Canada

== See also ==
- Carlton County, Minnesota, US
