= Milo McCarger =

Upper Canada politician

Milo McCarger (c.1798 – January 14, 1860) was a farmer and political figure in Upper Canada.

He settled in South Gower Township and then Mountain Township. He served in the local militia and fought at the Battle of the Windmill. He served as coroner in the Johnstown District. He was elected to the Legislative Assembly of the Province of Canada for Grenville in an 1839 by-election after Hiram Norton resigned from his seat.

He died in Kemptville in 1860.
