= John Kearns (politician) =

Upper Canada politician and farmer

John Kearns (also Kearnes; 1784–1864) was an Irish-born farmer and political figure in Upper Canada. He represented Prescott in the Legislative Assembly of Upper Canada from 1836 to 1841 as a Conservative.

A Roman Catholic, Kearns received a land grant in Plantagenet Township. Kearns was a lieutenant in the British Army in the 68th (Durham) Regiment of Foot (Light Infantry) who retired on half-pay in 1819 and later served as a captain and then lieutenant-colonel in the Prescott militia. He received a Military General Service Medal with five clasps for service in Europe. He was a justice of the peace for the Ottawa District. Kearns died in Plantagenet Township.
