= Bathurst District =

Coordinates: 45°15′N 76°30′W

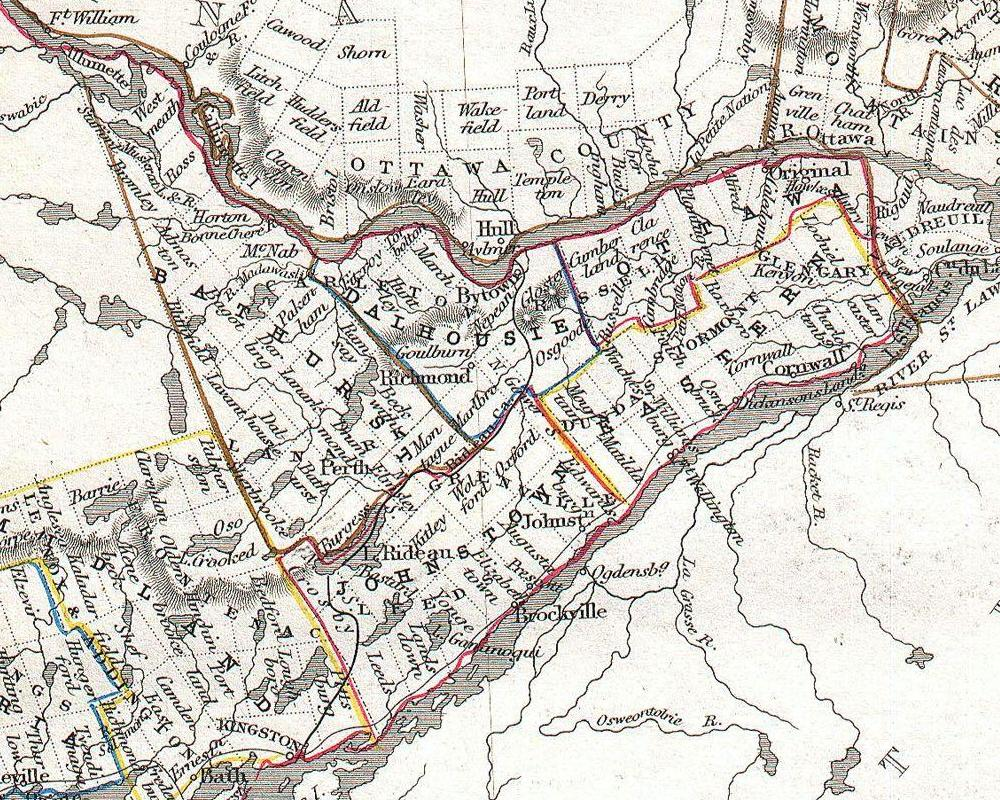
1850 map of Eastern Ontario showing Bathurst District

The Bathurst District was a historic district in Upper Canada. It was created in 1822 from the Johnstown District. Containing Carleton County, it existed until 1849. The district town was Perth.

== History ==
In 1824, Lanark County was created from part of Carleton County, so that its constituent townships were divided as follows:

Counties comprising Bathurst District (1824)
Carleton	Lanark
Nepean; Goulbourne; Huntley; March; Pakenham; Fitzroy; Tarbolton; together with such Islands in the Ottawa River as are wholly or in greater part opposite thereto	Bathurst; Drummond; Beckwith; Dalhousie; Lanark; Ramsay; Darling; Levant; North Sherbrooke; South Sherbrooke; together with all the unsurveyed lands within the District of Bathurst, and such Islands in the Ottawa River as are wholly or in greater part opposite to the said townships and unsurveyed land

In 1838, upon the creation of the Dalhousie District, the townships were reorganized as follows:

Reorganization of Bathurst and Dalhousie Districts with constituent counties (1838)
Transferred from	Dalhousie District	Bathurst District	
Transferred from	Carleton	Lanark	Renfrew
Bathurst District	Nepean; Goulbourn; Huntley; March; Fitzroy; Tarbolton	Bathurst; Drummond; Beckwith; Dalhousie; Lanark; Ramsay; Darling; Levant; North Sherbrooke; South Sherbrooke	Pakenham; McNab; Horton; Ross; Westmeath; Pembroke
Johnstown District	North Gower; Marlborough	Montague; so much of the townships of Elmsley and Burgess as lie on the north shore of the Rideau waters	
Ottawa District	Gloucester; Osgoode		

By 1845, all lands in the District had been surveyed into the following townships:

Counties comprising Bathurst District (1845) (Note: the two counties were united for electoral purposes)
Lanark	Renfrew
Bathurst; Beckwith; Drummond; Dalhousie; Darling; North Elmsley; North Burgess; Levant; Lanark; Montague; Pakenham; Ramsay; North Sherbrooke; South Sherbrooke	Admaston; Blithefield; Bagot; Bromley; Horton; McNab; Pembroke; Ross; Stafford; Westmeath

Effective January 1, 1850, Bathurst District was abolished, and the United Counties of Lanark and Renfrew replaced it for municipal and judicial purposes. (Note: the counties still remained united for electoral purposes, known as the County of Lanark'"`UNIQ--ref-00000016-QINU`"')
