= Leeds (Province of Canada electoral district) =

Province of Canada electoral district

Leeds Canada West
Province of Canada electoral district

Defunct pre-Confederation electoral district
- Legislature: Legislative Assembly of the Province of Canada
- District created: 1841
- District abolished: 1867
- First contested: 1841
- Last contested: 1863

Leeds was an electoral district of the Legislative Assembly of the Parliament of the Province of Canada, in the eastern area of Canada West (now Ontario). Leeds was created in 1841, upon the establishment of the Province of Canada by the union of Upper Canada and Lower Canada. It was based on Leeds County, located on the north shore of the Saint Lawrence River.

Leeds was represented by one member in the Legislative Assembly. It was abolished in 1867, upon the creation of Canada and the province of Ontario.

== Boundaries ==
Leeds electoral district was based on Leeds County (now included in the United Counties of Leeds and Grenville). It was located in the eastern area of Canada West, on the north shore of the Saint Lawrence River. Brockville was the major centre for the riding, although it was a separate electoral district.

The Union Act, 1840 had merged the two provinces of Upper Canada and Lower Canada into the Province of Canada, with a single Parliament. The separate parliaments of Lower Canada and Upper Canada were abolished. The Union Act provided that the pre-existing electoral boundaries of Upper Canada would continue to be used in the new Parliament, unless altered by the Union Act itself.

Leeds County had been an electoral district in the Legislative Assembly of Upper Canada. The general outline of the boundaries was not altered by the Act. The boundaries had originally been set by a proclamation of the first Lieutenant Governor of Upper Canada, John Graves Simcoe, in 1792:

That the fifth of the said counties be hereafter called by the name of the county of Leeds; which county is to be bounded on the east by the westernmost line of the county of Grenvill, on the south by the river St. Lawrence, and on the west by the easternmost boundary line of the late township of Pittsburgh, running north until it intersects the Ottawa or Grand river, thence descending the said river until it meets the northwesternmost boundary of the county of Grenvill. The said county of Leeds is to comprehend all the islands in the said river St. Lawrence nearest the said county, in the whole or greater part fronting the same.

The boundaries had been further defined by a statute of Upper Canada in 1798:

That the townships of Elizabethtown, Yonge, (including what was formerly called Escot,) Lansdown, Leeds, Crosby, Bastard, Burgess, Elmsley and Kitley, together with such of the Islands in the river Saint Lawrence as are wholly or in greater part opposite thereto, do constitute and form the County of Leeds.

Since Leeds was not changed by the Union Act, those boundaries continued to be used for the new electoral district, with one significant change: the Union Act provided that the town of Brockville would be a separate electoral district. Brockville therefore ceased to be included in Leeds electoral district.

== Members of the Legislative Assembly ==
Leeds was represented by one member in the Legislative Assembly. The following were the members for Leeds.

Parliament	Years	Member	Party
1st Parliament; 1841–1844	1841–1844	James Morris	Unionist; Reform

== Abolition ==
The electoral district was abolished on July 1, 1867, when the British North America Act, 1867 came into force, creating Canada and splitting the Province of Canada into Quebec and Ontario. It was succeeded by electoral districts Leeds North and Grenville North, and Leeds South, in both the House of Commons of Canada and the Legislative Assembly of Ontario.
