= John Barclay (clergyman) =

John Barclay (9 July 1795 – 26 September 1826) was a Church of Scotland clergyman.

Barclay was born in Scotland and trained for the ministry there arriving in Kingston, Upper Canada in 1821. There he became embroiled in an ongoing conflict with the Church of England in the person of the Reverend George Okill Stuart. He fought the Church of England on various issues to advance the rights of the Scottish church and Scottish nationalism. This issue continued long after his early death.

== See also ==
- William Morris
