= William Hamilton (lumber baron) =

Upper Canada lumber merchant and politician

William Hamilton (died 1822 in Upper Canada) was a lumber merchant and political figure in Upper Canada.

He was born in Ireland and came to Quebec City with his brother George sometime before 1807. They were originally in the business of importing goods but later became involved in the timber trade. In 1811, they took over the operation of a sawmill near the current location of Hawkesbury when the original owners were unable to repay funds paid in advance for lumber. William moved to Hawkesbury to take charge of the operation. He served as a captain in the local militia during the War of 1812. He was named justice of the peace in the Eastern District in 1812 and in the Ottawa District in 1816. In 1816, he retired from the lumber business.

He was elected to the Legislative Assembly of Upper Canada in 1820, but was unseated in the following year when it became evident that the electoral officer, an associate of his brother, had tampered with the results.
