= Midland District, Upper Canada =

Former district of the Province of Quebec

Coordinates: 44°40′N 77°10′W

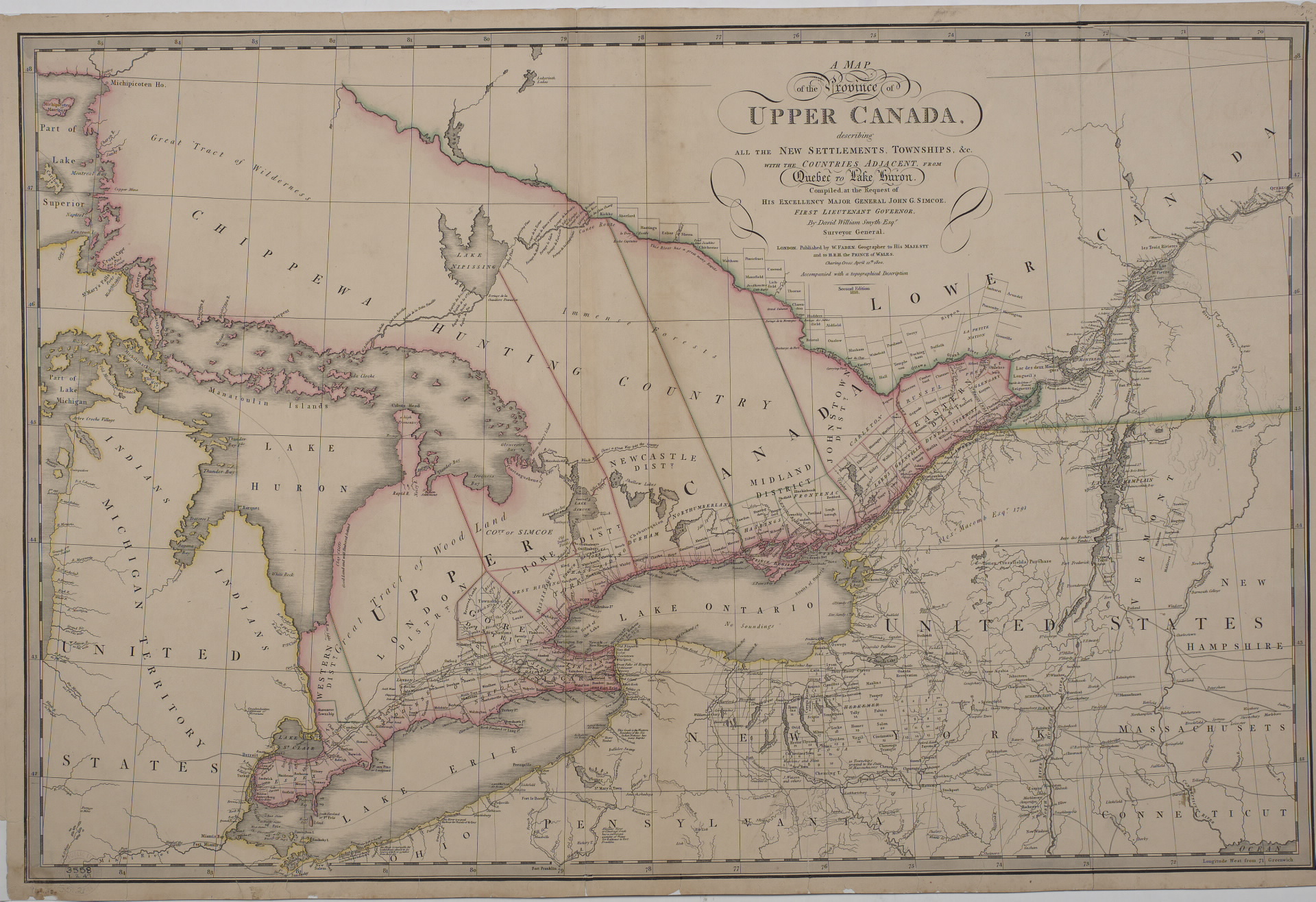
1818 map of Ontario showing Midland District

Midland District was one of four districts of the Province of Quebec created in 1788 in the western reaches of the Montreal District and partitioned in 1791 to create the new colony of Upper Canada.

== Historical evolution ==
The District, originally known as Mecklenburg District (named after Mecklenburg Castle in the Mecklenburg region of Germany), was constituted in 1788 in the Province of Quebec, and was described as:

... extending within the north and south bounds of our province, extending from the western limits of the said district of Luneburg, as far westerly as to a north and south line, intersecting the mouth of a river now called the Trent, discharging itself from the west into the head of the bay of Quinty, and therein comprehending the several towns and tracts called or known by the names of Pittsburg, Kingstown, Ernestown, Fredericksburg, Adolphustown, Marysburg, Sophiasburg, Ameliasburg, Sydney, Thurlow, Richmond and Camden...

In 1792, the following electoral counties were established in the District:

- Addington
- Frontenac
- Hastings
- Lennox
- Ontario
- Prince Edward

The District was renamed as "Midland District" in 1792, and its jail and courthouse were established in Kingston.

At the beginning of 1800, Lennox and Addington were combined to form the incorporated counties of Lennox and Addington, and the islands comprising Ontario were divided between Frontenac and Lennox and Addington. The general boundaries of the District were also altered so that it comprised:

... the counties of Frontenac, the incorporated counties of Lenox and Addington, Hastings, and Prince Edward, with all that tract of land which lies between the district of Johnstown and a line drawn north, fifteen degrees west from the north west angle of the township of Rawdon, till it intersects the northern limits of the Province, together with all the islands in the Ottawa River, wholly, or in greater part opposite thereto...

In 1829, Hugh Macdonald (the father of future first Canadian Prime Minister John A. Macdonald, who at the time would have been ~14 years old) was appointed magistrate for the Midland District.

Prince Edward County was separated in 1831 to form Prince Edward District, and Hastings County was split off in 1837 to form Victoria District. Lennox and Addington regained their separate identities in 1845, but still remained united for electoral purposes.

At the beginning of 1850, the district was abolished, and the United Counties of Frontenac, Lennox and Addington replaced it for municipal and judicial purposes.

== See also ==
- Kingston Collegiate and Vocational Institute - founded in 1807 as Midland Grammar School replacing Kingston Grammar School (c. 1792)
