= James Mathewson =

Upper Canada politician

James Mathewson (died January 9, 1843) was an Irish-born miller, lumberman and political figure in Upper Canada. He represented Frontenac in the Legislative Assembly of Upper Canada from 1836 to 1841 as a Conservative.

He was born in County Antrim. Mathewson lived in Pittsburgh Mills, Pittsburgh Township. He was a justice of the peace for the Midland District. Mathewson was an Anglican. He died in Pittsburgh Mills.
