= Gatineau Privilege =

The Gatineau Privilege referred to a monopoly introduced to limit the cutting of timber along the Gatineau River in Lower Canada from 1832 to 1843.

Quotas were established for each participant and no other timber companies were allowed to cut wood in that area. The participants were:

- several descendants of Philemon Wright:
  - Ruggles Wright
  - Tiberius Wright
  - Christopher Columbus Wright
- Peter Aylen
- Thomas McGoey, a son-in-law of Philemon Wright, Jr.
- George Hamilton
- Charles Adamson Low

The lumber merchants built roads into the area and established farms to take care of the animals used to remove the logs.

In 1843, the Crown Timber Act brought an end to the Gatineau Privilege. Cutting rights for all crown lands were purchased at an office in Bytown, the former name of Ottawa, Ontario, Canada.
