= Vicki Saunders =

Canadian entrepreneur

Vicki Saunders is a Canadian entrepreneur and founder of Coralus (formerly SheEO), a global initiative that provides funding to women-led and non-binary-led ventures through a community-based funding model.

== Career ==
In 2015, Saunders founded SheEO, a Toronto-based initiative that uses pooled member contributions to provide venture capital for ventures led by women entrepreneurs. The organization states that its model is an alternative to traditional venture capital that aims to address barriers faced by women entrepreneurs. The organization later rebranded as Coralus in 2022.

== Coralus (formerly SheEO) ==
The SheEO model involves groups of contributors, known as "Activators," who pool funds to support women-led ventures. According to Fast Company, the model initially brought together groups of approximately 500 contributors who each contributed funds to support selected ventures.

Ventures are selected based on their potential for revenue generation and social impact. Funds are distributed and later repaid, creating a revolving pool of capital for future ventures. The model emphasizes collaboration and community participation over competition and traditional investment structures. According to the Toronto Star, the initiative's stated aim is to 'help women change the world - one entrepreneur at a time'.

== Philosophy and approach ==
Saunders has been described by UBS as associated with the concept of "radical generosity" and encouraging an approach that works "in relationship with their community". Her work has been described as part of a broader shift toward alternative investment models that combine financial sustainability with social impact.

== Recognition and awards ==
Saunders has received several awards and recognitions, including:

- Named a Global Leader for Tomorrow by the World Economic Forum (2001)
- Business Leader of the Year, Toronto Region Board of Trade (2019)
- Named a UBS Global Visionary (2020)
- Women of Distinction Award (Entrepreneurship), YWCA Toronto (2020/2021)

== Publications ==
- Saunders, Vicki (2017). Think Like a SheEO: succeeding in the age of creators, makers and entrepreneurs. Barlow Books. ISBN 978-1-5031-0365-8

== Media coverage ==
Saunders and her work have been featured in:

- Forbes
- The Globe and Mail
- Toronto Star
- Fast Company
- Inc Magazine
- Impact Boom

== See also ==
- Social entrepreneurship
- Impact investing
- Regenerative economics
- List of people from Ottawa
