= James Rogers Armstrong =

Upper Canada politician

- Born: April 17, 1787
- Died: July 13, 1873 (aged 86); Whitby, Ontario, Canada
- Occupations: Businessman, Political Figure
- Known for: Member of the 13th Parliament of Upper Canada
- Children: James Rogers Armstrong (son)
- Relatives: Col. James Rogers (grandfather)

James Rogers Armstrong (April 17, 1787 – July 13, 1873) was a businessman and political figure in Upper Canada.

He was born in Dorchester (Iberville) in Quebec in 1787, he was a grandson of Loyalist, Col. James Rogers and studied in Vermont after both his parents died during the early 1790s. He settled in Hallowell Township in Prince Edward County in Upper Canada in 1807. He later went into business as a merchant in Picton and Kingston and, in 1828, opened a store in York (Toronto). In 1836, he was elected to the 13th Parliament of Upper Canada representing Prince Edward. He was appointed a justice of the peace in the Home District in 1837. In the 1840s, he opened a foundry which manufactured stoves. His son, also named James Rogers Armstrong, took over the family business in 1856 when his father retired to Whitby. James Senior died in Whitby in 1873.
