= Montreal District =

- Former District in the British Province of Quebec and New France
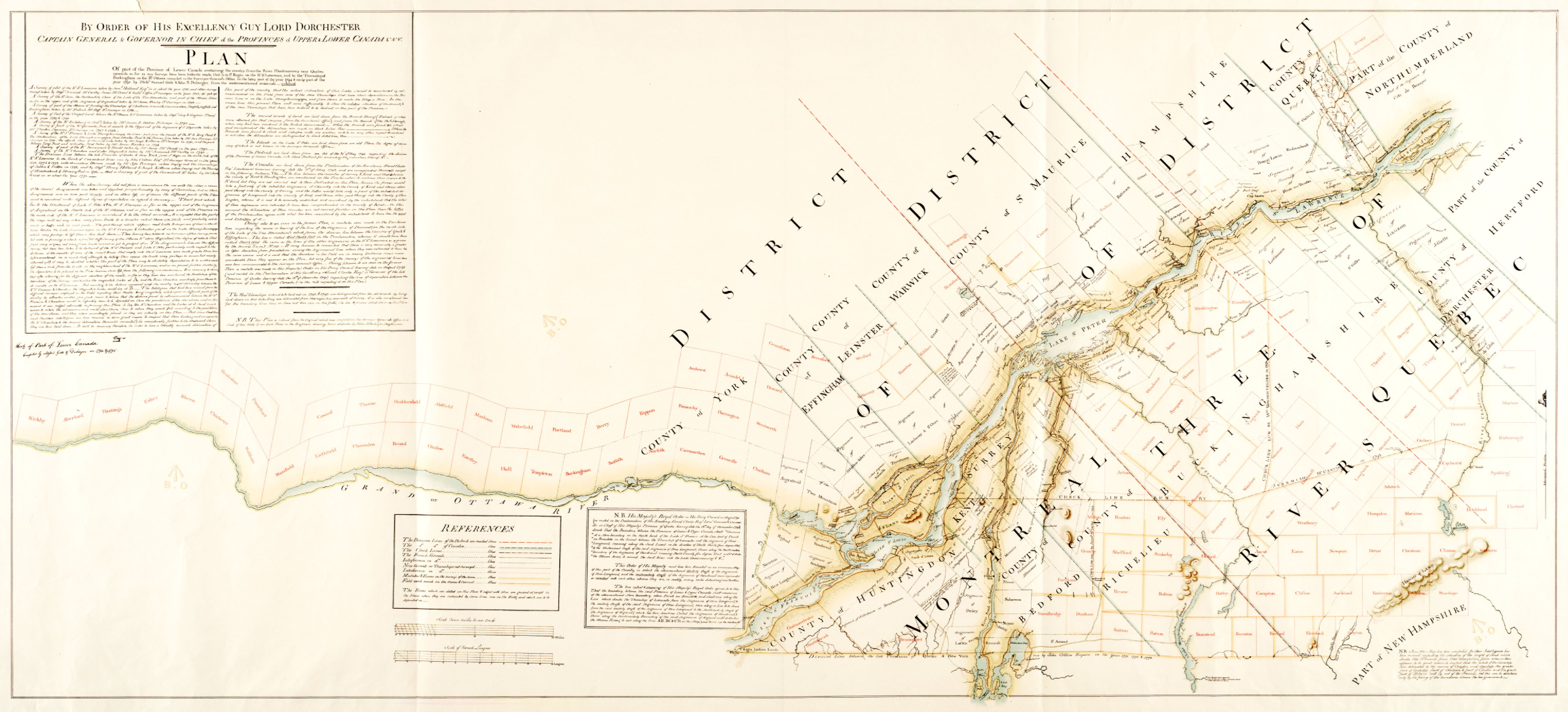
- Montreal District was the westernmost of three districts
- Established: ~1642 (as French district); 1760 (as British district only)
- Dissolved: 1760 (as French district); 1791 (as British district only)

Montreal District was a colonial district in New France and British North America with its capital in Montreal. A descendant of the district exists today as the judicial district of Montreal. Western parts transferred to Upper Canada, later as Canada West, and are now in Ontario, whereas the northeast parts became Labrador and are now within Newfoundland and Labrador.

== History ==
The district was created as a district of Canada, New France.

When the British conquered Canada in 1760, the district of Montreal remained the same as that under the former French regime (see Pays d'en Haut). Under British administration, it was one of three division of the former Province of Quebec from 1763 to 1791. Reapportioned in 1763, it included much of modern-day Quebec, Labrador and most of southern Ontario. The meetings of the District were called the Court of Quarter Sessions of the Peace.

In 1788 western sections Montreal District became:

- Nassau District - after 1792 as Home District
- Hesse District - after 1792 as Western District
- Mecklenburg District - after 1792 as Midland District
- Lunenburg District - after 1792 as Eastern District

These four were then organized as the Province of Upper Canada in 1791 and all dissolved in 1849 when they were replaced with counties.

In 1791 Montreal District was dissolved into 27 new districts in the new province of Lower Canada. Labrador was part of British Quebec after 1774 and part of Lower Canada until 1809 to become part of the Newfoundland Colony in name but not until a border dispute was settled in 1927.

== Other districts ==
Besides Montreal, the British Province of Quebec had two other districts:

- Quebec District - reapportioned in 1763 and covered areas outside of Montreal, the district previously existed under the French regime into British rule. This included most of Labrador, Gaspe Peninsula and Anticosti Island, but not District of Ungava (created officially in 1895 but had existed prior as part of Rupert's Land 1670-1875).
- Trois-Rivières District - recreated in 1790 from Quebec District, a prior district under the French regime existed into British rule.
