= Charles Bochus =

Upper Canada politician

Charles Bochus (December 30, 1802 – January 10, 1878) was a merchant and political figure. He represented Prince Edward in the Legislative Assembly of Upper Canada from 1836 to 1841 as a Conservative member.

He was a captain in the militia and lived in Picton. He died there at the age of 75.
