= Hiram Norton =

Upper Canada politician (c. 1799 – 1875)

Hiram Norton (c. 1799 – 1875) was a merchant and political figure in Upper Canada.

He was born in Vermont around 1799 and settled in Prescott, Ontario. In 1833, he became a justice of the peace in the Johnstown District. He represented Grenville in the Legislative Assembly of Upper Canada from 1831 to 1838 as a Reformer. During the 1830s, he operated a stage coach between Montreal and Toronto with Barnabas Dickinson, the father of Moss Kent Dickinson. At the time of the Upper Canada Rebellion, he left Upper Canada and settled in Lockport, Illinois. Norton became an important industrialist, operating a water-powered flour mill drawing power from the Illinois and Michigan Canal. He died in Lockport in 1875.
