= George Elliott (Canadian politician) =

Upper Canada politician

George Elliott (died July 1844) was an Irish-born farmer and political figure in Upper Canada.He represented Durham in the Legislative Assembly of Upper Canada from 1836 to 1841 as a Conservative.

Elliott lived in Monaghan Township. He was a captain and then major in the Durham militia and also served as a justice of the peace for the Newcastle District. Elliott was an Anglican. He died in Monghan Township.
