= Dalhousie District =

Historic district in Upper Canada

- Historic district
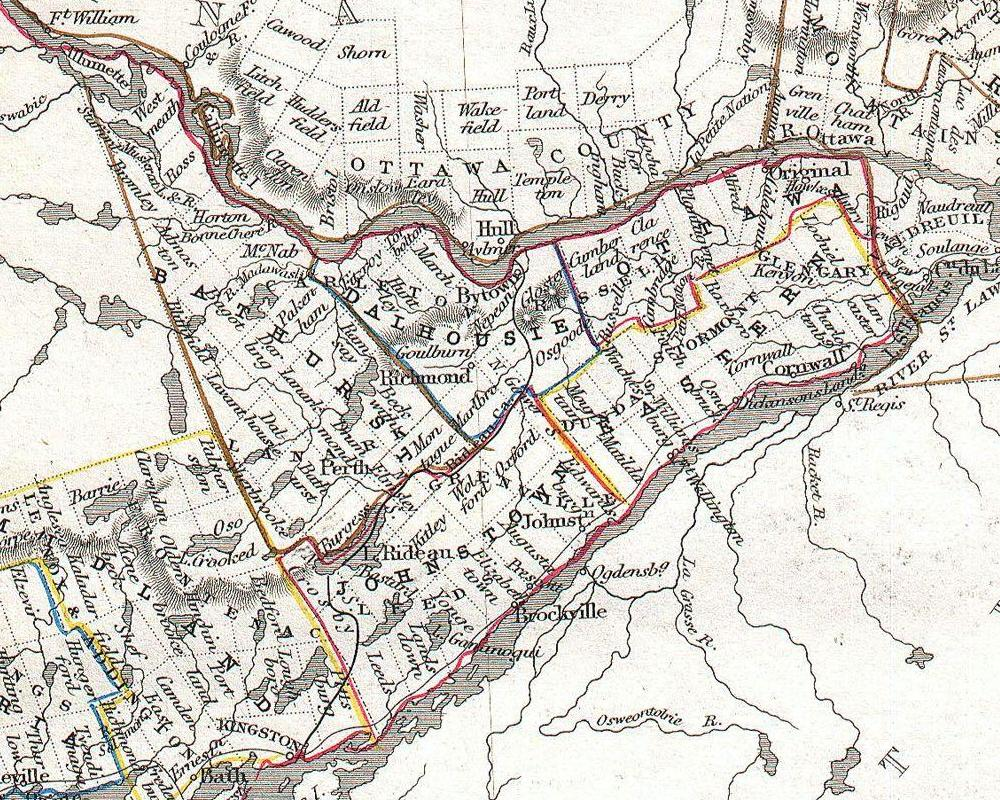
- 1850 map of Eastern Ontario showing the Dalhousie District
- Interactive map of Dalhousie District
- Coordinates: 45°10′N 75°45′W
- Country: Canada
- Created: 1838
- Abolished: 1849
- District town: Bytown, later Ottawa

The Dalhousie District was a historic district in Upper Canada which existed until 1849. It was created in 1838 from Carleton County in the Bathurst District. Townships from the Johnstown and Ottawa districts were added to Carleton County at the same time.

The district town was Bytown, later Ottawa.

In 1849, the district was replaced by Carleton County.
