= Charles Wickens =

Upper Canada politician

Charles Wickens (1776 – May 20, 1847) was an English-born farmer, miller and political figure in Upper Canada. He represented Simcoe in the Legislative Assembly of Upper Canada from 1836 to 1841 as a Conservative. His name also appears as James Wickens in some sources.

Wickens served as a lieutenant for the Royal Waggon Train, later retiring on half-pay. He settled at Penatanguishene, later settling in Vespra Township. He was a justice of the peace for the Home District.
