= Gabrielle Diana =

Canadian transgender activist (born 1999)

Gabrielle Diana Gladu
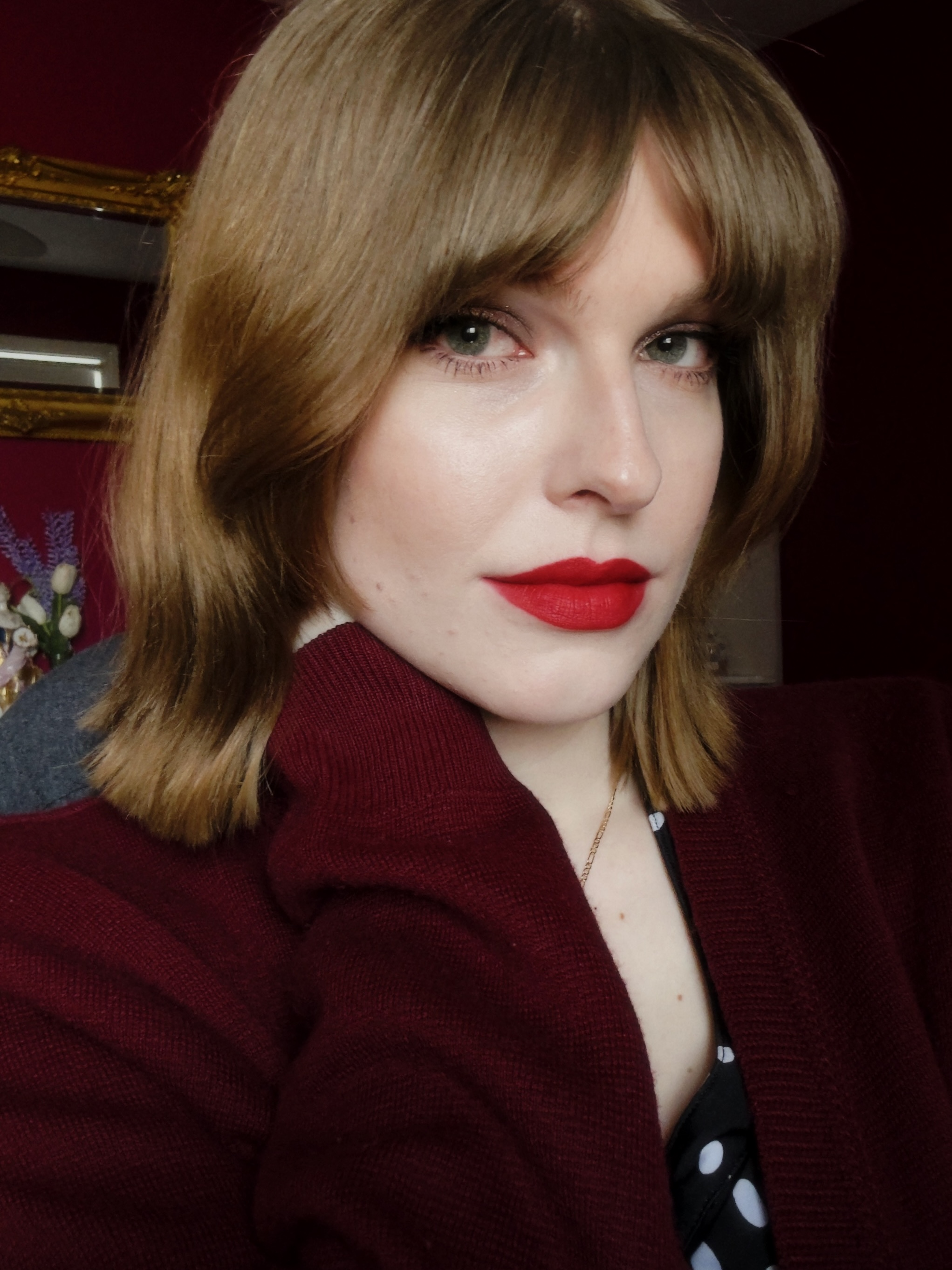
- Gabrielle Diana Gladu in April, 2025.
- Born: February 28, 1999 (age 27); Ottawa, Ontario, Canada
- Other names: Miss Gabby Legend, Gabrielle Diana, Miss Gabby La Diva
- Education: Algonquin College of Applied Arts and Technology, Practical Nursing
- Occupations: Influencer, Singer/Songwriter, Producer, Vocalist, Transgender Advocate
- Years active: 2013–2022 2026-Present
- Known for: Advocacy, Social Media Influencer, Music, Podcast
- Movement: MomentsInTransition

Gabrielle Diana Gladu (born 1999), also known as Miss Gabby, is a Canadian social media influencer and transgender rights activist. She gained popularity when she publicized her gender transition from the age of 14–18. She had been an active presence on Instagram, Twitter, YouTube, and TikTok, leading to her being noted as an important figure for early social media influencing in the trans community . She has since focused less on her transition, focusing more on other priorities.

Gladu left social media from 2022-2026, removing her videos and content from social media platforms, citing health issues and pursuing an education in nursing.

Gladu is diagnosed with generalized epilepsy and revealed that her seizures started to become quite bad in 2023, and she has since become resistant to multiple medical interventions; therefore, her healthcare team began exploring surgical interventions.

She is hosts a Podcast titled This Is Life Babes with co-host and musician/producer MAGDA. The focus is blending their love of pop culture, music, transgender discussions, and politics. Their first episode featured musician That Kid.

== Advocacy ==
Gladu began using her social media platforms to promote recognition and visibility for the trans community from the age of 14, including by documenting aspects of her transition as a teenager. In 2015, The Advocate named her one of "25 Trans Pioneers Who Took Us Past The Tipping Point." Gladu also contributed an essay to MTV News titled "What I Want You To Know During Transgender Awareness Week" that was published on November 20, 2015.

At age 16, Gladu contributed two articles to the online magazine Queer Voices. Writing for ATTN:, author Kyle Fitzpatrick stated Gladu is a teen who embodies America's "new queerness", even though she is international and not based in the United States.

In 2016, at age 17, Gladu was credited with the #MomentsInTransition hashtag trend on Twitter and Instagram after posting photos documenting her own transition. According to Cosmopolitan magazine, "it's grown into a really beautiful collection of pictures and celebration for transgender people."

In March 2019, Gladu received public attention after a dispute on Twitter with singer/songwriter Azealia Banks. The dispute included public and DM messages between Gladu and Banks about the role of transgender and cis women in society. Banks claimed that cis women are being erased by trans women, which Gladu disputed. After the conflict, Out published commentary by Rose Dommu titled "Azealia Banks isn't a Queer Ally-- She is a Bully!"

Gladu was very active on Instagram and Twitter during 2020–2021 with less focus on her gender transition.

Regarding transgender advocacy in the future, Gladu has stated "And I know I’ve been shy talking about my transition over the last couple years, but that’s because transitioning was only a 4 year chapter for me. On the podcast, Magda and I will be able to talk about these issues as grown women and proud trans women"

== Personal life ==
=== Early life and education ===
Gladu was raised in Ottawa, Ontario, in an "extremely conservative community". Her mother is Polish, and her father is Irish and French-Canadian. In 2015, she left Catholicism and studied Buddhism, but has since stated she is a practicing Roman Catholic again. She attended a parochial school and then chose to attend a public school due to a concern about whether her transition would be as accommodated and welcomed. In 2025, Gladu stated, "I don’t follow anything in particular, but I was raised Roman Catholic, so it’s all I’ve ever known, and it’s what feels like home." .

In 2013, Gladu started Grade 9 at Merivale High School in Ottawa, Ontario. In 2017, she graduated with honours. In 2023, Gladu started the Practical Nursing program at Algonquin College in Ottawa, Ontario and graduated from the program in 2025.

=== Transition ===
Gladu has written on her social media that she "used to wear my mom's dresses and makeup, and it wasn't easy in the beginning since I wasn't transitioning".

Gladu attempted suicide on December 12, 2012. Though not yet out as trans, the suicide attempt was related to her gender identity and confusion surrounding her female identity that she had yet to explore. Gladu said, "I was very, very confused. I knew something was different about me. I was so afraid of what people would think of me." Cleis Abeni of The Advocate writes Gladu then received intensive therapy and 'began to reorganize everything in her life around accepting her identity."

Gladu came out as trans during her freshman year in high school; The New York Times writes that "she asked everyone to call her Belle, a shortened version of Gabrielle, and to use female pronouns" and that she began "documenting her transition online in a series of popular YouTube videos." The New York Times also writes, "Support flowed in, giving her the courage to continue, and she began her medical transition in the new year."

On September 27, 2015, Gladu received the message that her name had been legally changed to Gabrielle Diana Gladu. Gladu uploaded a video to her Twitter, which was filmed by her cousin. Gladu's mother surprised her with a cake that revealed that her name was legally changed, which received attention from People magazine, MTV News, BuzzFeed, and NewNowNext. Cleis Abeni of The Advocate also noted the viral video, and commented, "In the lore of trans lives, public and government acceptance of personal choices for naming stands near the top of the proverbial affirmation pyramid." Buzzfeed quotes Gladu stating, "I hope when people see this video, they see the importance of names and pronouns, because they are so important to someone's transition" [...] "It makes them feel valued and important, and that makes transitioning a lot easier."

At age 18, Gladu had Gender Reassignment Surgery in Montreal, and the surgery was performed by Dr. Brassard. She published a video documenting the travelling and pre-/post-op recovery process. Gladu added an age-restricted version of the video, which showed the nurse removing the dressing and packing of her vagina, only a couple of days post-op.

=== Health Issues ===
Gladu revealed that she was diagnosed with epilepsy in 2019. She has stated that one of her seizures resulted in a trimalleolar fracture that required surgical intervention. Gladu also has stated that she has injured herself during seizures frequently and lost several aspects of her social life. Gabrielle has revealed that she practices full sobriety to manage her epilepsy and mental health.

=== Music ===
Gladu is a credited songwriter, vocalist, and producer who has released music with her collaborator Amina under the names BELLEAMINA and Boyshaveasystem. In 2016, they released the collaboration Slimming Tea as Amina's lead single from the Miss Eviction - EP.

In 2025, Gladu revealed in a lengthy post on her YouTube that in 2027, BELLEAMINA will be releasing their debut project, the Perfume Princess - EP. Gladu stated that the EP will have influences of Nu-disco, Synth-pop, and R&B. The project will have approximately 3-5 tracks.
