= James Morris (Canada West politician) =

Businessman and politician, Province of Canada (1798-1865)

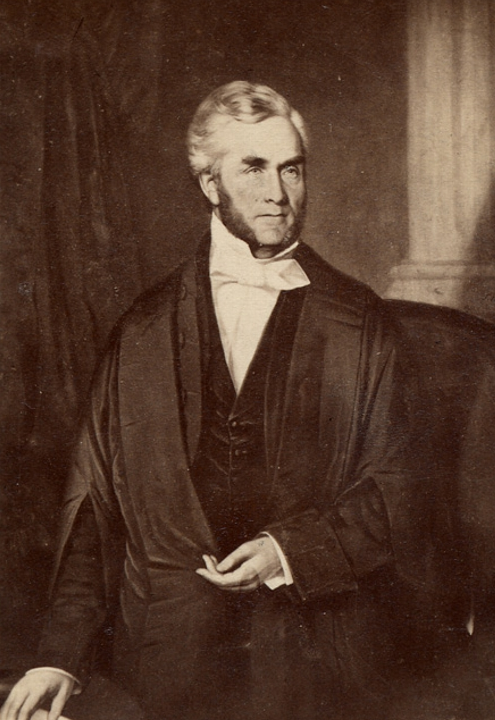

Member of the Legislative Assembly of Upper Canada for Leeds County
- In office 1837–1841
- Monarch: Victoria
- Lieutenant Governor: Sir Francis Bond Head (1836–1838); Sir George Arthur (1838–1840)
- Succeeded by: Position abolished

Member of the Legislative Assembly of the Province of Canada for Leeds
- In office 1841–1844
- Governors General: Lord Sydenham (1841); Sir Charles Bagot (1842–1843); Sir Charles Metcalfe (1843–1845)
- Preceded by: New position

Member of the Legislative Council of the Province of Canada
- In office 1844–1865

Speaker of the Legislative Council
- In office 1853 – 1854, 1858

Postmaster General for the Province of Canada
- In office 1851–1853
- Preceded by: New position
- Succeeded by: Malcolm Cameron

Receiver-General
- In office 1862–1863

Personal details
- Born: November 1, 1798 Paisley, Renfrewshire, Scotland
- Died: September 9, 1865 (aged 66) Brockville, Canada West
- Party: Reform
- Relatives: William Morris (brother); Edmund Murney (brother-in-law)
- Occupation: Business and banking

Military service
- Allegiance: Upper Canada
- Branch/service: Canadian militia
- Years of service: 1822-1850
- Rank: Lieutenant; Lieutenant-Colonel
- Unit: 2nd Carleton Militia (1821-28)
- Commands: 3rd Leeds Light Infantry (1828-37); Brockville Embodied Militia (1838); 1st Leeds Militia (1846-50)
- Battles/wars: Rebellions of 1837–1838: Defence of Brockville

James Morris (November 1, 1798 – September 23, 1865) was a businessman, banker and political figure in Canada West. He was a member of the Legislative Assembly of the Province of Canada as a Reformer. He was later a member of the Legislative Council, serving as the Speaker of the Legislative Council. He was also a member of the Executive Council of the province.

== Family and early life ==
Morris was born in Paisley, Renfrewshire, Scotland, in 1798. The family emigrated to British North America, eventually settling with his family at Elizabethtown (later Brockville) in Upper Canada in 1808. He was educated at Sorel in Lower Canada, at a school operated by the father of Wolfred Nelson, who was later one of the leaders of the Lower Canada Rebellion.

Morris married Emily Rosamond Murney of Kingston, the sister of Edmund Murney, who was later elected to the Legislative Assembly for Hastings.

== Business career ==
By 1820, Morris was involved in various business activities with his older brothers, including William Morris, who would also be involved in politics. He was active in banking throughout his career. By 1836, he was the cashier at the Commercial Bank of the Midland District in Brockville. He also formed working relationships with William Hamilton Merritt and Isaac Buchanan, two successful businessmen who would also serve in the Legislative Assembly.

At that time, communications were mainly by boats plying the Saint Lawrence River from Quebec City and Montreal to York on Lake Ontario. However, there were stretches of the Saint Lawrence that had dangerous rapids. Morris became involved in projects to build canals and locks north of the Saint Lawrence, allowing shipping to bypass the dangerous stretches. In 1838, he was appointed to a commission which administered funds raised for canal building. After he was elected to the Legislative Assembly, he was involved in measures to fund canals.

The town of West Williamsburg, which benefited from the canals, changed its name to Morrisburg to recognise his role in the town's development.

Morris was involved in the founding of Queen's College, later Queen's University, at Kingston. He was one of the four original trustees of the university funds.

== Political career ==
Morris was appointed justice of the peace in 1825. He was elected in a by-election to represent Leeds County in the Legislative Assembly of Upper Canada from 1837 to 1840. He stated that he was a conservative, wishing to maintain the British connection. Following the merger of Upper Canada and Lower Canada in 1841, he again represented Leeds in the first Legislative Assembly of the Province of Canada from 1841 to 1844.

Morris was a consistent vote for Reform. In the first session of the first Parliament, he joined most of the moderate Reformers in voting in support of the union of the Canadas, but also voted with the more radical Reformers under Robert Baldwin in opposing the government of the Governor General, Lord Sydenham. In subsequent sessions of the first Parliament, he generally voted with Baldwin's group, opposing the positions of the Governors General.

In 1844, he was appointed to the Legislative Council. He was speaker of the Legislative Council from 1853 to 1854 and was appointed again for the Brown-Dorian administration in 1858.

From 1851 to 1854, in 1858, and from 1862 to 1863, Morris was a member of the Executive Council of the Province. In 1851, he became the first Postmaster General for the Province of Canada, serving ex officio on the Board of Railway Commissioners and representing the government on the board of the Grand Trunk Railway. He served as receiver general from 1862 until 1863.

== Military service ==
Throughout his career, Morris held a series of commissions in the Upper Canada Militia. He was appointed a Lieutenant in the 2nd Battalion of Carleton Militia in the Johnstown District on August 20, 1821. In June 1828, he was promoted to Lieutenant-Colonel and took command of the 3rd Leeds Light Infantry.

In November 1838, during the Rebellions of 1837-38, Morris commanded the Brockville Embodied Militia, placed on active service in Brockville on November 20. The Embodied Militia remained on guard in the town until January 1839.

Lt-Col. Morris was appointed to command of the 1st Battalion of Leeds Militia on November 5, 1846.

== Death ==
Morris was forced to retire from political life in 1863, when he suffered a debilitating stroke. He died at Brockville in 1865.
