= John Hamilton (Quebec politician) =

Canadian politician

The Hon. John Hamilton
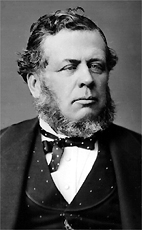

Senator for Inkerman, Quebec
- In office October 23, 1867 – May 1, 1887
- Appointed by: Royal Proclamation
- Succeeded by: John Abbott

Personal details
- Born: 16 December 1827 Hawkesbury, Upper Canada
- Died: 3 April 1888 (aged 60) Montreal, Quebec
- Party: Conservative

John Hamilton (16 December 1827 – 3 April 1888) was one of the founding members of the Senate of Canada.

He was born in Hawkesbury in Upper Canada in 1827, the son of George Hamilton. John and his brothers continued to expand their father's lumber business from its base on the lower Ottawa River. He served as reeve of Hawkesbury from 1858 to 1864. In 1860, he was elected to the Legislative Council of the Province of Canada for the Inkerman division in Canada East. A Conservative, he was appointed to the senate on 23 October 1867 by royal proclamation following the Canadian Confederation of 1867. He served in that capacity, representing the province of Quebec until his resignation on 1 May 1887.

He died in Montreal in 1888.

The Hamilton Memorial Prize was instituted at the University of Trinity College by Hamilton's family in his honour. It is given each year to the Divinity student with the top Honours Thesis.
