= Jack Kearns (footballer) =

English footballer

Personal information
- Full name: John Kearns
- Date of birth: 4 January 1914
- Place of birth: Talke Pits, England
- Date of death: 14 February 1945 (aged 31)
- Place of death: United Kingdom
- Position: Full back

Senior career*
Years	Team	Apps	(Gls)
1935	Downings Tileries		
1937–1938	Millwall	0	(0)
1936–1937	Wolverhampton Wanderers	0	(0)
1938–1939	Tranmere Rovers	22	(1)
- * Club domestic league appearances and goals

John Kearns (4 January 1914 – 14 February 1945) was an English professional footballer who played as a full back in the Football League for Tranmere Rovers.

== Personal life ==
Kearns was married and served as a bombardier in the Royal Artillery during the Second World War. He died on active service on 14 February 1945 and is buried at South Shoebury (St. Andrew) Churchyard, Essex. He left a widow, Betty.

== Career statistics ==
Appearances and goals by club, season and competition
Club	Season	League			FA Cup		Total	
Club	Season	Division	Apps	Goals	Apps	Goals	Apps	Goals
Tranmere Rovers	1938–39	Second Division	21	1	1	0	22	1
Career total			21	1	1	0	22	1
