= Roger Rollo Hunter =

Upper Canada politician

Roger Rollo Hunter was a Scottish-born farmer and political figure in Upper Canada. He represented Oxford in the Legislative Assembly of Upper Canada from 1839 to 1841.

He lived in Blandford Township. Hunter was a lieutenant in the East Indian Artillery. He served in the Oxford militia, reaching the rank of lieutenant-colonel. Hunter was a justice of the peace for the London District and then for the Brock District. He was elected to the assembly in an 1839 by-election held after Charles Duncombe left the country following the Upper Canada Rebellion.
