= Eastern District, Upper Canada =

Coordinates: 45°10′N 74°57′W

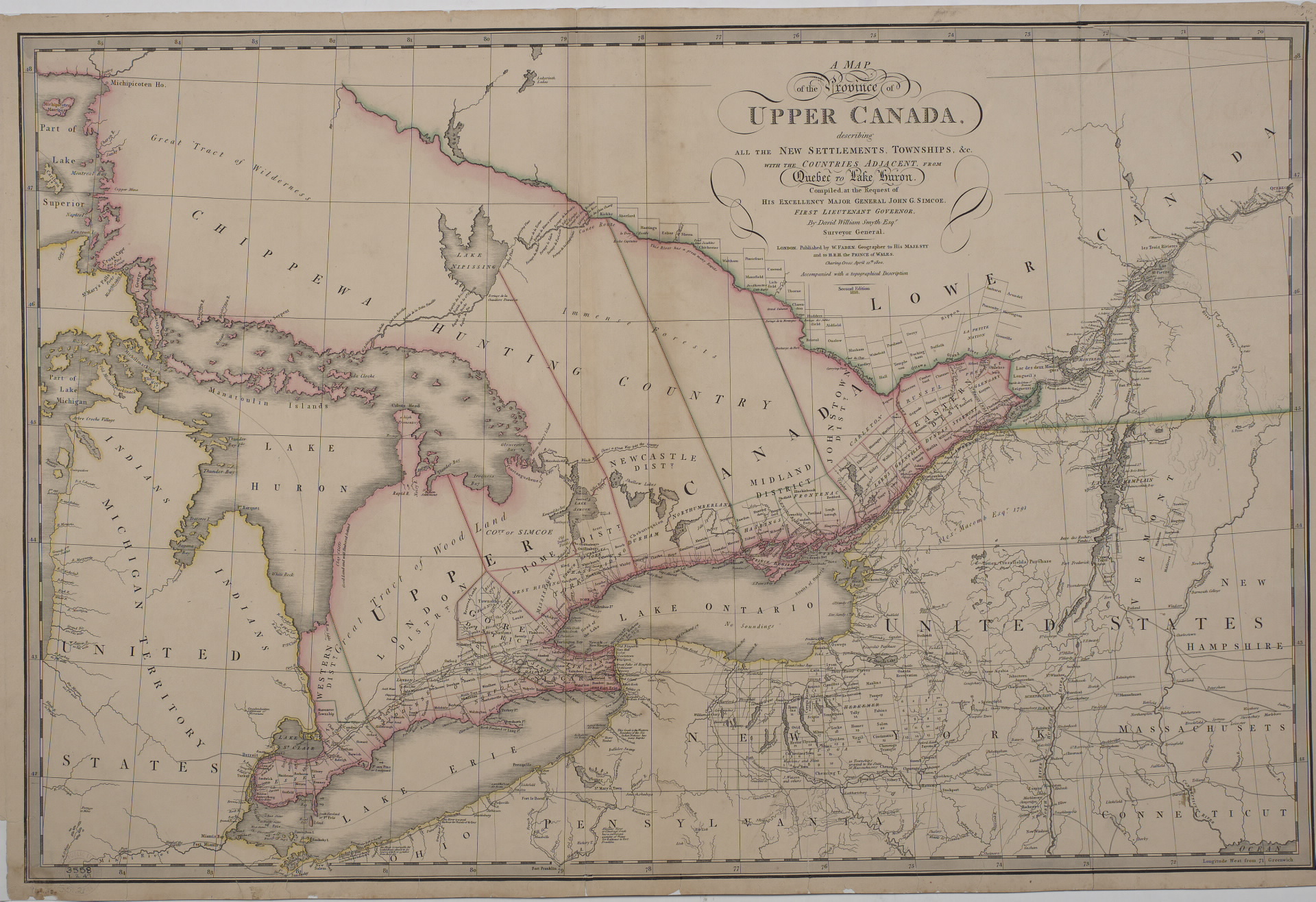
1818 map of Ontario showing the original Eastern District

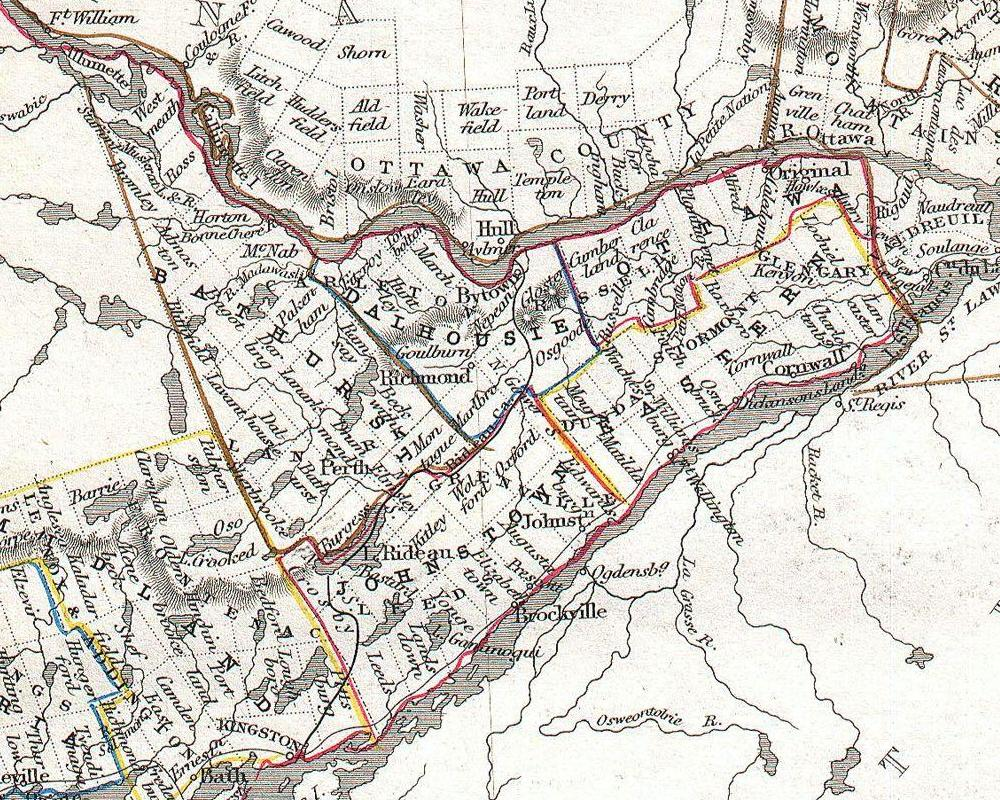
1850 map of Eastern Ontario showing Eastern District

Eastern District was one of four districts of the Province of Quebec created in 1788 in the western reaches of the Montreal District and partitioned in 1791 to create the new colony of Upper Canada.

== Historical evolution ==
The District, originally known as Lunenburg District (after Lüneburg in Germany), was constituted in 1788 in the Province of Quebec, and was described as:

... bounded on the east by the eastern limit of tract lately called or known by the name of Lancaster, protracted northerly and southerly as far as our said province extends, and bounded westerly by a north and south line, intersecting the mouth of the river Gananoque, now called the Thames, above the rifts of the Saint Lawrence, and extending southerly and northerly to the limits of our said province, therein comprehending the several towns or tracts called or known by the names of Lancaster, Charlottenburg, Cornwall, Osnabruck, Williamsburg, Matilda, Edwardsburg, Augusta and Elizabethtown...

The District was renamed as "Eastern District" in 1792, and its jail and courthouse were established in New Johnstown.

In 1798, the new Parliament of Upper Canada divided the District in two, which went into force in January 1800, and the new Districts consisted of the following electoral counties:

Reorganization of the Luneburg District (1800)
Eastern District	Johnstown District
Dundas; Glengarry; Prescott; Russell; Stormont	Carleton; Grenville; Leeds

In 1816, Prescott and Russell were removed from the District, to form the new Ottawa District.

At the beginning of 1850, the district was abolished and replaced by the United Counties of Stormont, Dundas and Glengarry for municipal and judicial purposes.

== See also ==
- Cornwall Collegiate and Vocational School - founded 1806 as Cornwall Grammar School and Eastern District Grammar School 1807
