= Carleton County, Ontario =

Former county in Ontario, Canada

Coordinates: 45°10′N 75°45′W

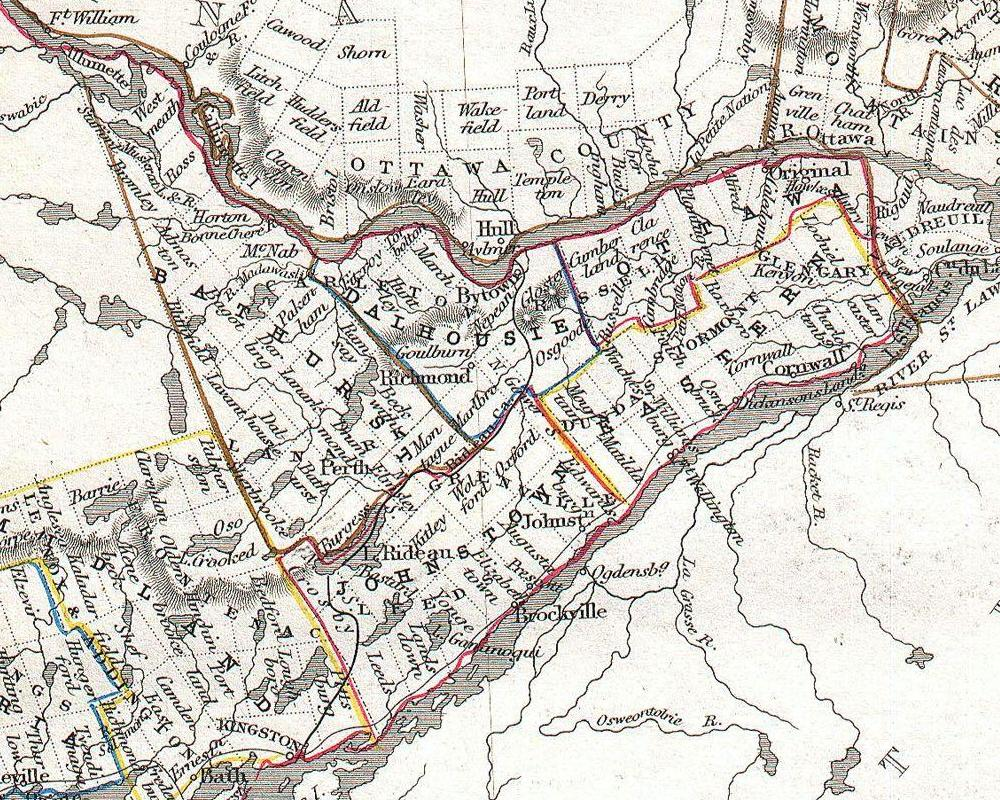
1850 map of Eastern Ontario showing Dalhousie District, having boundaries congruent with Carleton County

Carleton County is the name of a former county in Ontario, Canada. In 1969, it was superseded by the Regional Municipality of Ottawa–Carleton. In 2001, the Regional Municipality and its eleven local municipalities (including Ottawa) were replaced by the current city of Ottawa.

== History ==
Upon the creation of the Johnston District in 1800, Carleton County, named after Guy Carleton, 1st Baron Dorchester, was created from portions of Dundas and Grenville counties, comprising the following territory:

... the township of Nepean, with the tract of land to be hereafter laid out into townships, between Nepean and a line drawn north fifteen degrees from the north-west angle of the township of Crosby, until it intersects the Ottawa River, with such of the islands in the said river as are wholly, or in greater part opposite thereto...

In 1824, upon the creation of Bathurst District (with its judicial seat at Perth), Carleton was withdrawn from Johnstown District and divided into two counties, so that its constituent townships were distributed as follows:

Counties comprising Bathurst District (1824)
Carleton	Lanark
Nepean; Goulbourne; Huntley; March; Pakenham; Fitzroy; Torbolton; together with such Islands in the Ottawa River as are wholly or in greater part opposite thereto	Bathurst; Drummond; Beckwith; Dalhousie; Lanark; Ramsay; Darling; Levant; North Sherbrooke; South Sherbrooke; together with all the unsurveyed lands within the District of Bathurst, and such Islands in the Ottawa River as are wholly or in greater part opposite to the said townships and unsurveyed land

In 1838, Carleton was withdrawn from Bathurst District to form Dalhousie District, its judicial seat at Bytown, with the following territorial adjustments:

1. Pakenham township was transferred to the new Renfrew County
2. North Gower and Marlborough townships were added from Johnstown District
3. Gloucester and Osgoode townships were added from Ottawa District

Effective January 1, 1850, as a consequence of the passage of the Baldwin Act, Dalhousie District was abolished, and Carleton replaced it for municipal and judicial purposes. It consisted of the following townships:

Townships comprising Carleton County (1824)
Township	Area	Opened	Settled	Incorporated	Principal settlements	Description
Fitzroy	60,518 acres (94.6 sq mi; 244.9 km^{2})	1823			Galetta, Mohr Corners, Fitzroy Harbour, Kinburn, Antrim, Marathon, Panmure	Surveyed in 1821. It was named in honour of Sir Charles Augustus Fitzroy, soldier and Governor of New South Wales, who married Lady Mary Lennox, daughter of Charles Lennox, 4th Duke of Richmond.
Gloucester	84,267 acres (131.7 sq mi; 341.0 km^{2})	1798		1850	South Gloucester, Blackburn Hamlet, Orleans	Named after Prince William Frederick, second Duke of Gloucester.
Goulbourn	65,447 acres (102.3 sq mi; 264.9 km^{2})		1818		Stittsville, Munster, Richmond	Settled by veterans of the 99th and 100th Regiments of the line disbanded at Quebec who established headquarters at Richmond. Township was named after Henry Goulburn, Undersecretary of State for War and the Colonies from 1812 to 1826.
Huntley	62,616 acres (97.8 sq mi; 253.4 km^{2})	1823			Huntley, Carp, Corkery, Powell	Named after Huntly Castle, associated with Charlotte Lennox, wife of the Duke of Richmond.
March	26,157 acres (40.9 sq mi; 105.9 km^{2})	1823			Dunrobin, Marchhurst, South March	Named in honour of the Duke of Richmond, who held the subsidiary title of Earl of March.
Marlborough	56,817 acres (88.8 sq mi; 229.9 km^{2})	1798		1850	Malakoff, Bridgeview and Dwyer Hill	Named after John Churchill, 1st Duke of Marlborough.
Nepean	55,496 acres (86.7 sq mi; 224.6 km^{2})	1798	1810		Ottawa, Jockvale, Fallowfield, Bell's Corners	First settled by Ira Honeywell, son of Rice Honeywell of Prescott. Named in honour of Sir Evan Nepean, British Under-Secretary of State for the Home Department from 1782 to 1791.
North Gower	36,610 acres (57.2 sq mi; 148.2 km^{2})				North Gower, Kars, Manotick	Named after Admiral John Leveson-Gower, Lord of the Admiralty from 1783 to 1789.
Osgoode	91,342 acres (142.7 sq mi; 369.6 km^{2})	1798	1826	1850	Osgoode, Metcalfe	Named after William Osgoode, the first Chief Justice of Upper Canada.
Torbolton	25,812 acres (40.3 sq mi; 104.5 km^{2})	1823			Torbolton, Dirleton, Kilmaurs, Woodlawn	Named after the village of Torbolton in Ayrshire, Scotland. Lord Torbolton was one of the subsidiary titles of the Duke of Richmond.

=== Chronology ===
- Also in 1850, all of the townships of Carleton County were incorporated (see list above). Bytown was incorporated as a town, and Richmond became a village.
- In 1855 Bytown was renamed Ottawa and became a city.
- In 1867 New Edinburgh was incorporated as a village and 20 years later was annexed by Ottawa.
- In 1888 Ottawa East was incorporated as a village and would later be annexed by Ottawa.
- In 1893 Hintonburg was incorporated as a village. It would be annexed 14 years later by Ottawa.
- In 1898 Metcalfe was incorporated as a police village.
- In 1903 Manotick was incorporated as a police village.
- In 1905 Rideauville, Westboro and North Gower were incorporated as police villages. Rideauville was annexed by Ottawa two years later, and Westboro was annexed in 1949.
- In 1908 Rockcliffe Park was incorporated as a police village, while Janeville was incorporated as a village. Janeville would be incorporated as a town in 1913 as the Town of Eastview, while Rockcliffe Park became a full village in 1925.
- In 1910 Kenmore and Osgoode Station were incorporated as police villages.
- In 1912 Ottawa West was incorporated as a police village and would be annexed by Ottawa in 1949.
- In 1922 Overbrook and St. Joseph d'Orleans were incorporated as police villages. Overbrook was annexed by Ottawa in 1950.
- In 1939 Hampton Park was incorporated as a police village. It would be annexed by Ottawa ten years later.
- In 1955 City View was incorporated as a police village.
- In 1956 Stittsville was incorporated as a police village. Five years later Stittsville became a full village.
- In 1963 Eastview (now Vanier) became a city.
- In June 1968, the County, together with Ottawa and the Township of Cumberland that was withdrawn from Russell County, became the Regional Municipality of Ottawa-Carleton.

== See also ==
- List of townships in Ontario
