= George Hamilton (lumber baron) =

George Hamilton (April 13, 1781 – January 7, 1839) was a lumber baron and public official in Upper Canada.

== Ireland ==
In 1781, George Hamilton was born at Hamwood House, in County Meath, Ireland. He was the third son of Charles Hamilton (d. 1818), who built Hamwood, and his wife Elizabeth, daughter of Crewe Chetwood of Woodbrook, Queen's County. His family were descended from James Hamilton of Finnart and had come to Ireland during the reign of James VI and I in the Plantations of Ireland. He was a nephew of Hugh Hamilton, Bishop of Ossory, and his first cousin, George Hamilton of Hampton Hall, County Dublin (a priest), was the father of George Alexander Hamilton.

== Quebec ==
Hamilton came to Quebec City sometime before 1807. He and his brother William were merchants importing Madeira wine and selling other goods. In 1809, they set themselves up in the timber trade in Lower Canada, exporting lumber and supplying shipbuilders. As a result of a timber operator being unable to honour his contract, they became owners of a mill at Hawkesbury, Ontario associated with lumbering along the Rideau River. During the War of 1812, George served in the Quebec militia reaching the rank of major. When his brother retired, he moved to Hawkesbury to look after the mill. In 1816, Hamilton became a Justice of the Peace and judge in the new Ottawa District Court of Upper Canada. During the 1820s, a downturn in the timber trade resulted in hard times for the Hamilton family and the business teetered on the edge of bankruptcy.

In 1830, Hamilton formed a partnership with Charles Adamson Low. The mill at Hawkesbury grew to become one of the top producers in the country. Although Hamilton had resorted to illegal cutting on crown lands when establishing his business, he now began to lobby the government to introduce a system of licenses to control timber cutting on crown land. A fee-based system was introduced and, at Bytown, a down payment was collected against future cutting fees which favoured the wealthier operators and discouraged speculation.

In the valley of the Gatineau River, Hamilton helped establish the so-called Gatineau Privilege, established by an order-in-council in November 1832 which limited the number of operators in the region. Despite protests, it remained in effect until 1843. Hamilton and Low had a similar arrangement in the valley of the Rouge River.

== Family ==
At Quebec, Hamilton married Susannah Christina "Lucy" Craigie, daughter of John Craigie and Susannah Coffin, daughter of John Coffin (1729–1808) of Quebec and a first cousin of admiral Isaac Coffin. Lucy Hamilton was a niece of Margaret Coffin Sheaffe (wife of Roger Hale Sheaffe) and a half-sister of the wife of Benjamin Joseph Frobisher. In 1822 or 1823, while Hamilton and his family were descending the Ottawa River to Montreal, their canoe overturned in rapids and their three young children drowned. Hamilton died of a severe cold at Hawkesbury after a trip to review militia in the 1837–38 rebellions. He was survived by at least six children:

- Robert Hamilton (1822–1898), continued the family's timber trade. He married Isabella, daughter of John Thomson of Quebec; parents of John Hamilton.
- George Hamilton (1824–1856), married Julia, daughter of Judge George Stephen Benjamin Jarvis. They were the parents of George Wellesley Hamilton.
- John Hamilton, senator, President of Sir Hugh Allan's Merchants Bank of Canada, Montreal.
- Henrietta Hamilton (1830–1857), married Andrew Thomson (1829–1907), President of the Union Bank of Canada and the Quebec Railway, Light, Heat & Power Company. Their only son, George Hamilton Thomson, married Hylda Graves Meredith, daughter of Chief Justice William Collis Meredith.
- Charles Hamilton, 1st Anglican Archbishop of Ottawa.
- Francis Hamilton (b. 1838), died unmarried.
