= Russell County, Ontario =

Historic county in Ontario, Canada

Coordinates: 45°25′N 75°10′W

Russell County is known as a historic county in the Canadian province of Ontario.

It was created in 1800 from a portion of Stormont County and named for Peter Russell, former Administrator for Upper Canada.

In 1820, the county was united with Prescott County to form United Counties of Prescott and Russell which is still an upper-tier municipality

The county's Cumberland Township became part of the Regional Municipality of Ottawa–Carleton in 1969, and is now part of the single-tier city of Ottawa.

== Historic townships ==
- Cambridge (SE) - Now part of The Nation Municipality
- Clarence (NE) - Merged with Rockland to become the city of Clarence-Rockland
- Cumberland (NW) - Now part of the City of Ottawa
- Russell Township (SW) - Existing lower-tier municipality.

== See also ==
- List of Ontario census divisions
- List of townships in Ontario
