= Johnstown District, Upper Canada =

Coordinates: 44°45′N 75°28′W

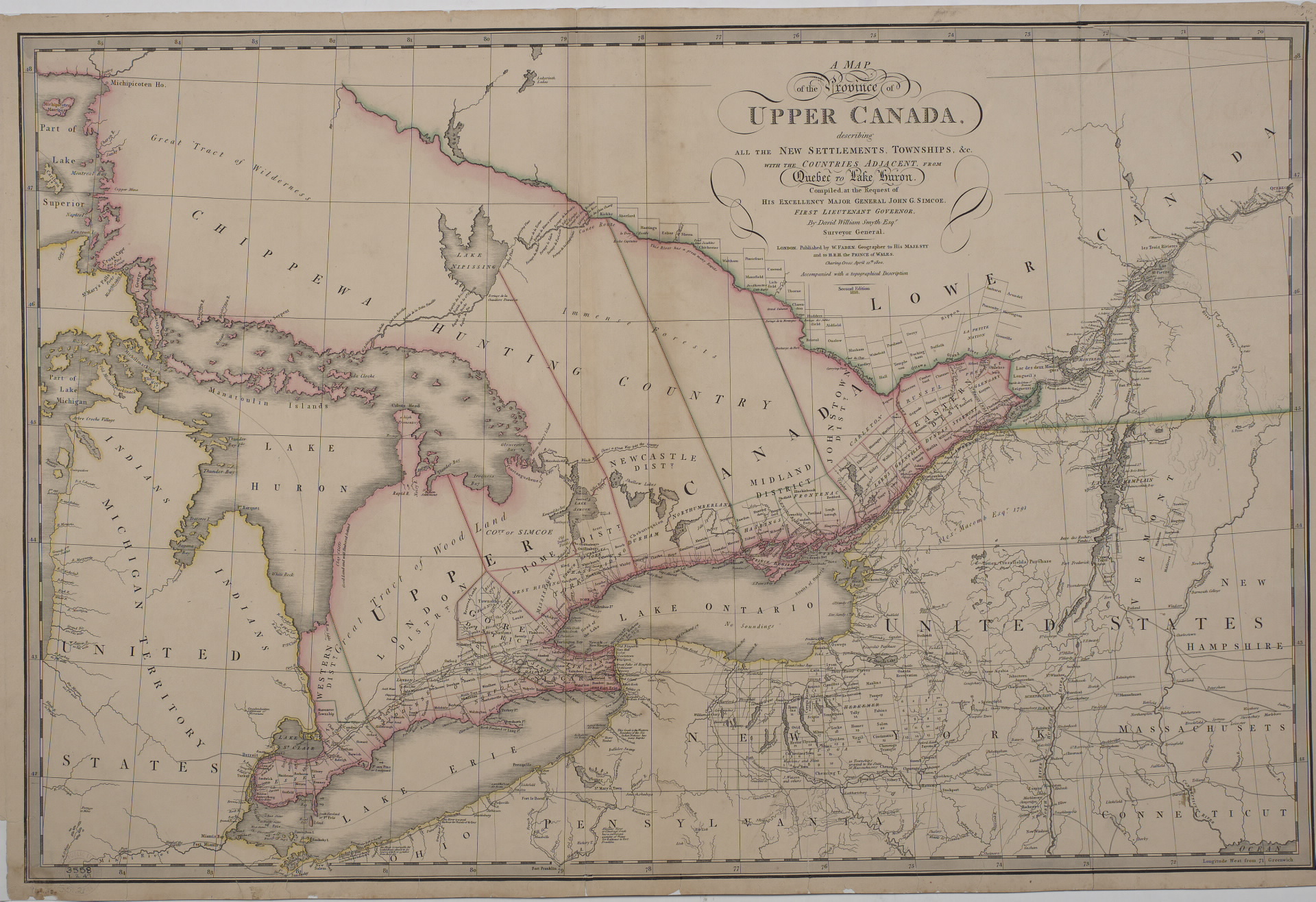
1818 map of Ontario showing the original Johnstown District

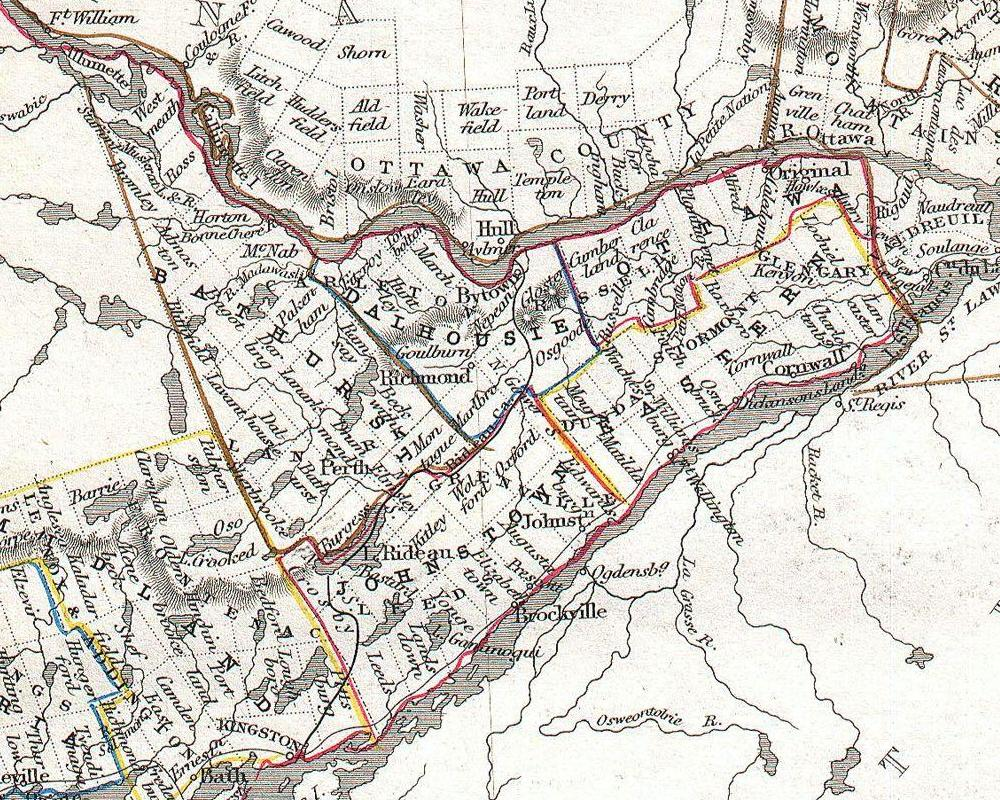
1850 map of Eastern Ontario showing Johnstown District

The Johnstown District was a historic district in Upper Canada which existed until 1849.

== Historical evolution ==
In 1798, the new Parliament of Upper Canada divided the territory of the Eastern District in two, which went into force in January 1800, and the following counties were withdrawn to form the Johnstown District:

Formation of the Johnstown District (1800)
County	Territory
Carleton	the township of Nepean, with the tract of land to be hereafter laid out into townships, between Nepean and a line drawn north fifteen degrees from the north-west angle of the township of Crosby, until it intersects the Ottawa River, with such of the islands in the said river as are wholly, or in greater part opposite thereto
Grenville	the townships of: Edwardsburg; Augusta; Wolford; Oxford on the Rideau; Marlborough; Montague; Gower, called North and South Gower; together with such of the islands in the River Saint Lawrence as are wholly, or in greater part opposite thereto
Leeds	the townships of: Elizabeth-Town; Yonge (including what was formerly called Escot); Landsdowne; Leeds; Crosby; Bastard; Burgess; Elmsley; Kitley; together with such of the islands in the River Saint Lawrence as are wholly, or in greater part opposite thereto

The district town was originally Johnstown, but it was transferred to Elizabethtown in 1808.

The District's territory was subsequently reduced in several steps:

1. In 1822, Carleton County was withdrawn and transferred to the new Bathurst District.
2. In 1838, upon the creation of the new Dalhousie District, the township of North Gower and Marlborough were transferred to Carleton County, and the township of Montague, together with those portions of the townships of Elmsley and Burgess lying north of the Rideau River, were transferred to Lanark County.

Effective January 1, 1850, Johnstown District was abolished, and the United Counties of Leeds and Grenville replaced it for municipal and judicial purposes.
