= Ottawa District =

Coordinates: 45°28′N 74°50′W

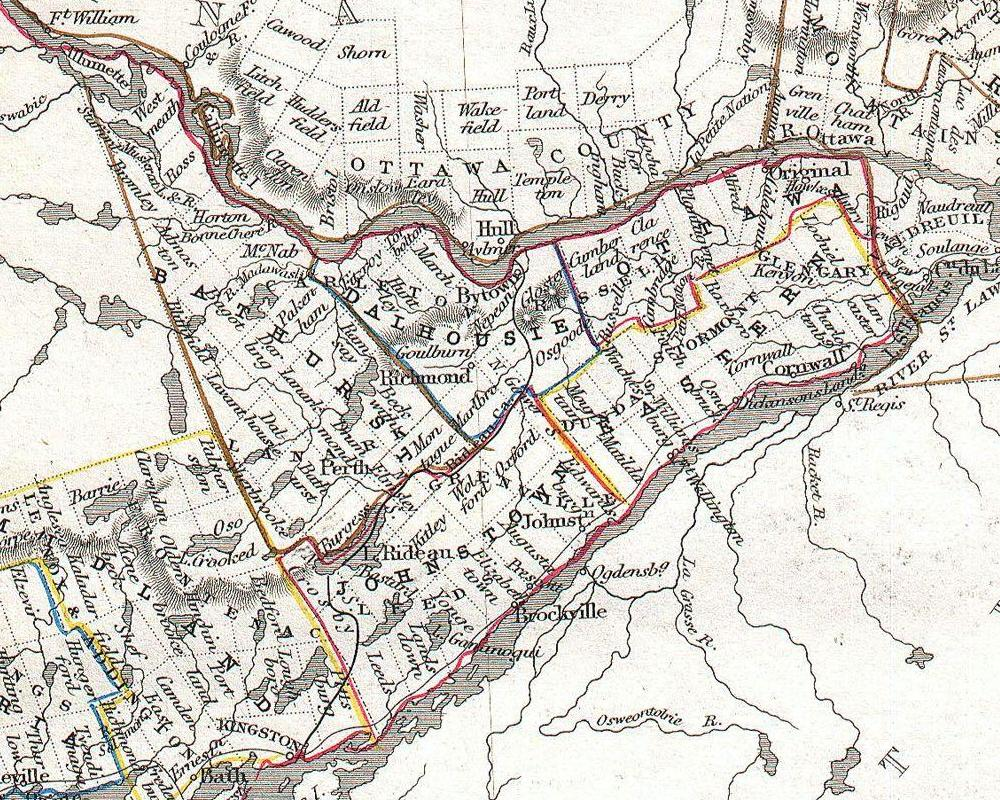
1850 map of Eastern Ontario showing Ottawa District

The Ottawa District was a historic district in Upper Canada which existed until 1849. It was created in 1816 by splitting the counties of Prescott and Russell from the Eastern District. The district town was L'Orignal.

In 1838 Gloucester township from Russell County was transferred to a new Dalhousie District.

In 1849, the district was replaced by the United Counties of Prescott and Russell.
