= Prescott County =

Historic county in Ontario, Canada

Coordinates: 45°30′N 74°45′W

Prescott County is known as a historic county in the Canadian province of Ontario.

It was created in 1800 from a portion of Glengarry County. It was named in honour of Major General Robert Prescott, Governor of Canada at that time. First settlers were Americans, but not all were Loyalists. In 1820, the county was united with Russell County to form United Counties of Prescott and Russell which is still an upper-tier municipality.

== Historic townships ==
- Alfred - Named in memory of Prince Alfred, son of King George III, who died as a child of two-years old. Earliest patent was granted to John McKindlay on August 10, 1801. The Township was later merged with North Plantagenet, now Alfred and Plantagenet Township.
- Caledonia - Earliest patent was to Joshua Hall on April 30, 1808. The township was first part of Longueuil and was organized in 1810. It is now part of The Nation Municipality.
- East Hawkesbury - Still exists today as a lower-tier municipality known as East Hawkesbury Township. Crown patent granted to Hon. W.O. Powell, February 10, 1797, Col. William Fortune, March 10, 1787, and Sir John Johnson, May 16, 1798.
- Longueuil - It was a fief held under the seignorial system of the French regime by the descendants of Charles le Moyne de Longueuil et de Châteauguay. In 1796 the township was purchased by American Nathaniel Hazard Treadwell, who declined to take an oath of loyalty and was deported, in 1812, to the United States. In 1830, he returned and his son Charles Platt Treadwell became sheriff of Prescott and Russell. The Township was later merged with West Hawkesbury, now Champlain Township.
- North Plantagenet - Opened in 1798, first land grant was to Peter Lukin on July 10, 1801. Township was merged with Alfred, now Alfred and Plantagenet Township.
- South Plantagenet - Now part of The Nation Municipality.
- West Hawkesbury - Opened in 1798 it has now been merged with Longueuil, and is now known as Champlain Township.

Source: Province of Ontario -- A History 1615 to 1927 by Jesse Edgar Middletwon & Fred Landon, copyright 1927, Dominion Publishing Company, Toronto

== See also ==
- List of Ontario census divisions
- List of townships in Ontario
