= Rideau-Jock Ward =

Rideau-Jock
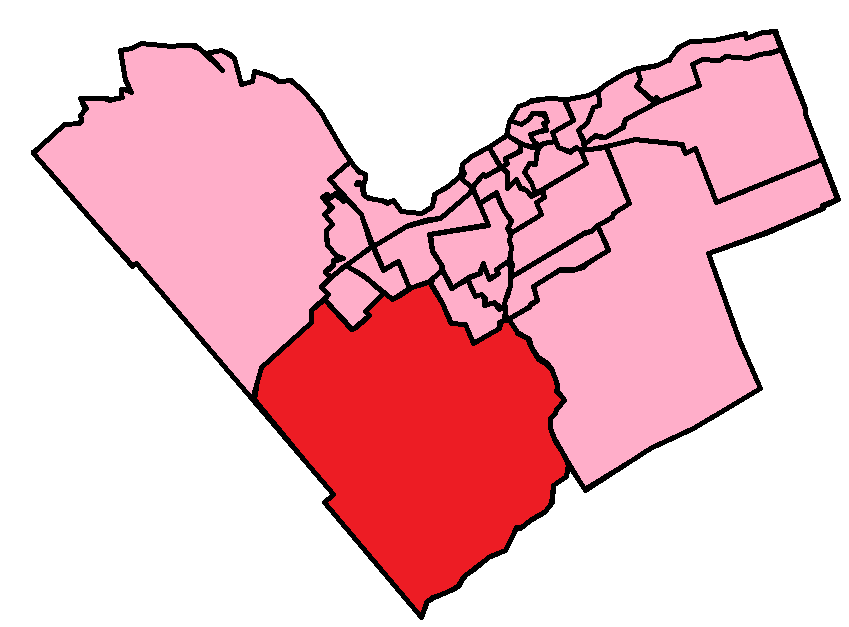
- Location within Ottawa
- Coordinates: 45°06′N 75°47′W
- Country: Canada
- Province: Ontario
- City: Ottawa

Government
  - Councillor: David Brown

Population (2022)
  - Total: 30,864

Languages (2016)
  - English: 88.4%
  - French: 6.6%

Rideau-Jock Ward (Ward 21) is a city ward located in Ottawa, Ontario. Situated in the rural south end of the city, the ward includes rural areas west of the Rideau River and the communities of Manotick, Richmond, North Gower, Munster, Kars, Fallowfield, Ashton and Burritts Rapids as well as the former Goulbourn Township south and west of Stittsville.

== History ==
The ward was created following the area's amalgamation into Ottawa in 2001, and first contested in 2000. Prior to amalgamation, this area was represented on Regional council by Western Townships Ward. Until 2006, the ward was known as Rideau Ward, containing the former Rideau Township. In 2006, the ward increased in size to contain the rural parts of the former Goulbourn Township (excluding Stittsville, which became the new Stittsville Ward), due to population growth in Stittsville. At this time, the ward was re-named Rideau-Goulbourn Ward. In 2014, the new Blackstone subdivision was transferred from Rideau-Goulbourn Ward to Stittsville Ward.

Following the George Floyd protests in 2020, there were calls to re-name this ward due to Goulbourn's namesake, Henry Goulburn's attachment to slavery in the 19th century. The ward name was ultimately changed, with "Goulbourn" being replaced by "Jock", for the Jock River which flows through the former Goulbourn Township.

== Regional councillors ==
Rideau Township formed as an amalgamation of Malborough and North Gower Township in 1974.

1. Bill Tupper (1974-1978, Mayor of Rideau)
2. Dave Bartlett (1978-1985, Mayor of Rideau)
3. Glenn Brooks (1986-1991, Mayor of Rideau)
4. James Stewart (1992-1994, Mayor of Rideau)
5. Betty Hill (1995-2000, Western Townships Ward)

== City councillors ==
Since the amalgamation of Rideau Township into the City of Ottawa, its constituents have elected the following to the Ottawa City Council:

Ottawa City Councillors for Rideau-Goulbourn
No.	Years	Name
1	2001–2010	Glenn Brooks
2	2010–2022	Scott Moffatt
Ward re-named Rideau-Jock
3	2022–present	David Brown

== Election results ==
=== 2000 Ottawa municipal election ===
City council
Candidate	Votes	%
Glenn Brooks	3444	65.10
James Stewart	1846	34.90

=== 2003 Ottawa municipal election ===
City council
Candidate	Votes	%
Glenn Brooks	2765	62.68
Paul Paton	1646	37.32%

=== 2006 Ottawa municipal election ===
City council
Candidate	Votes	%
Glenn Brooks	4678	44.41
Scott Moffatt	3205	30.43
Iain McCallum	1345	12.77
Jim Stewart	1305	12.39

=== 2010 Ottawa municipal election ===
City council
Candidate	Votes	%
Scott Moffatt	5048	52.64
Glenn Brooks	2539	26.48
Bruce Webster	1181	12.32
Iain McCallum	563	5.87
Bruce Chrustie	258	2.69

=== 2014 Ottawa municipal election ===
City council
Candidate	Vote	%
Scott Moffatt	5,137	62.26
Daniel Scharf	3,114	37.74

Ottawa mayor (Ward results)
Candidate	Vote	%
Jim Watson	4,771	58.58
Mike Maguire	3,191	39.18
Rebecca Pyrah	45	0.55
Darren W. Wood	36	0.44
Anwar Syed	35	0.43
Robert White	32	0.39
Bernard Couchman	19	0.23
Michael St. Arnaud	15	0.18

=== 2018 Ottawa municipal election ===
City council
Candidate	Vote	%
Scott Moffatt	5,080	55.81
David Brown	4,023	44.19

=== 2022 Ottawa municipal election ===
2022 Ottawa municipal election: Rideau—Jock Ward
Candidate	Popular vote			Expenditures
Candidate	Votes	%	±%	Expenditures
David Brown	6,901	66.64	+22.45	
Leigh-Andrea Brunet	1,654	15.97		
Kevin Setia	1,201	11.60		
Patty Searl	349	3.37		
Michael J. Nowak	251	2.42		
Total valid votes	10,356	98.03		
Total rejected, unmarked and declined votes	208	1.97		
Turnout	10,564	48.09	+1.89	
Eligible voters	21,966			
Note: Candidate campaign colours are based on the prominent colour used in campaign items (signs, literature, etc.) and are used as a visual differentiation between candidates.

=== 2026 Ottawa municipal election ===
City council
Candidate	Vote	%
David Brown	Acclaimed	
