= Scott Moffatt (politician) =

Canadian politician

Ottawa City Councillor
- In office December 1, 2010 – November 15, 2022
- Preceded by: Glenn Brooks
- Succeeded by: David Brown
- Constituency: Rideau-Goulbourn

Personal details
- Born: c. 1981 Rideau, Ontario, Canada
- Party: Independent
- Other political affiliations: Ontario Progressive Conservative Party; Conservative Party of Canada

Scott Moffatt (born c. 1981 in Rideau Township, Ontario) is a Canadian politician. He was the Ottawa city councillor for Rideau-Goulbourn Ward from 2010 to 2022. He first won the ward in the 2010 Ottawa municipal election, defeating the incumbent Glenn Brooks.

Moffatt was born and raised on a farm in Rideau Township, now part of rural Ottawa. He attended Kars Public School (which has since become Kars on the Rideau Public School), South Carleton High School and received a General B.A. from Carleton University. He lives in North Gower, Ontario. Prior to being elected, he served as a retail and golf course manager.

Moffatt has volunteered for the Conservative Party of Canada in the past and served on its board of directors. He ran unsuccessfully in the Rideau-Goulbourn Ward in the 2006 Ottawa municipal election.
