= Swords and Ploughshares Museum =

Canadian military museum

Coordinates: 45.09166°N 75.642635°W

The Swords And Ploughshares Museum
- Established: 1987
- Location: Kars, Ontario, Canada
- Website: www.calnan.com/swords/

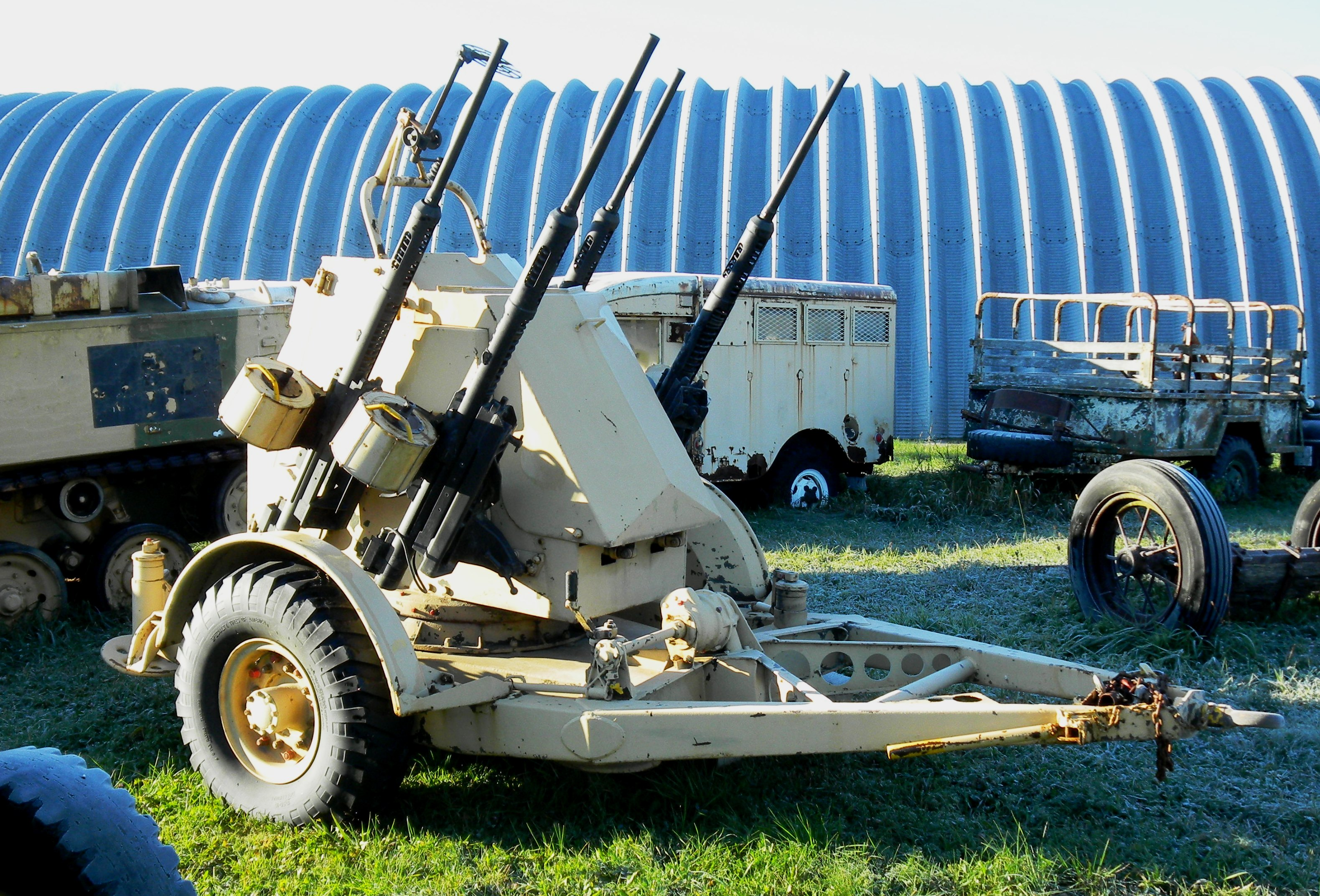
Polsten 20-mm towed quadruple-barrelled AA gun

The Swords and Ploughshares Museum is a private military museum located south of the village of Kars, Ontario, Canada. The Museum is focused on a specific aspect of Canadian military history: the Citizen Soldier (the Militiaman and Reservist) at peace and at war. The Museum uses vehicles and artifacts to demonstrate how they could be adapted and used by Citizen Soldiers for both military and civilian purposes. For example, a Ram tank from World War II that was modified after the war to serve as a snowplow was a featured display at the Museum for many years.

Amongst the artifacts and equipment that the Museum displays is a 1942 Bofors 40 mm Light Anti-Aircraft Gun which is maintained as a living monument and memorial for Canadian anti-aircraft gunners.

== History ==
The Museum was originally formed in 1987 by Captain (now Major) M.T. Calnan and Captain M.J. Hilash, military history enthusiasts and private collectors of militaria. The two combined their efforts and collections to form the Swords and Ploughshares Museum so that they could display their artifacts and further public knowledge of Canadian military history. Land was purchased south of Kars, Ontario in the late 1980s with construction of a steel building to house the vehicles following in the summer of 1991.

Colonel Michael David Calnan, CD served as the Honorary Chairman of the Museum from its founding in 1987 until he died in 2018.

== Outreach program ==
The Museum does not have a large number of fixed displays and prefers to use living history practices to provide interactive displays and demonstrations. This includes participating along with historical re-enactors in special commemorative events such as the 50th Anniversary of D-day Parade held in Ottawa in 1994 and the 64th Anniversary of the Battle of Britain held at the National Aviation Museum in 2004.

The Museum regularly coordinates Canada Day parades in nearby communities such as Kemptville and Merrickville as well as in other events such as the Richmond Fair and the Kars Fair. Historic military vehicle owners from Eastern Ontario volunteer their time and vehicles for the parades.

== Media appearances ==
A brief interview and video segment on the Museum was featured in the December 15th, 2008 edition of the Canadian Army News.
