= Rideau Ward =

Rideau Ward may refer one of the following wards in Ottawa, Ontario, Canada:

- Rideau-Jock Ward, formerly Rideau-Goulbourn Ward
- Rideau-Rockcliffe Ward
- Rideau-Vanier Ward

It may also refer to one of two wards that are no longer used:

- Rideau Ward (1887-1980) which included areas such as New Edinburgh, Overbrook and Forbes
- Rideau Ward (2000-2006) which included the former Rideau Township

== See also ==
- Rideau Township, Ontario
