= Fallowfield, Ottawa =

Unincorporated village in Ottawa, Ontario, Canada

Fallowfield
- Unincorporated Village
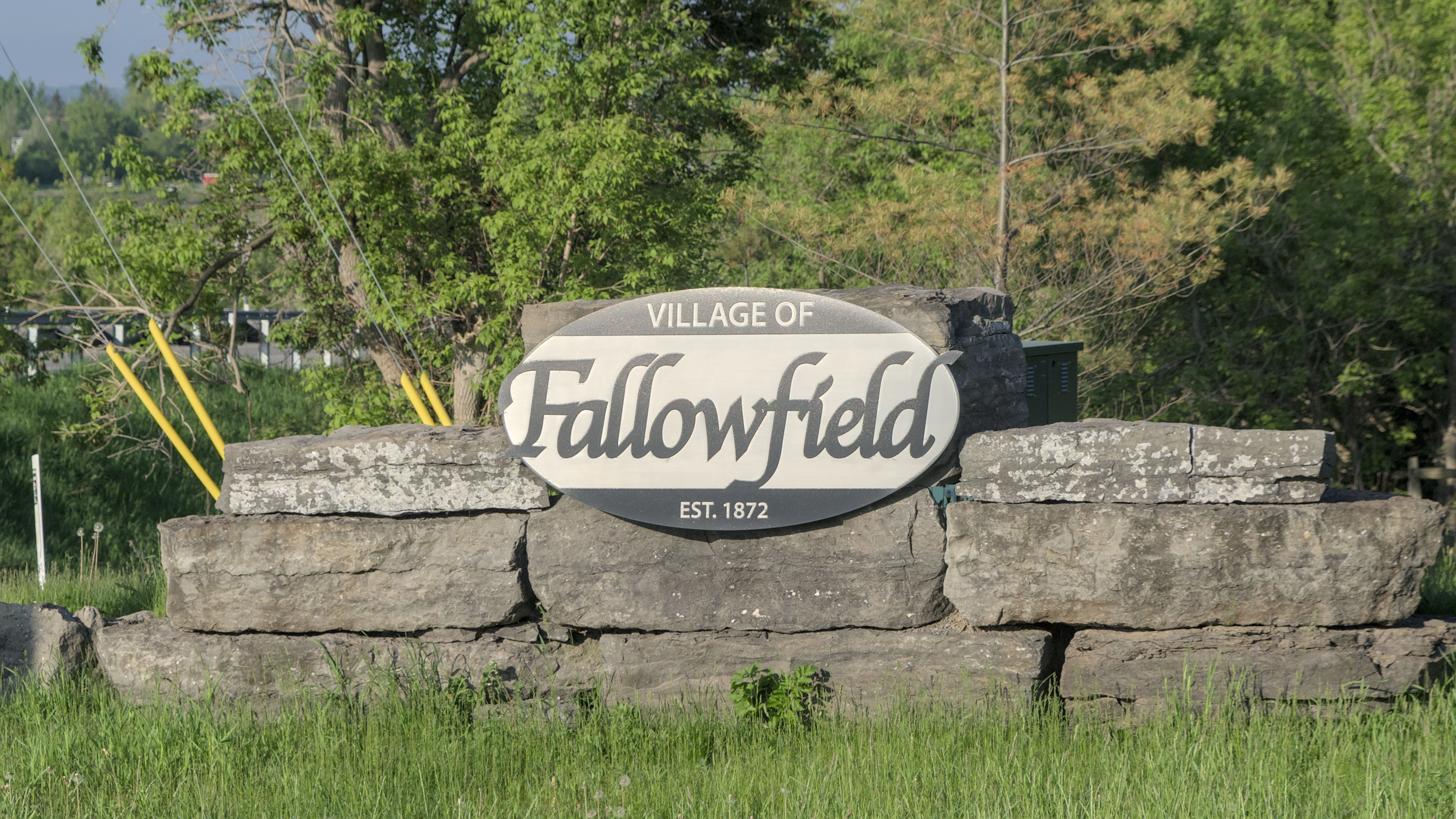
- Sign located on Steeple Hill Crescent at Fallowfield Road
- Interactive map of Fallowfield
- Country: Canada
- Province: Ontario
- City: Ottawa
- Settled: 1820s
- Post office: 1872

Government
  - MPs: Chandra Arya
  - MPPs: Lisa MacLeod
  - Councillors: David Brown
- Elevation: 110 m (350 ft)

Population (2021)
  - Total: 471
- Canada 2021 Census
- Time zone: UTC-5 (Eastern (EST))
- Postal code span: K2R 1G2-6, K2R 1C8-9, K2R 1E1-3
- Area code: (613)

Fallowfield is an unincorporated village (also known as Fallowfield Village) in the city of Ottawa, Ontario, Canada, located south-west of Bells Corners, west of Barrhaven and the 416 and north-east of Richmond within the southwest area of the city.

Fallowfield is located in the triangle of Fallowfield Road, Old Richmond Road and Steeple Hill Crescent and also includes Old Richmond Road north up to Hope Side Road. The village serves as a bedroom community for the larger urban area of Ottawa as there are no retail or commercial enterprises in the village. It assumes a rather prominent position over the surrounding countryside as the major part of the village is located on a gently terraced escarpment. The population of the village is estimated at 471 people as of 2021. Public high school students in this area go to South Carleton High School in Richmond.

== History ==
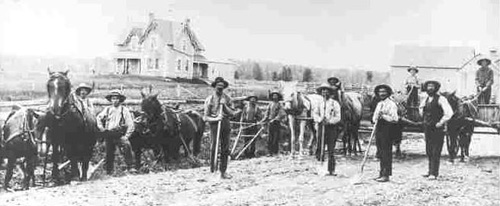
Road Gang extending Fallowfield Road to the West at Richmond Road, circa 1880 The Edward Monaghan house, pictured behind the workers, still stands and is designated under the Ontario Heritage Act.

Fallowfield Village was originally settled in the 1820s by Irish immigrants from counties Tipperary and Cork, at which time the majority of Carleton County was similarly settled. There are two churches, both along Steeple Hill: St. Patrick's Roman Catholic Church built in 1833 with the current stone chapel completed in 1866 and the Fallowfield United Church built in 1868 with the current chapel completed in 1886. The cornerstone for the United (then Methodist) church was laid by Canada's first Prime Minister, Sir John A. Macdonald. The name for the area was Piety Hill but the village name was not formalized to Fallowfield until June 1, 1872, with the appointment of a postmaster, P. Omeara, and the opening of a post office. As a direct result of this action, the village received its name, the origin of which was inspired by nearby fields that were in the process of being fallowed for the summer and is not historically linked to Fallowfield, in Manchester, England. The post office was closed June 30, 1914. For a timeline perspective, the Rideau Canal was built between 1826 and 1832 and the village of Richmond, to the southwest, was settled in 1818.

Fallowfield village was a strategic stopover point for travels between Perth, Richmond and Bytown (later to become Ottawa). By the turn of the century, Fallowfield was a bustling village and it became a favourite stopping place for travellers, especially farmers with their produce wagons and horse teams, en route to and from the market in Ottawa. At one time there were four hotels in the village to serve the travelling public. In addition, there were three carriage shops, two blacksmiths, a grist mill, tailor shop, cheese factory, shoemaker, general store and weigh scales for the farmers to weigh their produce. The widespread use of the automobile most likely rendered the village into a bedroom community as farther distances could be travelled in one day with no need for stopovers like what Fallowfield village offered.

The majority of the development was established in the early 1980s.

Rooney Park is named after the Rooney family who were Irish farmers in the village.

Fallowfield village was originally part of Nepean, Carleton County but has been within the City of Ottawa since January 1, 2001 as part of amalgamation.

June 23, 2002 saw numerous tragedies in the Ottawa area. The Lady Duck sank, the Ontario Power Generation Barrett Chute dam overflowed into the Madawaska River, killing a mother and son and Fallowfield village had a late day F2 tornado at around 5:15pm. Many trees were uprooted and homes damaged. Barns were levelled and garages damaged to the point of demolition.

== Churches ==
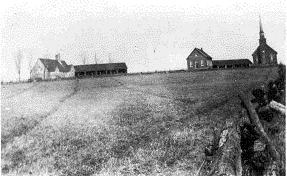
L to R: St. Barnabas Anglican, St. John's Presbyterian, and Fallowfield Methodist c.1910

Old Richmond Road used to follow what is now known as Steeple Hill, the current name coming from the fact that no less than four churches were located in a one kilometre stretch of road. These churches are, from North to South: St. Patrick's Catholic (1866), St. Barnabas Anglican (1889), St. John's Presbyterian (1886) and Fallowfield Methodist (1886). In 1925 the United Church was formed between the Presbyterian, Methodist and Congregationalist and St. John's Presbyterian was vacated and demolished in the 1940s. St. Barnabas Anglican was also demolished in the 1940s and only two churches of the original churches remain today.

== Public transit ==
The village is within 2 kilometres of an interchange with Highway 416 at Fallowfield Road.

As of 2024, the community is served by two OC Transpo routes. Route 110 offers all-day service on weekdays and limited service on weekends, connecting the community to Innovation station in Kanata and Fallowfield station in Barrhaven. Route 283 offers 6 trips towards Tunney's Pasture station in the morning peak and 4 trips towards Richmond in the afternoon peak on weekdays, with some trips also serving Munster Hamlet and Stittsville.
