= Kings Creek (Jock River tributary) =

Location
- Country: Canada
- Province: Ontario
- Region: National Capital Region

Physical characteristics
- Source
  - location: Franktown, Lanark County
  - coordinates: 45°03′26″N 76°01′03″W
  - elevation: 136 m (446 ft)
- Mouth: Jock River
  - location: Dwyer Hill, Ottawa
  - coordinates: 45°07′53″N 75°54′28″W
  - elevation: 99 m (325 ft)
- Length: 16.8 km (10.4 mi)

Kings Creek is a creek in eastern Ontario, Canada. It is a right tributary of the Jock River. It should not be confused with Kings Creek, a tributary of the Mississippi River (Ontario) nearby to the west.

== See also ==
- List of rivers of Ontario
