= North Gower Township =

Coordinates: 45°09′11″N 75°40′58″W

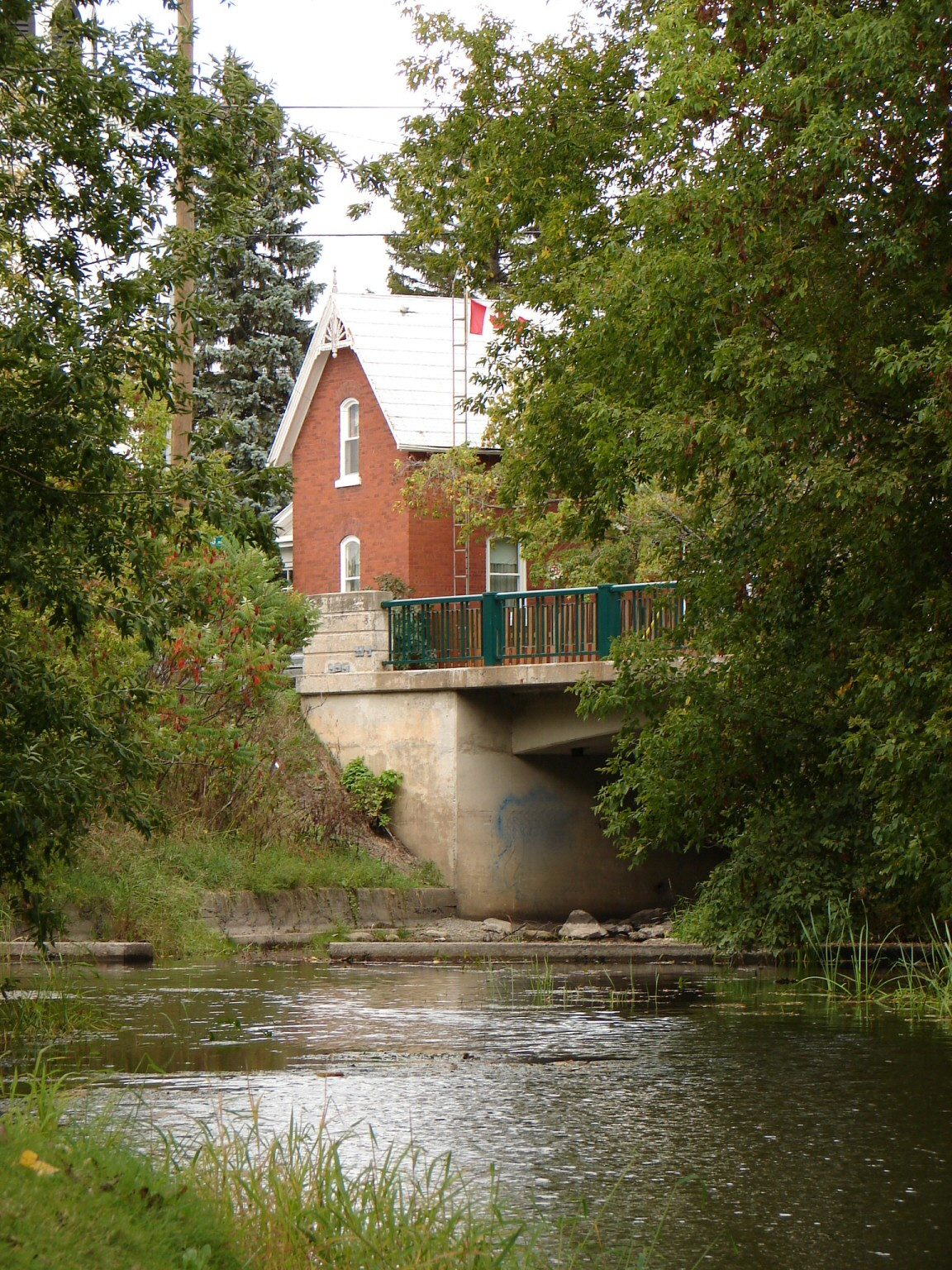
Stevens Creek running through North Gower.

North Gower Township is a former and now geographic township in eastern Ontario, Canada, now located in Ottawa. It contains the communities of Manotick and North Gower.

North Gower (pronounced "North Gor") was located in the southern part of Carleton County, bordered to the northwest by Goulbourn Township, to the north by Nepean, to the east by Osgoode and to the south by South Gower Township. It is separated from North Grenville and Osgoode by the Rideau River.

Originally known as Township C, it was established in 1792. In 1800, it became part of Carleton County and was incorporated as a township in 1850. The first settlers in the township were United Empire Loyalists. The township was first settled by Stephen Blanchard in 1820. The village of North Gower was first settled in 1846 and was originally known as Stephensville. The township merged with Marlborough Township and Long Island in 1974 to become Rideau Township. Rideau, in turn, became part of the amalgamated city of Ottawa in 2001.

North Gower Township took its name from Admiral John Leveson-Gower, Lord of the Admiralty from 1783 to 1789. At one time, there was also a South Gower Township.

According to the Canada 2016 Census, the former township had a population of 10,971 (former boundaries, including Long Island). As of the Canada 2021 Census, this had increased to 12,341.

== Reeves ==
- 1850 Robert Craig
- 1862 David Beggs
- 1864 Robert Craig, Jr.
- 1865 William Cowan
- 1870 James Wallace
- 1876 John Craig
- 1894 William Bell
- 1897 n/a
- 1907 Nicholas Leach
- 1919 W. Alexander Wallace
- 1923 Howard Craig
- 1953 Horace Seabrook
- 1960 Howard Perkins
- 1965 Ferguson Pratt

== See also ==
- List of townships in Ontario
