= Michael David Calnan =

Canadian politician

- Born: 20 July 1932; Grafton, Ontario, Canada
- Died: 2 March 2018 (aged 85) Ottawa, Ontario, Canada
- Allegiance: Canada
- Branch: Canadian Army / Canadian Forces
- Service years: 1952–1988
- Rank: Colonel (Canada)
- Commands: 1 RCHA; CFB Shilo
- Awards: Special Service Medal with NATO Bar; Canadian Centennial Medal; Queen Elizabeth II Silver Jubilee Medal; Queen Elizabeth II Diamond Jubilee Medal; Canada 125 Medal; Canadian Forces Decoration with two bars

Colonel Michael David Calnan CD (20 July 1932 – 2 March 2018) was a Canadian Forces officer notable as a serving military member given permission to run for political office while still on active duty.

== Early years ==
Michael D. Calnan was born 20 July 1932 in Grafton, Ontario to Anthony Calnan (1901–1991) and Catherine (Cass) Calnan n. Kernaghan (1903–1996). He was the second of four children with an older brother, Philip, younger brother Denis, and younger sister Mary. During the Second World War, his cousin Edward Anthony Calnan was killed in action while serving with the Queen's Own Rifles of Canada.

In his teens, Calnan attended Cobourg Collegiate Institute where he joined the school's cadet corps. This led to his initial entry into military service with the Royal Regiment of Artillery in September 1950 as a Gunner in the 33rd Medium Regiment RCA (M). In May 1951, he was selected to attend the Canadian Officer Training Corps (Method B) course at the Royal Canadian School of Artillery (RCSA) in Camp Shilo and was commissioned as a lieutenant on 25 December 1951.

== Military career ==
After completion of high school, he was called out in July 1952 initially to Headquarters Camp Petawawa and then to the Royal Canadian School of Artillery (Anti-Aircraft) in Camp Picton. In January 1953, he transferred to the Regular Force and reverted to the rank of Officer Cadet. Calnan took Officer Cadet Program (OCP) Phase III training with 2 RCHA in Winnipeg and upon completion of OCP Phase IV at the RCSA in May 1953, he was commissioned for a second time but this time as a second lieutenant.

His first posting was to Z Battery (Para) in Camp Shilo and upon completion of the parachute course, he joined the 4.2-inch mortar battery during its summer concentration in Wainwright, Alberta. Parachuting, winter exercises in Fort Churchill, and attendance at the Subalterns Long Course at Royal Military College in 1954 preceded his promotion to Lieutenant in July 1955. Upon promotion, he was posted to HQ RCA, 1 Canadian Infantry Division in Petawawa as Staff Learner, Royal Artillery and participated in the first divisional exercises to be held in the new Camp Gagetown.

In 1957, he attended the Long Technical Gunnery Course at RCSA and in September 1957, was posted to A Battery, 1 RCHA as a Gun Position Officer (GPO) for B Troop in Winnipeg. He sailed with the Regiment to Fort Prince of Wales in Deilinghofen, West Germany, in November 1957. In 1958, Lieutenant Calnan became the Command Post Officer (CPO) for A Battery followed by a tour as Intelligence Officer in 1959.

In July 1960, upon promotion to captain, he joined the advance party for the Regiment's rotation to Gagetown as Adjutant. When rotation was completed in September, Captain Calnan was posted to HQ 3 CIBG in Gagetown as Staff Captain Q, a position he held for three years.

He then returned to A Battery, 1 RCHA, in Gagetown: first as Troop Commander A Troop, then as Regimental Command Post Officer.

In November 1964, he was appointed Battery Commander of H Battery, winning the regimental "Quick Action" competition with 155mm towed howitzers in the spring of 1965.

In 1965–1966, Captain Calnan attended the Canadian Army Command and Staff College where he was promoted to major in February 1966 and graduated in July. In August 1966, he was appointed GSO2 Operations of 1 Infantry Division (British Army on the Rhine) in Verden, West Germany.

In August 1968, Major Calnan was appointed Battery Commander of G Battery, 3 RCHA, in Winnipeg; and as part of the Ace Mobile Force, G Battery attended the Force Artillery concentration in the spring of 1969 in Germany and Belgium, winning the Barbara Cup, a first for Canada.

In July 1969, he was promoted to lieutenant-colonel to command 1RCHA in Deilinghofen, West Germany. During his command, his major endeavour was to successfully retain a three-battery regiment when the original direction from headquarters was to reduce the Regiment to two batteries. Also, at this time, the regiment exchanged its brass and battledress for CF greens and was the first unit of 4 CMBG to move to CFB Lahr in November 1970.

In July 1971, he was appointed SSO Ops (Senior Staff Officer, Operations), 4 CMBG in Lahr, returning to Canada in July 1973 as a senior staff officer in the Directorate of Land Operations in NDHQ, Ottawa. In September 1974, he was promoted to colonel and in November, attended French language training until appointed Base Commander of CFB Shilo in July 1975.

Colonel Calnan returned to NDHQ in 1977 as a senior evaluation analyst in the policy group. In January 1979, after completing a 15-month study into the ammunition policies and programmes in the Canadian Forces, he was appointed Chairman of the Ammunition Task Force and special assistant to the Deputy Chief of Defence Staff. In July 1980, he was appointed Director of Operational Guidance Coordination and became the Director General of Ammunition in August 1983.

== Political career ==
Calnan received permission from the Department of National Defence to run in the 1982 Ontario municipal elections for the office of Councillor in Rideau Township while still serving on active duty in the military. He was re-elected as Councillor for Ward 3 in the 1985 Ontario municipal elections and again in the 1988 Ontario municipal elections, serving on Council until losing his seat in the 1991 Ontario municipal elections.

A long-standing member of the Progressive Conservative Party of Canada (PC), Calnan served as a campaign manager for Kay Stanley's attempt to win the PC nomination for the riding of Nepean-Carleton in advance of the 1984 election. Stanley lost the nomination to William Tupper who won the seat and served in Parliament for four years.

Calnan also served as a local campaign coordinator for the attempt by Maureen McTeer to win the Parliamentary seat for Carleton-Gloucester in the 34th General Election of 1988, a seat that was won by the Liberal Party candidate, Eugène Bellemare.

== Later career ==
After retiring from the military in 1988, Colonel Calnan formed his own consulting company, M.D. Calnan & Associates, with which he provided consulting services to ammunition vendors such as CXA Ltd. in Brownsburg, Quebec.

Following the end of the Cold War in 1991 and the subsequent decrease in Canadian defense spending, the need for defense procurement consultants also decreased and Colonel Calnan transitioned his company from providing consulting services to investing in real estate. He had previously owned land in his hometown of Grafton while still in the military but only began serious investments in real estate after he had retired.

In conjunction with a business partner, Colonel Calnan purchased and developed a 64-hectare plot of land that they named Fairmile Estates located at the corner of McCordick Road and Donnelly Drive south of North Gower, Ontario. After fifteen years, Colonel Calnan sold his half of the development business to his partner's estate and retired completely from real estate and other business ventures.

== Community activities ==
Born and raised a Roman Catholic, Colonel Calnan volunteered to act as the Chairman of the Building Committee in 1980 for the construction of Saint Leonard's church in Manotick. Opening services for the new church were held on 21 June 1981 and the church has been active since that time.

Calnan was also a member of the Royal Canadian Legion and served on the Executive Committee of South Carleton Branch #314 from 1980 to 1997 including five terms as President.

Calnan also served as the Honorary President of the Swords and Ploughshares Museum from its founding in 1987 until he died.

== Personal life ==
In July 1958, then Lieutenant Calnan married Barbara Teresa Cully of Pembroke in a ceremony at Saint Columkille's Church. They were married for almost sixty years and had four children including Michael Jr., Susan, Patrick, and Janice.

== Honours ==
The following honors were conferred on Calnan:

- Special Service Medal with NATO Bar
- Canadian Centennial Medal
- Queen Elizabeth II Silver Jubilee Medal
- Queen Elizabeth II Diamond Jubilee Medal
- Canada 125 Medal
- Canadian Forces Decoration with two bars
