= Glenn Brooks =

Canadian politician

Ottawa City Councillor
- In office January 1, 2001 – November 30, 2010
- Preceded by: None, area amalgamated into city
- Succeeded by: Scott Moffatt
- Constituency: Rideau-Goulbourn Ward

Mayor of Rideau Township
- In office January 1, 1986 – January 1, 1992
- Preceded by: Dave Bartlett
- Succeeded by: James Stewart
- In office January 1, 1998 – January 1, 2001
- Preceded by: James Stewart
- Succeeded by: Township amalgamated into city

Personal details
- Born: Robert Brooks
- Party: Conservative Party of Canada
- Spouse: Gail Wallace

Robert "Glenn" Brooks is a Canadian politician who was mayor of Rideau Township and later Ottawa City Councillor representing the rural Rideau-Goulbourn Ward. He grew up on a dairy farm outside of Oshawa and became a science teacher, he and his wife Gail operated a small beef cattle farm.

He was first elected to the Rideau Township council in 1977. A teacher by profession he ran for mayor of the township in 1978 but lost to David Bartlett. Brooks remained a councillor and defeated Bartlett in a 1985 rematch. In 1991 Brooks was defeated by local businessman James Stewart, whom Brooks had defeated in his 1988 reelection. Brooks was nominated as the Reform Party candidate for the riding of Nepean—Carleton, but in March 1997 he resigned due to conflicts with the riding association before the election. Later that year he defeated Stewart to regain the mayoralty.

Brooks was a strong opponent of the amalgamation of Rideau Township into the city of Ottawa, but once the new city was created he chose to run for the role of Rideau's representative to the city. The race again pitted Brooks against Stewart. Brooks won by a substantial margin and was reelected by approximately the same margin in the 2003 Ottawa election against Paul Paton. In the 2006 election Brooks was challenged by Scott Moffatt, but was reelected. In the 2010 election Moffat again challenged Brooks, and this time won by a substantial margin.

Preceded by None, ward amalgamated into Ottawa in 2000	City councillors from Rideau Ward; 2000–2006	Succeeded by Ward abolished
Preceded by Ward created	City councillors from Rideau-Goulbourn Ward; 2006–2010	Succeeded by Scott Moffatt
