= Munster, Ontario =

Munster
- Unincorporated village
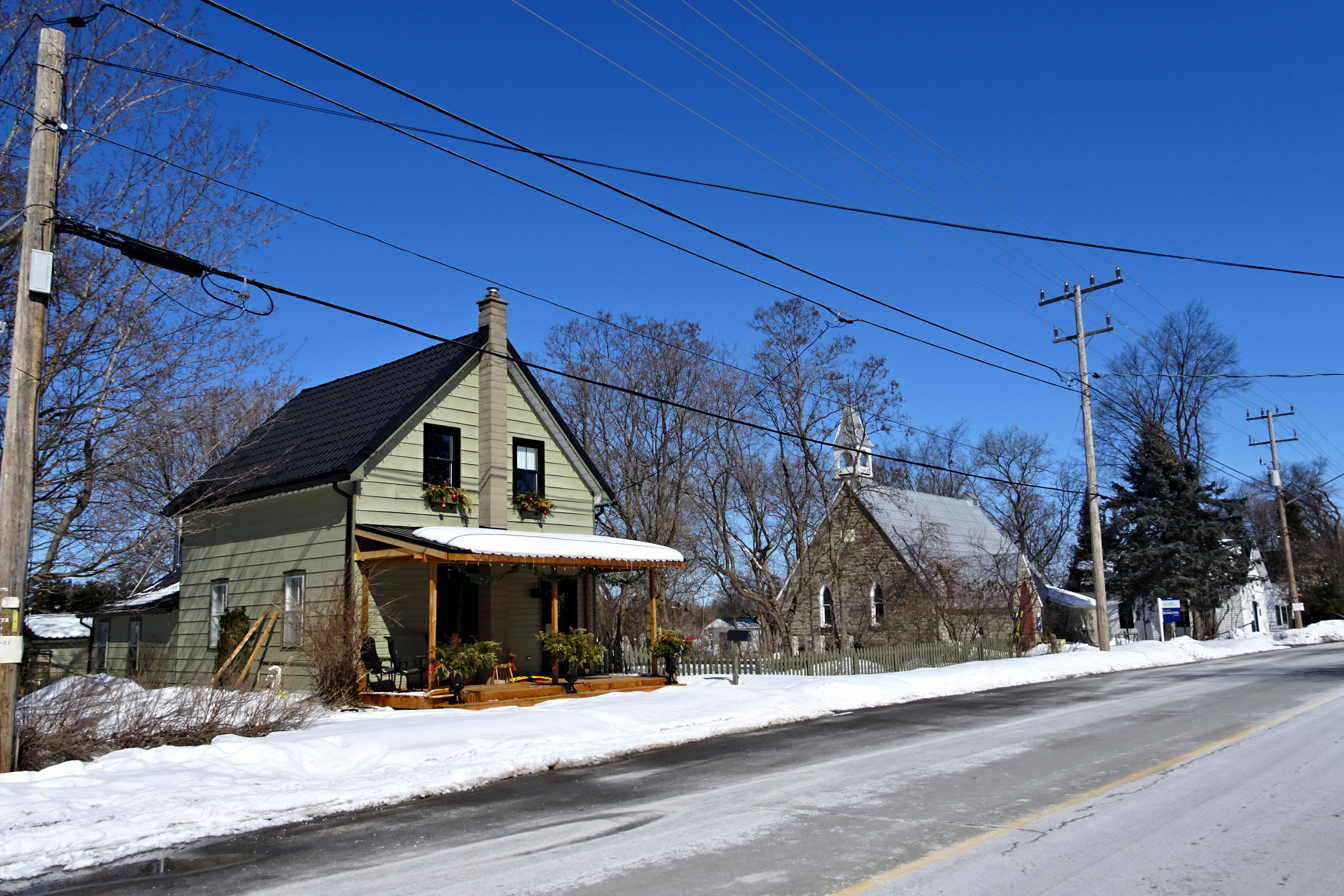

- Location in Ottawa Munster (Southern Ontario)
- Coordinates: 45°10′N 75°56′W
- Country: Canada
- Province: Ontario
- City: Ottawa

Government
  - City Councillor: David Brown
  - Member of Parliament: Bruce Fanjoy
  - Member of Provincial Parliament: George Darouze

Area
  - Land: 0.67 km^{2} (0.26 sq mi)

Population (2016)
  - Total: 939
  - Density: 1,400.2/km^{2} (3,627/sq mi)
- Time zone: UTC−05:00 (EST)
  - Summer (DST): UTC−04:00 (EDT)
- Website: munsteronline.ca

Munster, Ontario (also known as Munster Hamlet) is a large village situated south-west of Stittsville, west of Richmond and north of North Gower. The total population, as of the 2016 Canadian Census was 939, a decrease of 24.4% from the 2011 Canadian Census figure of 1,242.

== History ==
Munster was established as a post office in the Goulbourn Township by 1866; Thomas Tubman served as postmaster.

Munster was home to the Anglican parish church of St. Stephens, which closed in the 1960s. At that time, Munster was a simple cross-roads village of a handful of houses. In the 1970s, a rural suburb, marketed as Munster Hamlet, added about 400 houses to the community. The community was built in four quadrants. The church was then re-opened as the Munster branch of the Ottawa Public Library.

Since 1 January 2001, it has been a part of the City of Ottawa. This was part of a massive amalgamation, resulting in the various municipalities within the former Regional Municipality of Ottawa–Carleton combining to form the larger city that exists today.

After the amalgamation into the City of Ottawa, some in Munster, as a rural suburb of the city, remain opposed to the amalgamation - refer to Carleton County, Ontario for more information.

== Geography ==
Munster has a restaurant, United Church, Loyal Orange Lodge # 917 (warrant issued in 1875), Ladies Orange Benevolent Association # 164, Apprentice Boys of Derry - No Surrender Club - Ottawa Branch and is the site of Saunders Farm, which has outdoor mazes and a Halloween theme park.

Munster is named after the province of Munster, in Ireland.

Public high school students in this area go to South Carleton High School in Richmond and middle school students go to Goulbourn Middle School. The Ottawa-Carleton District School Board used to run an elementary school named Munster Elementary School which closed in 2015.
