= North Gower =

- Community
- Location in Ottawa
- Coordinates: 45°8′0″N 75°43′0″W
- Country: Canada
- Province: Ontario
- City: Ottawa
- Established: 1846
- Incorporated: 1905 (Police Village of North Gower)
- Amalgamation: 1974 (Township of Rideau); 2001 (City of Ottawa)

Government
  - MPs: Bruce Fanjoy
  - MPPs: George Darouze
  - Councillors: David Brown

Area
  - Total: 19.001 km^{2} (7.336 sq mi)
- Elevation: 90 m (300 ft)

Population (2016)
  - Total: 2,187
  - Density: 115.1/km^{2} (298.1/sq mi)
- Canada 2016 Census
- Time zone: UTC−5 (Eastern (EST))
  - Summer (DST): UTC−4 (EDT)

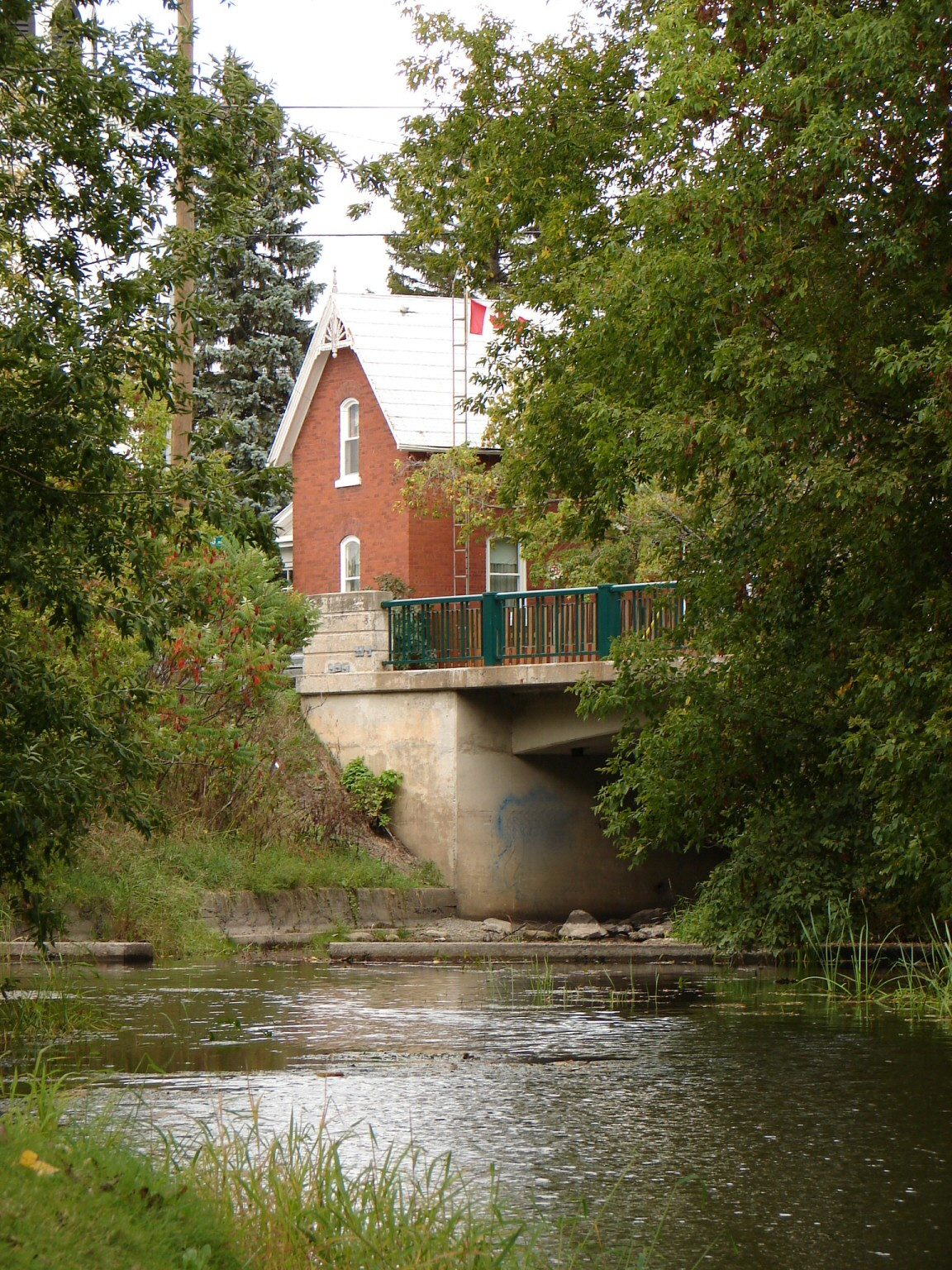
Stevens Creek running through North Gower.

North Gower (/ɡɔːr/) is a small village in eastern Ontario, originally part of North Gower Township, now part of the city of Ottawa. Surrounding communities include Richmond, Kemptville, Kars and Manotick. Public high school students in this area go to South Carleton High School in Richmond. Elementary school students go to Marlborough Public School in North Gower.

The village took its name from Admiral John Leveson-Gower, Lord of the Admiralty from 1783 to 1789.

== History ==
By 1866, North Gower was a post village of the township of North Gower 6 miles from Osgoode Station, on the Ottawa and Prescott Railway, and 22 miles from Ottawa. It was situated on Stevens Creek. The village contained four general stores, two wagon shops, five boot and shoe shops, and other mechanical trades. There were three churches, the Church of England, Rev. Mr. Merritt, rector; the Wesleyan Methodist, Rev. W m. M. Pattyson, minister; and the Canada Presbyterian Church, Rev. Wm: Lochead minister. There was a school, with an average attendance of forty-eight pupils. The 5th Division Courts were held here.

In 2001, North Gower was amalgamated into Ottawa along with the remainder of Carleton County.

== Historical buildings ==
- City of Ottawa Archives, Rideau Branch (1876) - 6581 Fourth Line Road. The former North Gower Township town hall was restored in 1980s and opened as the Rideau Township Archive in 1990. The one-storey, brick-faced building features fine proportions, careful detailing, and a cupola. The archives photo displays highlight the postal history of Rideau and the stories of home children in the area. The archives was included amongst other architecturally interesting and historically significant buildings in Doors Open Ottawa, held June 2 and 3, 2012.
- Former Marlborough Township Hall (1855) - 3048 Pierce Rd, Pierces Corners. Constructed by Robert Mackey as a community centre, the one-story frame building was moved to its present site in 1934. The framing uses a series of posts and trusses that allows a clear ceiling.
- Holy Trinity Anglican Church (1879) - 2372 Church St. A single-story stone church supported by heavy stone buttresses and fronted with an imposing bell tower, it sites on land originally deeded to the Synod of the Diocese of Ontario in 1867. Tall stained glass windows dominate the Sanctuary while commemorative ones are displayed throughout the church. The Church also has its own Churchyard Cemetery - a beautiful example of a rural churchyard cemetery, still with lots available to the parishioners and the general community.
- North Gower United Church (1870) - 2332 Church Street. A traditional white-painted wood-frame church, North Gower United Church was originally built in 1870 as the North Gower Presbyterian Church. When the United Church of Canada was formed in 1925 from elements of the Presbyterian, Methodist and Congregational Union faiths, it became North Gower United Church. Its steeple makes it the tallest occupied building in North Gower (i.e., excluding farm structures such as silos).
- St. John the Baptist Anglican Church (1892) - 3027 Pierce Rd., Pierces Corners. This solid timber-frame church designed by Amaldi and Caldeson, Architects, has stone foundation and central bell tower. All original pews and stained glass windows. Church stable, once used for the congregation's horses, still stands. This church was decommissioned in 2008 (approximately).
- The Old Co-op.

== Notable people ==
- Frederick Jamieson, lawyer, politician, and military veteran
