= Edward Malloch =

British soldier and Upper Canada politician

Edward Malloch (1801–1867) was a merchant and political figure in Upper Canada.

Born in Scotland, Edward Malloch settled in Richmond about the time of the building of the Rideau Canal, shortly after the area was settled by members of the 100th Regiment of Foot. There he married Margaret Lindsey Hill of Amherstburg and daughter of Maria Hill. Edward and Margaret opened a general store which supplied the workers during the building of the Rideau Canal, where Malloch was a "merchant, politician and local land shark" buying at least 8,000 acres (32 km^{2}) in the Richmond area plus 5,100 acres (21 km^{2}) in Loyalist rights. They later moved to Bytown (now Ottawa) where he served with the Carleton militia, becoming captain in 1837. He represented Carleton in the Legislative Assembly of Upper Canada from 1834 to 1841 and in the Legislative Assembly of the Province of Canada (Conservative) from 1848 to 1854. He also served as the first sheriff for Carleton County. He died in 1867 and was interred at the National Beechwood Cemetery in Ottawa.

His daughter Maria married James Alexander Grant, who was later elected to the Canadian House of Commons.
