= Stevens Creek (Ontario) =

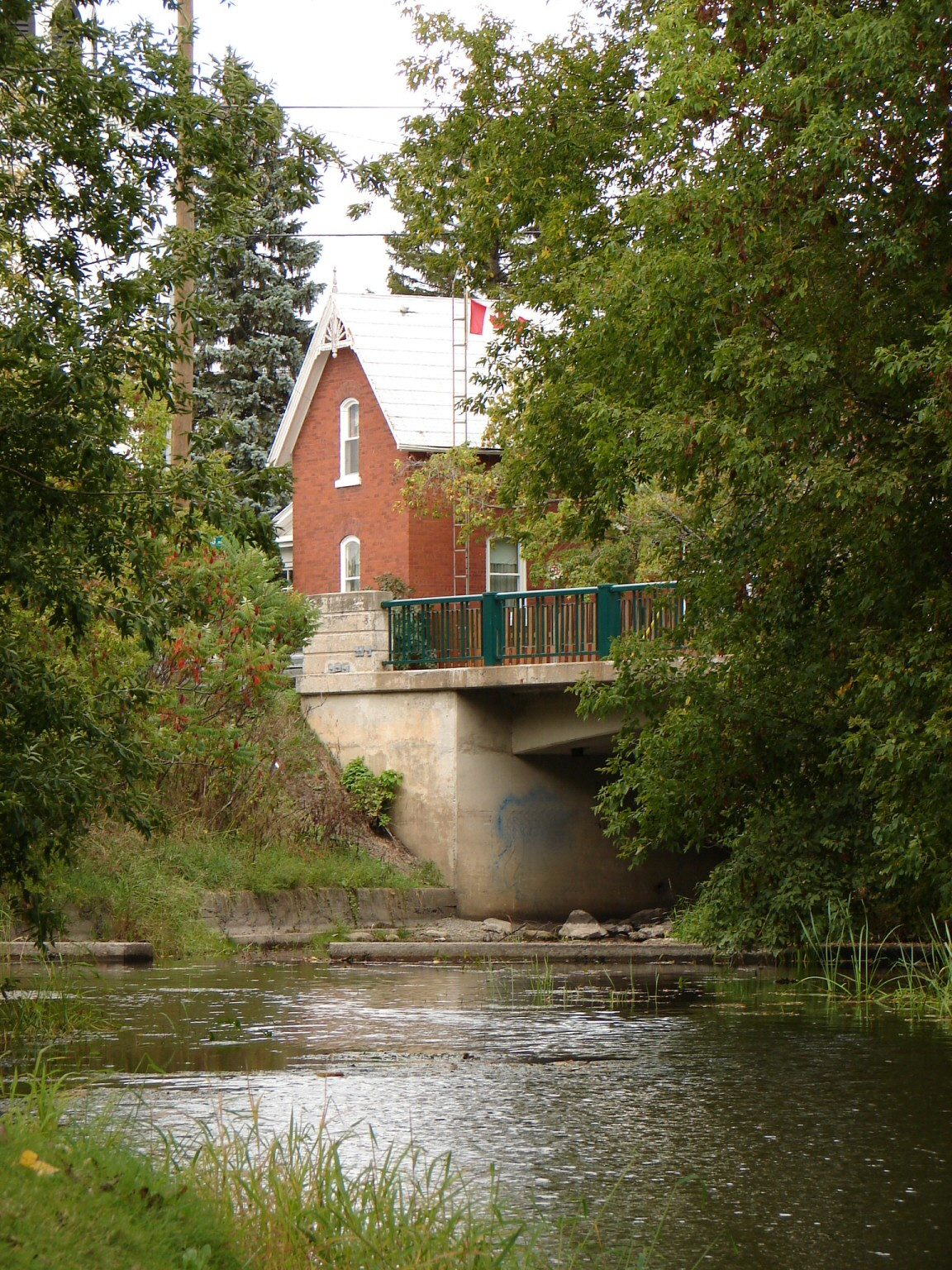
- Stevens Creek in North Gower

- Location within Southern Ontario

Location
- Country: Canada
- Province: Ontario
- Municipality: Ottawa

Physical characteristics
- Source: Marlborough Forest
- Mouth: Rideau River
  - location: Kars
  - coordinates: 45°09′00″N 75°38′58″W

Stevens Creek is a stream in Ontario, Canada. It springs in the marshes of Marlborough Forest, flowing northeast to North Gower, where a smaller unnamed stream joins Stevens Creek from the north. It drains into the Rideau River in Kars at its most easterly point.

Stevens Creek was named for Roger Stevens, a United Empire Loyalist and British spy who drowned there in 1793.

== See also ==
- List of rivers of Ontario
