= Ashton, Ontario =

Ashton
- Unincorporated community
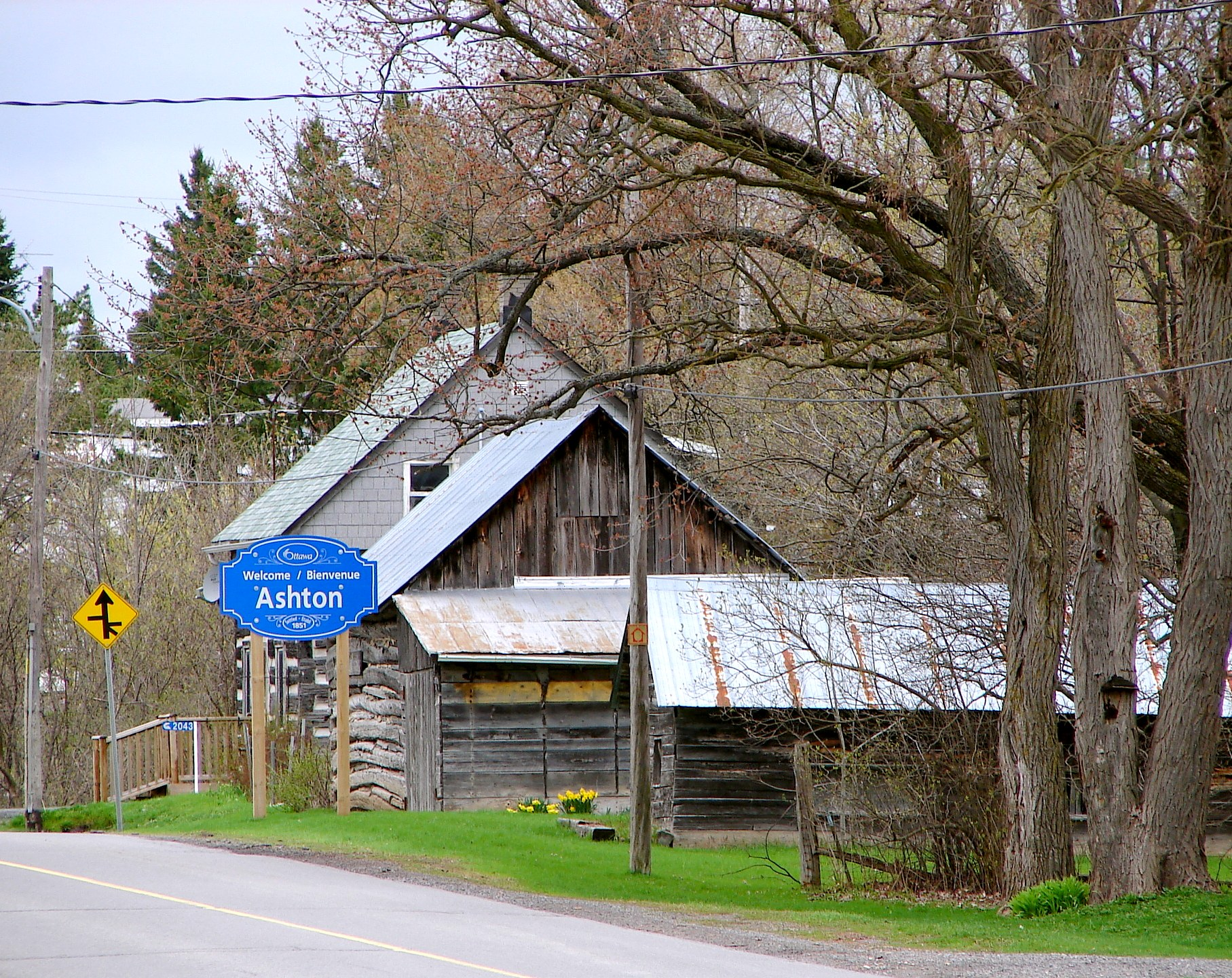

- Location within Southern Ontario
- Coordinates: 45°09′30″N 76°02′00″W
- Country: Canada
- Province: Ontario
- Municipality: Beckwith and Ottawa
- Settled: 1817

Government
  - Fed. riding: Lanark—Frontenac, Carleton
  - Prov. riding: Lanark—Frontenac—Kingston, Carleton
- Time zone: UTC-5 (EST)
  - Summer (DST): UTC-4 (EDT)
- Postal code: K0A 1B0
- Area codes: 613

The small village of Ashton is located about 40 kilometres (25 mi) southwest of Downtown Ottawa, Ontario. Ashton Station Road runs through the centre of the community, and serves as the south-western boundary line for the City of Ottawa, thus making the eastern portion of the hamlet part of Ottawa, and the western portion part of Beckwith Township.

The headwaters of the Jock River are just to the west of the hamlet. There is a general store, a pub, several churches and a community centre. Unlike many communities surrounding the burgeoning city of Ottawa, Ashton has remained relatively unchanged for many years. Public high school students in this area go to South Carleton High School in Richmond or Sacred Heart High School in Stittsville.

Movies filmed in Ashton: The Day

== History ==
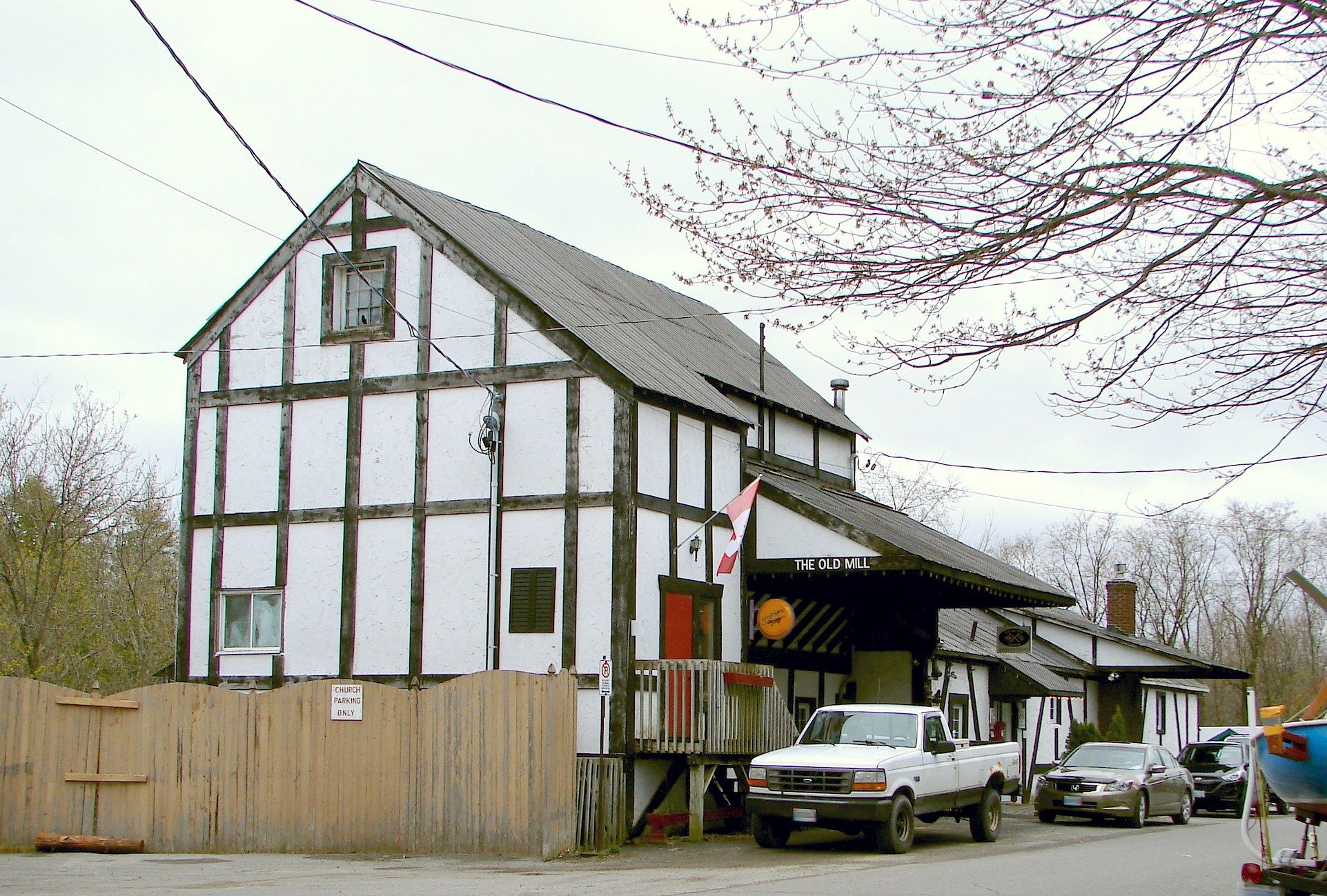
The Old Mill Pub

The first Euro-Canadian settler was William McFadden, who came in 1817. Other early settlers were former soldiers from the 100th Regiment who had received land grants there. In the mid-1820s, the village was first laid out by John Sumner, who built a mill for his logging business along the Goodwood River (now known as Jock River) and also opened a general store. In 1845, the Anglican Church was built and the post office was established in 1851, with John Sumner as the first postmaster.

By 1866–7, it was in the township of Goulbourne, close to the dividing line between the counties of Carleton and Lanark. It had a population of about 100, and contained two churches: Presbyterian, a stone edifice, and Church of England, also stone; and one common school, with an average attendance of about 40 pupils.

Originally the community was called Sumner's Corners and then Mount Pleasant. However, that name was duplicated elsewhere in the province, so it was renamed in 1851 after Ashton-under-Lyne (a suburb of Manchester, England) by John Sumner.
