= William Cowan (politician) =

Canadian politician

Reeve of North Gower
- In office 1865–1869
- Preceded by: Robert Craig, Jr.
- Succeeded by: James Wallace

Personal details
- Born: William Cowan; October 25, 1825 County Leitrim, Ireland
- Died: January 7, 1899 (aged 74) Ottawa East, Ontario
- Cause of death: Collision with locomotive
- Spouse: Caroline McCrea

Military service
- Allegiance: British Empire
- Branch/service: Canadian Militia
- Rank: Captain

William Cowan (October 25, 1825 – January 7, 1899) was a farmer and reeve of North Gower Township, Ontario.

He was born in County Leitrim, Ireland in 1825, the son of Patrick Cowan, and was educated there, earning a teaching certificate. He emigrated to North America and arrived in Bytown around 1845. He taught school in North Gower for five years. In 1850, he married Caroline McCrea; he also purchased a farm in the township around that time. Cowan was reeve for the township from 1865 to 1869. In 1866, he served as warden for Carleton County. Cowan also served as justice of the peace, was clerk in the division court for 21 years and became a captain in the local militia. In 1870, he was named secretary for the county and, in 1873, was named county treasurer. With these postings, Cowan sold his farm and moved to Ottawa, where he served on the board of Water Commissioners.

== Obituary ==
(condensed) On Saturday morning, at 8:30, Co. Treasurer Wm. Cowan and Son, Holmes Cowan, proprietor of the Gilpin House, were being driven to Ottawa East to attend the funeral of the late Chas. O'Gara, when their spirited horses took fright and ran away. The Parry Sound train was just rounding the curve at the head of the deep cut, and into this the horses dashed, striking between the tender and the baggage car ............. Mr. Cowan and his son met death instantly. .............. Mr. Cowan made his last will on Friday. Owing to the approaching marriage of his daughter Miss Maggie Cowan, he found it necessary to add a codicil .......... Wm. Cowan was born in the county Leitrim, Ireland, December 17, 1825. He came to Bytown in 1845. He taught school for five years in North Gower and then settled upon a farm which he had purchased. He married in 1850, Caroline, daughter of Capt. Thomas McCrea of Montague, a veteran of the war of 1812. About the same time he was appointed clerk of the Division Court, including North Gower and Marlboro. He held that position for 21 years. He was township councillor for eight years and reeve for five years. In 1870 he was appointed county clerk and in 1873 county treasurer, a position he held till his death.
