= Jock River =

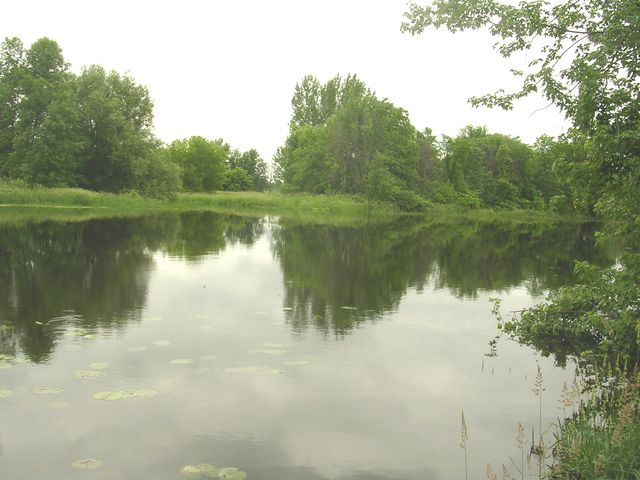
- The Jock River in Ottawa

- Location of the mouth of the Jock River in southern Ontario

Location
- Country: Canada
- Province: Ontario
- Region: Eastern Ontario
- County: Lanark
- Regional municipality: Ottawa

Physical characteristics
- Source
  - location: Franktown, Lanark County
  - coordinates: 44°58′57″N 76°03′53″W
  - elevation: 136 m (446 ft)
- Mouth: Rideau River
  - location: Ottawa
  - coordinates: 45°15′36″N 75°42′28″W
  - elevation: 79 m (259 ft)
- Length: 72 km (45 mi)
- Basin size: 551 km^{2} (213 sq mi)

Basin features
- Progression: Rideau River→ Ottawa River→ St. Lawrence River→ Gulf of St. Lawrence
- River system: Ottawa River drainage basin
- Tributaries
  - right: Nichols Creek, Kings Creek

The Jock River, known locally as the Mighty Jock, (Note: "A river runs through it: Tracing the origin of the Jock". EMC Barrhaven. 5 August 2010. Retrieved 11 August 2010. "Jock River Canoe Race". Manotick, Ontario. 2010. Retrieved 11 August 2010. "Paddlers Get Set for Annual Race Down the Mighty Jock". Stittsville Central. 31 March 2015. Retrieved 15 July 2015.) is a river in Ottawa and Lanark County in Eastern Ontario, Canada. It is in the Saint Lawrence River drainage basin and is a left tributary of the Rideau River. The river is named after Jacques, a French man who drowned in it in the early 19th century, and it was once known as the Goodwood River. The River is supported by a community-volunteer organization known as the Friends of the Jock River.

== Course ==
The river begins in the municipality of Montague in Lanark County. It flows north under the Canadian Pacific Railway main line into the municipality of Beckwith, passes under Ontario Highway 15 and past the community of Franktown into the Goodwood Marsh. It then turns east into the City of Ottawa at the community of Ashton, flows through the community of Richmond, heads under Ontario Highway 416, and reaches its mouth at the Rideau river north of the community of Manotick.

The Jock River watershed drains 551 square kilometres (213 sq mi) of land.

== Jock River Canoe Race ==
For one weekend each spring, the popular Annual Jock River Canoe Race is held between Munster Road and the town of Richmond, covering 12.5 kilometres (7.8 mi) of the river mostly through the Richmond Fen. The race, held since 1985, has grown to include now many classes of competition, such as solo and tandem canoeing and kayaking, recreational, mixed, and family.

The race is usually held in early spring to take advantage of the high water level. The race course has a few sections of Class I whitewater.

== Tributaries ==
- Nichols Creek (right)
- Kings Creek (right)

== Sources ==
- Map 6 (PDF) (Map). 1 : 700,000. Official road map of Ontario. Ministry of Transportation of Ontario. 2012-01-01.
- Map 11 (PDF) (Map). 1 : 700,000. Official road map of Ontario. Ministry of Transportation of Ontario. 2012-01-01.
- Restructured municipalities - Ontario map #5 (Map). Restructuring Maps of Ontario. Ontario Ministry of Municipal Affairs and Housing. 2006. Archived from the original on 2020-05-11.
- "Map of Lanark County". 1880 Map of Ontario Counties. The Canadian County Digital Atlas Project at McGill University. 2001.
- "Jock River Major Tributary Watershed" (PDF). Rideau Valley Conservation Authority.
