= Maria Hill, Daughter of the Regiment =

Surgeon's assistant during the War of 1812

Maria Hill
- Born: Maria Woods c. 1791; Winwick, Cheshire, England
- Died: 11 September 1881 (aged 89–90); Richmond, Ontario, Canada
- Other names: Maria Hill, Maria Taylor, Maria Glennon, Maria Glennon-Anderson
- Occupations: Surgeons' assistant, tavern owner
- Known for: War of 1812, Battle of Lundy's Lane, Battle of Chippawa, Battle of Queenston Heights, Early settler Richmond

Maria Hill (c. 1791 – 11 September 1881), a contemporary of Laura Secord, was a Canadian heroine of several battles in the Anglo-American War of 1812 including the Battle of Queenston Heights, the Battle of Lundy's Lane and the Battle of Chippawa. She was a surgeon's assistant, while her husband fought in the war. After the war, she became an early settler to Ottawa, Ontario and attended to the Governor General of Canada, Charles Lennox, 4th Duke of Richmond when he died in her village of Richmond, Upper Canada.

== Early years ==
Little is known of her early years, but it is thought that she was born Maria Woods in Winwick, Warrington, Lancashire, Great Britain to Dr. & Mrs Woods in 1791. Woods' father died between 1791 and 1799. Her mother remarried to a Mr. Greenhall, a recruiter for the British Army. In 1799, her mother died in Tuam, Ireland. Greenhall brought Woods to British North American in 1803. She was referred to as a "Daughter of the Regiment" because of her stepfathers' service to the British Army and her upbringing in the Niagara region British Army forts.

== Arrival in Canada and the War of 1812 ==
After arriving in Canada, Woods was living in Amherstberg, Ontario (likely at Fort Malden). On 5 May 1811, at the age of 20 she married Andrew Hill of the 100th Regiment of Foot. The marriage was performed by curate Richard Pollard at St. John's Anglican Church, Sandwich in the presence of Edna Lee Croft and George Ironside (store keeper). Shortly thereafter, hostilities broke out at the Detroit/Sandwich border and the 100th Regiment of Foot was called to arms.

In the book, "Faith of our Fathers, the story of the [Anglican] diocese of Ottawa", the story of Hill's wartime service was reported by a longtime Canon of Maria's local church,

As a lass from Lancashire, Miss Maria Glennon Anderson came to Upper Canada about 1810, married Sgt. Andrew Hill of the 100th Regiment, and outwitted government regulations by donning a soldier's uniform and accompanying her husband on the Niagara Campaign of 1812. You see in those days women were considered a nuisance in wartime. (it was 40 years before Florence Nightingale) –and even today the clergy allow only two women in the Synod. Mrs. Hill just snapped her fingers and carried on as a medical orderly, in disguise, at the battles of Chippewa and Queenston. Then she was run over by an ammunition wagon and, her disguise being discovered, she was hastily sent back home, probably to Kingston.

This account was reported by a Canon who served in the church 40 years after Hill had died. It likely represents a misogynistic view of 19th century women in battle rather than fact. Certainly, the 1881 interview listed below, gives no indication that Maria made any attempt to hide her identity. In fact, she appears to consider herself equally a woman, wife and soldier. Given that she served in the barracks as a child prior to marriage (earning 5p per day for doing laundry) and was married a year before hostilities broke out to a sergeant of the 100th, it seems impossible that she could disguise herself from other soldiers. It is now well established that women (mostly wives and children) were allowed to travel with the Regiment and afforded rations depending on rank. It seems much more likely that she served under her own identity as a mother and wife in the rearguard but assisting as a surgeon's aide when needed, such as in the Battles of Lundy's Lane and Chippawa. Another example of the role of woman in the War of 1812, comes from Sarah Anne Curzon's 1887 play Laura Secord, Heroine of the War of 1812 which made Laura Secord a household name in Canada. In Act II, Laura launches into a short verse about other heroic woman on the front,

She, our neighbour there
At Queenston, who when our troops stood still,
Weary and breathless, took her young babe,
Her husband under arms among the rest,
And cooked and carried for them on the field
Was she not one in whom the heroic blood
Ran thick and strong as e'er in times gone by?

In Curzon's notes, she specifies that the neighbor was Hill.

In a 1913 report of the Niagara Historical Society (which quotes as its source, the "records of Sessions commencing 14th July 1812, County of Peel") an account of Hill serving the soldiers on Queenston Heights is repeated and further detail is given that Maria Hill also cared for Laura Secord's baby while she searched for her injured husband.

Mrs. Currie has told the story of Laura Secord searching for her husband, who had been wounded at the Battle of Queenston Heights, and carrying him home. After the Battle Mrs. Secord, assisted by two other women (Maria Hill, wife of Sergeant Hill of one of the Regiments stationed at Queenston, and Mary Durham, afterwards Mrs. Swayzie), cooked food and made coffee for the troops, and attended to the wounded. There is a story told by an old lady in Chippawa, who said Mrs. Secord had told her, that Maria Hill hid her baby (who was only six months old) in the middle of a pile of cordwood, so that she could go and help Mrs. Secord look after the wounded and take care of them until other help would come from Fort George.

When examining the texts in total a picture arises of a young women who arrived with a regimental father in the forts of Niagara around the age of 8 or 9, eventually married a soldier and followed him through the battles on the Niagara frontier during the War of 1812. In the early battles, serving food and drink from the rear guard but in the later battles serving as a surgeons' assistant.

A most poignant example of Hill's service to the army comes from her own words in an interview from 1881. In Kingsford's 1887 multi-volume set, "A History of Canada", the death of Charles Lennox is reported partly based on an interview with Maria Hill. Conducted in 1881 by Mr. Walter Shanly (and his brother) just 3 months before Maria died, she describes the retreat from Chippawa to Cornwall.

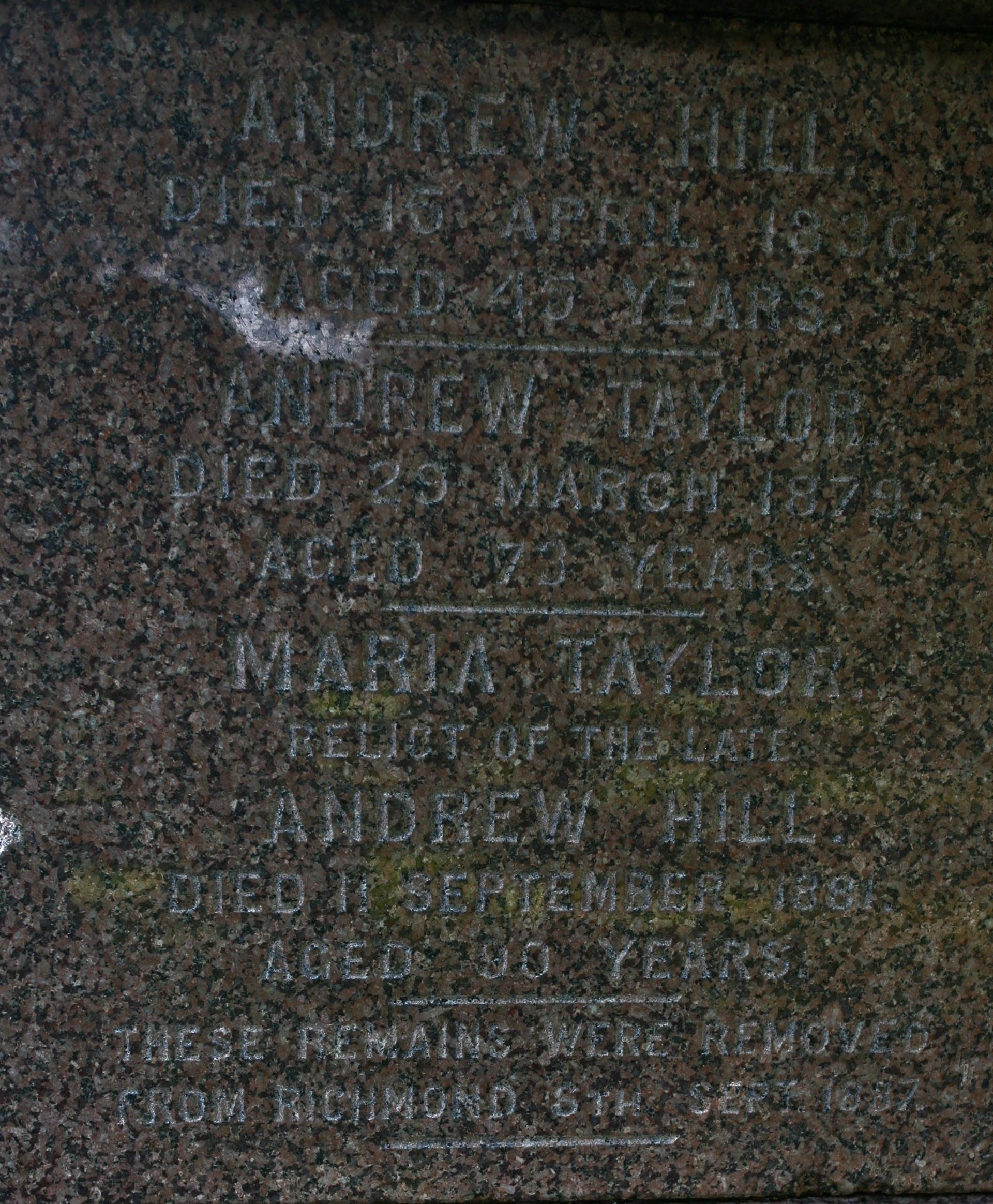
Grave marker of Maria Taylor

== Post war years ==
After the war, in 1818, Hill and her husband were reportedly boarding a ship to return to England when they were offered land and a years' provisions to create a settlement for veterans of the 100th Regiment of Foot. Andrew Hill supervised the cutting of a road (later named Richmond Road (Ontario) one of the oldest roads in Ottawa) from Richmond Landing to settle Richmond, Ontario. The original road, followed the old Chaudière portage trail and the course of the present Richmond Road.^{,}

Hill and her husband later opened an inn and tavern in Richmond, Ontario at 3607 McBean St where a smokehouse still stands and the foundations of the tavern underlie the existing house. It was there that Charles Lennox, 4th Duke of Richmond, spent his last morning, having a breakfast prepared by Hill and complaining to her of an odd feeling in his throat, before dying of rabies from a fox bite two months previously. After passing away at the house of Collis, a former surgeon to the regiment, the Duke's body was brought back to the tavern where Hill prepared the Duke for his final trip to Quebec City for burial using the Duke's own quilted bed covering as a shroud. After the visit, the Hill's tavern name was changed from the 'Masonic Arms' to the 'Duke of Richmond Arms' in honour of the visit.

Hill and her husband had two children, Jessie & Margaret Lindsey Hill. Andrew Hill died in 1830. Hill then married Andrew Taylor, a Sergeant from the 100th Foot. They lived the remainder of their lives in Richmond, Upper Canada. Andrew Taylor died 29 March 1879, aged 79 years and Maria Woods Hill Taylor died 11 September 1881, aged 90 years. She left her estate to the St. John's Anglican Church in Richmond for a new church spire. Maria and both husbands were eventually interred at the National Beechwood Cemetery in Ottawa in the family plot of Edward Malloch II her son-in-law.

== Persons of National Historic Significance (Canada) ==
Maria Hill was submitted as a Person of National Historic Significance in Canada on 8 August 2013, (File Number: N-1232(P)) and denied.
