= South Carleton High School =

Location
- 3673 McBean St; Ottawa, Ontario, K0A 2Z0; Canada; 45.186228°N 75.827647°W

Information
- Founded: 1952
- School board: Ottawa Carleton District School Board
- Superintendent: Mason Don
- Area trustee: Lynn Scott
- Administrator: Nancy Annable
- Principal: Benjamin Graham
- Staff: 92 (As of 2025-2026)
- Grades: 9 to 12 (semestered)
- Enrollment: 1247 (As of the 2011-2012 school year)
- Campus: Rural
- Area: Southwestern sector of the city
- Colours: Maroon, White and Silver
- Team name: Storm
- Rival: Sacred Heart High School St. Mark High School (Manotick)
- Communities served: Stittsville, Manotick, Richmond, Riverside South, North Gower, Munster, Kars, Fallowfield, Ashton, Burritts Rapids
- Feeder schools: Goulbourn Middle School, Kars on the Rideau Public School, A. Lorne Cassidy Elementary School
- Website: www.southcarletonhs.ocdsb.ca

South Carleton High School is a high school situated in the southwestern sector of the city of Ottawa, in the town of Richmond, Ontario. The school is under the jurisdiction of the Ottawa-Carleton District School Board. The SCHS attendance boundaries cover a major section of the southern part of the Ottawa-Carleton District School Board. Students come from all over the southwestern sector of the city but mainly from the communities of Stittsville, Manotick, Richmond, Riverside South, North Gower, Munster, Kars, Fallowfield, Ashton, Burritts Rapids and the area connecting these communities. SCHS feeder schools include Goulbourn Middle School, Kars on the Rideau Public School, and A. Lorne Cassidy Elementary School.

The school opened in 1952 to 263 students and 13 teachers under the leadership of its first principal, W.W. Powell. South Carleton's 60th anniversary was celebrated in 2012.

== Athletics ==
South Carleton has a wide range of athletic activities.

=== Ski ===
The Alpine ski team has won 8 OFSAA titles to date and 32 OFSAA team medals overall, including the boys' team with 2 titles (GS, Sl) in 2002 as well as 2008(Sl), 2009(Sl) and 2015 (GS) and their first girls' team title in 2012 (Sl) with followups in 2014 (Sl) and 2015 (Sl). It has sent a total of 27 teams to OFSAA who once there have collected a grand total of 32 team and 16 individual medals since 1999. The level 1 boys team won 9 consecutive NCSSAA titles from 2011-2019 with the boys and girls together winning the Art Lovett level 1 combined trophy 11 straight times. 2024 saw the boys team return to OFSAA winning silver medals in the slalom event. 2025 saw the girls team win medals in both events while winning the combined, overall provincial title.

=== Wrestling ===
Its wrestling program has won the NCSSAA championship for the past several years and produces nearly a dozen OFSAA wrestlers each year. This has led to the coining of the term "wrestle with the best".

=== Men's Rugby ===
The Senior Men's Rugby team was undefeated in regular season in 2007 and 2008, including a 2008 NCSSAA championship win.

=== Swim ===
South Carleton's varsity swim team was formed during the 2010–11 season, and won two NCSSAA medals, both of which were gold, sending one swimmer to OFSAA. In the 2011–12 season once again one swimmer qualified for OFSAA, winning a bronze medal for SC.

=== Basketball ===
The Storm basketball team has won several city titles in its history, including the most recent visit to the NCSSAA championship in the 2008–09 season.

=== Soccer ===
The South Carleton Junior Boys' soccer team captured the 2008 NCSSAA Gold Medal after an undefeated season.

The Senior Boys' Soccer team won the 2016 NCSSAA final and qualified for OFSAA.

=== Football ===
South Carleton's football team had reached the NCSSAA finals in 2006 and 2008, losing both times, and lost in the NCSSAA semi-finals in 2007.

=== Mock Trial ===
The South Carleton Mock trial team won the OBA OJEN city-wide tournament in 2023.

=== Baseball ===
The baseball team captured their 3rd NCSSAA tier 2 title in 4 years in 2012 and have won 5 titles overall (including a Tier 1 title in 2004) since 2003. 2023 saw the team's most recent title, claiming the tier 1 championship with a hard fought, 5-2 victory over St.FX

== Arts ==
South Carleton High School is home to one of the largest arts programs in the OCDSB. All attending students have the opportunity to enroll in Visual Arts, Music, Dance, Drama, and Media Studies.

=== Dance Shows ===
The annual dance show is the institution's largest arts display, typically attracting a cumulative 500-600+ audience.

The Fall 2016 Dance Performance was dedicated in honour of Prince under the name of "Tribute to Broadway," and the Spring 2017 Show paid tribute to the 150th anniversary of Canadian Confederation. The Fall 2017 Show honoured Pink, and the Spring 2018 Show paid homage to the town of Richmond's 200th anniversary of foundation.

== Bob Erwin Football Field ==
On October 6, 2005, during half-time at the Senior Football game, the South Carleton Football Field was dedicated to Bob Erwin, teacher and coach at South Carleton for 33 years.

== Notable alumni ==
- Trinity Lowthian, wheelchair fencer, IWAS Pan Am championships
- Nick Durocher, musician performing under the name TALK
- Iain Reid, Canadian novelist, Foe

== See also ==
- Education in Ontario
- List of secondary schools in Ontario
