= Kings Creek (Mississippi River Ontario) =

Location
- Country: Canada
- State: Ontario
- County: Lanark
- Municipality: Scotch Corners

Physical characteristics
- Source
  - coordinates: 45°04′13″N 76°11′40″W
  - elevation: 140 m (460 ft)
- Mouth: Mississippi Lake
  - coordinates: 45°05′14″N 76°10′53″W
  - elevation: 134 m (440 ft)
- Length: 2.56 km (1.59 mi)

Basin features
- River system: Mississippi River (Ontario) system

Kings Creek is a creek in eastern Ontario, Canada. It is a left tributary of the Mississippi River (Ontario) and flows into that river system at Mississippi Lake.

== See also ==
- List of rivers of Ontario
