= Kars, Ontario =

Village on the Rideau River in Ontario, Canada

Coordinates: 45°09′10″N 75°38′50″W

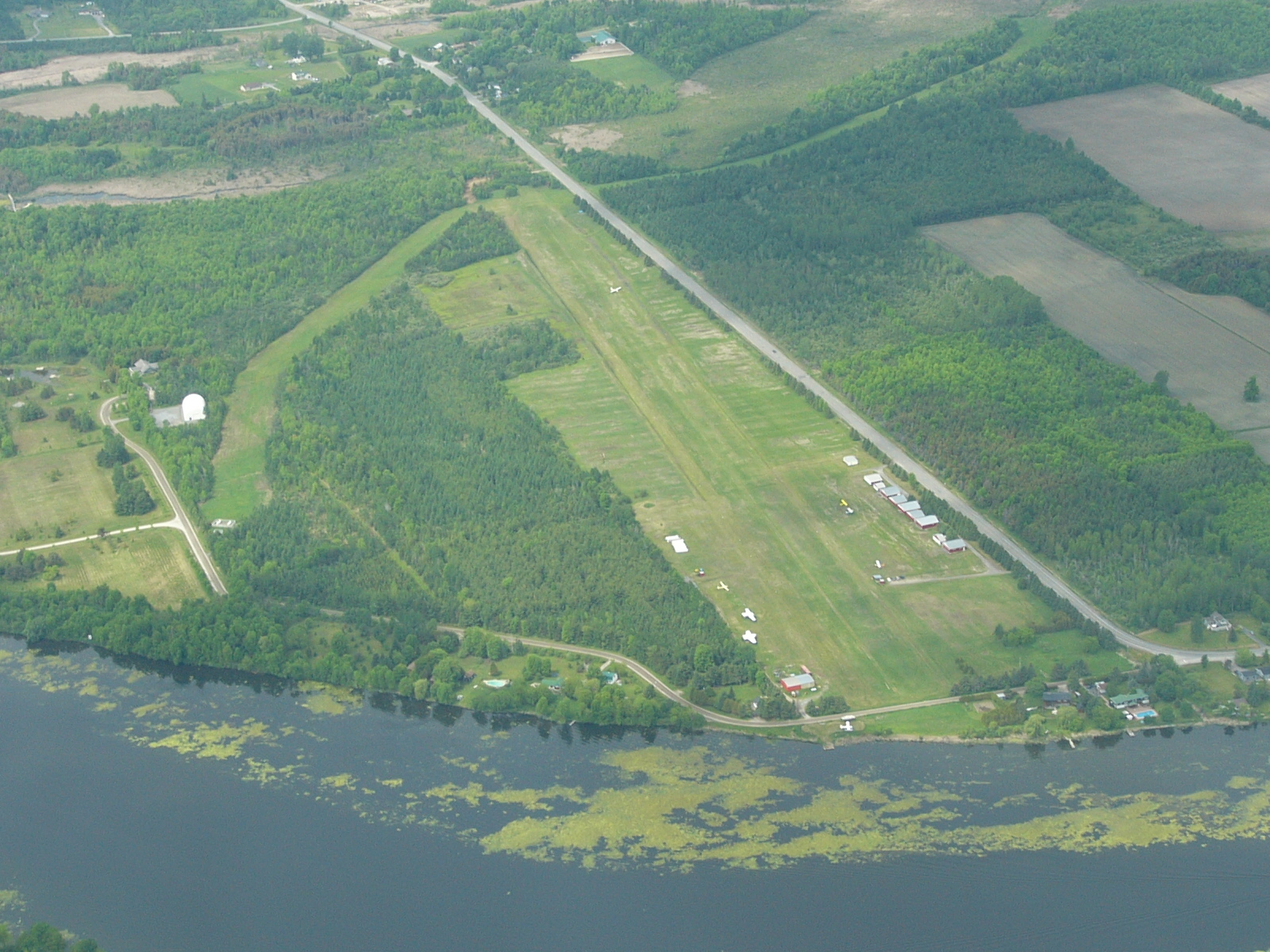

Kars is a village on the Rideau River within Rideau-Jock Ward in the city of Ottawa, Ontario. Prior to joining the city in 2000 it was part of Rideau Township.

== History ==
Kars was originally named Wellington Village. In 1857, to distinguish it from another settlement called Wellington in Prince Edward County, because mail intended for one often went to the other, the village was renamed Kars in honour of the Turkish town’s valiant stand against Russian troops during the Crimean War.

By 1866, Kars was a post village with a population of 200 of the township of North Gower, on the Rideau River, 1.6 kilometres (1 mi) from the line of the Ottawa and Prescott Railway. It contained four general stores, and one steam sawmill, established by A. J. Eastman, in 1852, which had the capacity of turning out 3,000,000 feet (910,000 m) of sawed lumber per annum; a brewery owned by A. J. Eastman & Co., with a production capacity of forty barrels per week; a tannery, two wagon shops, a cooperage, a school, a hotel, two churches - Church of England, frame, erected by John Eastman, Esq, and presented to the Church Society, and the Wesleyan Methodist church, frame. Mails tri-weekly. The Loyal Orange Lodge, No. 520, met in the Orange Hall, on the first Tuesday in each month.

The Rideau River is part of the UNESCO World Heritage Site Rideau Canal. Kars is along the longest uninterrupted section of the River between locks at Long Island in Manotick and Burritts Rapids. As a small community, most residents work in the city of Ottawa. But the village has an automotive garage and formerly had a general store/post office which permanently closed January 1, 2018.

The village had two schools until 2011, when a decision was made to demolish Kars Public School in favour of an expansion of Rideau Valley Middle School. The enlarged school, renamed Kars on the Rideau Public School, is located on nearly 4.9 hectares (12 acres) of land and there are nearby soccer fields.

Kars no longer has a summer fair, but a dog show has continued to run at the former fairgrounds site.

Rideau Valley Air Park is located to the south of the village and is the base of operations for the Rideau Valley Soaring School.
