= David Brown (Canadian politician) =

Canadian politician

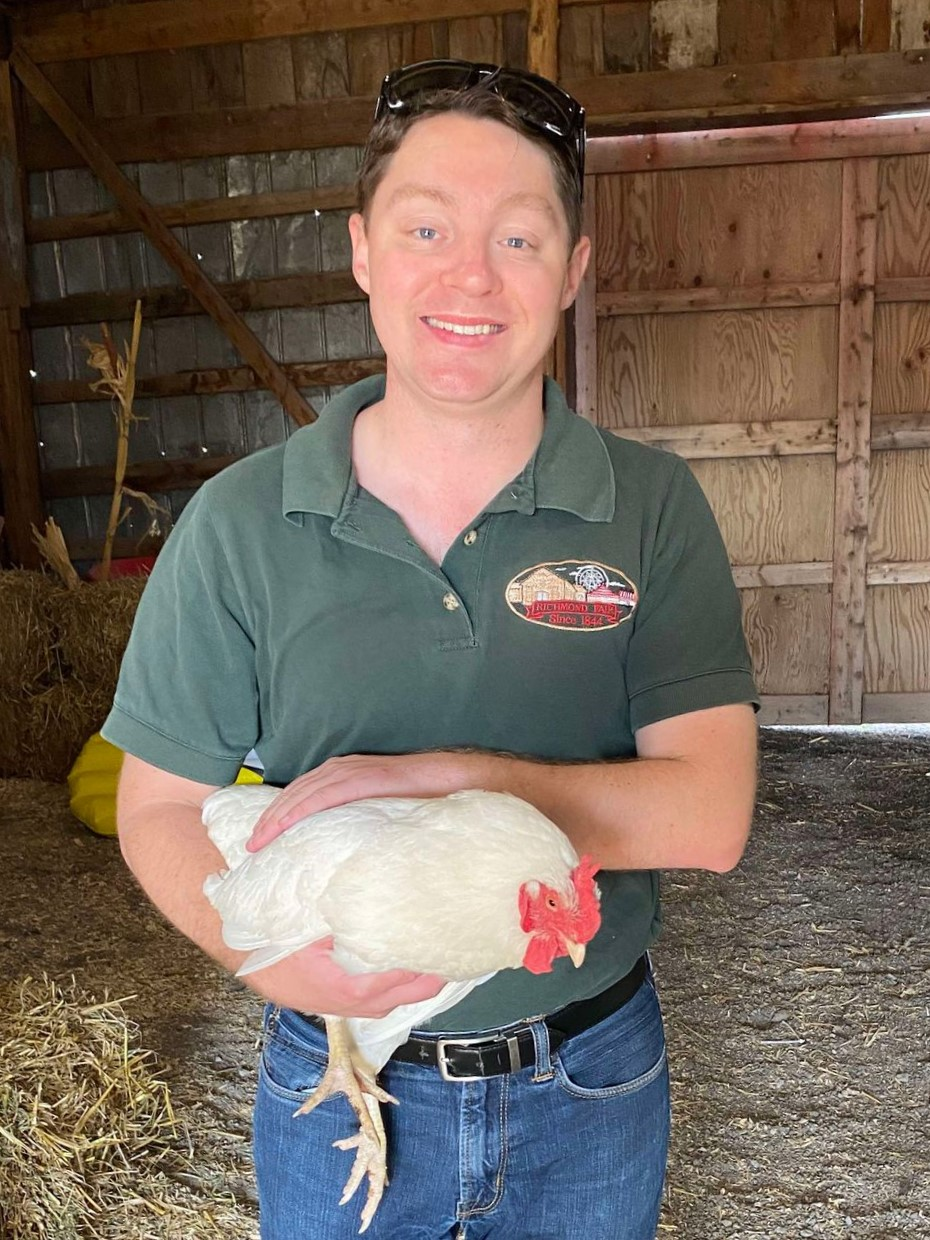
- Brown in 2024.

Ottawa City Councillor
- Incumbent
- Assumed office November 15, 2022
- Preceded by: Scott Moffatt
- Constituency: Rideau-Jock Ward

Personal details
- Born: December 5, 1990 (age 35) Richmond, Ontario
- Website: www.ward21.ca

David Glendon Brown (born December 5, 1990) is a Canadian politician. He is currently the city councillor for Rideau-Jock Ward on Ottawa City Council. He was first elected in the 2022 Ottawa municipal election.

== Early life ==
Brown grew up in Richmond, Ontario, attending Stittsville Public School, Richmond Public School, Goulbourn Middle School and South Carleton High School. He graduated from Kemptville College, and then worked as a dairy farmer for around 10 years. He is a past president of the Richmond Agricultural Society. In 2016, Brown began working as an assistant to the ward's previous councillor Scott Moffatt, before deciding to run against him in the 2018 Ottawa municipal election. He would end up losing to Moffatt by 1,050 votes. After the election, Brown began working for councillor Carol Anne Meehan. In the past, he has also worked for Conservative Member of Parliament (and future Leader of the Opposition) Pierre Poilievre from 2013 to 2015 and Progressive Conservative Member of Provincial Parliament Jeremy Roberts.

== Career ==
Moffatt announced he was not running for re-election in the 2022 Ottawa municipal election, leaving the seat open, and Brown decided to run to replace him. His election priorities included repairing rural roads, upgrading infrastructure in the ward's villages, and "refocusing council's attention on addressing the basic needs of rural residents". He also called for an "'independent budget watchdog' to scrutinize city spending", "figuring out an alternative to [the] waste disposal practice at the Trail Road dump", and to "respect taxpayers". In the election, Brown defeated entrepreneur and educator Leigh-Andrea Brunet by over 4,000 votes, winning nearly two-thirds of the vote.

Following his election, Brown was named Vice-Chair of the Audit Committee, and was named to the Agriculture and Rural Affairs Committee, the Environment and Climate Change Committee and the Committee of Revision. He was also named to the City of Ottawa Superannuation Fund.

Brown was re-elected by acclamation in the 2026 Ottawa municipal election.
