= Manotick =

- Community
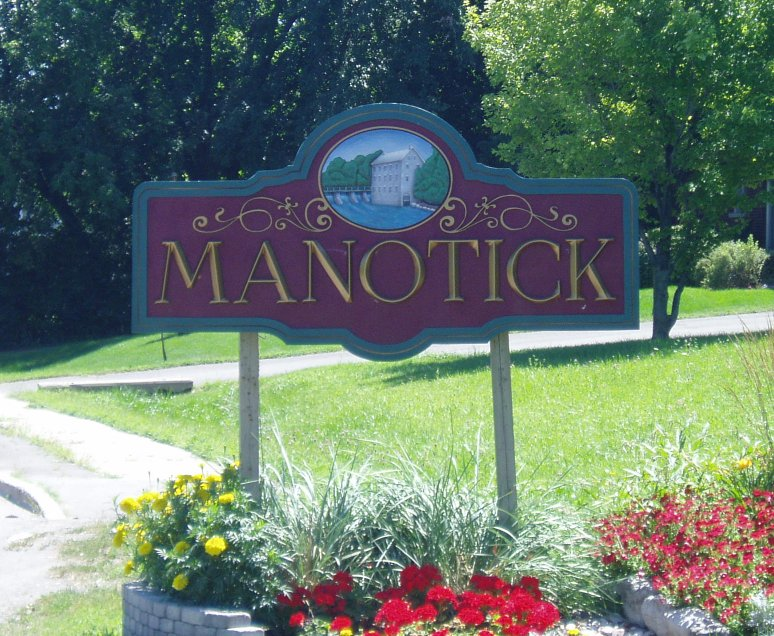

- Location in Ottawa
- Coordinates: 45°13′35″N 75°41′11″W
- Country: Canada
- Province: Ontario
- City: Ottawa
- Established: 1830s
- Incorporated: 1903 (Police Village of Manotick)
- Amalgamation: 1974 (Township of Rideau); 2001 (City of Ottawa)

Government
  - MPs: Bruce Fanjoy
  - MPPs: George Darouze
  - Councillors: David Brown

Area
  - Total: 6.717 km^{2} (2.593 sq mi)
- Elevation: 95 m (312 ft)

Population (2021)
  - Total: 5,315
  - Density: 791.229/km^{2} (2,049.27/sq mi)
- Canada 2021 Census
- Time zone: UTC−5 (Eastern (EST))
  - Summer (DST): UTC−4 (EDT)

Manotick (/ˈmænətɪk/ MAN-ə-tik) is a community in Rideau-Jock Ward in the rural south part of the City of Ottawa, Ontario, Canada. It is a commuter community of the city, located on the Rideau River, immediately south of the suburbs Barrhaven and Riverside South, about 25 km (16 mi) from downtown Ottawa. It was founded by Moss Kent Dickinson in 1864. He named the village 'Manotick', after the Algonquin word for 'island'. It has been part of the City of Ottawa since amalgamation in 2001. Prior to that, it was located in Rideau Township. According to the 2021 Canadian Census, Manotick had a population of 5,315.

== History ==
The village of Long Island Locks was first settled in 1833. In the 1830s, a small settlement formed in the area of the newly constructed Long Island locks on the Rideau Canal, but there was no development in the area of present-day Manotick. A post office was established in 1854.

In 1859, when a bulkhead was constructed across the west branch of the Rideau River, the entrepreneur Moss Kent Dickinson and his partner Joseph Merrill Currier obtained the water rights and constructed a stone mill on the shores of the Rideau River. The flour mill, as well as a carding mill, sawmill and a bung factory, also built by Dickinson, helped spur the development of the settlement. The flour mill was purchased in 1946 by Harry Watson and renamed Watson's Mill. It survives as a working museum, with an operational grist mill.

M. K. Dickinson, Esq., established the Long Island Flouring Mills in 1860, which had the capacity of grinding one hundred barrels of flour per diem. The buildings were substantially built of stone. The saw mill, built by M. K. Dickinson, Esq., employed twelve men and turned out about two million feet of sawn lumber per annum.

Dickinson House, built in 1863, was the first major building in Manotick. It served as a general store, bank, post office, and telegraph office. The Dickinson, Spratt, and Watson families, which owned and operated Watson’s Mill, used the house as their residence from 1870 to 1972. It is currently furnished to give visitors an interpretation of what the space was like when the Dickinson family was in residence. It is included among other architecturally interesting and historically significant buildings in Doors Open Ottawa, alongside Watson's Mill. Open Doors Ottawa sometimes coincides with Dickinson Days, which is Manotick’s annual festival celebrating the Founder of the village.

By 1866, Long Island Locks was a post village with a population of 100 of the township of Gloucester, on the Rideau Canal, seven miles from Gloucester station, on the Ottawa and Prescott railway, and 15 miles from Ottawa. The village contained two general stores and a number of mechanics. There were two church buildings here, one occupied alternately by the Presbyterian congregation and the English Church, and the other by the Wesleyan Methodists.

By 1866, Manotick was a post village with a population of 100 of the township of North Gower, on the Rideau River, five miles from Kelly's station on the Ottawa and Prescott Railway, and 17 miles from Ottawa. There was excellent water power supplied by the Rideau Canal with mails tri-weekly. The Loyal Orange Lodge, No. 477, met in Orange Hall in the village on the first Friday in each month.

The original St. James Anglican Church was built of wood in a Norman style in 1876 on land donated by Moss Kent Dickinson. When a larger church was built in 1985, the original style and appearance, including a Norman tower, the original stained glass windows, plaques and much of the other furnishings were maintained. The church was included with other architecturally interesting and historically-significant buildings in Doors Open Ottawa, held June 2 and 3, 2012.

Manotick was host to a Royal Canadian Navy experimental ionospheric laboratory, the Radio Propagation Laboratory (RPL) on the Prescott Highway. The RPL evolved from Section 6 of the Operational Intelligence Centre (OIC/6) of the navy during World War II. It originally occupied small huts on the Prescott Highway, which from 1944 to 1947 housed a naval high-frequency radio station, operating under the call sign CFF. The station received and transmitted messages between Naval Service Headquarters, Allied Authorities, and ships at sea, and frequently intercepted enemy transmissions. A name plate now marks the site, which is located south of the Central Experimental Farm's Arboretum in Ottawa, between the Rideau Canal and the Prescott Highway.

SunTech Greenhouses LTD, a Hydroponic Greenhouse covering 2.3 acres, was constructed in 1999 on a ninety acre lot. An additional 12,000 square feet was added in the spring of 2001, bringing the greenhouse acreage to 2.5 acres. Since then, the infrastructure was increased by 1.5 acres in 2012, bringing the total greenhouse surface to 4 acres.

As commercial traffic on the Rideau Canal became less important, the population in the village declined. The population in the village rebounded as Manotick came to be viewed by some as a bedroom community for Ottawa and joined the City of Ottawa in 2001.

With perceived overdevelopment of housing in the south of Ottawa, including the rapid growth of Barrhaven, Manotick strives to maintain its character and property values by carefully managing growth and by working closely with developers.

J. Edgar Hoover visited Manotick in the 1920s to see a relative, and Al Capone is said to have had business-related ties to the town.

== Schools ==
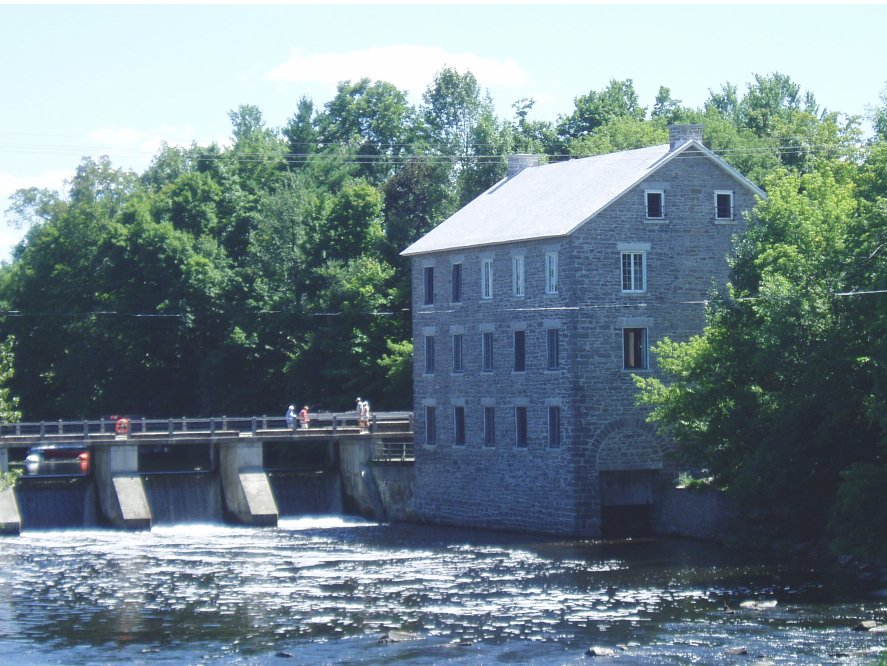
Watson's Mill

- Manotick Public School - The only public elementary school in Manotick, teaches kindergarten to grade 5 in English and French.
- St. Leonard Catholic School - Teaches over 500 kindergarten, primary and junior students in English and French.
- St. Mark Catholic High School - Teaches grades 7-8 and 9-12 in English and French

== Dickinson Days ==
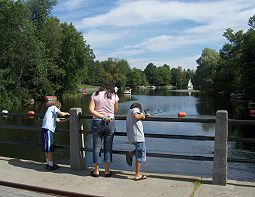
Fishing at Watson's Mill Dam

On the first Friday and Saturday of June, the people of Manotick congregate in the heart of Manotick around Dickinson Square to celebrate Dickinson Days. The festival is named after Moss Kent Dickinson, who operated Watson's Mill (then as Long Island Flouring Mill) and was responsible for founding Manotick. This spring festival, organized by local organizations such as the Kiwanis Club, the BIA, and Watson’s Mill, usually includes activities such as a parade, pancake breakfast, arts and crafts sales, wagon rides, music, dance and drama performances. The celebration coincides with "Pioneer Days", organized by the staff and volunteers of Watson's Mill.

Dickinson Days usually coincides with Doors Open Ottawa, where many local buildings, such as churches and government buildings, are open to the public for one day a year.

== Watson's Mill ==
Watson's Mill is Manotick's most recognized landmark. Its image is used as a symbol for the village. It is the only working museum in the Ottawa area and one of very few operating industrial grist mills in North America. Indeed, Watson's Mill still sells stone-ground whole wheat flour which is made on site.

Moss Kent Dickinson and Joseph Merrill Currier founded the mill as the Long Island Flouring Mills in 1860. It was one of a series of mills constructed in the area using power from the Rideau Canal. It earned its current name when it was purchased by Harry Watson in 1946. Watson was the last owner to operate the mill at an industrial level. When the Rideau Valley Conservation Authority bought the mill in 1972, it was developed into a museum.

The mill is also well known for its ghost story. The legend is that Ann Currier, wife of Joseph Currier, haunts the mill, following her death in a tragic accident there in 1861.

Watson's Mill is open to the public during the summer months and hosts a variety of events, including milling demonstrations every Sunday.

== Mahogany subdivision dispute ==
In 2007, Minto Developments Inc. sought approval to construct a community of approximately 1800 new homes in Manotick. The number was later revised to 1400 in early 2008 through the Development Concept Plan process with the city of Ottawa and numerous public meetings and consultations with residents. The project drew concerns by residents in the area. In the opinion of some local residents, the Minto proposal went against the spirit and letter of the pre-existing Manotick's Secondary Plan. The Secondary Plan for the Village of Manotick was adopted by the City of Ottawa at amalgamation in 2001, providing for growth of only 250 houses by 2020. Residents cited that the project would double Manotick's population and that the current services and infrastructure will be insufficient to handle the population explosion. Some residents were also concerned that Manotick will lose its "small town" character. Villagers want future development direction to be decided by residents and their elected officials, not developers.

On April 24, 2007, the West Manotick Community Association (WMCA) organized a town hall meeting to discuss the issue of Minto's proposed development at the Manotick Arena. The event drew over 2000 citizens concerned about preserving the rural character and scale of Manotick and to ensure any future planning accounts for the rural nature of the village. During 2007 and 2008, the City of Ottawa, the WMCA and Minto all hosted several formal and informal public meetings to demonstrate changes and evolutions to the proposed Development Concept Plans and to encourage public debate. Changes to the plan were made by the developer through the process.

In 2008, the Ottawa City Council rejected Minto's proposed development, stating that Minto's plan did not comply with the City's Official Plan for Manotick, nor its Secondary Plan. Additionally, the City claimed that the proposed development did not match the village's "rural character". Minto appealed the council's decision, sending the matter to the Ontario Municipal Board ("OMB") in a seven-week hearing that ended in late January 2009. The OMB overruled the Ottawa City Council in a "controversial" decision to approve Minto's plans. The City of Ottawa requested a Leave to Appeal the OMB decision, with a hearing that took place on June 25, 2009.

Ultimately, extensive cooperation between Minto and the community resulted in an approved plan for the development, and the construction now is long underway.
