= Rideau Township, Ontario =

Township in Ontario, Canada

Coordinates: 45°06′N 75°45′W

Rideau is an historic township in eastern Ontario, Canada. It is located in the rural south of the City of Ottawa. Its eastern boundary is the Rideau River, its namesake.

The township was created in 1974 after the amalgamation of two other townships: Marlborough, and North Gower, plus Long Island, which was split between Osgoode and Gloucester Townships. In 2001 it was amalgamated into the City of Ottawa.

Former township
Year	Pop.	±%
1981	9,052	—
1986	10,360	+14.4%
1991	11,775	+13.7%
1996	12,444	+5.7%
2001	12,635	+1.5%
2006	12,960	+2.6%
2011	13,171	+1.6%
2016	13,175	+0.0%
2021	14,709	+11.6%

Communities include Manotick, North Gower, Kars and Burritts Rapids

According to the Canada 2001 Census:

- Population: 12,695
- % Change (1996–2001): +2.0
- Dwellings: 4,414
- Area: 408.75 km^{2}
- Density (persons per km^{2}): 31.1

By the 2006 census, Rideau's population had increased to 12,960.
