= Richmond, Ontario =

Richmond
- Community
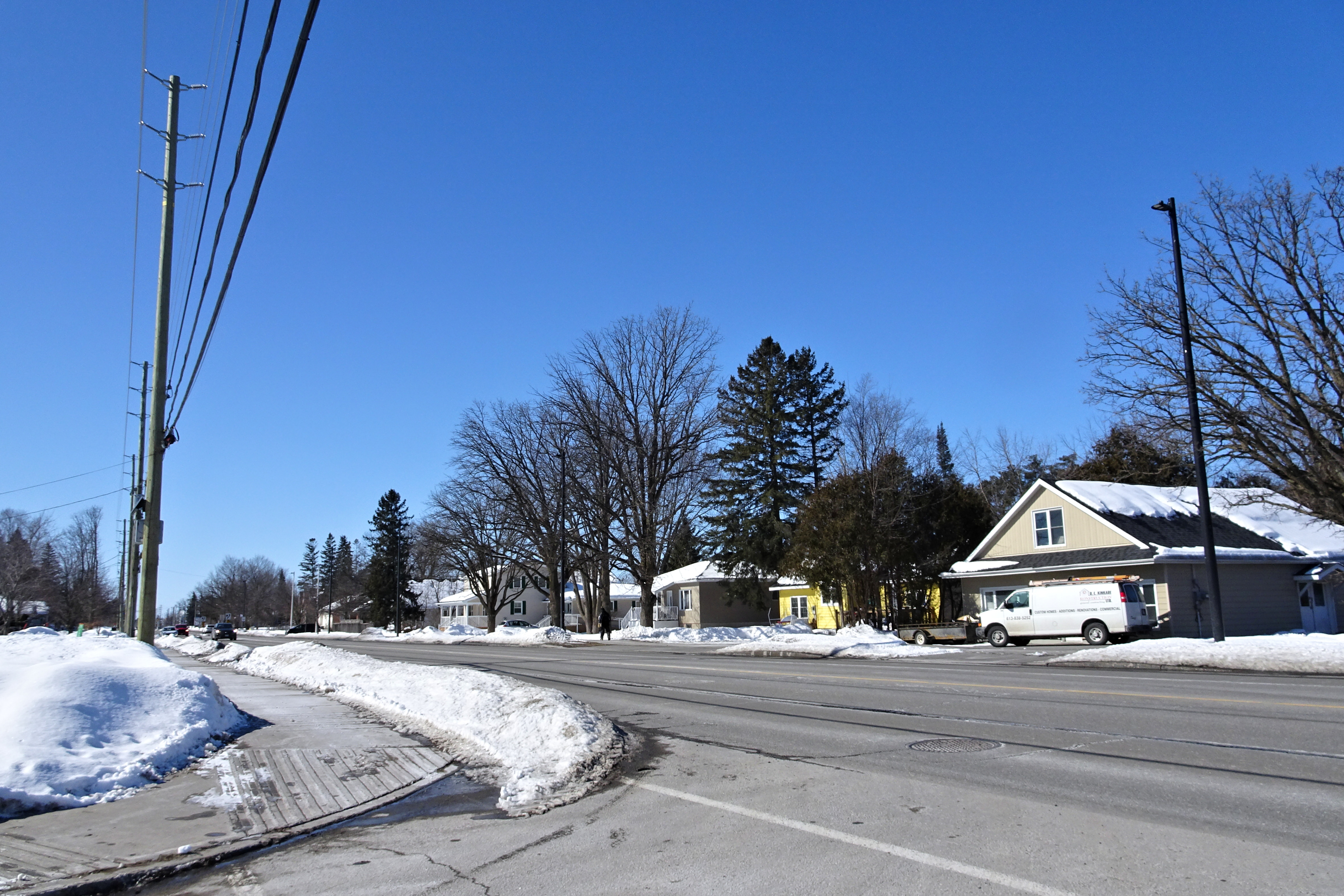

- Location in Ottawa
- Coordinates: 45°11′40″N 75°50′20″W
- Country: Canada
- Province: Ontario
- Municipality: Ottawa
- Established: 1818
- Incorporated: 1850
- Amalgamated: 1974 (Township of Goulbourn); 2001 (City of Ottawa)

Government
  - MP: Bruce Fanjoy
  - MPP: George Darouze
  - City Councillor: David Brown

Area
  - Community: 12.05 km^{2} (4.65 sq mi)
- Elevation: 90 m (300 ft)

Population (2011)
  - Community: 4,482
  - Density: 318.59/km^{2} (825.1/sq mi)
  - Urban: 3,797
- Time zone: UTC-5 (Eastern (EST))
  - Summer (DST): UTC-4 (EDT)
- Postal code span: K0A 2Z0
- Area codes: 613, 343
- Telephone exchange: 838

Richmond is a rural village within the amalgamated City of Ottawa, Ontario, Canada. Founded in 1818, it spans the Jock River, a tributary of the Rideau River. A part of the National Capital Region, Richmond is located 10 kilometres (6.2 mi) southwest of Kanata and immediately south to the community of Stittsville.

== History ==
After the War of 1812, loyal settlers were sought for Upper Canada (now Ontario). The United Empire Loyalists, who, after the American Revolution, had helped to settle areas further south and west in Upper Canada were being regarded with increasing suspicion. Instead, disbanded soldiers were the most immediate loyal settlers for this new era of development.

Richmond was originally laid out for the Government in 1817 by Major George Thew Burke, and settlement commenced as early as 1818. This was a military point for a number of years. Later renamed the Jock River. The Masonic Arms Tavern, his abode on the previous night, was renamed Duke of Richmond Tavern in his honour. Richmond derives its name from the Duke of Richmond.

Richmond was selected by the British Army in 1818 as one of the first military settlements. Others included Perth and Lanark. Named after the Duke of Richmond, who was the newly appointed Governor General of the Canadas, Richmond was laid out in a grid on the north bank of the Jock River (which for a while was renamed the Goodwood after the Duke’s English estate). Richmond was the centre for the administration of lands in the area. Military supervisor, Major Burke, placed mainly Irish soldiers of his 99th Regiment in Goulbourn. Scottish settlers from Perthshire were placed in the adjoining area of northeast Beckwith, while Irish civilians were settled in southeast Beckwith, Goulbourn, and other parts of the neighbouring townships.

In the spring of 1818 the officers and men of 99th were at Quebec, and, in common with those of other regiments, had their choice of a passage home to Ireland or, if they so elected, to remain here in Canada where they would receive free grants of land in the new country to be settled on the Ottawa and Rideau rivers. Thus, in late 1818 (with the help of neighbours in Hull, Quebec assisting in construction) Richmond was born.

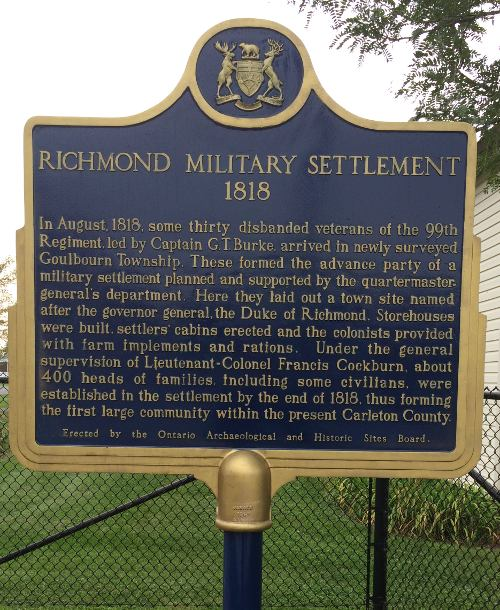
Monument to the "Richmond Military Settlement 1818" on Perth Street (main street) in Richmond, describing its history.

From 1818 to 1822, Richmond was managed by the Settling Branch of Upper Canada's Military Department. Life was dominated by military culture and institutions during these early years. While official plans demonstrate an optimism for its future growth and importance, this never came to pass. By the time the military relinquished control of Richmond in 1822, very few civilians had settled. In the case of Richmond, the rising importance of Bytown and the building of the Rideau Canal several kilometres east of Richmond significantly contributed to its failure to thrive. By 1832, Hamnett Pinhey described the state of Richmond to the Freeholders of Carleton as, "a jail in itself." He goes on to note that, "I have known that place these thirteen years, it was then a rising place, but it has been falling ever since, and is now almost nothing; not a house has been built but many a one has fallen down and still are falling... if you get into it in the Spring, you can't get out till Summer; and if you get into it in the Fall, you must wait till the Winter, and whose fault is it but the Magistrates and Gentry of Richmond; that is to say the Shopkeepers?"

Richmond was incorporated on Goodwood river, in the east corner of the township of Goulbourn, 21 miles from Ottawa City, and 11 miles from the Ottawa river in 1850. For a number of years the trade and business was very active, but by the 1860s appears to have declined. By 1866, with a population of 600, contained several general stores, flouring mills and tannery; a grammar school, building of frame, W. Houghton, master. There were four churches-Church of England, built of stone, Rev. J. C. B. Pettit, rector; Church of Scotland, building of frame, Rev. Wm. P. White, minister; Wesleyan Methodist, building of frame; and the Roman Catholic church, built of stone, Rev. Peter O'Connell, parish priest.

It was annexed by Goulbourn Township in 1974. In 1969, Richmond became part of Regional Municipality of Ottawa-Carleton until 2001. It has been within the City of Ottawa since January 1, 2001. Some residents in Richmond are displeased about the most recent amalgamation into the Ottawa city structure and would like to de-amalgamate along with other areas of rural Carleton County.

=== Richmond Bakery ===
The original Richmond Bakery started in the late 1800s when Sam Wright came from Kemptville and opened a bakery business on Strachan Street. It was sold in 1900 to Sam Wright, who operated the business until 1926.

In 1930, Harold Brown rented a bakeshop and opened the Richmond Bakery on McBean Street which had a wood-fired brick oven, a few utensils and a kerosene lamp for lighting because there was no electricity. All the water was hand pumped from a well and carried to the bakery. Bread sold for 3 cents a loaf to retailers, who in turn sold it for 5 cents and the baker usually worked 16 hours per day. To deliver the bread, Mr. Brown borrowed horses from the local farmers and fed the horses in return. Drivers had to feed the horses at 4 a.m. and usually didn’t finish deliveries until 7 p.m. covering 20–25 miles per day. After being discharged from the RCAF in 1945, Mr. Brown opened another bakery in Richmond on McBean Street. Although it had electricity and trucks to do the deliveries, water still had to be pumped by hand and carried to the bakery.

In 1952, Mr. Brown moved the Richmond Bakery to the corner of McBean and Perth Streets and new equipment was purchased including, gas and oil ovens, revolving trays and a bread steamer. Water was finally pumped into the bakery with an electric pump. At the new location, Mr. Brown added pastries which became one of the attractions of the bakers.

On August 11, 2014, the Richmond Bakery closed its doors suddenly after 75 years in business. The owner stated that challenges he faced trying to find experienced bakers was the reason for closing.

== Today ==
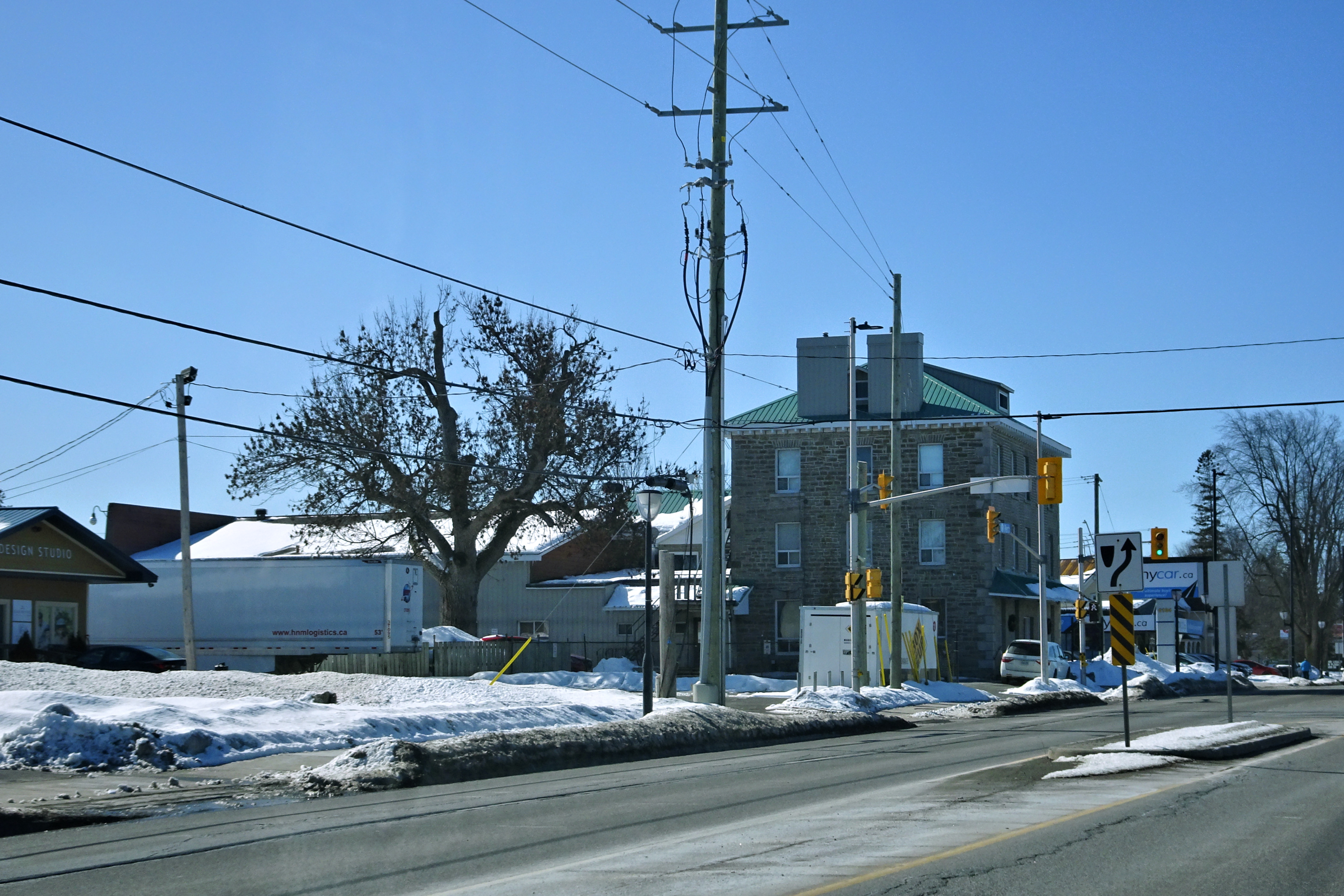
The Old O'Rielly House in Richmond

The mascot is a fox. Richmond has many historical buildings such as St Philip's Church, which is the oldest church in the Catholic Archdiocese of Ottawa, and St John the Baptist Anglican Church, established in 1822 with the first sanctuary built in 1823; the oldest parish in what is now the Anglican Diocese of Ottawa.

Popular sports in Richmond include baseball, soccer, curling, and ice hockey. The Rideau Trail runs through Richmond. The Ottawa-Carleton Catholic School Board runs an elementary school named St. Philip. The public Ottawa-Carleton District School Board operates an elementary school named Richmond Public School and a high school named South Carleton High School. Residents can take RR 10 in travelling to Carleton Place, Perth, or Smith Falls. They may also take the Highway 416, To Prescott or Ottawa. Richmond Road also meanders to downtown Ottawa. Richmond has a Scout Troop. Bus service to Ottawa is through the 283 OC Transpo.

Richmond has a selection of shops and services including a LCBO, banks, drugstore, grocer, and several restaurants.

=== Amalgamation ===
Richmond was amalgamated into the city of Ottawa in 2001.

== Media ==
There are two community newspapers serving Richmond. The "Manotick Messenger" is published every other week and is delivered to every home in Richmond. The Manotick Messenger also operates the www.richmondhub.ca website, a Richmond-based news and information website. "The Stittsville & Richmond Community Voice " is distributed every second week to ALL homes, apartments and businesses by Canada Post. This newspaper was started in August 2019. The Stittsville & Richmond Community Voice details may found at: ottawavoice.ca

== Notable residents ==
- George Seymour Lyon, won the gold medal in golf for Canada at the 1904 Olympics
- Gordon Danby, coinventor with James R. Powell of the Null Flux Superconducting Maglev technology used in the JR–Maglev
- Maria Hill, Early settler and heroine of the War of 1812
- Terry Gray, Ex NHL Hockey Player
