= Burritt =

Burritt may refer to:

== Places ==
- Burritt Township, Winnebago County, Illinois
- Burritts Rapids, Ontario
- Burritt on the Mountain museum and park in Huntsville, Alabama.

== People ==
- Bailey Barton Burritt (1878–1954), public health advocate
- Blackleach Burritt (1744–1794), patriot preacher during the American Revolutionary War
- Carrie T. Burritt (1870-1955), American writer, church worker
- David Burritt, American businessman, CEO of U.S. Steel
- Elihu Burritt (1810–1879), American philanthropist and social activist
- Henry Burritt (1791–1872), farmer and political figure in Upper Canada
- Stephen M. Burritt (1759–1844), early settler in eastern Ontario, Canada

== Things ==
- Burritts Rapids Bridge
