= 2026 Ottawa municipal election =

Election in Ontario, Canada

2026 Ottawa mayoral election
- October 26, 2026
- Turnout: 36.21% (▼7.58%)
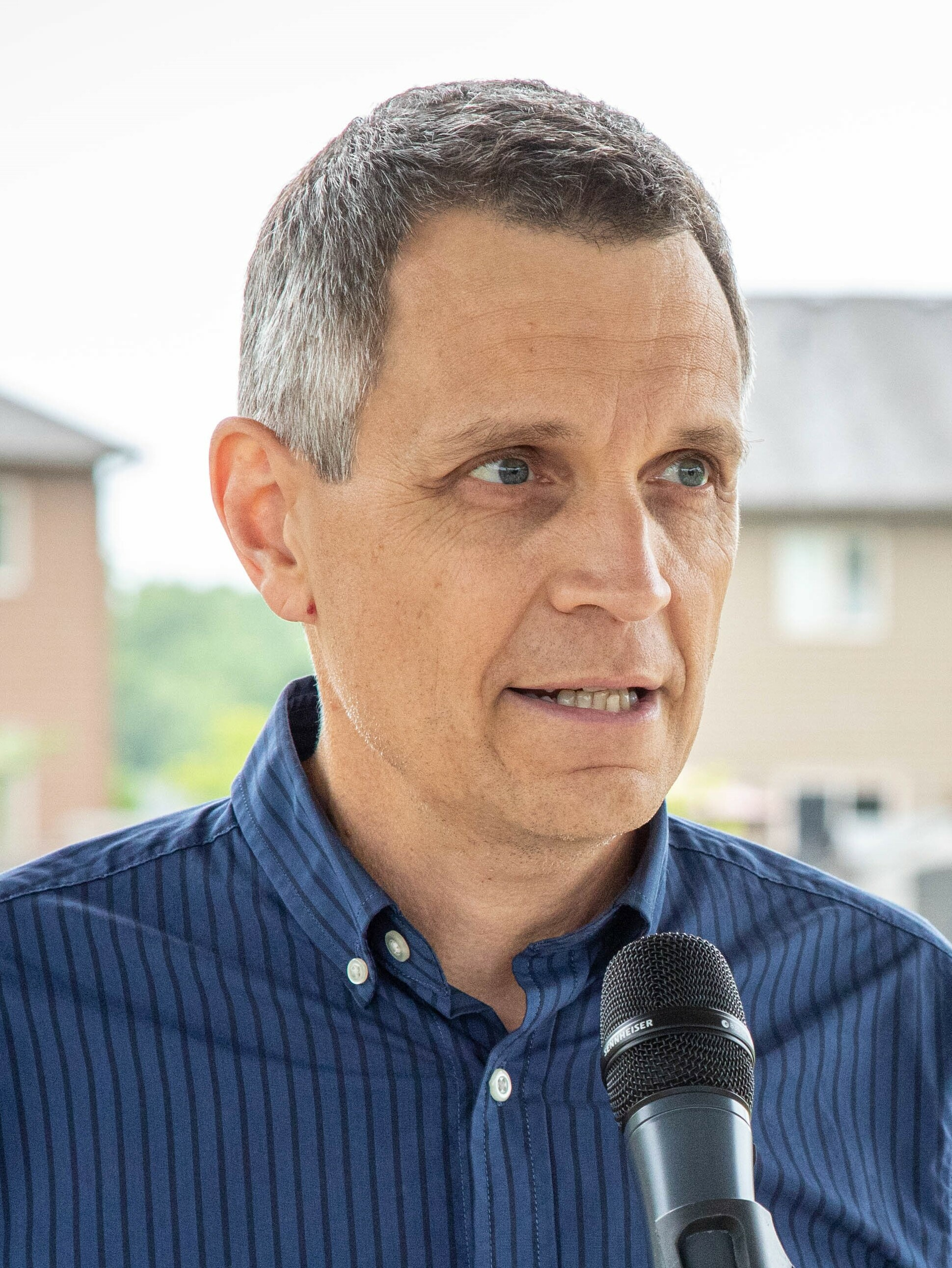

Candidate	Mark Sutcliffe	Jeff Leiper
Popular vote	139,354	105,819
Percentage	44.65%	33.90%
Candidate	Neil Saravanamuttoo	Alex Lawson
Popular vote	34,463	23,605
Percentage	11.04%	7.56%
- Map of Ottawa City Council wards
mayor before election
Mark Sutcliffe
Elected mayor
Mark Sutcliffe

The 2026 Ottawa municipal election was held on October 26, 2026, to elect a mayor, city councillors, and trustees to the English and French public school boards and the English and French Catholic school boards in Ottawa, Ontario, Canada.

Candidate nominations opened on May 1 and closed on August 21. The election was held on October 26 as a part of the 2026 Ontario municipal elections.

== Background ==
As mayor, Mark Sutcliffe has criticized both provincial (Ford ministry) and federal (Trudeau and Carney ministries) for "short-changing" the City's funding, particularly for transit. Sutcliffe supported Lansdowne 2.0, a controversial project to redevelop Lansdowne Park, a facility owned by the City of Ottawa. The project is expected to cost $418.8 million with the City of Ottawa paying a net cost of $130 million. This project is planned to fix the north-side stands in TD Place, reconstruct the 57-year old TD Place Arena, build a new event centre adjacent to the stadium for concerts and other activities, and build two new residential towers while producing $14.4 million for affordable housing. The planned reduction in the capacity of the arena (from 8,268 to 5,500 for hockey) has resulted in the Professional Women's Hockey League stating that the Ottawa Charge will no longer play in the arena, and instead play at the Canadian Tire Centre for the 2026–27 season.

=== Incumbents not running for re-election ===
Incumbent	Position	Ward/Zone	Date announced	New office holder
Jeff Leiper	Councillor	Kitchissippi	June 25, 2025	TBD
Glen Gower	Councillor	Stittsville	February 22, 2026	TBD
Lynn Scott	Trustee	Zone 1 (OCDSB)	N/A (did not file)	TBD
Donna Blackburn	Trustee	Zone 3 (OCDSB)	July 6, 2026	TBD
Suzanne Nash	Trustee	Zone 4 (OCDSB)	N/A (did not file)	TBD
Amanda Presley	Trustee	Zone 5 (OCDSB)	N/A (did not file)	TBD
Lyra Evans	Trustee	Zone 6 (OCDSB)	May 4, 2026	TBD
Donna Dickson	Trustee	Zone 8 (OCDSB)	May 6, 2026	TBD
Matthew Lee	Trustee	Zone 11 (OCDSB)	N/A (did not file)	TBD
Cathryne Milburn	Trustee	Zone 12 (OCDSB)	May 1, 2026	TBD
Olivier Tremblay-Venneri	Trustee	Zone 5 (CECCE)	July 31, 2026	TBD
Denis Forget	Trustee	Zone 6 (CECCE)	N/A (did not file)	TBD
Monique Briand	Trustee	Zone 10 (CECCE)	N/A (did not file)	TBD
Philippe Landry	Trustee	Zone 7 (CEPEO)	N/A (did not file)	TBD
Sonia Boudreault	Trustee	Zone 10 (CEPEO)	N/A (did not file)	TBD

=== Issues ===
An October 2025 poll carried out by Liaison Strategies (sample size 800) found that the top issue for Ottawans in the next election were affordable housing (20%) followed by crime (19%), transit (18%), and homelessness (15%).

A January 2026 poll commissioned by the Ottawa Real Estate Board (sample size 1000) found that the top issues in the upcoming election were the cost of living (37%), housing affordability (19%), and public transit reliability (11%). A majority of respondents thought that candidates should campaign on the cost of living as a high-priority issue.

Declared candidates Jeff Leiper and Alex Lawson have criticized the incumbent mayor for overseeing a decline in the quality of city services.

=== Voting Alignment with Mayor ===
The table listed below is the alignment each councillor has to the Mayor, based on recorded votes from minutes from City Council meetings, and major committees.

Incumbent	Ward	Alignment	First Elected/Previously Elected	Running for re-election (Y/N)
Shawn Menard	Capital	35%	2018	Yes
Sean Devine	Knoxdale-Merivale	38%	2022	Yes
Ariel Troster	Somerset	38%	2022	Yes
Jessica Bradley	Gloucester-Southgate	40%	2022	Yes
Theresa Kavanagh	Bay	40%	2018	Yes
Jeff Leiper	Kitchissippi	41%	2014	No
Rawlson King	Rideau-Rockcliffe	45%	2019	Yes
Laine Johnson	College	48%	2022	Yes
Stéphanie Plante	Rideau-Vanier	58%	2022	Yes
Riley Brockington	River	63%	2014	Yes
Marty Carr	Alta Vista	65%	2022	Yes
Wilson Lo	Barrhaven East	78%	2022	Yes
Matthew Luloff	Orléans East-Cumberland	79%	2018	Yes
Catherine Kitts	Orléans South-Navan	84%	2020	Yes
Clarke Kelly	West Carleton-March	85%	2022	Yes
David Hill	Barrhaven West	85%	2022	Yes
David Brown	Rideau-Jock	86%	2022	Yes
Allan Hubley	Kanata South	87%	2010	Yes
Glen Gower	Stittsville	88%	2018	No
Isabelle Skalski	Osgoode	88%	2025	Yes
Steve Desroches	Riverside South-Findlay Creek	88%	2006, 2022	Yes
Tim Tierney	Beacon Hill-Cyrville	89%	2010	Yes
Cathy Curry	Kanata North	90%	2021	Yes
Laura Dudas	Orléans West-Innes	90%	2018	Yes

== Mayoral candidates ==
=== Candidates ===
==== Registered candidates ====
===== Queen Divine Priya Amber Bakshi =====
Candidacy registered: August 20, 2026

===== Zed Chebib =====
Zed Chebib, 71, is a Lebanese-born Canadian limousine driver and police reform advocate who is most known for being deported from Australia despite having resided in the country with his family for over a decade. He ran for mayor in 2022.

Candidacy registered: June 8, 2026

===== Bernard Couchman =====
Bernard Couchman, 47, is a businessman and perennial candidate. He ran for mayor in the 2014, 2018 and 2022 elections.

Candidacy registered: August 21, 2026

===== Suraj Harish =====
Suraj Harish, 77, is a civil engineer and former senior project manager with the city and the with the Regional Municipality of Ottawa-Carleton. He previously ran for city council in Kanata South Ward in the 2006 municipal election.

Candidacy registered: August 5, 2026
Campaign website: surajharishformayor.ca
Campaign slogan: A former city employee is back to serve the community.

===== Alex Lawson =====
Alex Lawson, 38, is a home builder, who owns a local framing company called Capital Framing. He was also briefly a lobbyist with Political Intelligence from 2024 to 2026. He lives in Dunrobin, and grew up in Heron Gate. He previously served on the board of the Kanata—Carleton Conservative Association. His campaign team includes his half brother, Emrys Graefe, deputy campaign manager for the Conservatives in the 2015 federal election, Quito Maggi, CEO of Mainstreet Research, and previously included Ontario Proud founder Jeff Ballingall, Fred DeLorey, Conservative campaign manager during the 2021 federal election. Lawson stated he voted for Sutcliffe in the last election, but says city services have declined. Lawson has been criticized for his support of the 2022 Freedom Convoy, including liking a reply to one of his social media posts he made during the Freedom Convoy occupation, which stated "we need a revolution", with Lawson replying it's only "a start". He also said he delivered portable toilets to the convoy, which he said went "too far," stating that he delivered the toilets in order to dissuade protesters from disposing their waste on the streets.

Candidacy announced: January 23, 2026
Candidacy registered: May 1, 2026
Campaign website: votealex.ca
Campaign slogan: Ottawa Deserves Better
Campaign slogan (French): Ottawa mérite mieux

===== Jeff Leiper =====
Jeff Leiper, 56, is the incumbent city councillor for Kitchissippi Ward, having served in the position since 2014. Leiper has generally been described as a progressive during his time on city council. Leiper stated he was concerned about inadequate city services, such as lack of sidewalk maintenance, delays in garbage collection, and especially the city's poor transit network. Leiper noted budget disputes with the incumbent mayor – he thought the city was not putting enough funding towards municipal services – and opposed cutting train service frequencies.

Candidacy announced: July 24, 2025
Candidacy registered: May 1, 2026
Campaign website: leiper2026.ca
Campaign slogan: A City That Works
Campaign slogan (French): Une ville qui fonctionne bien

===== Geoff Nicholas =====
Geoffrey Nicholas Griplas, 48, previously ran for city council in Orléans Ward in the 2018 Ottawa municipal election. On September 15, 2026, he was charged for making death threats against mayor Sutcliffe and against Ontario Premier Doug Ford.

Candidacy registered: August 21, 2026

===== Josh Rachlis =====
Josh Rachlis, 53, is an actor, cartoonist, singer/songwriter, screenwriter, stand-up comedian, radio personality, filmmaker, and advertising copywriter.

He was an independent candidate in Ottawa Centre in the 2025 Ontario general election. He was also the Green Party of Ontario candidate for Eglinton—Lawrence in the 2011 Ontario general election and in St. Paul's in 2014. He also was the Green Party of Canada candidate in Thornhill in 2015 and 2019.

Candidacy registered: August 21, 2026

===== Neil Saravanamuttoo =====
Neil Saravanamuttoo, 58, is an economist, public servant, podcaster, and community organizer. He served as a chief economist at the G20 Global Infrastructure Hub until 2021. He was born in Bristol, England, and his father Herb grew up in Sri Lanka, and moved to Canada from the UK to work on the Avro Arrow. Neil grew up in Carlingwood, and attended Carleton University where he studied economics. He and his wife later settled in the Glebe, and worked for JetForm before working for the Department of Finance in the 2000s. He served as an economic advisor to Catherine McKenney in the 2022 mayoral election. He co-founded CitySHAPES, a nonprofit organization focusing on housing, homelessness, transportation, climate change and municipal governance.

Candidacy registered: May 1, 2026
Campaign website: neilformayor.ca
Campaign slogan: A Better Ottawa. By Us. For Us.
Campaign slogan (French): Un meilleur Ottawa. Par nous. Pour nous.

===== Ali Shayvard =====
Ali Shayvard, 40, is an OC Transpo employee. Describes himself as a democratic socialist who was inspired by the election of New York City mayor Zohran Mamdani.

Candidacy registered: August 21, 2026
Campaign website: aliforottawa.ca
Campaign slogan: A New Dawn for Ottawa

===== Jacob Solomon =====
Jacob Solomon, 23, is a political science graduate from the University of Ottawa and is now a Realtor. He ran for mayor in the 2022 election.

Candidacy registered: August 21, 2026
Campaign website: https://sites.google.com/view/jacobsolomon/home

===== Mark Sutcliffe =====
Mark Sutcliffe, 57, is the incumbent Mayor of Ottawa, having served in the position since being elected in 2022. Prior to being elected to office, he was an entrepreneur & business consultant, as well as a former local radio, print, & television media personality. Sutcliffe has been described as centrist; an Ottawa Citizen article described his governance style as "middle-of-the-road" but "socially conscious".

Candidacy announced: June 24, 2025
Candidacy registered: May 25, 2026
Campaign website: https://marksutcliffe2026.ca/
Campaign slogan: Building a stronger Ottawa, together.
Campaign slogan (French): Bâtissons ensemble une ville d'Ottawa plus forte.

===== Amjad Ali Syed =====
Candidacy registered: August 21, 2026

===== Peter Westaway =====
Peter Westaway, 63, is a bike repairer and a perennial candidate. He is a single issue candidate focused on reforming the Ottawa Greenbelt. He ran in Knoxdale-Merivale Ward in 2022 and in the 2025 Osgoode Ward by-election. He was also an independent candidate in Nepean in the 2025 Ontario general election.

Candidacy registered: July 15, 2026
Campaign website: cotg.ca/
Campaign slogan: Changing our Greenbelt.

==== Declined ====
- Tim Tierney, incumbent city councillor for Beacon Hill-Cyrville
- Lisa MacLeod, former Progressive Conservative MPP for Nepean—Carleton.

=== Endorsements ===
	Lawson	Leiper	Saravanamuttoo	Sutcliffe
City councillors		Ariel Troster		
Federal politicians				Mona Fortier (LPC); Marie-France Lalonde (LPC); David McGuinty (LPC); Giovanna Mingarelli (LPC); Yasir Naqvi (LPC); Jenna Sudds (LPC)
Provincial politicians		Catherine McKenney (NDP); Chandra Pasma (NDP)		George Darouze (PC)
Former politicians				Allan Higdon; Bob Monette; Brian Coburn; David Pratt; Des Adam; Don Boudria; Eli El-Chantiry; Glenn Brooks; Gord Hunter; Jacquelin Holzman; Jan Harder; Janet Stavinga; Jean Cloutier; Jean Chrétien; Jim Durrell; Jim Watson; John Baird; Katherine Hobbs; Madeleine Meilleur; Marianne Wilkinson; Mark Taylor; Mathieu Fleury; Merle Nicholds; Peter Hume; Phil McNeely; Rainer Bloess; Shad Qadri
Media				
Other				Maude Marquis-Bissonnette

== Polls ==
=== Voting intention ===
==== Table of data ====
Polling firm	Source	Last date of polling	Sample Size	MoE	Alex Lawson	Jeff Leiper	Neil Saravanamuttoo	Mark Sutcliffe	Other	Undecided
Mainstreet Research^{X}	PDF	Oct 16, 2026	638	± 3.9 %	10%^{X}	26%	8%	35%	–	21%
Quorus Consulting Group	HTML	Oct 15, 2026	807	N/A (Note: The poll was conducted online; a comparable sample would have an MoE of ±3.5 pp, 19 times out of 20.)	7%	35%	10%	42%	6%	(DV) (Note: Key: DV – decided voters AV – all voters)
Quorus Consulting Group	HTML	Oct 15, 2026	807	N/A	4%	24%	7%	28%	4%	33%
Nanos Research	HTML	Oct 8, 2026	762	± 3.6 pp	7%	31%	12%	49%	1%	(DV)
Nanos Research	HTML	Oct 8, 2026	762	± 3.6 pp	5%	24%	6%	41%	1%	23%
Abacus Data^{X}	HTML	Sep 30, 2026	1000	N/A (Note: The poll was conducted online; a comparable sample would have an MoE of ±3.1 pp, 19 times out of 20.)	14%	16%	14%	52%^{X}	4%	(DV)
Abacus Data^{X}	HTML	Sep 30, 2026	1000	N/A	10%	12%	11%	39%^{X}	3%	23%
ElectRight*	HTML	Sept 18, 2026	~600	± 4 pp	6%	26%	14%	49%	4%	(DV)
ElectRight*	HTML	Sept 18, 2026	~600	± 4 pp	4%	19%	10%	35%	3%	28%
Liaison Strategies	HTML	July 19, 2026	1000	± 3.1 pp	26%	25%	11%	36%		(DV)
Liaison Strategies	HTML	July 19, 2026	1000	± 3.1 pp	17%	17%	7%	24%		34%
Quorus Consulting Group	HTML	June 23, 2026	400	–	13%	25%	8%	54%	–	(DV)
Quorus Consulting Group	HTML	June 23, 2026	400	–	6%	12%	4%	26%	–	48%
Liaison Strategies	HTML	June 15, 2026	~1000	± 3.1 pp	21%	31%	8%	38%	1%	(DV)
Liaison Strategies	HTML	June 15, 2026	~1000	± 3.1 pp	12%	21%	6%	24%		37%
Liaison Strategies	PDF	May 10, 2026	1,000	± 3.09 pp	16%	36%	5%	42%	2%	(DV)
Liaison Strategies	PDF	May 10, 2026	1,000	± 3.09 pp	9%	21%	3%	25%	1%	41%
Liaison Strategies	HTMLHTML	April 12, 2026	1,000	± 3.09 pp	13%	37%	–	46%	4%	(DV)
Liaison Strategies	HTMLHTML	April 12, 2026	1,000	± 3.09 pp	7%	19%	–	24%	2%	48%

*ElectRight is a voter contact firm that is unaccredited by the Canadian Research Insights Council.

^{X} Indicates an internally commissioned poll and which candidate's campaign commissioned it.

=== Approval ===
Mark Sutcliffe
Polling company	Date	Approve	Disapprove	Not sure	Sample size	Method	Margin of error
Mainstreet Research	14-16 October, 2026	47%	43%	10%	638	Online	±3.9 pp
Liaison Strategies	8–10 May, 2026	41%	49%	10%	1 000	IVR	±3.09 pp
Liaison Strategies	22–23 October, 2025	50%	41%	9%	800	IVR	±3.46 pp

=== Issues ===
Polling company	Date	Housing affordability	Cost of living	Crime	Public transit	Homelessness	Roads	Taxes	Other	Sample size	Method	Margin of error
Mainstreet Research	14-16 October, 2026	30%	—N/a	—N/a	24%	—N/a	—N/a	14%	29%	638	Online	±3.9 pp
Nanos Research	4-8 October, 2026	—N/a	—N/a	—N/a	55%	—N/a	27%	—N/a	10%	762	RDD	±3.6 pp
Abacus Data	10–22 December, 2025	19%	37%	—N/a	11%	10%	—N/a	—N/a	23%	1000		±2.77 pp
Liaison Strategies	22–23 October, 2025	20%	—N/a	19%	18%	15%	—N/a	8%	28%	800	IVR	±3.46 pp

== Debates and forums ==
Debates and forums among candidates for the 2026 Ottawa mayoral election
No.	Date	Location	Host	Language	Key: P Participant A Absent N Non-invitee I Invitee TBD To be determined O Out of race (not registered/withdrawn/disqualified)					References
No.	Date	Location	Host	Language	Sutcliffe	Leiper	Lawson	Saravanamuttoo	Other Candidates	References
1	August 26, 2026	Nepean Sportsplex	CAFES Ottawa and The People's Official Plan Coalition	English	A	P	A	P	P	Complete video of debate
2	September 15, 2026	Westboro	Rogers TV	English	P	P	P	P	P	Complete video of debate
3	September 15, 2026	Carleton University	CKCU-FM	English	A	P	P	P	N	Complete video of debate
4	September 17, 2026	Centretown	CAFES Ottawa	English, French	P	P	P	P	N	Complete video of debate
5	October 1, 2026	University of Ottawa	Ottawa Board of Trade	English	P	P	P	P	N	Complete video of debate
6	October 15, 2026	ByWard Market	CTV Ottawa	English	P	P	P	P	N	Complete video of debate
7	October 15, 2026	Centretown	Centretown Community Association	English	P	P	P	P	N	Complete video of debate
8	October 19, 2026	University of Ottawa	Alliance to End Homelessness Ottawa	English	P	P	P	P	N	Complete video of debate
9	October 21, 2026	Centretown	CBC Ottawa	English	P	P	P	P	N	Complete video of debate

== Mayoral results ==
2026 Ottawa municipal election: Mayor
Candidate	Popular vote			Expenditures
Candidate	Votes	%	±%	Expenditures
Mark Sutcliffe (X)	139,354	44.65	-6.75	
Jeff Leiper	105,819	33.90	–	
Neil Saravanamuttoo	34,463	11.04	–	
Alex Lawson	23,605	7.56	–	
Amjad Ali Syed	1,312	0.42	–	
Queen Divine Priya Amber Bakshi	1,234	0.40	–	
Ali Shayvard	1,016	0.33	–	
Bernard Couchman	925	0.30	+0.15	
Peter Westaway	912	0.29	–	
Jacob Solomon	858	0.27	+0.13	
Geoff Nicholas	799	0.26	–	
Suraj Harish	728	0.23	–	
Josh Rachlis	688	0.22	–	
Zed Chebib	412	0.13	+0.05	
Total valid votes	314,393			
Total rejected, unmarked and declined votes				
Turnout				
Eligible voters	868,248			
Note: Candidate campaign colours are based on the prominent colour used in campaign items (signs, literature, etc.) and are used as a visual differentiation between candidates.
Sources: City of Ottawa

=== Results by ward ===
Results by ward
Ward	Bakshi		Chebib		Couchman		Harish		Lawson		Leiper		Nicholas		Rachlis		Saravanamuttoo		Shayvard		Solomon		Sutcliffe		Syed		Westaway	
Ward	Votes	%	Votes	%	Votes	%	Votes	%	Votes	%	Votes	%	Votes	%	Votes	%	Votes	%	Votes	%	Votes	%	Votes	%	Votes	%	Votes	%
Orléans East-Cumberland	100	0.64	25	0.16	75	0.48	35	0.22	1,462	9.28	4,061	25.79	66	0.42	37	0.23	1,316	8.36	47	0.30	64	0.41	8,303	52.73	89	0.57	66	0.42
Orléans West-Innes	66	0.44	15	0.10	69	0.46	27	0.18	1,166	7.80	4,188	28.03	48	0.32	31	0.21	1,427	9.55	48	0.32	38	0.25	7,736	51.77	40	0.27	44	0.29
Barrhaven West	60	0.44	20	0.15	27	0.20	64	0.47	1,187	8.64	3,374	24.57	32	0.23	28	0.20	1,964	14.30	49	0.36	36	0.26	6,777	49.35	77	0.56	37	0.27
Kanata North	44	0.40	13	0.12	15	0.14	35	0.32	842	7.69	2,799	25.58	8	0.07	22	0.20	1,481	13.53	17	0.16	24	0.22	5,578	50.97	42	0.38	24	0.22
West Carleton-March	26	0.32	5	0.06	9	0.11	4	0.05	1,180	14.34	1,528	18.57	27	0.33	11	0.13	609	7.40	13	0.16	19	0.23	4,767	57.92	9	0.11	23	0.28
Stittsville	46	0.36	12	0.09	26	0.20	75	0.58	1,210	9.39	3,031	23.51	42	0.33	24	0.19	1,578	12.24	32	0.25	38	0.29	6,667	51.72	54	0.42	56	0.43
Bay	55	0.40	18	0.13	40	0.29	36	0.26	863	6.26	5,458	39.57	34	0.25	37	0.27	1,534	11.12	46	0.33	43	0.31	5,535	40.12	44	0.32	52	0.38
College	55	0.37	11	0.07	29	0.19	26	0.17	1,086	7.28	5,524	37.03	36	0.24	37	0.25	1,405	9.42	35	0.23	29	0.19	6,568	44.03	34	0.23	41	0.27
Knoxdale-Merivale	47	0.44	9	0.08	26	0.24	17	0.16	928	8.59	3,522	32.60	31	0.29	29	0.27	1,043	9.65	35	0.32	43	0.40	4,990	46.19	38	0.35	45	0.42
Gloucester-Southgate	48	0.51	35	0.37	39	0.42	42	0.45	714	7.65	2,986	31.99	38	0.41	22	0.24	1,203	12.89	66	0.71	29	0.31	3,967	42.50	111	1.19	35	0.37
Beacon Hill-Cyrville	69	0.79	16	0.18	52	0.59	13	0.15	670	7.63	2,907	33.11	34	0.39	34	0.39	847	9.65	51	0.58	43	0.49	3,973	45.25	37	0.42	34	0.39
Rideau-Vanier	49	0.45	14	0.13	77	0.71	23	0.21	631	5.86	5,186	48.15	34	0.32	21	0.19	1,213	11.26	50	0.46	50	0.46	3,350	31.10	45	0.42	28	0.26
Rideau-Rockcliffe	48	0.50	16	0.17	55	0.58	19	0.20	585	6.14	3,580	37.60	27	0.28	21	0.22	1,068	11.22	28	0.29	43	0.45	3,962	41.61	32	0.34	38	0.40
Somerset	65	0.48	16	0.12	25	0.18	13	0.10	644	4.74	8,508	62.63	29	0.21	28	0.21	1,453	10.70	39	0.29	26	0.19	2,683	19.75	28	0.21	28	0.21
Kitchissippi	23	0.15	7	0.05	12	0.08	14	0.09	530	3.52	8,504	56.45	17	0.11	16	0.11	1,352	8.97	12	0.08	16	0.11	4,520	30.00	18	0.12	24	0.16
River	30	0.27	17	0.15	30	0.27	17	0.15	730	6.47	4,439	39.36	19	0.17	39	0.35	1,271	11.27	47	0.42	28	0.25	4,543	40.29	37	0.33	30	0.27
Capital	28	0.21	9	0.07	24	0.18	8	0.06	541	4.02	6,925	51.43	16	0.12	27	0.20	2,213	16.43	25	0.19	18	0.13	3,596	26.70	18	0.13	18	0.13
Alta Vista	45	0.38	40	0.34	44	0.37	22	0.19	721	6.12	4,064	34.48	36	0.31	23	0.20	1,480	12.56	54	0.46	43	0.36	5,111	43.36	60	0.51	44	0.37
Orléans South-Navan	59	0.51	25	0.22	66	0.57	30	0.26	1,006	8.70	2922	25.27	43	0.37	21	0.18	1,207	10.44	35	0.30	38	0.33	5,971	51.63	104	0.90	38	0.33
Osgoode	17	0.23	4	0.05	26	0.35	5	0.07	938	12.74	1,304	17.72	9	0.12	12	0.16	604	8.21	9	0.12	10	0.14	4,399	59.77	6	0.08	17	0.23
Rideau-Jock	12	0.15	2	0.02	6	0.07	7	0.09	999	12.46	1,505	18.77	12	0.15	13	0.16	783	9.77	11	0.14	9	0.11	4,632	57.78	14	0.17	11	0.14
Riverside South-Findlay Creek	29	0.34	12	0.14	19	0.22	28	0.32	708	8.20	2,406	27.85	17	0.20	14	0.16	1,281	14.83	42	0.49	25	0.29	3,980	46.08	57	0.66	20	0.23
Kanata South	66	0.45	9	0.06	32	0.22	52	0.35	1,412	9.63	4,541	30.96	43	0.29	28	0.19	1,448	9.87	54	0.37	37	0.25	6,876	46.87	37	0.25	34	0.23
Barrhaven East	42	0.36	19	0.16	24	0.20	18	0.15	1,104	9.36	3,349	28.38	24	0.20	25	0.21	1,698	14.39	57	0.48	29	0.25	5,254	44.53	118	1.00	39	0.33
Special Advance Voting (Note: Voters who vote in the special advance voting period can vote across the city and are thus labelled in their own category.)	105	0.34	43	0.14	78	0.26	98	0.32	1,748	5.73	9,208	30.20	77	0.25	88	0.29	2,985	9.79	114	0.37	80	0.26	15,616	51.22	163	0.53	86	0.28
Total	1,234	0.40	412	0.13	925	0.30	728	0.23	23,605	7.56	105,819	33.90	799	0.26	688	0.22	34,463	11.04	1,016	0.33	858	0.27	139,354	44.65	1,312	0.42	912	0.29

== City Council ==
For the first time since the 2003 election, there are candidates who will be elected by acclamation, Riley Brockington in River Ward and David Brown in Rideau-Jock Ward.

Map of Ottawa's 24 wards used in this election.: 1. Orléans East-Cumberland Ward; 2. Orléans West-Innes Ward; 3. Barrhaven West Ward; 4. Kanata North Ward; 5. West Carleton-March Ward; 6. Stittsville Ward; 7. Bay Ward; 8. College Ward; 9. Knoxdale-Merivale Ward; 10. Gloucester-Southgate Ward; 11. Beacon Hill-Cyrville Ward; 12. Rideau-Vanier Ward; 13. Rideau-Rockcliffe Ward; 14. Somerset Ward; 15. Kitchissippi Ward; 16. River Ward; 17. Capital Ward; 18. Alta Vista Ward; 19. Orléans South-Navan Ward; 20. Osgoode Ward; 21. Rideau-Jock Ward; 22. Riverside South-Findlay Creek Ward; 23. Kanata South Ward; 24. Barrhaven East Ward

=== Ward candidates ===
==== Orléans East-Cumberland Ward ====
Incumbent city councillor Matthew Luloff was re-elected in 2022 with 74.17% of the vote. Luloff was initially slated to run as a candidate for the Conservative Party of Canada in the 2025 federal election, but withdrew due to being charged with impaired driving. He will be seeking re-election.

Nominated Candidates

- Barbara Daniela Gandolfo, designer, educator, "well known in east-end Liberal circles".
- Sherif Rizk, civil fraud and personal injury lawyer
- Bob Bell, Green Party of Ontario candidate in Ottawa—Orléans in the 2014 Ontario general election
- Tammie Trellert, board executive at Treble Victor Group
- Matt Luloff, incumbent city councillor
- Mazhar Choudhry, computer scientist and independent candidate in Orléans in the 2025 Canadian federal election
- Yvette Ashiri, Orléans South-Navan Ward candidate in 2022 and 2020 Cumberland Ward by-election candidate

2026 Ottawa municipal election: Orléans East-Cumberland
Candidate	Popular vote			Expenditures
Candidate	Votes	%	±%	Expenditures
Matt Luloff (X)	6,337	36.41	-37.76	
Bob Bell	4,308	24.75	–	
Barbara Daniela Gandolfo	2,578	14.81	–	
Yvette Ashiri	1,713	9.84	–	
Sherif Rizk	1,019	5.85	–	
Mazhar Choudhry	776	4.46	–	
Tammie Trellert	674	3.87	–	
Total valid votes	17,557			
Total rejected, unmarked and declined votes				
Turnout		39.84		
Eligible voters	44,068			
Note: Candidate campaign colours are based on the prominent colour used in campaign items (signs, literature, etc.) and are used as a visual differentiation between candidates.

==== Orléans West-Innes Ward ====
Incumbent city councillor Laura Dudas was re-elected in 2022 with 71.43% of the vote. She will be seeking re-election.

Nominated Candidates

- Laura Dudas, incumbent councillor
- Jenna Jessop, Junior Program Officer at Canada Border Services Agency
- David Purchase, realtor

2026 Ottawa municipal election: Orléans West-Innes
Candidate	Popular vote			Expenditures
Candidate	Votes	%	±%	Expenditures
Laura Dudas (X)	10,573	65.56		
David Purchase	3,151	19.45		
Jenna Jessop	2,403	14.90		
Total valid votes	16,274			
Total rejected, unmarked and declined votes				
Turnout		40.65		
Eligible voters	40,033			
Note: Candidate campaign colours are based on the prominent colour used in campaign items (signs, literature, etc.) and are used as a visual differentiation between candidates.

==== Barrhaven West Ward ====
Incumbent city councillor David Hill was elected in 2022 with 43.97% of the vote. He will be seeking re-election.

Nominated Candidates

- David Hill, incumbent councillor
- Donna Blackburn, OCDSB Trustee for Zone 3 - Barrhaven West/Barrhaven East
- Jeff Balys, realtor

2026 Ottawa municipal election: Barrhaven West
Candidate	Popular vote			Expenditures
Candidate	Votes	%	±%	Expenditures
David Hill (X)	11,672	70.82		
Jeff Balys	2,413	14.64		
Donna Blackburn	2,396	14.54		
Total valid votes	16,705			
Total rejected, unmarked and declined votes				
Turnout	37.83			
Eligible voters	44,156			
Note: Candidate campaign colours are based on the prominent colour used in campaign items (signs, literature, etc.) and are used as a visual differentiation between candidates.

==== Kanata North Ward ====
Incumbent city councillor Cathy Curry was elected to a full term in 2022 with 76.75% of the vote, having been appointed to the seat in 2021 following the resignation of her predecessor, Jenna Sudds. She will be seeking re-election.

Nominated Candidates

- Cathy Curry, incumbent councillor
- James Murchison, policy analyst for Strong Towns Ottawa
- Rob Millan, founder of Senatus Group, an international trade advisory firm

2026 Ottawa municipal election: Kanata North
Candidate	Popular vote			Expenditures
Candidate	Votes	%	±%	Expenditures
Cathy Curry (X)	9,084	73.67		
Rob Millan	2,401	19.47		
James Murchison	846	6.86		
Total valid votes	12,598			
Total rejected, unmarked and declined votes				
Turnout		35.98		
Eligible voters	35,011			
Note: Candidate campaign colours are based on the prominent colour used in campaign items (signs, literature, etc.) and are used as a visual differentiation between candidates.

==== West Carleton-March Ward ====
Incumbent city councillor Clarke Kelly was elected in 2022 with 27.40% of the vote. He will be seeking re-election.

Nominated candidates

- Christine Harrison, psychotherapist.
- Clarke Kelly, incumbent city councillor
- Dylan Nosé, construction business owner

2026 Ottawa municipal election: West Carleton-March
Candidate	Popular vote			Expenditures
Candidate	Votes	%	±%	Expenditures
Clarke Kelly (X)	5,239	60.26		
Christine Harrison	3,095	35.60		
Dylan Nosé	360	4.14		
Total valid votes	8,754			
Total rejected, unmarked and declined votes				
Turnout		39.10		
Eligible voters	22,389			
Note: Candidate campaign colours are based on the prominent colour used in campaign items (signs, literature, etc.) and are used as a visual differentiation between candidates.

==== Stittsville Ward ====
Incumbent city councillor Glen Gower was re-elected in 2022 with 58.67% of the vote. He announced he will not be seeking re-election.

Nominated candidates

- Nagmani Sharma, software engineer, ran in West Carleton-March Ward in 2022
- Chelsea Walton, Program and Project Management Officer at the City of Ottawa, former Councillor's Assistant to Laine Johnson
- Sheetal Narwal, cybersecurity professional
- Tanya Hein, paralegal, former president of the Stittsville Village Association, ran in this ward in 2022
- Theresa Qadri, chair of the Stittsville Food Bank, wife of former Stittsville Councillor Shad Qadri, Liberal Party of Ontario candidate in Carleton in the 2018 Ontario general election
- Kevin Hua, federal NDP candidate in Carleton in 2019 and 2021, ran in this ward in 2022
- Marie-Ange Yindaki Ahinful, founder, president, and CEO of Leading Ladies Canada
- Paul Meek, President, Owner and Founder of Kichesippi Beer Company
- Devin Michael Fitzgerald O'Brien, hobby shop owner, son of author Lawrence P. O'Brien (no relation to Ottawa Mayor Larry O’Brien)

Withdrawn candidates

- Adriana Galan, president of the Stittsville Business Association, dropped out July 15.

2026 Ottawa municipal election: Stittsville
Candidate	Popular vote			Expenditures
Candidate	Votes	%	±%	Expenditures
Chelsea Walton	6,847	43.72		
Theresa Qadri	2,332	14.89		
Kevin Hua	2,153	13.75		
Paul Meek	1,538	9.82		
Sheetal Narwal	1,203	7.68		
Tanya Hein	721	4.60		
Nagmani Sharma	380	2.43		
Marie-Ange Yindaki Ahinful	274	1.75		
Devin Michael Fitzgerald O'Brien	212	1.35		
Total valid votes	15,741			
Total rejected, unmarked and declined votes				
Turnout		39.27		
Eligible voters	40,079			
Note: Candidate campaign colours are based on the prominent colour used in campaign items (signs, literature, etc.) and are used as a visual differentiation between candidates.

==== Bay Ward ====
Incumbent city councillor Theresa Kavanagh was re-elected in 2022 with 82.79% of the vote. She will be seeking re-election.

Nominated Candidates

- Theresa Kavanagh, incumbent councillor
- Spencer Radford, security guard
- Butch Moore, retired firefighter, children's book author, and independent candidate in Ottawa West—Nepean in the 2019 Canadian federal election

2026 Ottawa municipal election: Bay
Candidate	Popular vote			Expenditures
Candidate	Votes	%	±%	Expenditures
Theresa Kavanagh (X)	11,939	82.47		
Spencer Radford	1,443	9.97		
Butch Moore	1,095	7.56		
Total valid votes	14,950			
Total rejected, unmarked and declined votes				
Turnout		38.20		
Eligible voters	31,140			
Note: Candidate campaign colours are based on the prominent colour used in campaign items (signs, literature, etc.) and are used as a visual differentiation between candidates.

==== College Ward ====
Incumbent city councillor Laine Johnson was elected in 2022 with 52.64% of the vote. She will be seeking re-election.

Nominated Candidates

- Laine Johnson, incumbent councillor
- Abakar Malloum, part-time instructor at the University of Ottawa and research coordinator.

2026 Ottawa municipal election: College
Candidate	Popular vote			Expenditures
Candidate	Votes	%	±%	Expenditures
Laine Johnson (X)	14,327	92.00		
Malloum Abakar	1,245	8.00		
Total valid votes	16,111			
Total rejected, unmarked and declined votes				
Turnout		39.09		
Eligible voters	41,211			
Note: Candidate campaign colours are based on the prominent colour used in campaign items (signs, literature, etc.) and are used as a visual differentiation between candidates.

==== Knoxdale-Merivale Ward ====
Incumbent city councillor Sean Devine was elected in 2022 with 39.20% of the vote. He will be seeking re-election.

Nominated candidates

- Cole Fraser Jones, assistant director for information technology at Immigration, Refugees and Citizenship Canada
- Anna Ielo-Tal, analyst at Public Safety Canada
- Sean Devine, incumbent councillor

Withdrawn candidates

- Brandon Ly, parliamentary assistant to Conservative MP Mike Dawson (remained on ballot; withdrew September 1)
- Peter Westaway, candidate for this ward in 2022 and in the 2025 Osgoode Ward by-election on a platform based on the Ottawa Greenbelt; independent candidate in Nepean in the 2025 Ontario general election (running for mayor; withdrew July 15)

2026 Ottawa municipal election: Knoxdale-Merivale
Candidate	Popular vote			Expenditures
Candidate	Votes	%	±%	Expenditures
Sean Devine (X)	7,083	59.19		
Anna Ielo-Tal	3,540	29.58		
Cole Fraser Jones	1,224	10.23		
Brandon Ly (withdrawn)	120	1.00		
Total valid votes	12,223			
Total rejected, unmarked and declined votes				
Turnout		39.61		
Eligible voters	30,861			
Note: Candidate campaign colours are based on the prominent colour used in campaign items (signs, literature, etc.) and are used as a visual differentiation between candidates.

==== Gloucester-Southgate Ward ====
Incumbent city councillor Jessica Bradley was elected in 2022 with 42.24% of the vote. She will be seeking re-election.

Nominated Candidates

- John Redins, disability rights advocate and perennial candidate
- Donna Dickson, Ottawa-Carleton District School Board trustee for Zone 8.
- Jessica Bradley, incumbent city councillor
- Ahmed Rashid, former legal assistant
- Ayub Omar

2026 Ottawa municipal election: Gloucester-Southgate
Candidate	Popular vote			Expenditures
Candidate	Votes	%	±%	Expenditures
Jessica Bradley (X)	7,506	69.31		
Donna Dickson	1,480	13.67		
Ahmed Rashid	1,187	10.96		
John Redins	367	3.39		
Ayub Omar	290	2.68		
Total valid votes	11,122			
Total rejected, unmarked and declined votes				
Turnout		28.49		
Eligible voters	39,036			
Note: Candidate campaign colours are based on the prominent colour used in campaign items (signs, literature, etc.) and are used as a visual differentiation between candidates.

==== Beacon Hill-Cyrville Ward ====
Incumbent city councillor Tim Tierney was re-elected in 2022 with 81.96% of the vote. After briefly considering running for mayor, he announced his intention for re-election.

Nominated candidates

- Cathryne Milburn, OCDSB Trustee for Zone 12 - Orléans West-Innes/Beacon-Hill Cyrville
- Tim Tierney, incumbent city councillor
- Coreen Corcoran, Libertarian Party of Canada candidate in Ottawa—Vanier—Gloucester in the 2015 and 2025 Canadian federal election, Ontario Libertarian Party candidate in Ottawa—Vanier in the 2022 and 2025 Ontario general election. Also ran federally in Ottawa Centre in 2019, and provincially in Nepean—Carleton in 2014

2026 Ottawa municipal election: Beacon Hill-Cyrville
Candidate	Popular vote			Expenditures
Candidate	Votes	%	±%	Expenditures
Tim Tierney (X)	5,978	63.10		
Cathryne Milburn	3,100	32.72		
Coreen Corcoran	396	4.18		
Total valid votes	9,622			
Total rejected, unmarked and declined votes				
Turnout		34.26		
Eligible voters	28,082			
Note: Candidate campaign colours are based on the prominent colour used in campaign items (signs, literature, etc.) and are used as a visual differentiation between candidates.

==== Rideau-Vanier Ward ====
Incumbent city councillor Stéphanie Plante was elected in 2022 with 37.15% of the vote. She will be seeking re-election.

Nominated candidates

- Lyra Evans,Ottawa-Carleton District School Board trustee for Zone 6
- Stéphanie Plante, incumbent city councillor
- Eric Smith
- Brian Paquette, martial-arts instructor, personal trainer and leadership-development coach
- Michael Karl Sewanaku
- Julie Fiala Chartrand, ran in this ward in 2022, artist and provincial Independent candidate for Ottawa—Vanier in the 2020 by-election.

2026 Ottawa municipal election: Rideau-Vanier
Candidate	Popular vote			Expenditures
Candidate	Votes	%	±%	Expenditures
Stéphanie Plante (X)	6,194	53.75		
Lyra Evans	3,791	32.90		
Julie Fiala Chartrand	565	4.90		
Brian Paquette	449	3.90		
Michael Karl Sewanaku	309	2.68		
Eric Smith	216	1.87		
Total valid votes	11,920			
Total rejected, unmarked and declined votes				
Turnout		28.57		
Eligible voters	41,716			
Note: Candidate campaign colours are based on the prominent colour used in campaign items (signs, literature, etc.) and are used as a visual differentiation between candidates.

==== Rideau-Rockcliffe Ward ====
Incumbent city councillor Rawlson King was re-elected in 2022 with 80.14% of the vote. He will be seeking re-election.

Nominated candidates

- Peter Jan Karwacki, candidate for this ward in the 2022 election and 2019 by-election
- Rawlson King, incumbent councillor

2026 Ottawa municipal election: Rideau-Rockcliffe
Candidate	Popular vote			Expenditures
Candidate	Votes	%	±%	Expenditures
Rawlson King (X)	8,181	81.53		
Peter J. Karwacki	1,853	18.47		
Total valid votes	10,545			
Total rejected, unmarked and declined votes				
Turnout		31.44		
Eligible voters	33,545			
Note: Candidate campaign colours are based on the prominent colour used in campaign items (signs, literature, etc.) and are used as a visual differentiation between candidates.

==== Somerset Ward ====
Incumbent city councillor Ariel Troster was elected in 2022 with 61.28% of the vote. She will be seeking re-election.

Nominated candidates

- Robert Dekker, president of the Centretown Community Association, Progressive Conservative Party of Ontario candidate in Ottawa Centre in the 2011 and 2014 Ontario general elections.
- Ariel Troster, incumbent city councillor
- Dillon Anderson, Accounting graduate, placed 15th in the 2025 Battle River—Crowfoot federal by-election
- Michael Tay, Program Manager at the Catholic Centre for Immigrants
- Nicholas Gollé, Canada Revenue Agency employee

2026 Ottawa municipal election: Somerset
Candidate	Popular vote			Expenditures
Candidate	Votes	%	±%	Expenditures
Ariel Troster (X)	9,061	61.89		
Robert Dekker	2,818	19.25		
Michael Tay	2,019	13.79		
Nicholas Gollé	430	2.94		
Dillon Anderson	313	2.14		
Total valid votes	15,162			
Total rejected, unmarked and declined votes				
Turnout		38.57		
Eligible voters	39,309			
Note: Candidate campaign colours are based on the prominent colour used in campaign items (signs, literature, etc.) and are used as a visual differentiation between candidates.

==== Kitchissippi Ward ====
Incumbent city councillor Jeff Leiper was re-elected in 2022 with 71.97% of the vote. He has announced that he will not be seeking re-election in order to run for Mayor.

Nominated candidates

- Joanne Chianello, former journalist for the Ottawa Citizen and CBC Ottawa
- Subhir Uppal, Entrepreneur, Ethics Instructor & Board Member
- Brian Innes, executive director at Soy Canada
- Xavier Commerford

Withdrawn candidates

- Michelle Groulx, chief advocate for the Ottawa Coalition of Business Improvement Areas, withdrew August 10.

2026 Ottawa municipal election: Kitchissippi
Candidate	Popular vote			Expenditures
Candidate	Votes	%	±%	Expenditures
Joanne Chianello	10,722	65.20		
Subhir Uppal	2,711	16.48		
Brian Innes	2,652	16.13		
Xavier Commerford	361	2.20		
Total valid votes	16,907			
Total rejected, unmarked and declined votes				
Turnout		48.68		
Eligible voters	34,729			
Note: Candidate campaign colours are based on the prominent colour used in campaign items (signs, literature, etc.) and are used as a visual differentiation between candidates.

==== River Ward ====
Incumbent city councillor Riley Brockington was re-elected in 2022 with 73.08% of the vote. He was re-elected by acclamation.

Nominated Candidates

- Riley Brockington, incumbent city councillor

2026 Ottawa municipal election: River
Candidate	Popular vote			Expenditures
Candidate	Votes	%	±%	Expenditures
Riley Brockington (X)	Acclaimed			
Total valid votes	12,128	32.03		
Eligible voters	37,861			
Note: Candidate campaign colours are based on the prominent colour used in campaign items (signs, literature, etc.) and are used as a visual differentiation between candidates.

==== Capital Ward ====
Incumbent city councillor Shawn Menard was re-elected in 2022 with 78.81% of the vote. He sought re-election.

Nominated Candidates

- Farah Gulzar
- Shawn Menard, incumbent city councillor
- Jaac Doduck, Public Affairs and Policy Management student at Carleton University

2026 Ottawa municipal election: Capital
Candidate	Popular vote			Expenditures
Candidate	Votes	%	±%	Expenditures
Shawn Menard (X)	12,146	87.73		
Farah Gulzar	953	6.88		
Jaac Doduck	746	5.39		
Total valid votes	14,398			
Total rejected, unmarked and declined votes				
Turnout		44.10		
Eligible voters	32,652			
Note: Candidate campaign colours are based on the prominent colour used in campaign items (signs, literature, etc.) and are used as a visual differentiation between candidates.

==== Alta Vista Ward ====
Incumbent city councillor Marty Carr was elected in 2022 with 47.12% of the vote. She was re-elected.

Nominated candidates

- Tressy El-Hawi
- Marty Carr, incumbent city councillor
- Derek McSweeney
- Muhyadin Omar Barkhat, Delivery Driver at Canada Post
- Elsa Niyongabo, Communications Advisor and Press Secretary to Secretary of State (Children and Youth) Anna Gainey

2026 Ottawa municipal election: Alta Vista
Candidate	Popular vote			Expenditures
Candidate	Votes	%	±%	Expenditures
Marty Carr (X)	8,256	66.62		
Derek McSweeney	1,867	15.06		
Elsa Niyongabo	1,193	9.63		
Tressy El-Hawi	802	6.47		
Muhyadin Omar Barkhat	275	2.22		
Total valid votes	12,699			
Total rejected, unmarked and declined votes				
Turnout		36.25		
Eligible voters	35,029			
Note: Candidate campaign colours are based on the prominent colour used in campaign items (signs, literature, etc.) and are used as a visual differentiation between candidates.

==== Orléans South-Navan Ward ====
Incumbent city councillor Catherine Kitts was re-elected in 2022 with 76.47 % of the vote. She was re-elected.

Nominated Candidates

- Jason Wing, owner of La Ha Tacos
- Catherine Kitts, incumbent city councillor

2026 Ottawa municipal election: Orléans South-Navan
Candidate	Popular vote			Expenditures
Candidate	Votes	%	±%	Expenditures
Catherine Kitts (X)	12,074	90.17		
Jason Wing	1,317	9.83		
Total valid votes	13,590			
Total rejected, unmarked and declined votes				
Turnout		30.84		
Eligible voters	44,073			
Note: Candidate campaign colours are based on the prominent colour used in campaign items (signs, literature, etc.) and are used as a visual differentiation between candidates.

==== Osgoode Ward ====
Incumbent city councillor Isabelle Skalski was elected to this seat in a by-election held on June 16, 2025, with 34.01% of the vote, after her predecessor, George Darouze, resigned after being elected as the MPP for Carleton in the 2025 provincial election. She was re-elected.

Nominated candidates

- Isabelle Skalski, incumbent city councillor
- Bruce Anthony Faulkner, 2014 and 2018 provincial Libertarian candidate in Ottawa Centre, and 2025 candidate in Carleton, candidate for Kanata South in 2014 and this ward in 2022

2026 Ottawa municipal election: Osgoode
Candidate	Popular vote			Expenditures
Candidate	Votes	%	±%	Expenditures
Isabelle Skalski (X)	7,205	88.35		
Bruce Anthony Faulkner	950	11.65		
Total valid votes	8,343			
Total rejected, unmarked and declined votes				
Turnout		31.26		
Eligible voters	26,688			
Note: Candidate campaign colours are based on the prominent colour used in campaign items (signs, literature, etc.) and are used as a visual differentiation between candidates.

==== Rideau-Jock Ward ====
Incumbent city councillor David Brown was elected in 2022 with 66.64% of the vote. He was re-elected by acclamation.

Nominated Candidates

- David Brown, incumbent councillor

2026 Ottawa municipal election: Rideau-Jock
Candidate	Popular vote			Expenditures
Candidate	Votes	%	±%	Expenditures
David Brown (X)	Acclaimed			
Total valid votes	8,502	31.82		
Eligible voters	26,716			
Note: Candidate campaign colours are based on the prominent colour used in campaign items (signs, literature, etc.) and are used as a visual differentiation between candidates.

==== Riverside South-Findlay Creek Ward ====
Incumbent city councillor Steve Desroches was elected in 2022 with 67.89% of the vote. He was re-elected.

Nominated candidates

- Muyiwa Ojo
- Steve Desroches, incumbent city councillor

2026 Ottawa municipal election: Riverside South-Findlay Creek
Candidate	Popular vote			Expenditures
Candidate	Votes	%	±%	Expenditures
Steve Desroches (X)	7,702	84.98		
Muyiwa Ojo	1,361	15.02		
Total valid votes	9,295			
Total rejected, unmarked and declined votes				
Turnout		29.14		
Eligible voters	31,902			
Note: Candidate campaign colours are based on the prominent colour used in campaign items (signs, literature, etc.) and are used as a visual differentiation between candidates.

==== Kanata South Ward ====
Incumbent city councillor Allan Hubley was re-elected in 2022 with 33.86% of the vote. He was defeated.

Nominated Candidates

- Erin Coffin, senior advisor at Health Canada and President of the Bridlewood Community Association, ran in this ward in 2022
- Allan Hubley, incumbent councillor
- Megan Strazds-Esenbergs, policy analyst for Employment and Social Development Canada
- Sam Bhalesar, Ontario Liberal Party candidate for Ottawa West—Nepean in the 2022 Ontario general election

2026 Ottawa municipal election: Kanata South
Candidate	Popular vote			Expenditures
Candidate	Votes	%	±%	Expenditures
Erin Coffin	7,878	49.69		
Allan Hubley (X)	5,248	33.10		
Sam Bhalesar	1,547	9.76		
Megan Strazds-Esenbergs	1,182	7.46		
Total valid votes	16,001			
Total rejected, unmarked and declined votes				
Turnout		38.83		
Eligible voters	41,205			
Note: Candidate campaign colours are based on the prominent colour used in campaign items (signs, literature, etc.) and are used as a visual differentiation between candidates.

==== Barrhaven East Ward ====
Incumbent city councillor Wilson Lo was elected in 2022 with 36.82% of the vote. He was re-elected

Nominated Candidates

- Wilson Lo, incumbent city councillor
- Zahy Adam, healthcare professional
- Jules Ruhinda, ran in the 2010 election in Knoxdale-Merivale Ward.
- Yoosaf Melparamba, realtor
- Ahmed Alsabaawi

2026 Ottawa municipal election: Barrhaven East
Candidate	Popular vote			Expenditures
Candidate	Votes	%	±%	Expenditures
Wilson Lo (X)	9,987	76.86		
Yoosaf Melparamba	889	6.84		
Ahmed Alsabaawi	868	6.68		
Jules Ruhinda	701	5.40		
Zahy A Adam	548	4.22		
Total valid votes	13,246			
Total rejected, unmarked and declined votes				
Turnout		34.18		
Eligible voters	38,757			
Note: Candidate campaign colours are based on the prominent colour used in campaign items (signs, literature, etc.) and are used as a visual differentiation between candidates.

=== Endorsements ===
Barrhaven West Ward

Candidate	Endorsements
Donna Blackburn	Karen McCrimmon (MPP for Kanata—Carleton)

West Carleton-March Ward

Candidate	Endorsements
Clarke Kelly	David Brown (Current city councillor)
Christine Harrison	Eli El-Chantiry (Former city councillor); Vernon White (Former Chief of the Ottawa Police Service and Former Senator)

Stittsville Ward

Candidate	Endorsements
Chelsea Walton	Glen Gower (Retiring city councillor); Laine Johnson (Current city councillor); Janet Stavinga (Former city councillor and former Goulbourn Township Mayor)
Theresa Qadri	Shad Qadri (Former city councillor and candidate's spouse); Marianne Wilkinson (Former city councillor and former Kanata Mayor)

Knoxdale-Merivale Ward

Candidate	Endorsements
Sean Devine	Chandra Pasma (MPP for Ottawa West—Nepean); Jessica Bradley (Current city councillor); Shawn Menard (Current city councillor)
Anna Ielo-Tal	David Brown (Current city councillor); Tim Tierney (Current city councillor); Jan Harder (Former city councillor); Jacquelin Holzman (Former Mayor of Ottawa); Marjory LeBreton (Former Conservative Senator)

Beacon Hill-Cyrville Ward

Candidate	Endorsements
Tim Tierney	Mona Fortier (MPP for Ottawa—Vanier—Gloucester)

Rideau-Vanier Ward

Candidate	Endorsements
Stéphanie Plante	Mathieu Fleury (Former city councillor); Glen Gower (Retiring city councillor)

Somerset Ward

Candidate	Endorsements
Ariel Troster	Catherine McKenney (MPP for Ottawa Centre)

Kitchissippi Ward

Candidate	Endorsements
Joanne Chianello	Jeff Leiper (Retiring city councillor and current candidate for Mayor); Catherine McKenney (MPP for Ottawa Centre); Yasir Naqvi (MP for Ottawa Centre)
Subhir Uppal	Bob Monette (Former city councillor); Katherine Hobbs (Former city councillor)

Capital Ward

Candidate	Endorsements
Shawn Menard	Catherine McKenney (MPP for Ottawa Centre)

Kanata South Ward

Candidate	Endorsements
Erin Coffin	Marianne Wilkinson (Former city councillor and former Kanata Mayor); Peggy Feltmate (Former city councillor)

== School Board ==
=== Ottawa Catholic School Board ===
==== Zone 1 - Stittsville/Osgoode/Rideau-Jock ====
Incumbent trustee Scott Phelan was elected in 2022 with 44.27% of the vote. He was re-elected by acclamation.

Nominated candidates

- Scott Phelan, incumbent trustee

OCSB Zone 1	Vote	%	±%
Scott Phelan (X)	Acclaimed		

==== Zone 2 - West Carleton-March/Kanata North/Kanata South ====
Incumbent trustee Sandra Moore was re-elected in 2022 with 77.95% of the vote. She was re-elected by acclamation.

Nominated candidates

- Sandra Moore, incumbent trustee

OCSB Zone 2	Vote	%	±%
Sandra Moore (X)	Acclaimed		

==== Zone 3 - Orléans East-Cumberland/Orléans South-Navan ====
Incumbent trustee Brian Coburn was re-elected in 2022 with 59.87% of the vote. He was re-elected by acclamation.

Nominated candidates

- Brian Coburn, incumbent trustee

OCSB Zone 3	Vote	%	±%
Brian Coburn (X)	Acclaimed		

==== Zone 4 - Barrhaven West/Riverside South-Findlay Creek/Barrhaven East ====
Incumbent trustee Spencer Warren was re-elected in 2022 with 48.49% of the vote. He will be seeking re-election.

Nominated candidates

- Spencer Warren, incumbent trustee
- Greg Hopkins, candidate for this zone in the 2022 Ottawa municipal election and Green Party of Canada candidate in Nepean in the 2025 Canadian federal election.

OCSB Zone 4	Vote	%	±%
Spencer Warren (X)	3,364	53.47	
Greg Hopkins	2,927	46.53	

==== Zone 5 - Orléans West-Innes/Beacon-Hill Cyrville ====
Incumbent trustee Joanne MacEwan was re-elected in 2022 with 72.79% of the vote. She was re-elected by acclamation.

Nominated candidates

- Joanne MacEwan, incumbent trustee

OCSB Zone 5	Vote	%	±%
Joanne MacEwan (X)	Acclaimed		

==== Zone 6 - College/Knoxdale-Merivale ====
Incumbent trustee Eugene Milito was elected in 2022 with 35.71% of the vote. He was re-elected.

Nominated candidates

- Glen Armstrong, Former Trustee for this Zone, teacher at Ottawa Christian School, People's Party of Canada candidate for Ottawa West—Nepean in the 2025 Canadian federal election and New Blue Party of Ontario candidate for Ottawa Centre in the 2022 Ontario provincial election
- Peter Chabursky, business development manager
- Eugene Milito, incumbent trustee

OCSB Zone 6	Vote	%	±%
Eugene Milito (X)	2,139	48.87	
Glen Armstrong	1,465	33.47	
Peter Chabursky	773	17.66	

==== Zone 7 - Bay/Kitchissippi ====
Incumbent trustee Jeremy Wittet was re-elected in 2022 with 68.12% of the vote. He will be seeking re-election.

Nominated candidates

- Jeremy Wittett, incumbent trustee
- Joshua Sargusingh, mechanical engineer

OCSB Zone 7	Vote	%	±%
Jeremy Wittett (X)	1,602	73.96	
Joshua Sargusingh	564	26.04	

==== Zone 8 - Gloucester-Southgate/Alta Vista ====
Incumbent trustee Mark D. Mullan was re-elected in 2022 with 67.52% of the vote. He was re-elected by acclamation.

Nominated candidates

- Mark D. Mullan, incumbent trustee

OCSB Zone 8	Vote	%	±%
Mark D. Mullan (X)	Acclaimed		

==== Zone 9 - River/Capital ====
Incumbent trustee Luka Luketic-Buyers was appointed to the seat on August 24, 2023, after his predecessor, Shelley Lawrence, died on May 29, 2023. He lost.

Nominated candidates

- Luka Luketic-Buyers, incumbent trustee
- Danny Arrais, previous candidate in OCSB Zone 7 in 2022

OCSB Zone 9	Vote	%	±%
Danny Arrais	1,236	56.05	
Luka Luketic-Buyers (X)	969	43.95	

==== Zone 10 - Rideau-Vanier/Rideau-Rockcliffe/Somerset ====
Incumbent trustee Cindy Desclouds-Simpson was elected in 2022 to a full term with 59.67% of the vote after being appointed in 2019. She lost in her attempt at re-election.

Nominated candidates

- Cindy Desclouds-Simpson, incumbent trustee
- Cameron Bonesso, ran in this zone in 2022, community advocate and President of consulting firm Constituent Manager Solutions

OCSB Zone 10	Vote	%	±%
Cameron Bonesso	1,155	56.53	
Cindy Desclouds-Simpson (X)	888	43.47	

=== Ottawa-Carleton District School Board ===
==== Zone 1 - West Carleton-March/Stittsville/Rideau-Jock ====
Incumbent trustee Lynn Scott was re-elected in 2022 with 63.03% of the vote. She will not be seeking re-election.

Nominated candidates

- Alykhan Adbulla
- Jon Flemming, Partner and Managing Director at H. Ken Brown Excavating
- John MacRae, Program Officer at Health Canada, Ontario New Democratic Party candidate for Lanark—Frontenac—Kingston in the 2025 Ontario general election
- Imrana Waraich

OCDSB Zone 1	Vote	%	±%
John MacRae	12,544	61.78	
Jon Flemming	4,067	20.03	
Alykhan Adbulla	2,231	10.99	
Imrana Waraich	1,462	7.20	

==== Zone 2 - Kanata North/Kanata South ====
Incumbent trustee Julia Fortey was appointed to the seat on October 30, 2024, after her predecessor, Alysha Aziz, resigned on July 29, 2024. She was elected.

Nominated candidates

- Julia Fortey, incumbent trustee
- Paul Crawford

OCDSB Zone 2	Vote	%	±%
Julia Fortey (X)	11,882	66.08	
Paul Crawford	6,100	33.92	

==== Zone 3 - Barrhaven West/Barrhaven East ====
Incumbent trustee Donna Blackburn was re-elected in 2022 with 45.27% of the vote. She initially sought re-election, but withdrew on July 6 to run for council in Barrhaven West Ward.

Nominated candidates

- Brenda Abramson, retired public servant
- Kenneth (Kangwu) Xi
- Daniel Pershick

OCDSB Zone 3	Vote	%	±%
Brenda Abramson	8,119	43.68	
Kenneth (Kangwu) Xi	6,736	36.24	
Daniel Pershick	3,731	20.07	

==== Zone 4 - Bay/Kitchissippi ====
Incumbent trustee Suzanne Nash was elected in 2022 with 67.12% of the vote. She did not be seek re-election.

Nominated candidates

- Benoit Massé, Director of Corporate Services and Deputy Chief Financial Officer at Canadian Intergovernmental Conference Secretariat (CICS).
- Emily Quaile, lead negotiator for Queers for Palestine, Community Solidarity Ottawa organizer

OCDSB Zone 4	Vote	%	±%
Emily Quaile	16,977	78.07	
Benoit Massé	4,770	21.93	

==== Zone 5 - College/Knoxdale-Merivale ====
Incumbent trustee Amanda Presley was elected in 2022 with 57.20% of the vote. She did not seek re-election.

Nominated candidates

- Suzanne Lyon, communications consultant, retired public servant
- Lara Bremner, Director at Global Affairs Canada
- Natasha Lynn Mott

OCDSB Zone 5	Vote	%	±%
Lara Bremner	7,515	46.77	
Suzanne Lyon	4,546	28.29	
Natasha Lynn Mott	4,006	24.93	

==== Zone 6 - Rideau-Vanier/Rideau-Rockcliffe ====
Incumbent trustee Lyra Evans was re-elected in 2022 with 54.45% of the vote. She will be running for city council in Rideau-Vanier Ward.

Nominated candidates

- Jennifer Moroziuk, ran in this zone in 2022
- Scott Walker
- Chris Durrant
- Dean Rusland

OCDSB Zone 6	Vote	%	±%
Jennifer Moroziuk	4,619	40.15	
Chris Durrant	4,285	37.25	
Scott Walker	2,018	17.54	
Dean Rusland	582	5.06	

==== Zone 7 - Osgoode/Riverside South-Findlay Creek ====
Incumbent trustee Jennifer Jennekens was re-elected in 2022 with 68.81% of the vote. She was re-elected.

Nominated candidates

- Jennifer Jennekens, incumbent trustee
- Sasha Clayton

OCDSB Zone 7	Vote	%	±%
Jennifer Jennekens (X)	6,371	60.77	
Sasha Clayton	4,112	39.23	

==== Zone 8 - Orléans East-Cumberland/Orléans South-Navan ====
Incumbent trustee Donna Dickson was elected in 2022 with 55.75% of the vote. She ran for city council in Gloucester-Southgate Ward.

Nominated candidates

- Rick Bédard, realtor
- Anthony Wong

OCDSB Zone 8	Vote	%	±%
Rick Bédard	8,984	62.82	
Anthony Wong	5,318	37.18	

==== Zone 9 - Capital/Alta-Vista ====
Incumbent trustee Nili Kaplan-Myrth resigned on June 4, 2025, no trustee was appointed due the Ministry of Education placing the Ottawa-Carleton District School Board under supervision. This zone has been vacant since.

Nominated candidates

- Scott Dutrisac, Mechanical Engineer
- Hilary Clauson, Senior Policy Analyst at Global Affairs Canada
- Sergio DeFranco

OCDSB Zone 9	Vote	%	±%
Hilary Clauson	10,353	65.17	
Scott Dutrisac	3,938	24.79	
Sergio DeFranco	1,595	10.04	

==== Zone 10 - Somerset ====
Incumbent trustee Justine Bell was re-elected in 2022 with 89.13% of the vote. She resigned on June 30, 2025, no trustee was appointed due the Ministry of Education placing the Ottawa-Carleton District School Board under supervision. This zone has been vacant since.

Nominated candidates

- Shannon Boschy, Chartered Investment Manager and Certified Financial Planner, ran in Zone 6 in 2022, Ontario Party candidate for Ottawa Centre in the 2025 Ontario general election, current president of the Ottawa Centre Conservative Party of Canada riding association
- Keelin Pringnitz, PhD, Sr. Business Analyst in the federal public service, former part-time professor at the University of Ottawa, researcher on inclusion, and municipal and not-for-profit consultant.
- Diana Mills

OCDSB Zone 10	Vote	%	±%
Keelin Pringnitz	4,744	47.35	
Diana Mills	3,561	35.55	
Shannon Boschy	1,713	17.10	

==== Zone 11 - River/Gloucester-Southgate ====
Incumbent trustee Matthew Lee was elected in 2022 with 31.99% of the vote. He did not seek re-election.

Nominated candidates

- Brendan Ray, Education Manager
- Jason Glover
- Alan Riddell, partner at Soloway Wright LLP, specializing in employment and labour law

OCDSB Zone 11	Vote	%	±%
Alan Riddell	7,032	49.72	
Jason Glover	4,776	33.77	
Brendan Ray	2,336	16.52	

==== Zone 12 - Orléans West-Innes/Beacon-Hill Cyrville ====
Incumbent trustee Cathryne Milburn was elected in 2022 with 45.04% of the vote. She ran for city council in Beacon Hill-Cyrville Ward.

Nominated candidates

- Rick Whitley, Vice President of Operations at Brofort Inc.
- Cathy Varrette, special education advocate.

OCDSB Zone 12	Vote	%	±%
Cathy Varrette	8,778	69.98	
Rick Whitley	3,766	30.02	

=== Conseil des écoles catholiques du Centre-Est ===
Extended content

The Conseil des écoles catholiques du Centre-Est (CECCE)'s boundaries for Zones 1, 2, and 3 are outside of Ottawa, and are thus not included on this list.

==== Zone 4 ====
Incumbent trustee Jolène Savoie-Day was re-elected by acclamation in 2022. She was re-elected.

Nominated candidates

- Jolène Savoie-Day, incumbent trustee
- Laurentine Mouchingam Mefire Nguwuo' Petuenju', Deputy Director at the Department of National Defence

Nominated candidates

CECCE Zone 4	Vote	%	±%
Jolène Savoie-Day (X)	2,353	77.25	
Laurentine Mouchingam Mefire Nguwuo' Petuenju'	693	22.75	

==== Zone 5 ====
Incumbent trustee Olivier Tremblay-Venneri was appointed to the seat on June 17, 2025, after his predecessor, Claude Lalonde, resigned earlier. He did announce he would be seeking re-election, but withdrew on July 31.

Nominated candidates

- Joy Nehme, Dentist
- André Djomamessi, Program Advisor at Employment and Social Development Canada

CECCE Zone 5	Vote	%	±%
Joy Nehme	1,498	56.08	
André Djomamessi	1,173	43.92	

==== Zone 6 ====
Incumbent trustee Denis Forget was elected in 2022 with 82.30% of the vote. He will not be seeking re-election.

Nominated candidates

- David Elisma
- Michel Charron
- Jaycob Jacques
- Samtou Tchamdja

CECCE Zone 6	Vote	%	±%
Michel Charron	1,463	63.75	
Jaycob Jacques	379	16.51	
David Elisma	258	11.24	
Samtou Tchamdja	195	8.50	

==== Zone 7 ====
Incumbent trustee Robert Rainboth was elected by acclamation in 2022. He was re-elected.

Nominated candidates

- Robert Rainboth, incumbent trustee
- Edouard Marava

CECCE Zone 7	Vote	%	±%
Robert Rainboth (X)	1,939	63.16	
Edouard Marava	1,131	36.84	

==== Zone 8 ====
Incumbent trustee Dan Boudria was elected by acclamation in 2022. He was re-elected by acclamation.

Nominated candidates

- Dan Boudria, incumbent trustee

CECCE Zone 8	Vote	%	±%
Dan Boudria (X)	Acclaimed		

==== Zone 9 ====
Incumbent trustee Johanne Lacombe was elected by acclamation in 2022. She was re-elected by acclamation.

Nominated candidates

- Johanne Lacombe, incumbent trustee

CECCE Zone 9	Vote	%	±%
Johanne Lacombe (X)	Acclaimed		

==== Zone 10 ====
Incumbent trustee Monique Briand was re-elected in 2022 with 75.11% of the vote. She will not be seeking re-election.

Nominated candidates

- Valérie Chinan Assoi
- Isabelle Gervais

CECCE Zone 10	Vote	%	±%
Isabelle Gervais	3,071	86.24	
Valérie Chinan Assoi	490	13.76	

==== Zone 11 ====
Incumbent trustee André Thibodeau was elected by acclamation in 2022. He was re-elected by acclamation.

Nominated candidates

- André Thibodeau, incumbent trustee

CECCE Zone 11	Vote	%	±%
André Thibodeau (X)	Acclaimed		

=== Conseil des écoles publiques de l'Est de l'Ontario ===
Extended content

The Conseil des écoles publiques de l'Est de l'Ontario (CEPEO)'s boundaries for Zones 1, 2, 3, 4, and 5 are outside of Ottawa, and are thus not included on this list.

==== Zone 6 ====
Incumbent trustee Marc Roy was re-elected by acclamation in 2022. He was re-elected.

Nominated candidates

- Marc Roy, incumbent trustee
- Michelle Peterson
- Marthe Foka, professor at the University of Quebec in Montreal

CEPEO Zone 6	Vote	%	±%
Marc Roy (X)	826	42.98	
Michelle Peterson	739	38.45	
Marthe Foka	357	18.57	

==== Zone 7 ====
Incumbent trustee Philippe Landry was elected in 2022 with 74.94% of the vote. He will not be seeking re-election.

Nominated candidates

- Soukaina Boutiyeb, executive director at the Canadian Francophonie Women's Alliance
- Musset Pierre-Jérôme, Human Resources Advisor

CEPEO Zone 7	Vote	%	±%
Musset Pierre-Jérôme	1,841	69.68	
Soukaina Boutiyeb	801	30.32	

==== Zone 8 ====
Incumbent trustee Denis Labrèche was elected in 2022 with 64.72% of the vote. He was re-elected.

Nominated candidates

- Denis Labrèche, incumbent trustee
- Abdelkader Amar Berrahou
- Zenab Mustapha

CEPEO Zone 8	Vote	%	±%
Denis Labrèche (X)	778	67.07	
Zenab Mustapha	234	20.17	
Abdelkader Amar Berrahou	148	12.76	

==== Zone 9 ====
Incumbent trustee Joël Beddows was elected in 2022 with 48.43% of the vote. He was re-elected.

Nominated candidates

- Joël Beddows, incumbent trustee
- Zakaria Iltireh

CEPEO Zone 9	Vote	%	±%
Joël Beddows (X)	1,644	69.87	
Zakaria Iltireh	709	30.13	

==== Zone 10 ====
Incumbent trustee Sonia Boudreault was elected in 2022 with 76.62% of the vote. She did not seek re-election.

Nominated candidates

- Mathieu Fleury, former city councillor for Rideau-Vanier Ward
- Réda Lounis

Withdrawn candidates

- Samtou Tchamdja, Principal of Pension Benefits Administration for the CUPE Employee Pension Plan, member of the Social Planning Council of Ontario, withdrew August 20.

CEPEO Zone 10	Vote	%	±%
Mathieu Fleury	2,657	87.60	
Réda Lounis	376	12.40	

==== Zone 11 ====
Incumbent trustee Jacinthe Marcil was re-elected by acclamation in 2022. She was re-elected.

Nominated candidates

- Jacinthe Marcil, incumbent trustee
- Abdelhakim Messaoudi, former CEPEO analyst

CEPEO Zone 11	Vote	%	±%
Jacinthe Marcil (X)	943	68.33	
Abdelhakim Messaoudi	437	31.67	

==== Zone 12 ====
Incumbent trustee Samia Ouled Ali was re-elected by acclamation in 2022. She was re-elected.

Nominated candidates

- Samia Ouled Ali, incumbent trustee
- Nevalette Zayet

CEPEO Zone 12	Vote	%	±%
Samia Ouled Ali (X)	922	62.05	
Nevalette Zayet	564	37.95	

=== Endorsements ===
Extended content

OCDSB Zone 4 - Bay/Kitchissippi

Candidate	Endorsements
Emily Quaile	Catherine McKenney (MPP for Ottawa Centre)

OCDSB Zone 10 - Somerset

Candidate	Endorsements
Keelin Pringnitz	Catherine McKenney (MPP for Ottawa Centre)

== Third-party advertisers ==
Third party advertisers are individuals, corporations, unions, or other organizations that are allowed to advertise, for or against, specific candidates in the election. These organizations have a $25,000 spending limit on advertising.

=== Horizon Ottawa ===
Horizon Ottawa is a progressive community organization that advocates for progressive policies and more progressive elected representatives.

Date registered: August 17, 2026

==== Target Seats ====
In a press release published the day the organization registered as a third party advertiser, the organization announced it is targeting incumbents in specific wards, mainly due to the high proportion of donors connected to the development industry out of each councillor’s donor base. The wards are:

- Beacon Hill-Cyrville Ward: Tim Tierney
- Orléans East-Cumberland Ward: Matthew Luloff
- Kanata South Ward: Allan Hubley

==== Endorsements ====
Horizon Ottawa undertook interviews with candidates and graded them to assess alignment with the organizations policies, with high scoring cadidates put up to the organization's membership voting for approval. An endorsement indicates that the candidate scored 70 or higher and accepted Horizon Ottawa's endorsement.

The following Endorsements are:

- Orléans East-Cumberland Ward: Bob Bell
- Capital Ward: Shawn Menard

==== Recommendations ====
A recommendation indicates either the candidate scored between 50-70 and is the highest-scoring candidate evaluated, or has scored over 70 but has not accepted an endorsement.

The following Recommendations are:

- Mayor: Jeff Leiper
- Orléans West-Innes Ward: Jenna Jessop
- Stittsville Ward: Kevin Hua
- Bay Ward: Theresa Kavanagh
- College Ward: Laine Johnson
- Gloucester-Southgate Ward: Jessica Bradley
- Beacon Hill-Cyrville Ward: Cathryne Milburn
- Rideau-Rockcliffe Ward: Rawlson King
- Somerset Ward: Ariel Troster
- OCDSB:
  - Zone 1 - West Carleton-March/Stittsville/Rideau-Jock: John MacRae
  - Zone 4 - Bay/Kitchissippi: Emily Quaile
  - Zone 5 - College/Knoxdale-Merivale: Natasha Lynn Mott
  - Zone 6 - Rideau-Vanier/Rideau-Rockcliffe: Chris Durrant
  - Zone 9 - Capital/Alta Vista: Hilary Clauson
  - Zone 10 - Somerset: Keelin Pringnitz
  - Zone 12 - Orléans West-Innes/Beacon-Hill Cyrville: Cathy Varrette
