= Marlborough Township =

Marlborough Township may refer to:

- Marlborough Township, Ontario (Canada)
- Marlborough Township, Pennsylvania (United States)
