= Stittsville Ward =

Stittsville
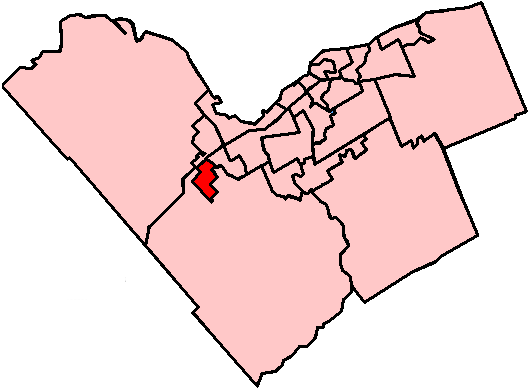
- Location within Ottawa
- Coordinates: 45°16′N 75°55′W
- Country: Canada
- Province: Ontario
- City: Ottawa

Government
  - Councillor: Chelsea Walton

Area
  - Total: 16.3 km^{2} (6.3 sq mi)

Population (2016)Canada 2016 Census
  - Total: 30,510
  - Density: 1,870/km^{2} (4,850/sq mi)

Languages (2016)
  - English: 80.2%
  - French: 8.7%
  - Mandarin: 1.0%
- Avg. income: $53,111

Stittsville (Ward 6) is a city ward in Ottawa, Ontario, Canada, represented on Ottawa City Council. It consists of the community of Stittsville in suburban Ottawa. Prior to the 2006 election, the Ward was known as Goulbourn Ward which consisted of the former Goulbourn Township (including Stittsville and Richmond). The ward was altered in 2006, by losing all of the rural parts of Goulbourn (including urban Richmond) and gaining a tiny bit of the former city of Kanata around the Canadian Tire Centre. The ward was created when Goulbourn was amalgamated into Ottawa in 2000. It was known as Stittsville-Kanata West Ward until 2010.

In 2014, the ward expanded to gain the newly built Blackstone subdivision from Rideau-Goulbourn Ward. Following the 2020 Ottawa Ward boundary review, the ward will gain new territory on its northern and southern edges to accommodate proposed housing developments.

== City councillors ==
From 1994 to 2001, the area was part of Western Townships Ward (Ward 5) on regional council. The "Ward 6" moniker was given to Cumberland-Osgoode Ward.

1. Janet Stavinga (2001–2006)
2. Shad Qadri (2006–2018)
3. Glen Gower (2018–2026)
4. Chelsea Walton (2026–present)

== Election results ==
=== 2000 Ottawa municipal election ===
Following amalgamation, Goulbourn Mayor Janet Stavinga defeated regional councillor Betty Hill and Goulbourn's Ward 3 township councillor Steven Lewis.

City council
Candidate	Votes	%
Janet Stavinga	4528	45.01
Betty Hill	3401	33.80
Steven Lewis	2132	21.19

=== 2003 Ottawa municipal election ===
City council
Candidate	Votes	%
Janet Stavinga	5076	64.15
Michal P. O'Rourke	2837	35.85

=== 2006 Ottawa municipal election ===
Incumbent councillor Janet Stavinga decided against running for re-election, in the newly formed ward which lost most of its rural areas. The race to fill the seat is between Gilles R. Chasles and Shad Qadri. Chasles is a Conservative and a businessman, owning Danicks Data Systems. Qadri is also a businessman, operating Showbiz Entertainment and Gifts with his family.

City council
Candidate	Votes	%
Shad Qadri	6287	72.02
Gilles R. Chasles	2442	27.98

=== 2010 Ottawa municipal election ===
City council
Candidate	Votes	%
Shad Qadri	7185	91.46
Richard Eveleigh	671	8.54

=== 2014 Ottawa municipal election ===
City council
Candidate	Vote	%
Shad Qadri	5,182	60.94
David Lee	3,322	39.06

Ottawa mayor (Ward results)
Candidate	Vote	%
Jim Watson	5,745	68.54
Mike Maguire	2,331	27.81
Rebecca Pyrah	74	0.88
Robert White	63	0.75
Anwar Syed	60	0.72
Darren W. Wood	53	0.63
Bernard Couchman	29	0.35
Michael St. Arnaud	27	0.32

=== 2018 Ottawa municipal election ===
Council candidate	Vote	%
Glen Gower	5,877	57.86
Shad Qadri	4,280	42.14

=== 2022 Ottawa municipal election ===
Council candidate	Vote	%
Glen Gower	7,758	58.67
Mathew Duchesne	2,692	20.36
Tanya Hein	1,528	11.56
Kevin Hua	1,244	9.41

=== 2026 Ottawa municipal election ===
2026 Ottawa municipal election: Stittsville
Candidate	Popular vote			Expenditures
Candidate	Votes	%	±%	Expenditures
Chelsea Walton	6,847	43.72		
Theresa Qadri	2,332	14.89		
Kevin Hua	2,153	13.75		
Paul Meek	1,538	9.82		
Sheetal Narwal	1,203	7.68		
Tanya Hein	721	4.60		
Nagmani Sharma	380	2.43		
Marie-Ange Yindaki Ahinful	274	1.75		
Devin Michael Fitzgerald O'Brien	212	1.35		
Total valid votes	15,741			
Total rejected, unmarked and declined votes				
Turnout		39.27		
Eligible voters	40,079			
Note: Candidate campaign colours are based on the prominent colour used in campaign items (signs, literature, etc.) and are used as a visual differentiation between candidates.
