= Henry Burritt =

Canadian politician

Henry Burritt (August 26, 1791 – November 4, 1872) was a farmer and political figure in Upper Canada.

He was born in Augusta Township in 1791, the son of Stephen Burritt. He settled on a farm in Marlborough Township. In 1821, he was appointed justice of the peace in the Johnstown District. He was a member of the local militia, eventually becoming lieutenant-colonel. He was elected to the 13th Parliament of Upper Canada in an 1839 by-election after William Benjamin Wells was expelled from the assembly.

He died at Burritt's Rapids in 1872.
