= Betty Hill (politician) =

Canadian politician (1937–2013)

Margaret Elizabeth Hill (née Dubois; May 12, 1937 – November 4, 2013) was a Canadian pre-amalgamation municipal politician in Ottawa, Ontario. She was the reeve of Richmond, Ontario and following amalgamation in 1974, was mayor of Goulbourn Township, Ontario until 1981. She also sat on the council of the Regional Municipality of Ottawa-Carleton.

In 1994, she was elected to Ottawa-Carleton Regional Council, two years after getting a law degree. She won election by just 75 votes, defeating West Carleton mayor Roland Armitage. She represented Western Townships Ward, which covered Goulbourn, Rideau and West Carleton Townships. She was re-elected by acclamation in 1997.

In 1997, Hill ran for the Progressive Conservative Party of Canada in Nepean—Carleton, but disagreed with party leader Jean Charest over calling Quebec a 'distinct society'. She finished third in the race with 19.0%. A "firebrand conservative", Hill opposed bilingualism in her career, was a fierce francophobe (source: Riley, Susan, 'Tory cheer belies huge electoral challenge, The Ottawa Citizen; Ottawa, Ont. [Ottawa, Ont]. 10 Mar 1997: D.4.), was a tax hawk, supported suburban developments and opposed social projects.

Prior to Ottawa's amalgamation in 2001, Hill ran 2000 municipal elections for the new Goulbourn Ward, but lost to Goulbourn Mayor Janet Stavinga.

Hill died from diabetes complications on November 4, 2013, at the age of 76.
