= Rideau Correctional and Treatment Centre =

Demolished prison in Ontario, Canada

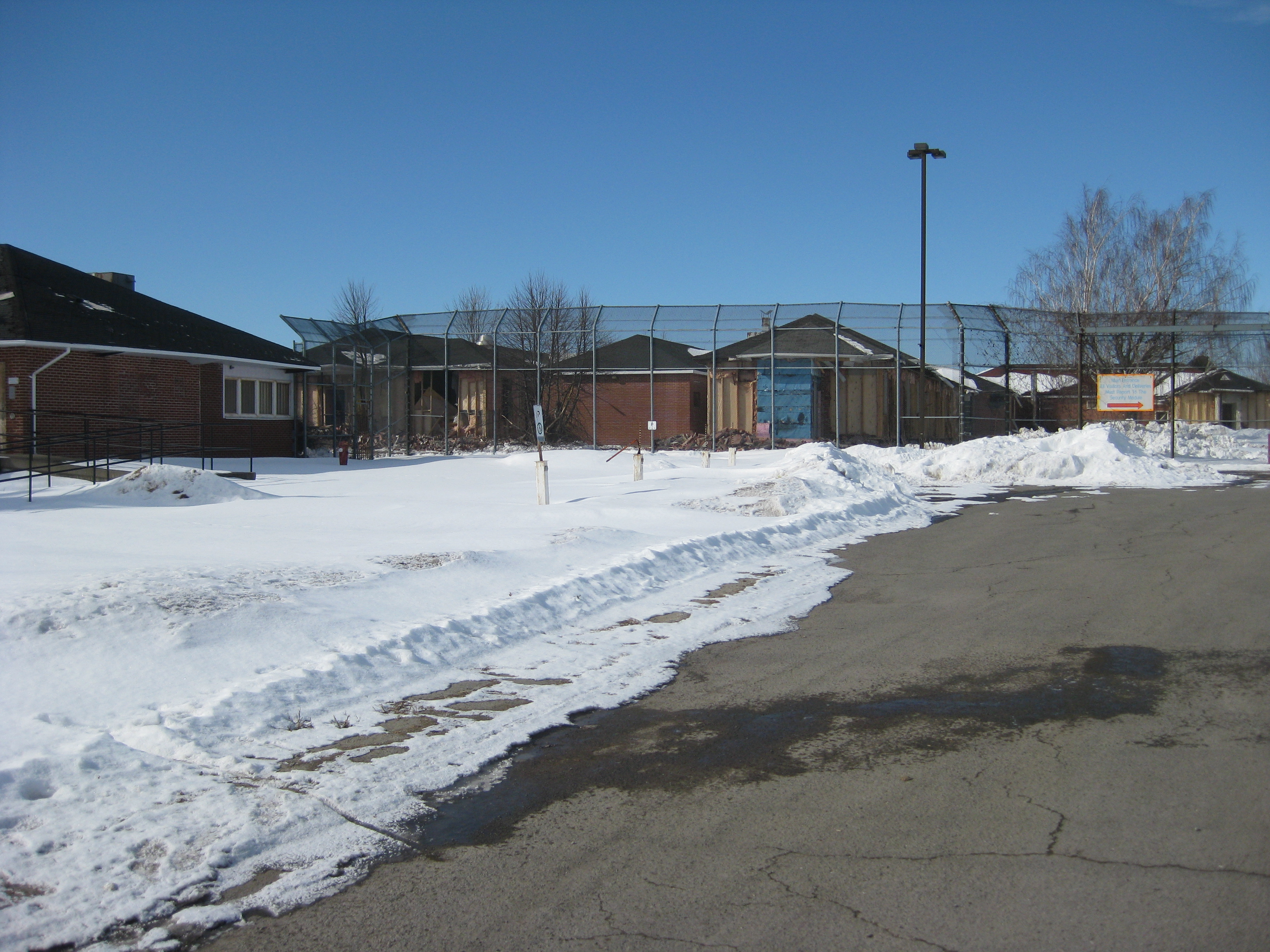
- Interactive map of Rideau Correctional and Treatment Centre
- Location: Burritts Rapids, Ontario, Canada; 44°58′25″N 75°49′23″W
- Status: Closed
- Security class: Minimum
- Opened: 1947
- Closed: January, 2004
- Managed by: Ontario Ministry of Community Safety and Correctional Services

Rideau Correctional Centre was opened in 1947 as a minimum-security facility, with an integrated farm where inmates could learn skills to be plied upon their release. It was decommissioned in 2004, and subsequently demolished in 2013.
