= Stanley Corners, Ontario =

Stanley Corners
- Dispersed rural community
- Stittsville Main Street in Stanley Corners

- Location within Southern Ontario
- Coordinates: 45°14′08″N 75°54′22″W
- Country: Canada
- Province: Ontario
- Township: Goulbourn
- Municipality: Ottawa
- Time zone: UTC-5 (Eastern (EST))
  - Summer (DST): UTC-4 (EDT)
- GNBC Code: FCRXR

Stanley Corners is a dispersed rural community in Goulbourn Township, Ottawa, Ontario, Canada.

== History ==
John Rathwell and his wife Esther settled here in the 1850s, and named the place "Rathwells Corners". John Rathwell was a local schoolteacher, and he and Esther opened a hotel here in the 1850s. Located at a crossroads, the Rathwell's hotel served travellers going to nearby Richmond, and seasonal workers heading to the upper Ottawa Valley where lumber camps were located. The hotel was purchased by Jonathon Stanley, who renamed the settlement "Stanley Corners". It was also nicknamed "Struggle Town" by early Irish settlers. The hotel building was demolished in the 1990s after being declared a roadway hazard.

St. Thomas Anglican Church was built in 1866. It was destroyed by fire in 1964 after being struck by lightning.

In 1872, Goulbourn Township Hall was built at Stanley Corners, and was used as the seat of government for the township. In 1990, the Goulbourn Museum opened in the former Township Hall.

Between 1879 and 1915, a school, saw mill, cement factory, blacksmith, cheese factory, and general store and post office had been established in Stanley Corners.

Goulbourn Township, which included Stanley Corners, was amalgamated into the city of Ottawa in 2001.
