= Marlborough Township, Ontario =

Coordinates: 45°05′N 75°48′W

Marlborough Township is a former incorporated and now geographic township in eastern Ontario, Canada.

Marlborough was located in the southern part of Carleton County. It was bounded to the south by Oxford Township, to the southwest by Montague Township, to the northwest by Goulbourn Township and to the northeast by North Gower Township. The Rideau River runs along the border with Oxford Township.

It was established in 1791. In 1800, it became part of Carleton County and was incorporated as a township in 1850. The first family to settle in this area was that of Stephen Burritt, a United Empire Loyalist, in 1793. The township merged with North Gower Township in 1974 to become Rideau Township. Rideau, in turn, became part of the amalgamated city of Ottawa in 2001.

Marlborough Township took its name from John Churchill, 1st Duke of Marlborough.

According to the Canada 2016 Census, the Township had a population of 2,204. According to the Canada 2021 Census, this had increased to 2,368.

== Reeves ==
- 1850 John Pierce
- 1852 S. Burrett
- 1853 William Mackey
- 1857 William Kidd
- 1861 William Mackey
- 1867 J. Mills
- 1869 William Kidd
- 1871 Hugh Conn
- 1872 James Mills
- 1875 William Hill
- 1878 W.R. Pierce
- 1881 R. Mackey
- 1889 R. Beckett
- 1893 R. Mackey
- 1897 n/a
- 1907 George Bearman
- 1912 W. Ormrod
- 1918 W.H. Pratt
- 1923 A.H. Davidson
- 1933 James S. Meredith
- 1936 Ernest Cole
- 1938 J. Cliff Donnelly

== See also ==
- List of townships in Ontario
