= Stittsville =

- Community
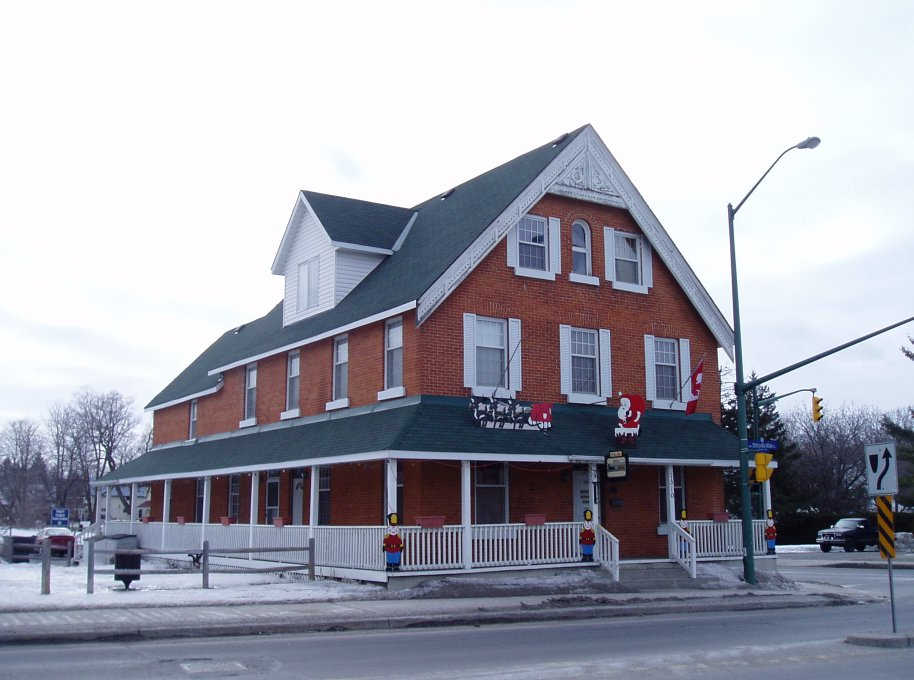

- Location in Ottawa
- Coordinates: 45°16′N 75°55′W
- Country: Canada
- Province: Ontario
- City: Ottawa

Government
  - City Councillor: Glen Gower
  - Member of Parliament: Bruce Fanjoy, Jenna Sudds
  - Member of Provincial Parliament: George Darouze

Area
  - Total: 7.74 km^{2} (2.99 sq mi)

Population (2021 Census)
  - Total: 40,889
- Time zone: UTC−5 (Eastern (EST))
  - Summer (DST): UTC−4 (EDT)
- Postal code FSA: K2S
- Area codes: 613, 343

Stittsville is a suburban community, part of the Canadian capital of Ottawa, Ontario. It is within the former Goulbourn Township. A part of the National Capital Region, Stittsville is immediately to the southwest of Kanata, adjacent to Richmond and about 20 km (12 mi) west of Downtown Ottawa. The urban part of the community corresponds to Stittsville Ward on Ottawa City Council and has been represented by Glen Gower since 2018. As of 2021, Stittsville ward had a population of 40,889.

Three school boards are represented in the area: Ottawa Catholic School Board, Ottawa-Carleton District School Board and Centre-East French Catholic School Board; Sacred Heart Catholic High School, Frederick Banting Secondary Alternate Program and École secondaire catholique Paul-Desmarais are the high schools.

Stittsville is home to multiple municipal services: Ottawa Fire Services' station 81, Ottawa Police Service 211 Huntmar station, the Stittsville branch of the Ottawa Public Library. It also has a branch of ServiceOntario.

Founded in 1854, the original location of the village was centred around Carp Road and Hazeldean Road; this area is now called Old Stittsville. In 1870, the Carleton Country Fire destroyed most of the buildings in the community. Villagers rebuilt around the newly constructed Canadian Pacific Railway. In 1990, the line was decommissioned, and its path is now part of the Trans-Canada Trail, running perpendicular to Stittsville Main Street, along Abbott Street East.

== History ==
=== 1800s ===
Goulbourn Township was founded in 1818 by Irish soldiers in a military settlement program after the War of 1812. The area continued to receive most of its settler population from Ireland. The village of Stittsville was officially founded in 1854 when its first post office was constructed. Jackson Stitt was chosen as its first postmaster, and the village became known as Stittsville.

By 1866, Stittsville was a post village with a population of 100, situated in the township of Goulbourn. The village contained one general store and one common school, with an average attendance of seventeen pupils. The Loyal Orange Lodge, No. 210, met in Orange Hall on the first Thursday of each month. The hall is now home to the Royal Canadian Legion branch in Stittsville. The citizens included John S Argue, general merchant and postmaster. This original location of the village is now known as "Old Stittsville" and was centred around current Carp Road and Neil Avenue.

The Carleton County Fire of 1870 destroyed almost all of Stittsville. It is believed the fire was started by brush burning for the construction of the Central Canadian Railway through the area. By this time, the village had 100 citizens. It had grown its community to include churches, a fairground, and multiple specialty tradespeople. Kemp's Tavern on Hazeldean road, built in 1868, which now houses "Cabotto's Restaurant" and a handful of other buildings were all that was left standing. This was an extremely large fire, encompassing over 250,000 acres (1,000 km^{2}) from Ottawa to Smiths Falls to Carleton Place.

On September 16, 1870, the first train passed through Stittsville as it was being rebuilt around the line. Most notably, the line would eventually serve as part of the Canadian Pacific Railway.

=== 1900s ===
The last train to come through the town was a VIA rail passenger train headed for Western Canada on January 14, 1990. After the rail line was deconstructed, the path was turned into a section of the Trans-Canada Trail.

In 1898, a campground for the Holiness Movement was created in Stittsville. The local leader at the time was Bishop Ralph Horner. The campground was used by movement members every summer until 1974, when it closed permanently.

=== 2000s ===
In 2001, the Regional Municipality of Ottawa–Carleton amalgamation took place. Goulbourn Township was included in the amalgamation, becoming a part of the City of Ottawa. Goulbourn Township included the town of Stittsville, making Stittsville a community within the new City of Ottawa.

On September 9, 2013, one of Stittsville's historic buildings was destroyed in a fire. Located at 1518 Stittsville Main Street, it was under renovation at the time of the fire.

=== Historic buildings ===
The Bradley/Craig barn and farmhouse are still in their original location. Historically designated Concession XI, Lot 29, they are currently located at 590 Hazeldean Road in Stittsville. The land was claimed in 1821 by Joshua Bradley, for which he received a Crown land grant in 1824. The barn was built in 1873 by John Cummings, a craftsman who worked in Goulbourn Township. The barn was built to house the family's dairy herd. Throughout the 1870s, the farmhouse was constructed by the Bradley family. Members of the family farmed the land until the 2000s. The Bradley family owned the property until 2007, when it was sold.

The building that was best known as Green's Hotel is located at 1510 Stittsville Main Street, Stittsville, historically designated Lot 23, Concession X. The building is believed to have been built in either 1890 or 1894 by John Cummings. The original owner was S.J. Butler, who named the building the Pacific Hotel as it served visitors coming to Stittsville on the Canadian Pacific Railway. It is believed that Butler sold the hotel after his daughter, Lala Butler, was struck and killed by a train at the crossing in Stittsville. George Green was the subsequent owner, from which the name Green's Hotel began.

Before 2013, the Alexander's Hotel stood beside Green's Hotel at 1518 Stittsville Main Street, Stittsville. It was built for William Alexander in 1870 or 1871 and ran as a hotel until 1919. It was then purchased by the Bradley family (discussed above), becoming Bradley's General Store and serving the community until 1960.

The Stittsville United Church is one of the oldest congregations in Stittsville. In 1824, the first Methodist congregation in the Township of Goulbourn officially began under the leadership of three residents: George Argue, James Wilson and Archibald Magee. The first log chapel of the congregation was built in 1845 on the same land the church continues to stand on. Multiple iterations of the chapel were built over time. Notably, in 1883, a brick chapel was built, which still constitutes part of the current church structures. The other current structures of the church were constructed in 1952, 1963, and 2006.

== Media ==
Stittsville's community newspaper is The Stittsville & Richmond Community Voice distributed every second week by Canada Post. This newspaper was started in August 2019. It was formerly served by the weekly Stittsville News published by Metroland Media; its 2015 circulation was about 13,446. It was closed in January 2019 after being sold to Postmedia.

Stittsville was featured as one of the filming locations for the 1988 CBC TV Movie The Bobby Gimby Story.

The television series Stittsville on Patrol was created by Christopher Redmond and stars "local Twitter hero" Ben Milks (aka bRian5or6). The show premiered in January 2021 to the highest ratings in Bell Fibe TV1 history. The series was renewed for a second season which aired in September 2021.

== Notable residents ==
- Craig Anderson - Professional goalie, Washington Capitals hockey club of the National Hockey League
- Guy Boucher - Hockey coach
- Matt Bradley - Retired professional hockey player, Washington Capitals hockey club. The Arena is named after Bradley
- Dave Cameron - Hockey coach
- Cody Ceci - Professional hockey player, Edmonton Oilers hockey club
- Kathleen Edwards - Juno-winning musician
- Paul MacLean - Hockey coach
- Julie Steggall - Member of 1994 Winter Olympics freestyle ski team
- Erica Wiebe - Olympic Gold Medallist in Women's 75 kg. Freestyle Wrestling at the 2016 Summer Olympics
- TALK (Nicholas Durocher) - Canadian musician, finalist of Canada's Choice, the Canadian national final for the 2027 Eurovision Song Contest

== Neighbourhoods ==
- Amberway
- Amberwood Village
- Bryanston Gate
- Blackstone
- Crossing Bridge
- Deer Run
- Fairwinds
- Forest Creek
- Fringewood
- Granite Ridge
- Jackson Trails
- Old Stittsville
- Poole Creek Village
- Timbermere
- Upcountry
- West Ridge Estates
- Westwind Farms
- Wyldewood
