= Stephen Burritt =

Canadian politician

Stephen M. Burritt (c. 1759 – January 13, 1844) was an early settler in eastern Ontario, Canada.

== Biography ==
Originally from Connecticut, he fought on behalf of the British at the Battle of Bennington. He and his son were captured and imprisoned but were able to escape because the warden of the prison was a fellow mason. After the war, he came to Upper Canada along the Saint Lawrence River. In 1793, he travelled up the Rideau River and settled with his family near the current site of the village of Burritts Rapids.

He became a justice of the peace in the Johnstown District in 1800. In 1808, he was elected to represent Grenville County in the Assembly of Upper Canada.

He died in Marlborough Township in 1844.

His son Henry later also served in the legislative assembly.
