= Carrie T. Burritt =

American writer

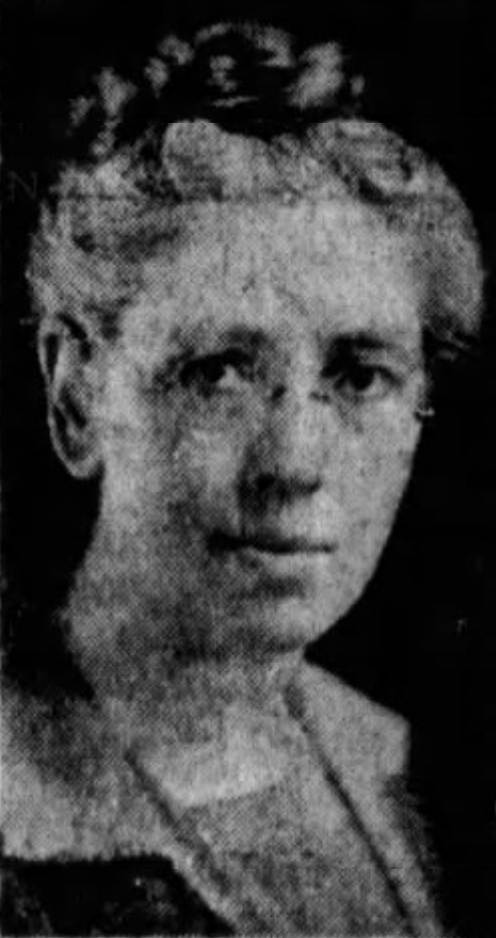
- Burritt, from a 1927 newspaper
- Born: Carrie Amelia Turrell; January 7, 1870; West Webster, New York, U.S.
- Died: June 2, 1955 (aged 85); Woodstock, New York, U.S.
- Occupations: Writer, church worker, educator
- Spouse: Eldon Grant Burritt

Carrie Amelia Turrell Burritt (January 7, 1870 – June 2, 1955) was an American writer, educator, and church worker. She was president of the Woman's Missionary Society of the Free Methodist Church of North America from 1927 to 1939, and wrote a history of the denomination.

== Early life and education ==
Turrell was born in West Webster, New York, the daughter of Orville Anson Turrell and Mary Frances Strong Turrell. Her father died in 1876, when she and her sister were young children. She trained to be a teacher in Rochester, New York, and received an honorary master's degree from Greenville College in 1927.

== Career ==
Turrell was a schoolteacher in Rochester as a young woman. She was active in Free Methodist women's mission work in Illinois by 1906. In 1918, she taught at a national week-long School for Missions conference in Winona Lake, Indiana. She taught at Greenville College while her husband was the president there. She was also active in the temperance movement.

In the 1920s, Burritt was a vice-president of the Council of Women for Home Missions. She was president of the Woman's Missionary Society of the Free Methodist Church of North America from 1927 to 1939.

== Publications ==
- "Hindrances to Missions" (1912)
- "Our Young People: The Watchword of the Hour" (1912)
- "David Livingstone: His Years of Preparation" (1913)
- The Story of Fifty Years (1935)

== Personal life and legacy ==
Turrell married Eldon Grant Burritt in 1893; they had a son, Burton. Her husband, who was president of Greenville College for over twenty years, died in 1927, and her son was a newspaper editor who died in 1945. She died in 1955, at age 85, at a rest home in Woodstock, New York. A chapel at Spring Arbor University and a dormitory at Greenville University were named for her.
