= Shad Qadri =

Canadian politician and businessman (born 1952)

Ottawa City Councillor
- In office December 1, 2006 – December 1, 2018
- Preceded by: Janet Stavinga
- Succeeded by: Glen Gower
- Constituency: Stittsville Ward

Personal details
- Born: September 7, 1952 (age 74) Pakistan
- Party: Independent
- Spouse: Theresa Qadri
- Profession: Politician, businessman

Shad Qadri (born September 7, 1952 in Pakistan) is a politician and businessman in Ottawa, Ontario. He was the councillor for Stittsville (Ward 6) from 2006 until 2018.

== Personal life ==
Born in Pakistan, Qadri came to Ottawa in 1963. Prior to his entry in municipal politics, Qadri was a businessman and was involved in the community. He is involved in several special events that are held in the community including the Villagefest and Parade, the Christmas Parade of Lights, and Winterfest. He is involved in numerous charities and fundraisers. He is a former director and treasurer for the Western Ottawa Community Resource Centre. He is involved in the development of the ward in which several residential developments are underway or are planned including Kanata West, Jackson Trails and West Ridge.

Shad Qadri and his wife Theresa owned the Showbiz Entertainment And Gifts store in Stittsville which is now closed.

== Municipal politics ==
As a councillor candidate he opposed, like his opponent, the expansion project of the Carp Road landfill which was requested by Waste Management. Like several other councillors, he looked for improvements of public transit, better fiscal accountability, increased security measures and the development of the community. He was however against the expansion project of the O-Train north-south light rail line which was cancelled on December 14, 2006.

On October 27, 2014, he was re-elected to a third term, defeating Dave Lee after gaining 60.94% of the vote. Qadri ran for re-election in the 2018 Ottawa municipal election, where he was defeated by Glen Gower, community activist and volunteer.

== Election results ==
=== Ottawa municipal election, 2006 ===
Stittsville-Kanata West Ward (Ward 6)
Candidate	Votes	%
Shad Qadri	6287	72.02%
Gilles R. Chasles	2442	27.98%

=== Ottawa municipal election, 2018 ===
Stittsville-Kanata West Ward (Ward 6)
Candidate	Votes	%
Glen Gower	5877	57.86%
Shad Qadri	4280	42.14%
