= Burritts Rapids Bridge =

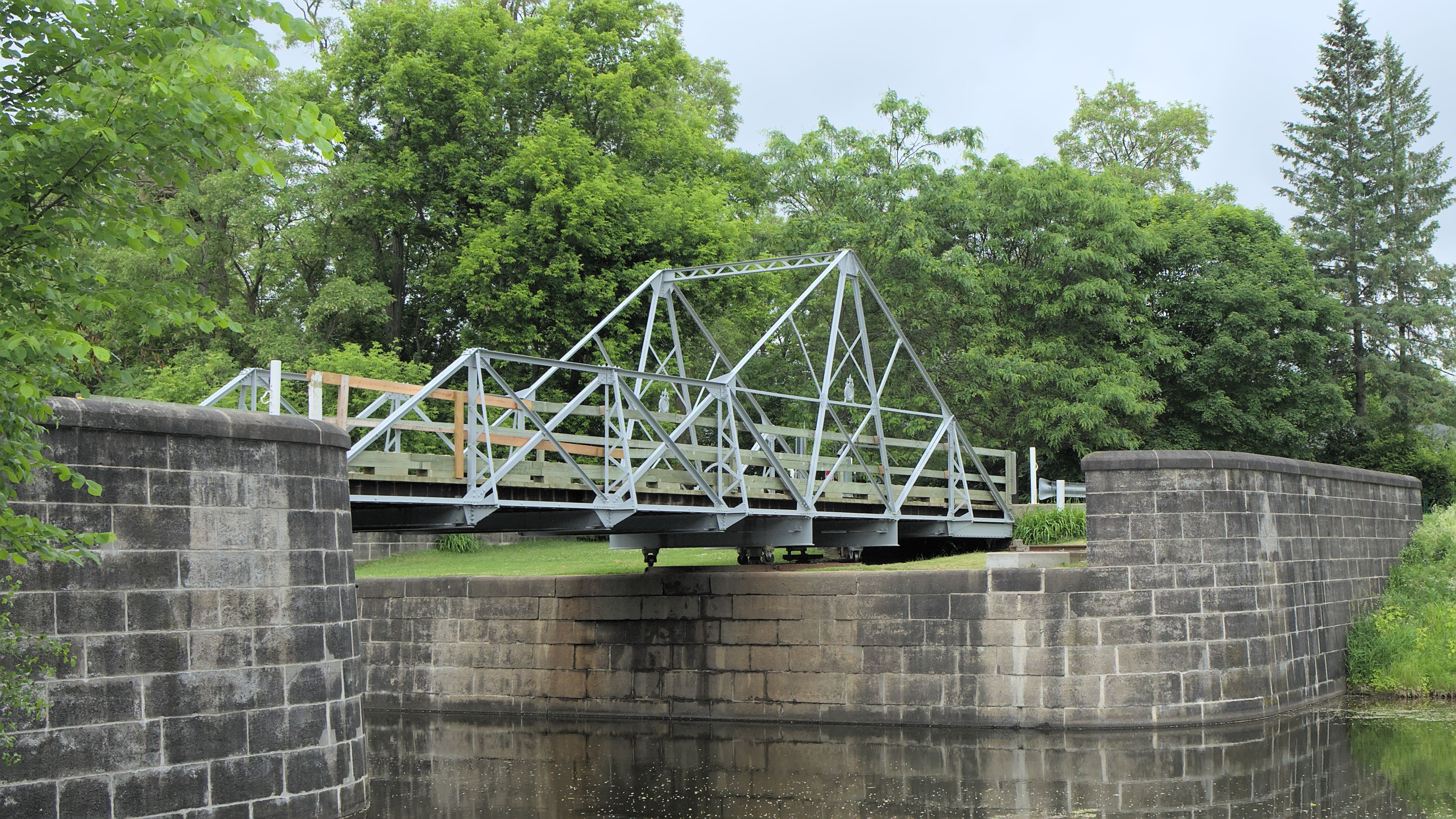
- Coordinates: 44.980046°N 75.796217°W
- Carries: Grenville Street
- Crosses: Rideau Canal
- Locale: Burritts Rapids

Characteristics
- Design: Swing bridge
- Load limit: 5 tons

History
- Opened: 1897

Location
- Interactive map of Burritts Rapids Bridge

The Burritts Rapids Bridge connects Donnelly Drive in Burritts Rapids to County Road 23 in North Grenville Township in Eastern Ontario, Canada. It was built in 1897, and although it has been updated since then, it still has the original design. It is a cottaging site, which is swung by hand by the lockstaff from the nearby Burritts Rapids lock. The white clapboard building next to the bridge is a historical building which now houses the library, though it was originally the bridgemaster's house.

The bridge underwent extensive renovations in 2018. The bridge was closed to vehicle traffic February 5, 2018. The bridge reopened Tuesday, July 24, 2018.
