= Glen Gower =

Canadian politician

Ottawa City Councillor
- In office December 1, 2018 – November 15, 2026
- Succeeded by: Chelsea Walton
- Preceded by: Shad Qadri
- Constituency: Stittsville Ward

Deputy Mayor of Ottawa
- Incumbent
- Assumed office July 1, 2023 Serving with Clarke Kelly, Theresa Kavanagh

Personal details
- Born: April 20, 1978 (age 48) Ottawa, Ontario, Canada
- Spouse: Jacquie
- Children: 2

Glen Edward Gower (born April 20, 1978) is a Canadian politician. He was elected to Ottawa City Council representing Stittsville Ward in the 2018 Ottawa municipal election.

Gower was born at the Grace Hospital, the son of Alen and Gail Gower (née Cheesman).

Gower grew up in the neighbourhood of Tanglewood in Nepean, Ontario, now part of Ottawa. He attended Merivale High School, where he helped start a school newspaper. He received a bachelor's degree in journalism from Carleton University. While at Carleton, he started a website to track gas prices in Ottawa, which would later be bought out by GasBuddy. Later, he would start the website OttawaStart.com. He moved to Stittsville in 2009. After moving there, he helped create a community association for the neighbourhood. Prior to being elected, he was the director of Marketing and Communications with Iceberg Networks. He has also worked in marketing and communications with the Ottawa 67's and Ottawa Senators hockey teams, where he was also the organist. He served as the director of game presentation for the Senators until 2013.

Ideologically, Gower has been described as a "moderate", and has stated that he has "voted for every political party". He is an admirer of former Prime Minister John Diefenbaker, whom he calls a "social trailblazer". One of his websites he created in his youth was dedicated to Diefenbaker.

Gower won election to city council in 2018, campaigning on "healthier development". He defeated three-term incumbent Shad Qadri with 58% of the vote to Qadri's 42%.

Gower was re-elected in the 2022 Ottawa municipal election. In February 2026 he announced he was not going to run for re-election that year. At the time, he was the chair of the city's transit committee and the vice chair of the planning and housing committee.

== Electoral record ==
Council candidate	Vote	%
Glen Gower	5,877	57.86
Shad Qadri (X)	4,280	42.14

2022 Ottawa municipal election: Stittsville
Candidate	Popular vote			Expenditures
Candidate	Votes	%	±%	Expenditures
Glen Gower (X)	7,758	58.67	+0.81	$18,453.69
Mathew Duchesne	2,692	20.36	—	$9,568.19
Tanya Hein	1,528	11.56	—	$4,904.85
Kevin Hua	1,244	9.41	—	$9,434.91
Total valid votes	13,222	98.99		
Total rejected, unmarked and declined votes	135	1.01		
Turnout	13,357	45.59	-0.78	
Eligible voters	29,298			
Note: Candidate campaign colours are based on the prominent colour used in campaign items (signs, literature, etc.) and are used as a visual differentiation between candidates.
Sources: City of Ottawa
