= Janet Stavinga =

Canadian politician

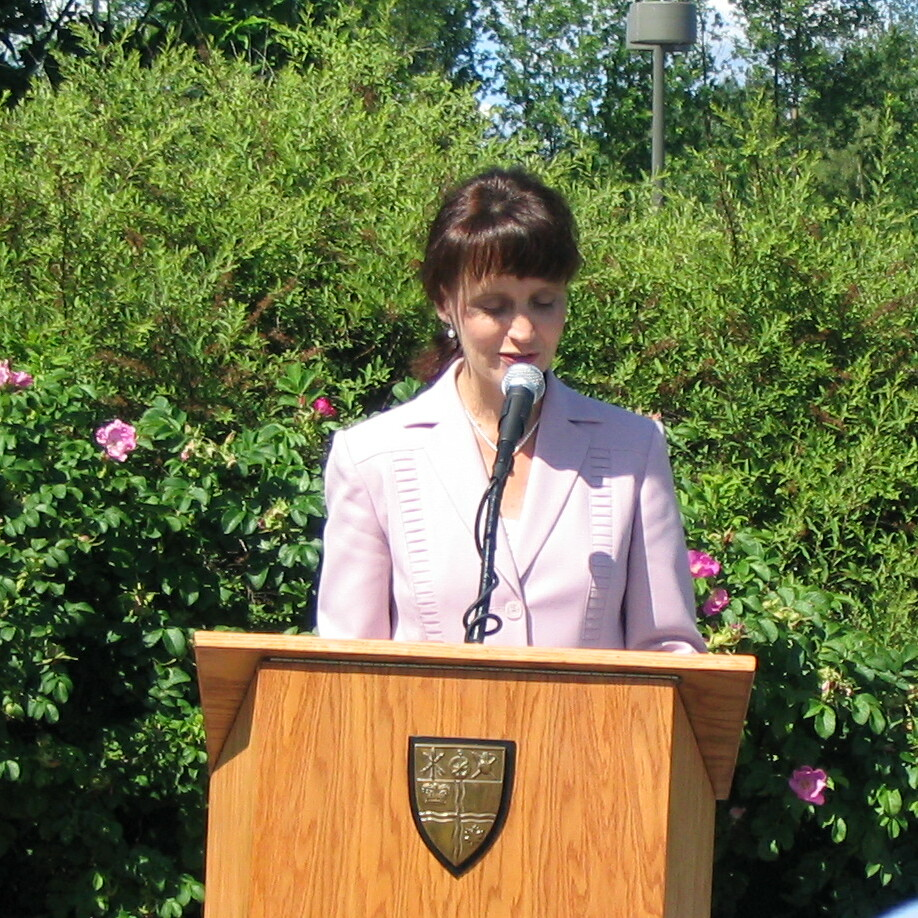
- in 2004

Goulbourn Township Councillor
- In office December 1, 1994 – December 1, 1997
- Preceded by: Mac Drummond
- Succeeded by: Mike Bryan
- Constituency: Ward 1

Mayor of Goulbourn Township
- In office December 1, 1997 – January 1, 2001
- Preceded by: Paul Bradley
- Succeeded by: Position abolished

Ottawa City Councillor
- In office January 1, 2001 – January 1, 2007
- Preceded by: Position created
- Succeeded by: Shad Qadri
- Constituency: Goulbourn Ward

Janet Stavinga is a former Ottawa City Councillor and a former mayor. She represented the Goulbourn ward covering what was once the independent Goulbourn Township, and was mayor of Goulbourn from December 1, 1997, until the township amalgamated with Ottawa on January 1, 2001.

== Career ==
=== Local councillor and mayor ===
She was first a Goulbourn councillor and then was elected its mayor in 1997. She opposed the amalgamation of Goulbourn into the new city of Ottawa. At the time of the anticipated merger, Goulbourn had significant cash reserves from development charges, part of which was for a future sports complex. Controversy arose when she worked to empty those cash reserves by building the sports complex when the merger became inevitable. When Goulbourn was absorbed into Ottawa in 2000 she ran for Ottawa City Council against regional representative Betty Hill and councillor Steven Lewis.

=== Ottawa City Council ===
On city council the most important issue that faced Stavinga was what to do with Munster's sewage. Munster has sewage lagoons and spray field treatment that arguably fails to meet provincial standards. Stavinga supported building an expensive pipeline to Ottawa's central treatment plant. Others felt it would be better to build a small local facility. The residents of Richmond in her ward, strongly opposed the pipeline, which would run under their area. A major concern of Richmond residents was a perceived danger to their water supply, as most of Richmond uses well water. The pipeline debate was a central issue in the Goulbourn ward in the 2003 Ottawa election with Michael O'Rourke opposing the pipeline. Despite the strong opposition from a part of the ward Stavinga was elected with a strong majority.

Stavinga did not run for re-election in the 2006 Ottawa municipal election. She endorsed Alex Munter for mayor.
