= Goulbourn Township, Ontario =

Former township in Ontario, Canada

Coordinates: 45°11′N 75°55′W

Goulbourn Township, Ontario, was formed in 1818, roughly 20 km southwest of downtown Ottawa, with the first major settlement occurring in Richmond. Other communities in the township include Ashton, Munster, Stanley Corners, and Stittsville. Stittsville is the largest community in the township, owing in part to its proximity to Kanata and the Queensway. The township was amalgamated into the current City of Ottawa in 2001.

According to the Canada 2001 Census:

- Population: 23,604 (approx. 39,250 with original boundaries)
- % Change (1996-2001): 22.5
- Dwellings: 7,975
- Area (km².): 271.32
- Density (persons per km^{2}.): 87.0
- At the 2006 census the population of Goulbourn had increased to 28,583.
- At the 2011 census, the population had increased to 36,320.
- At the 2016 census, the population had increased to 40,010.
- At the 2021 census, the population had increased to 51,946.

Three quarters of the population (30,032) live in Stittsville. Richmond has a population of 4,833 (4,055 in the population centre) and the remaining 5,145 live in rural parts of the Township.

Goulbourn took its name from Henry Goulburn, Undersecretary of State for War and the Colonies from 1812 to 1826.

== Reeves ==
- 1850 Thomas Garland
- 1858 J. Sumner
- 1860 T. McCaffrey
- 1861 John Scott
- 1867 C.M. Church
- 1868 Hiram Stykes
- 1869 Robinson Lyon
- 1870 Hiram Sykes
- 1871 Robinson Lyon
- 1873 John Scott
- 1874 Robinson Lyon
- 1875 Neil Stewart
- 1885 John Kemp
- 1887 H.G. Cowan
- 1895 John C. Bradley
- 1897 n/a (1897-1906 County Council was composed of division representatives, not reeves)
- 1907 S.A. Jinkinson
- 1909 George Llewellyn
- 1920 R. Sample
- 1924 T. Alfred Bradley
- 1925 R.N. Sample
- 1932 J.W. Patrick
- 1935 Norman McCaffrey
- 1951 H. Spearman
- 1959 Alan R. Simpson
- 1962 Albert Argue (died in 1964, term completed by Reginald Faulkner)
- 1965 Reginald Faulkner
- 1967 Garnet Bradley
- 1972 Clarence Maheral

== Mayors ==
Goulbourn amalgamated with Stittsville and Richmond on January 1, 1974. In a plebiscite, voters in the amalgamated municipality overwhelmingly selected to retain the name Goulbourn over the other options "Fernbank" and "South Carleton".

- 1974–1981 Betty Hill
- 1982–1991 Anton Wytenburg
- 1992–1996 Paul Bradley
- 1997–2001 Janet Stavinga

== See also ==
- List of townships in Ontario
