= Burritts Rapids =

Village in eastern Ontario, Canada

Coordinates: 44°58′59″N 75°47′55″W

- Rural Community
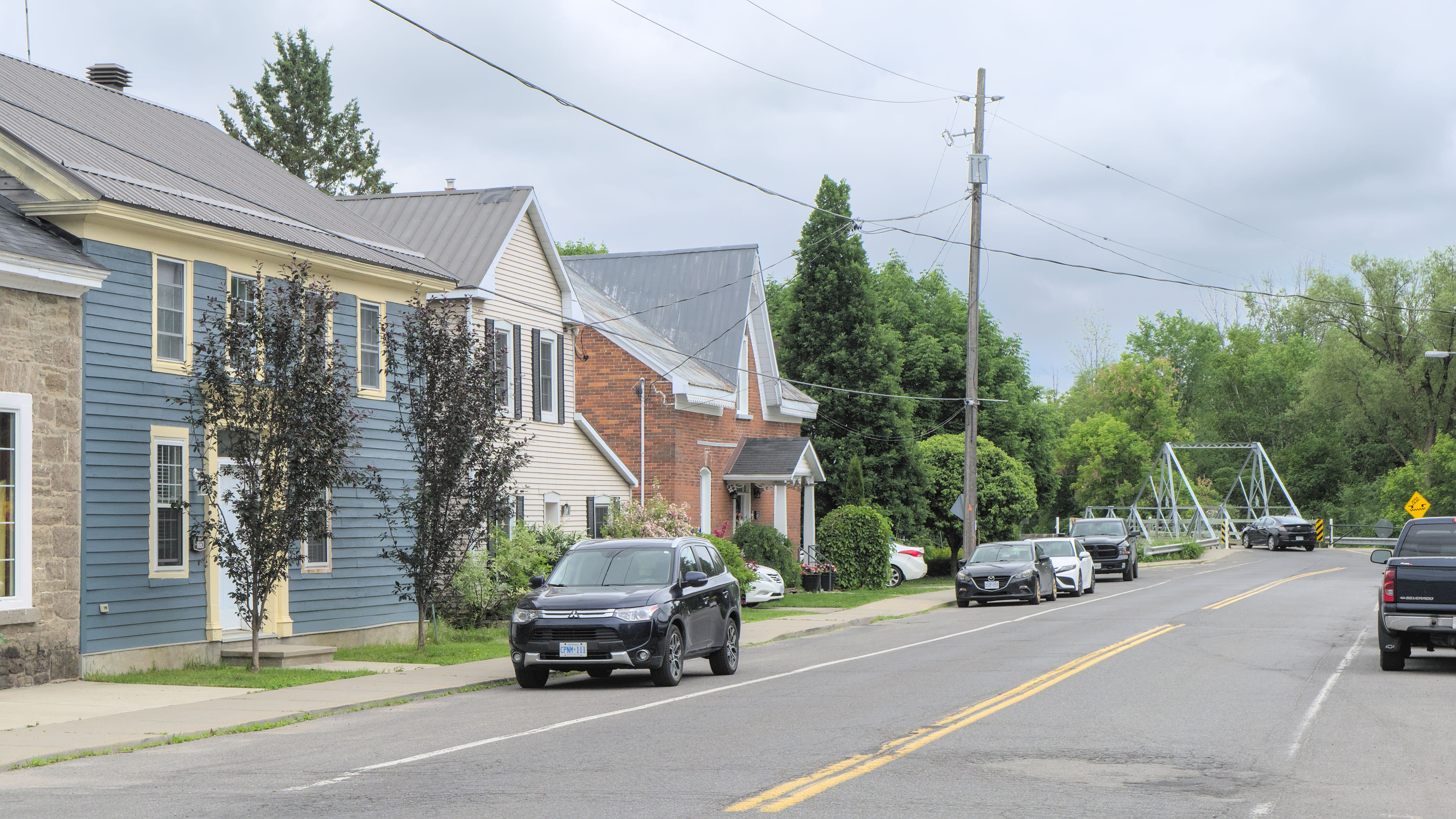
- Looking south along Grenville Street in Burritts Rapids
- Interactive map of Burritts Rapids
- Country: Canada
- Province: Ontario
- Census divisions: Leeds and Grenville, Ottawa
- Municipalities: North Grenville, Ottawa
- Settled: 1793
- Time zone: UTC-5 (Eastern (EST))
- Area codes: 613

Burritts Rapids is a small village located on the Rideau River in eastern Ontario.

The hamlet was named after Stephen Burritt, whose family was the first to settle in this area. At one time, the hamlet prospered due to its location on the Rideau Canal. The community straddles the river, so part is located in the Rideau-Jock Ward of Ottawa, and part in North Grenville Township.

There is a lock on the canal to bypass rapids here, the Burritts Rapids Bridge which crosses the canal and a stationary bridge which crosses the river.

== History ==
In 1793, Stephen and Daniel Burritt, from Arlington, Vermont, settled in the vicinity of the area now known as Burritt's Rapids. A plaque was erected by the Ontario Archaeological and Historic Sites Board commemorating the founding of Burritt's Rapids.

By 1812, Burritts Rapids had become a bustling hamlet. At the peak of its prosperity, it had telegraphic and daily mail, 2 general stores, a bakery, a millinery shop, 2 shoe shops, a tin and stove store, a grist mill, a woolen mill, a tannery, 3 blacksmith shops, 3 wagon shops, a cabinet shop, 2 churches, 2 schools, 2 hotels, a bank and an Orange Lodge.

The hamlet's natural advantages as a transportation centre were enhanced by the opening of the Rideau Canal in 1831. Burritts Rapids was the site of the first bridge across the Rideau River. A post office was opened in 1839.

By 1866, Burritts Rapids was a village with a population of about 400 on the Rideau canal, in the townships of Oxford and Marlborough, and counties of Carleton and Grenville. It had two schools, and citizens were in the lumber business.

Unfortunately, the hamlet was by-passed by the railway, and its importance gradually diminished with the decline of the canal as a means of transportation.

Burritts Rapids was home to the Rideau Correctional and Treatment Centre from 1947 until its closure in 2004. It was subsequently demolished in 2013.

Public high school students in this area go to South Carleton High School in Richmond.

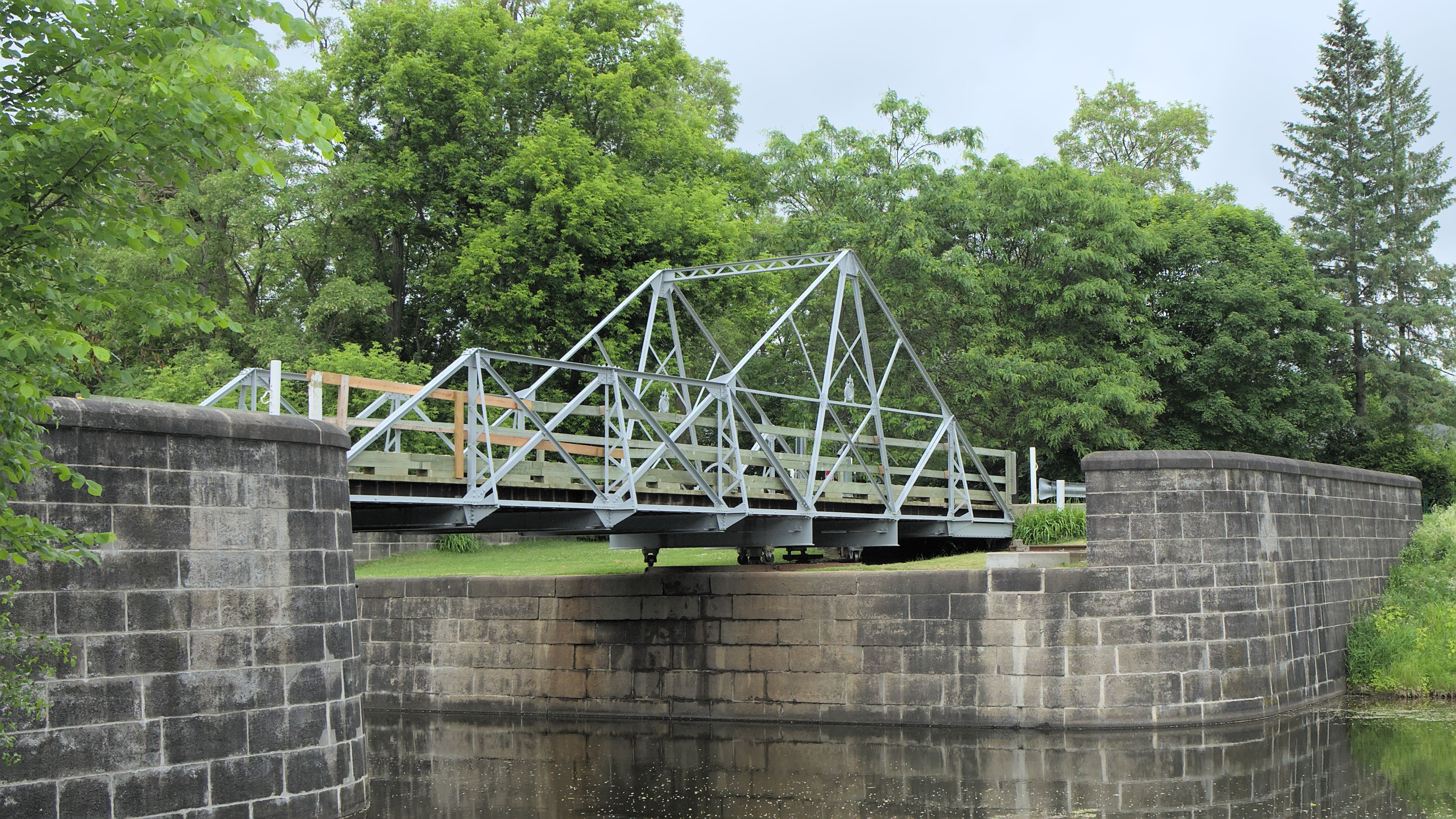
The Burritts Rapids Bridge

== History of Burritts Rapids Community Hall ==
The Hall was built in 1855 by John French and operated as a general store. In 1892, the building was sold and it changed hands several more times during the early 1900s. The facility became known as the "Albert C. White Memorial Hall" in 1927, but in October 1935, Casey Swedlove sold the Hall and its property to the community. At that time, the name was formally changed to The Burritt's Rapids Community Hall, and has been run as a non-profit facility ever since.

In 1984, the Hall was designated under the Ontario Heritage Act as being of architectural and historical value: "… the building is an outstanding example of an early nineteenth century vernacular temple-fronted commercial structure, of the Classical Revival Style. It is clad in narrow feather-edge clapboard and is highlighted by recessed paneled front doors, large commercial style front windows, with paneled surrounds, engage pilasters, with classical entablature, returned eaves and small 12 over 8 upper sashes…"

In 1986, an extension was added to the south side of the building. Funding for the project was donated by several local citizens and businesses, all of which are memorialized on a plaque inside the Hall. Many of the building materials were donated by the production company which filmed "Boy in Blue", in Burritts Rapids in 1984. The roof was installed by a volunteer group who proclaimed themselves to be "The Geriatric Builders".
