= 2009 Progressive Conservative Party of Ontario leadership election =

- June 27, 2009
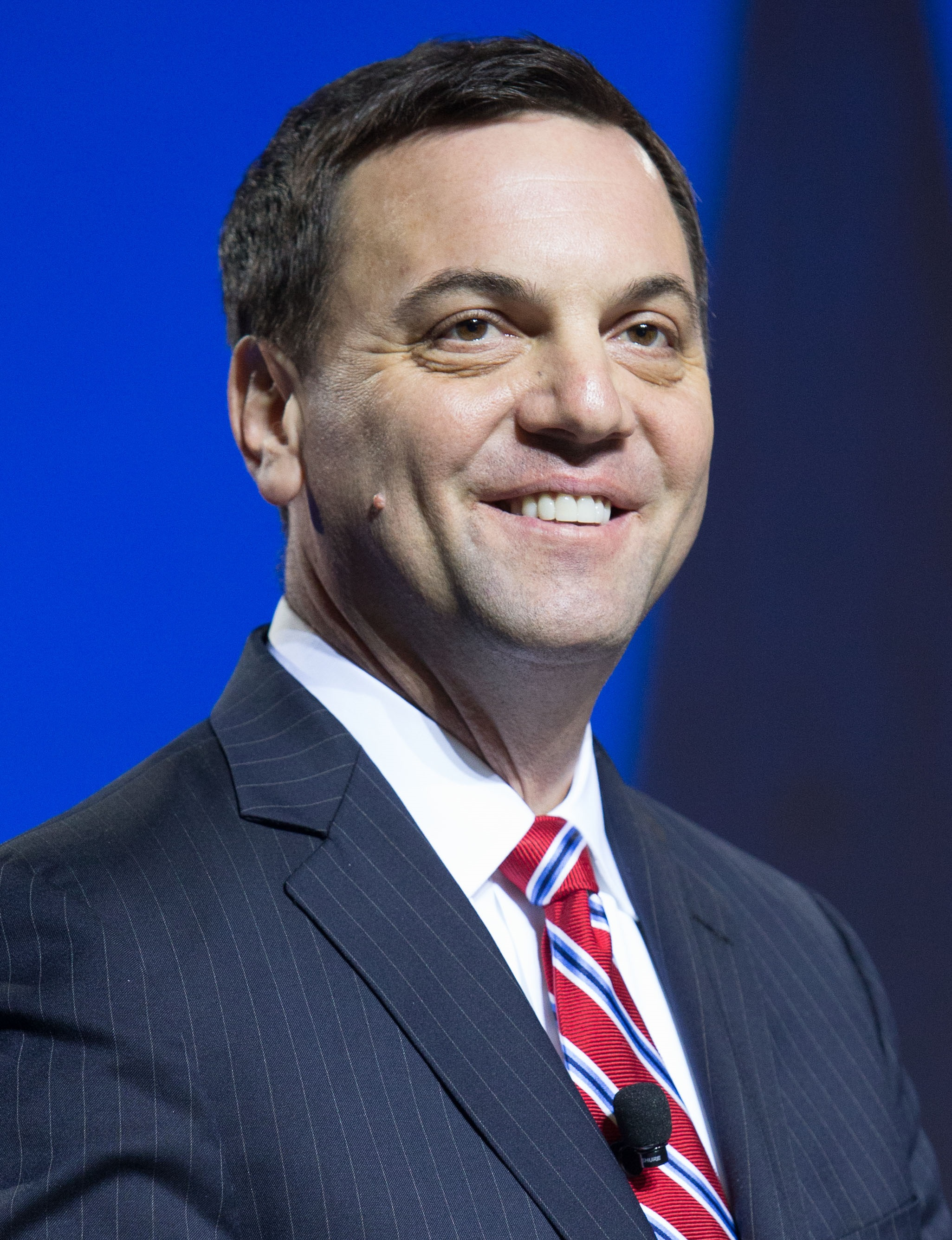

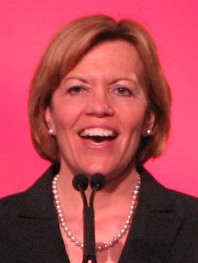

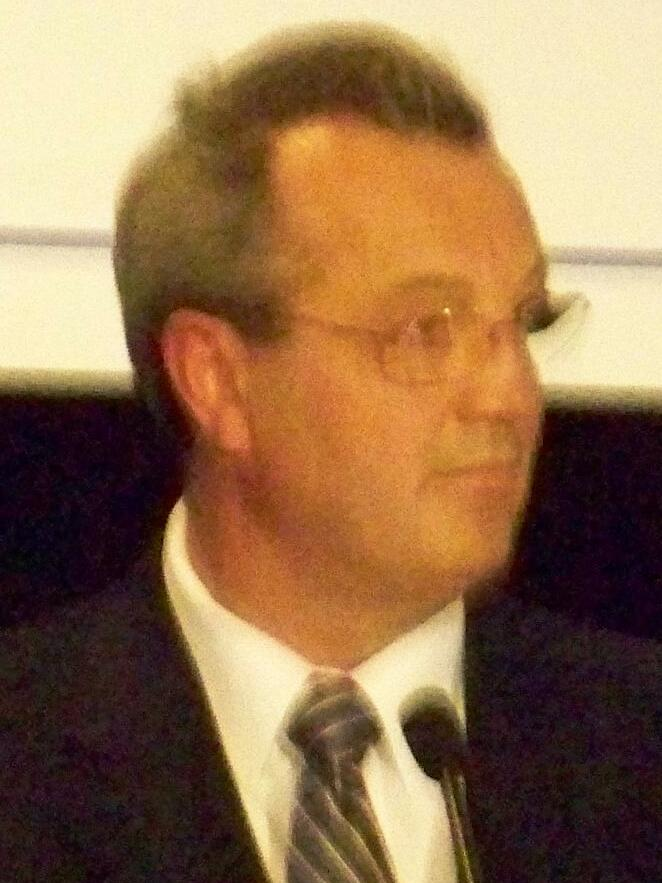
		FK
Candidate	Tim Hudak	Frank Klees
Riding	Niagara West—Glanbrook	Newmarket—Aurora
Final ballot	5,606 (54.69%)	4,644 (45.31%)
First ballot	3,511.87 (33.94%)	3,093.77 (29.90%)
Candidate	Christine Elliott	Randy Hillier
Riding	Whitby—Oshawa	Lanark—Frontenac—Lennox and Addington
Final ballot	Eliminated	Eliminated
First ballot	2,728.66 (26.37%)	1,013.69 (9.80%)
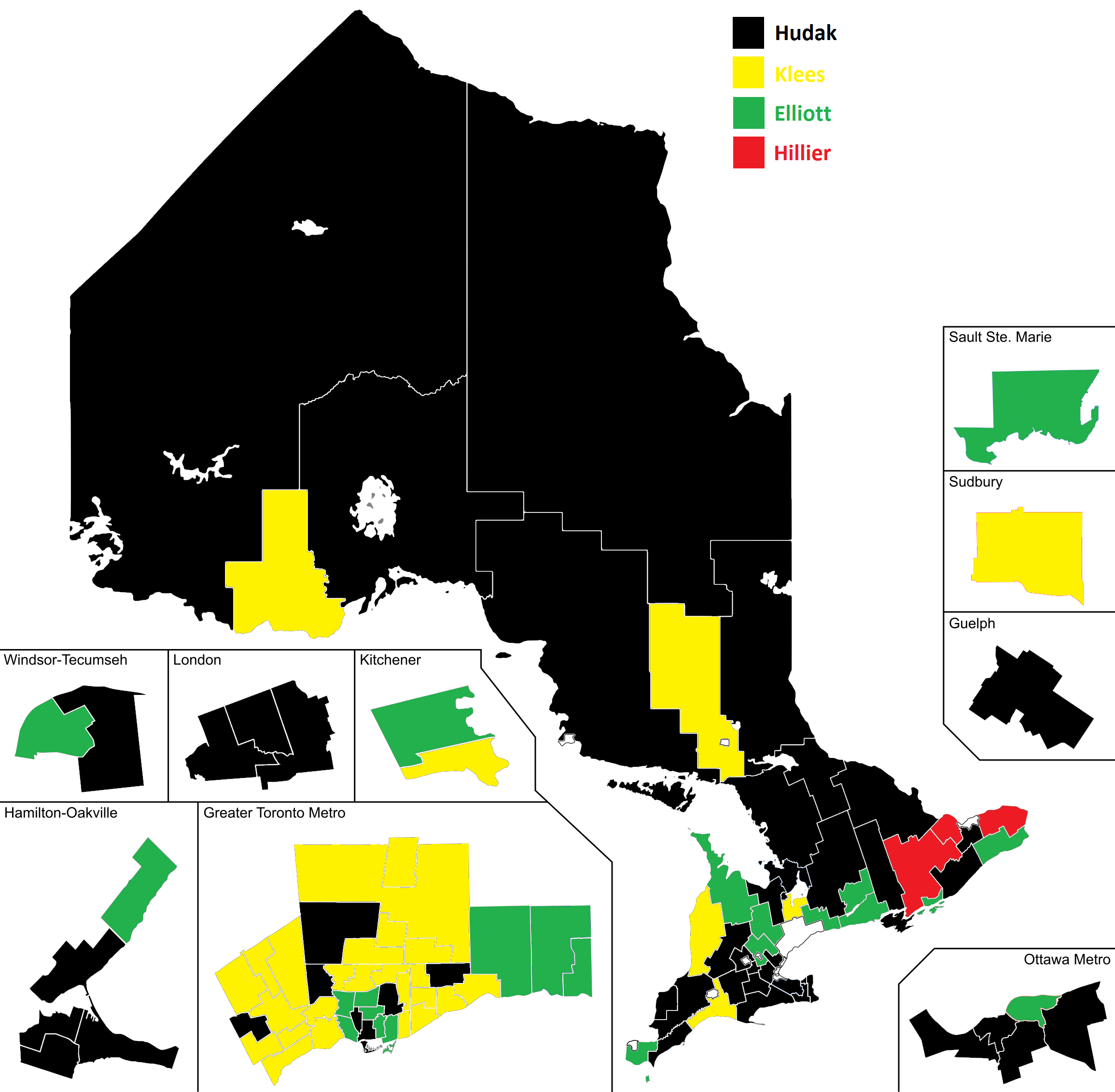
- Results by Ontario electoral district
Leader before election
Bob Runciman (interim)
Elected Leader
Tim Hudak

2009 Progressive Conservative Party of Ontario leadership election
- Date: June 27, 2009
- Convention: Markham Conference Centre, Markham, Ontario
- Resigning leader: John Tory
- Won by: Tim Hudak
- Ballots: 3
- Candidates: 4
- Entrance fee: $50,000
- Spending limit: $750,000

On March 6, 2009, Progressive Conservative Party of Ontario leader John Tory announced his intention to step down as leader following his defeat in a by-election. Tory was elected party leader in the party's 2004 leadership election, and led the party to defeat in the 2007 provincial election in which he failed to win personal election to the Ontario Legislature. He attempted again to enter the legislature in a March 5, 2009 by-election but was defeated by the Liberal candidate.

The party's executive set June 27, 2009 as the date for the new leader to be announced over the objections of several MPPs who called for a September vote. Candidates were required to register as such by April 17; in order to be able to cast a ballot it was necessary for one to have been a member of the party by May 14. Of the 25 members caucus, interim leader Bob Runciman remained neutral in the race and MPP Joyce Savoline did not endorse a candidate.

The party reported that it had over 40,000 members eligible to vote in the leadership contest as of the membership cut-off of May 15, up from 8,500 at the beginning of the leadership race. Of the 43,000 members eligible to vote some 25,429 members cast a ballot.

== Registered candidates ==
=== Tim Hudak ===
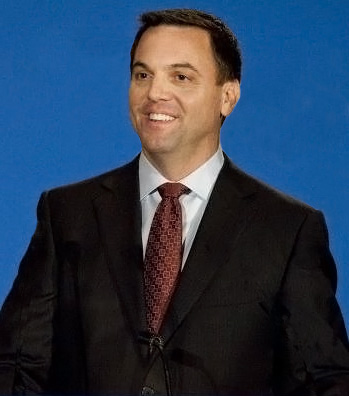
Tim Hudak, MPP for Niagara West—Glanbrook

Tim Hudak, 41, was the MPP for Niagara West—Glanbrook and had sat in the provincial legislature since 1995. He was the party's finance critic and was seen to be on the right of the party. Some consider Hudak to be the "front runner". Including himself, Hudak had the backing of a majority of the 24 member caucus.

- Policies: Abolition of the Ontario Human Rights Commission and replace it with a court-based system based on rules of evidence., Paycheque Protection Law to give workers the option of opting out of funding political campaigns, a secret ballot vote when employees decide to join a union as opposed to card check, introduction of a high school exit exam.
- MPPs who were supporters (12): Bob Bailey; Toby Barrett; Ted Chudleigh; Garfield Dunlop; Lisa MacLeod; Gerry Martiniuk; Norm Miller; Julia Munro; Norm Sterling; Jim Wilson; John Yakabuski; Ernie Hardeman.
- Federal MPs who were supporters (17): Cabinet ministers John Baird, Tony Clement, Jason Kenney, Rob Nicholson, and Peter Van Loan; MPs Dean Allison, Gord Brown, Patrick Brown, Paul Calandra, Barry Devolin, Rick Dykstra, Royal Galipeau, Daryl Kramp, Pierre Poilievre, Joe Preston, Gary Schellenberger, and David Sweet.
- Other high-profile supporters: Mike Harris, former Premier of Ontario, Blair McCreadie, former party President, Tom Long, former party President and strategist, former Cabinet Ministers Brenda Elliott and Dave Johnson, former MPPs Doug Galt, Ron Johnson, Bart Maves, Tim Peterson, and Joe Tascona, as well as 2007 candidates Kevin Ashe, Ron Swain, Pam Hundal, Dan McCreary, Doug Jackson, Antonio Garcia, Bill Fehr, Richard Kniaziew, Bob Senechal, Chris Robertson, Tara Crugnale, Bob Charters, Rob Morley, Penny Lucas, Michael Harris, Monte McNaughton, Rob Alder, Allison Graham, Zoran Churchin, David Brown, Nina Tangri, Bill Vrebosch, Cathy Galt, Phil Bannon, Rick Byers, Richard Raymond, Bruce Poulin, John Rutherford, John Del Grande, Bruce Timms, Lillyann Goldstein, Louis Delongchamp, Scott Hobbs, Doug Shearer, Steve Kidd, Ron Bodner, Lisa Lumley, 2008 federal Conservative candidate Hugh Arrison, John Cruickshank 2nd Vice President, Mark Spiro 4th Vice President, Kate Bartz Southwest Regional Vice President, Tony Quirk South Central Regional Vice President, Eric Merkley President Ontario PC Campus Association, former federal MP and cabinet minister Monte Solberg, former MP Jean Pigott.
- Date campaign announced: April 2, 2009
- Date campaign officially launched: April 2, 2009
- Date officially registered: April 7, 2009
- Result: Winner

=== Christine Elliott ===
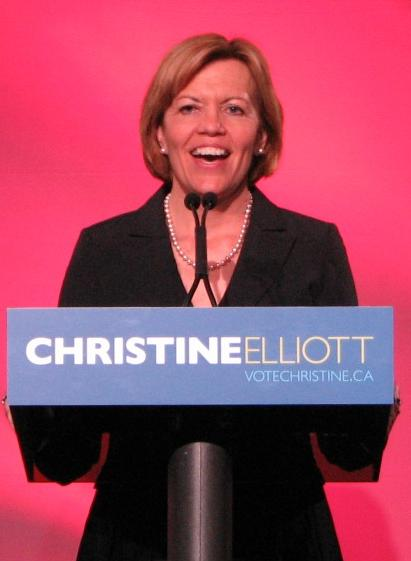
Christine Elliott, MPP for Whitby—Oshawa

Christine Elliott, 53, was MPP for Whitby—Oshawa, first winning the seat in a 2006 by-election, and wife of Jim Flaherty. Elliott filed her nomination papers on March 31 and officially launched her campaign on April 3, 2009.

- Policies: Replace province's progressive income tax with an 8% flat tax along with raising the basic personal amount from $8,881 to approximately $18,000, reform EI and make it more fair to Ontario or build a made-in-Ontario EI solution, crack down on crime - targeting repeat offenders, gang violence, and illegal cigarettes, freeze the minimum wage for 4 years, double tax credit for charitable donations of more than $200, creation of jobs and improve services, access to justice and post-secondary education for Northern Ontario communities.
- MPPs who were supporters (5): Ted Arnott; Sylvia Jones; Bill Murdoch; John O'Toole; and Elizabeth Witmer
- Federal MPs who were supporters (14): Cabinet ministers Helena Guergis, Jim Flaherty, and Bev Oda; MPs Peter Braid, Colin Carrie, Michael Chong, Ed Holder, Dean Del Mastro, Greg Rickford, Bruce Stanton, Dave Van Kesteren, Mike Wallace, Jeff Watson, and Terence Young.
- Senators who were supporters (9): Leader of the Government in the Senate, the Hon. Marjory LeBreton; Consiglio Di Nino; Nicole Eaton; Trevor Eyton; Wilbert Keon; Michael Meighen; Lowell Murray; Nancy Ruth; Hugh Segal.
- Other high-profile supporters: Former MPPs and cabinet ministers Janet Ecker, David Tsubouchi, and Noble Villeneuve; John Weir, Former Principal Secretary to Mike Harris; Judy Bobka, PCPO Secretary; Brayden Akers, President, OPCYA; Richard Ciano, former federal CPC Vice-president; Toronto City Councillors Rob Ford and John Parker; 2006 Toronto-Centre federal Conservative candidate Lewis Reford; 2007 candidates Pamela Taylor, Bruce Fitzpatrick, Gary Crawford, Robert Bisbicis; Former MPP for Etobicoke North John Hastings; former PC party president Kay Wetherall, former Ontario PC cabinet minister and PC Party President Steve Gilchrist, Former Progressive Conservative Minister of Finance and Deputy Premier Bette Stephenson; Former Mississauga MPP and cabinet minister Rob Sampson; former Correctional Services and Government Services Minister John Roxburgh Smith; Denise Cole, former Premier Mike Harris’ Director of Policy.
- Date campaign announced: March 31, 2009
- Date campaign officially launched: April 3, 2009
- Date officially registered: April 1, 2009
- Result: Third

=== Frank Klees ===
Frank Klees, 58, was the Chief Government Whip in the Harris government, and Minister of Tourism and of Transportation in the Eves government. He came in third place in the 2004 leadership election. Klees appeared on Reverend Charles McVety's television program on March 29 and said he would like to run. McVety endorsed Klees during the broadcast. Klees told CTV News that he decided to throw his hat into the ring "after very careful consideration.”

- Policies: Proposed reduction in provincial sales tax to offset application of new Harmonized Sales Tax to items previously exempt from the PST, supports grassroots policy development, improve transportation infrastructure, make university/college/trade school graduates exempt from paying provincial income taxes for the first four years after leaving school.
- MPPs who were supporters (2): Peter Shurman and Jerry Ouellette.
- Federal MPs who were supporters: Lois Brown
- Other high-profile supporters: Rev. Charles McVety; John Capobianco party organizer; Sandra Buckler, Former PMO Communications Director; former MPP Garry Guzzo; John Mykytyshyn, founder of the Conservative Leadership Foundation; the Campaign Life Coalition; former MPP Frank Sheehan.
- Date campaign announced: March 29, 2009
- Date campaign officially launched: April 15, 2009
- Date officially registered: April 15, 2009
- Result: Second

=== Randy Hillier ===
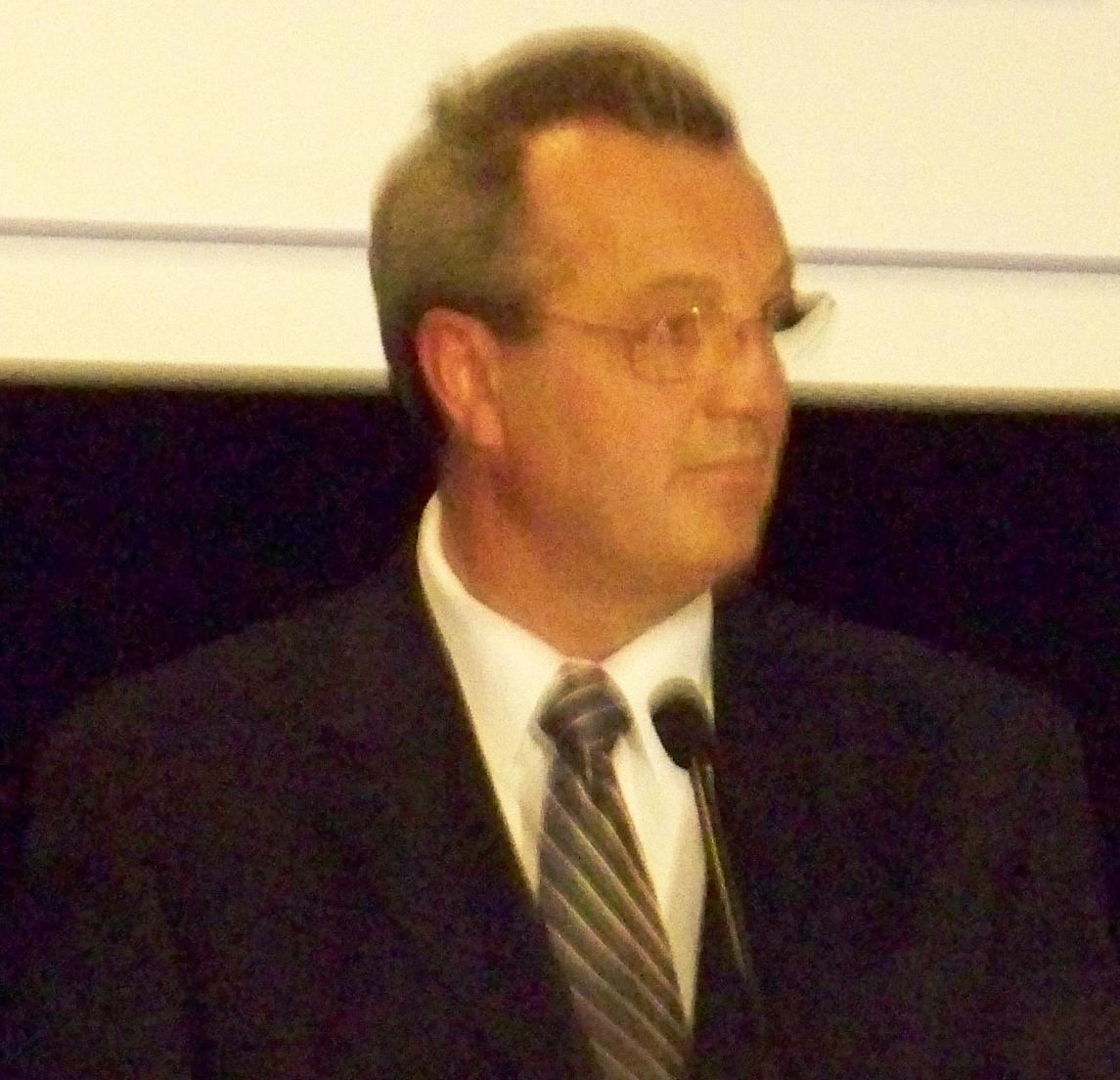
Randy Hillier, MPP for Lanark—Frontenac—Lennox and Addington

Randy Hillier, 50, was a rural activist and founder of the Ontario Landowners Association. He was first elected MPP for Lanark—Frontenac—Lennox and Addington in the 2007 provincial election. Hillier says that as Premier he would abolish the Ontario Human Rights Commission, allow Ontario to elect its federal Senators and introduce a bill making membership in unions and professional associations voluntary.

- Policies: Abolition of the Ontario Human Rights Commission, allow sale of beer and wine in corner stores, election of Ontario Senators, restoration of the spring bear hunt, ending the closed shop in unionized workplaces, reverse the pesticide ban, allowing health care professionals and other gov't paid individuals to refuse to provide services for religious or moral reasons (limiting abortions and same-sex marriages), abolition of the province's property tax assessment agency (MPAC)., increasing the speed limit on Ontario highways, allowing de-amalgamation of municipalities, cracking down on native occupations.
- MPPs who were supporters (0): none
- Federal MPs who were supporters (2): Scott Reid, Cheryl Gallant.
- Other high-profile supporters: Social conservative activist and former Family Coalition Party candidate John Pacheco.
- Date campaign announced: March 30, 2009
- Date campaign officially launched: March 30, 2009
- Date officially registered: April 2, 2009
- Result: Fourth

== Voting results ==
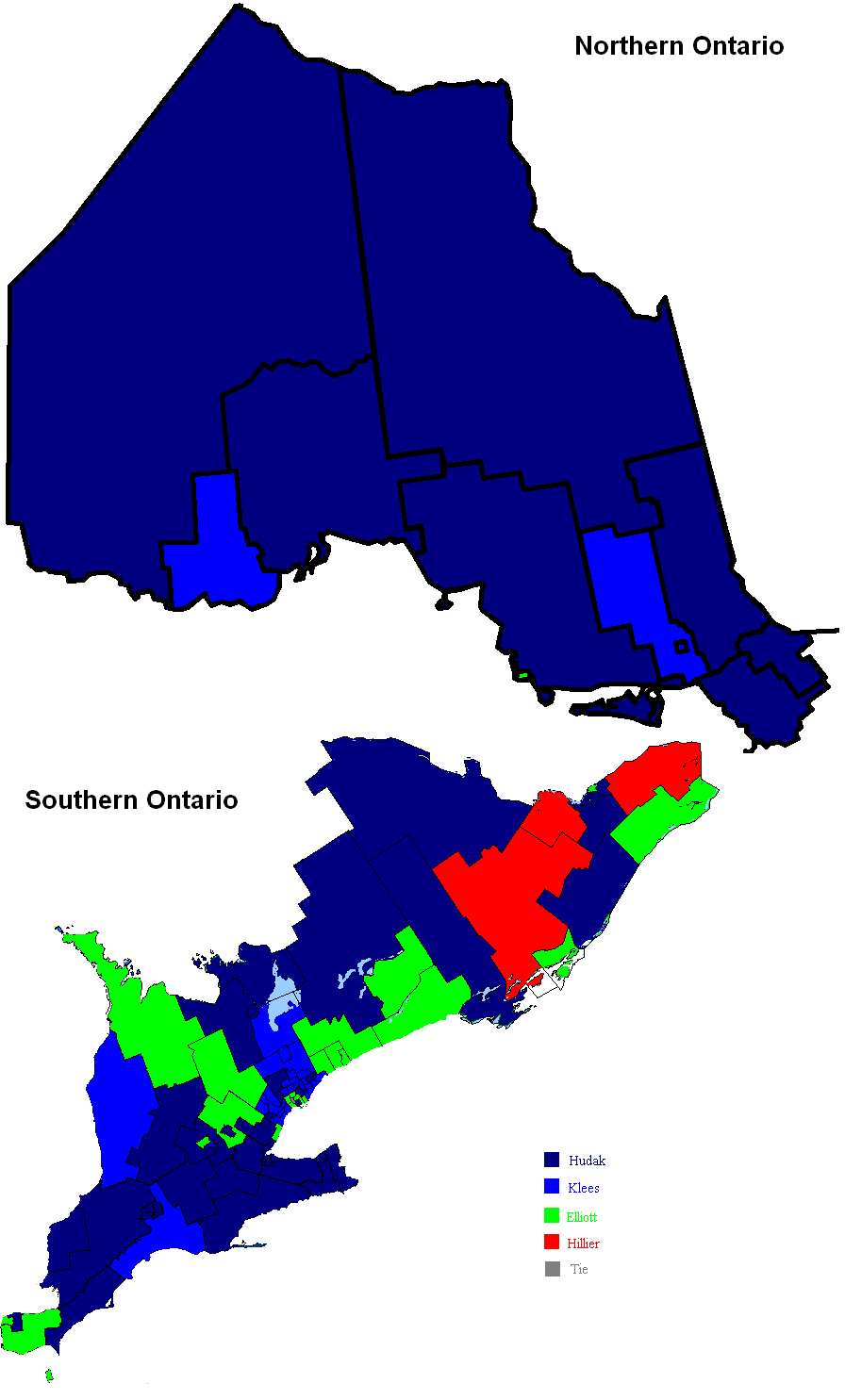
Winning candidate in each riding (first ballot). Dark blue=Hudak, Light Blue=Klees, Green=Elliott, Red=Hillier, Grey=Tie.

First Ballot
Candidate	Weighted Votes (sum of percentages in each riding)	Percentage
Tim Hudak	3,511.873	33.9
Frank Klees	3,093.770	29.9
Christine Elliott	2,728.664	26.4
Randy Hillier	1,013.694	9.8
Total	10,348	100

Movement: Hillier eliminated and endorses Hudak; prior to balloting Hillier asked his supporters to make Hudak their second choice.

Second Ballot
Candidate	Weighted Votes (sum of percentages in each riding)	Percentage	+/-
Tim Hudak	4,128.570	39.95	+6.0
Frank Klees	3,299.809	31.94	+1.9
Christine Elliott	2,903.621	28.10	+1.6
Total	10,332	100.0	

Does not include votes that were spoiled because no second choice was indicated.

Movement: Elliott eliminated

Third Ballot
Candidate	Weighted Votes (sum of percentages in each riding)	Percentage	+/-
Tim Hudak	5,606	54.25	+14.3
Frank Klees	4,644	44.94	+13.0
Total	10,332	100.0	

Does not include votes that were spoiled because no second or third choice was indicated.

== Potential candidates who did not enter ==
- Ted Arnott, 45, MPP for Wellington—Halton Hills. Told reporters "I'm not interested, nor prepared."
- John Baird, former provincial cabinet minister and MPP for Nepean, now federal Minister of Transport. Told reporters "I'm very happy with the job I have now."
- Michael Chong, 37, MP for Wellington—Halton Hills Told the press "entirely focused on the economic crisis at hand, and my job as MP for Wellington—Halton Hills."
- Tony Clement, 48, Minister of Health under Mike Harris and Ernie Eves, now federal Minister of Industry. Told reporters "I'm not contemplating that at this time", and that "I've got a pretty important job to do here in Ottawa."
- Garfield Dunlop, MPP for Simcoe North told Barrie Examiner "being the leader is a 10-year commitment. And I just don't have the contacts across the province." Endorsed Tim Hudak.
- Dean Del Mastro, 38, is a social conservative and sits in the House of Commons of Canada as MP for Peterborough.
- Julian Fantino, 67, Commissioner of the Ontario Provincial Police since 2006.
- Diane Finley, 51, federal Minister of Human Resources and Skills Development and MP for Haldimand—Norfolk. Reported in March to be considering a leadership run but did not enter the race.
- Jim Flaherty, husband of Christine Elliott and the former provincial Minister of Finance, federal Minister of Finance. Supported his wife's candidacy.
- Masood Khan is a real estate agent, former Mississauga mayoral candidate and editor of the oldest Urdu-language newspaper in Ontario. Told the Mississauga News on March 20 that he would contest the party leadership but did not register as a candidate.
- Lisa MacLeod, 34, MPP for Nepean—Carleton Announced that she is not running. Supported Tim Hudak.
- Norm Miller, 53, MPP for Parry Sound—Muskoka and son of former Premier Frank Miller. Announced on March 27 that he would not be a candidate. Endorsed Tim Hudak.
- John O'Toole, MPP for Durham since 1995. Told the Scugog Standard that he is "not considering running". Endorsed Christine Elliot.
- Jerry Ouellette, 50, MPP for Oshawa. He endorsed Frank Klees.
- Bob Runciman, MPP for Leeds—Grenville and has been the interim Leader of the Opposition in Tory's absence since 2007. On March 6, Runciman announced that he was not interested in replacing Tory. On March 20, Runciman was named interim leader of the Ontario PC Party
- Peter Shurman, MPP for Thornhill ruled himself out. Endorsed Frank Klees for leader.
- Peter Van Loan, 45, federal Public Safety Minister, MP for York—Simcoe and former president of both the Progressive Conservative Party of Ontario and the Progressive Conservative Party of Canada. Tested the waters but decided a candidacy from outside Queen's Park would not be well received.
- Jim Wilson, MPP for Simcoe—Grey former Environment minister under Ernie Eves. Expressed concerns about the cost in light of the problem past leadership candidates have had paying down their debts. Supported Tim Hudak.
- Elizabeth Witmer, 62, MPP for Kitchener—Waterloo. Served as Minister of Health Minister of the Environment, Minister of Education and Deputy Premier. Witmer was a candidate in the 2002 race that selected Eves. On March 20 she released a statement announcing her decision not to run.
- John Yakabuski, MPP for Renfrew—Nipissing—Pembroke. He told a local newspaper that, "After careful consideration, and much discussion with those closest to me, I have decided that I will not seek the position of leader of our party." Supports Tim Hudak.

== Process ==
The Ontario Progressive Conservatives use a system similar to that used by the federal Conservative Party of Canada in its leadership election. Each provincial riding association had up to 100 Electoral Votes that were allocated among the candidates by proportional representation according to the votes cast by party members within the riding. This was not a "one member one vote" system since each riding generally had equal weight. (Ridings with fewer than 100 voting party members were allocated one Electoral Vote per voting member; ridings with 100 or more voting party members were allocated 100 Electoral Votes.) Voting occurred on June 21 and 25 via a preferential ballot.

This system is designed to favour candidates who can win support across the province and win in a majority of ridings. This replicates what is necessary for a party to win a general election - though without the "first past the post" feature of elections under the Westminster system. Voters ranked their choices on a preferential ballot. In this system, if no candidate wins a majority of Electoral Votes on a ballot, then the last-place candidate is eliminated, and his/her votes are redistributed according to second-choice rankings.

There was an entry fee of $50,000 and spending limit of $750,000 but no fundraising limit; twenty per cent of the money raised by candidates was shared with the party.

Other rules required each candidate to have a nominator, a seconder, and 100 members who sign the nomination, no more than 10 of whom could live in the same riding. Candidates also had to make a $25,000 deposit, that was refundable. Furthermore, 20% of all donations over $5,000, with the exception of the first $75,000 raised, had to be given to the party; this money was exempted from the spending limit. Candidates had until Thursday, June 18, at noon to drop out of the race. Any candidate who failed to get 10% of the vote, along with the last-placed candidate, was dropped from balloting should no one candidate get a majority of votes on the first ballot. All ridings had one balloting location with the exception of the 12 largest ridings in the province.

== Timeline ==
- October 10, 2007 - 2007 provincial election, Dalton McGunity's Liberals are re-elected by large margin. Tory fails in his attempt to be elected in Don Valley West against incumbent MPP Kathleen Wynne.
- February 23, 2008 - John Tory faces a leadership review at the Annual General Meeting of the PC Party of Ontario in London and is supported by only 66.9% of delegates, virtually the same amount of support that led then federal Progressive Conservative leader Joe Clark to call a leadership convention in 1983. Tory delays announcing his intentions for three hours before declaring that he will remain as leader.
- June 29, 2008 - Tory vows to win a seat in the Ontario legislature by the end of 2008.
- September 12, 2008 - MPP Bill Murdoch is suspended from caucus after calling for Tory's resignation. He would be expelled eight days later.
- January 9, 2009 - MPP Laurie Scott of the safe Conservative seat of Haliburton—Kawartha Lakes—Brock announces her resignation in order to allow Tory to attempt to win her seat in a by-election.
- February 4, 2009 - Writ is dropped for a by-election in Haliburton—Kawartha Lakes—Brock to be held on March 5, 2009.
- March 5, 2009 - Tory loses his bid coming almost 1,000 votes behind Liberal Rick Johnson.
- March 6, 2009 - Tory announces he will resign as leader as soon as an interim leader is chosen to replace him.
- March 9, 2009 - Party executive meets to discuss the specifics of the leadership election process. Decides to hold a convention in June with a precise date and venue yet to be determined.
- March 20, 2009 - Bob Runciman chosen interim leader by caucus. John Tory's resignation goes into effect. Masood Khan tells a Mississauga newspaper that he will be a candidate.
- March 22, 2009 - The party executive sets June 27 as the date of the leadership convention and decides on the rules for the process.
- March 29, 2009 - Frank Klees issues a statement announcing his candidacy.
- March 30, 2009 - Randy Hillier announces his candidacy for the leadership.
- March 31, 2009 - Christine Elliott files her nomination papers.
- April 2, 2008 - Tim Hudak launches his candidacy.
- April 17, 2009, Noon - Deadline for candidates to enter the race.
- April 29, 2009, 5 pm - All candidates meeting at the Legion Hall, Fergus, Ontario. Hosted by Ted Arnott.
- May 14, 2009 - Deadline to sign up new members of the party.
- May 20, 2009 - All candidates debate at the Canadian Club in Toronto.
- May 21, 2009 - First official debate, London.
- May 27, 2009 - Second official debate, Sudbury.
- June 4 - Third official debate, Markham.
- June 10 - Fourth official debate, Ottawa.
- June 18 - Televised debate on TVOntario's The Agenda with Steve Paikin.
- June 21, 2009 - First voting date
- June 25, 2009 - Second voting date
- June 26, 2009 - Convention begins
- June 27, 2009 - Votes counted and new leader announced
- June 28, 2009 - Convention ends

== See also ==
- Progressive Conservative Party of Ontario leadership elections
- 1985 Progressive Conservative Party of Ontario leadership elections
- 2002 Progressive Conservative Party of Ontario leadership election
- 2004 Progressive Conservative Party of Ontario leadership election
