= Randy Hillier =

Canadian politician

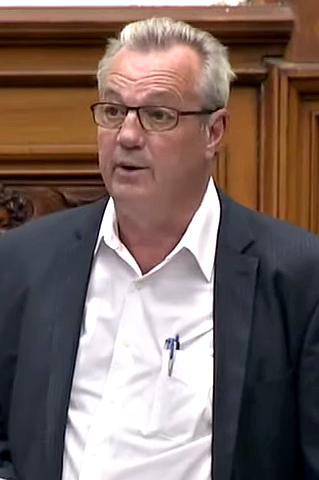

Member of the Ontario Provincial Parliament for Lanark—Frontenac—Kingston (Lanark—Frontenac—Lennox and Addington; 2007–2018)
- In office 30 October 2007 – 3 May 2022
- Preceded by: Riding formed
- Succeeded by: John Jordan

Personal details
- Born: 1958 (age 67–68) Ottawa, Ontario, Canada
- Party: Independent (2019–2022)
- Other political affiliations: PPC (2021–2022); Progressive Conservative (2007–2019)
- Occupation: Electrician; activist; politician

Randy Alexander Hillier (born 1958) is a Canadian politician who served as a member of provincial parliament (MPP) in the Legislative Assembly of Ontario from 2007 to 2022. Hillier represented the riding of Lanark—Frontenac—Kingston as an independent MPP from 2019 to 2022. This riding contains much of the dissolved riding of Lanark—Frontenac—Lennox and Addington, which he represented from 2007 to 2018. Hillier was initially elected as a Progressive Conservative (PC) Party MPP, remaining a member until he was removed in 2019. Despite announcing that he would run for election under the banner of the Ontario First Party in November 2021, Hillier announced in March 2022 that he would not seek re-election.

Hillier was a candidate in the 2009 PC leadership election and the interim leadership election in 2014. He has formerly served as the PC critic for the Attorney General, Labour, Northern Development, and Mines and Forestry in the legislature. Hillier was removed from the PC Party by Premier Doug Ford in 2019 after making disrespectful comments to parents of children with autism. He has been outspoken against the use of facemasks, vaccines, and lockdowns during the COVID-19 pandemic. He spent extensive time at the "Freedom Convoy", encouraging people to flood police phone lines during the clearance of protesters, and is currently on bail following nine charges related to his activity around the protest.

He sat as an independent MPP until the dissolution of Parliament on 3 May 2022. As of August 2022, Hillier provides landscaping and excavation services.

== Background ==
Hillier was a licensed construction electrician (licence expired 31 July 2013) with a diploma in electrical engineering technology from Algonquin College and former employee of the Canadian federal government. He lives near Perth, Ontario.

=== Property rights activism ===
Prior to serving as an MPP, in 2003, Hillier co-founded and served as the first president of the Lanark Landowners' Association. He then assisted in creation of local landowner groups in other parts of Ontario, modelled on the Lanark Landowners. In 2006, he became the first president of the 15,000-member Ontario Landowners Association (OLA), an umbrella group for these groups. The OLA was formed "...to preserve and protect the rights of property owners and to enshrine property rights within the Constitution of Canada and the laws of the province of Ontario."

Under Hillier's leadership, the landowners' groups initially engaged in acts of civil disobedience, including blocking highways, barricading government offices, staging illegal deer hunts, and publicly breaking laws that the landowners regarded as unjust.

Hillier has explained the illegal actions of the landowners as follows:

I believe in non-violent civil disobedience. I believe when a law or rule is blatantly wrong it is a part of our democratic process to challenge that law. At times civil disobedience is used to illustrate and further bring attention to the absurdity.

In 2007, when he was seeking election to the provincial legislature, Hillier was challenged to justify his participation four years earlier in an illegal deer hunt. He responded by stating,

I sent [Ontario Premier Dalton McGuinty an email containing] a picture of a dead deer saying the people of Lanark County were removing nuisance deer because the Liberal government had revoked those licences [for farmers to shoot deer that were eating their crops]. I did it four years ago... and I would do it again because I will not stand for injustice and I will not stand for farmers to be put into bankruptcy.

As well as acts of civil disobedience, the landowners conducted demonstrations at Queen's Park and Parliament Hill. Hillier's ability to attract media notice through the use of attention-grabbing rhetoric and tactics prompted one television commentator to describe him as "Don Cherry in plaid and rubber boots." On one occasion in 2006, Hillier was arrested and detained (but not charged) for trespassing during a protest at a water quality meeting in Cornwall.

After the creation of the OLA in 2006, acts of civil disobedience were replaced by attempts to influence the political system by more traditional means. Landowner-endorsed candidates ran for municipal office in many rural municipalities in the 2006 Ontario municipal elections. Hillier and other members of the OLA began to appear as witnesses before parliamentary hearings into issues affecting rural areas. (Note: For example, Hillier's appearance as a witness at the hearings of the provincial legislature into Bill 43, the Source Water Protection Act, is covered in The Landowner, Vol. 1 No. 4 (Dec/Jan 2007), p. 24. An appearance of Merle Bowes and two other OLA witnesses at the Senate Standing Committee on Agriculture and Forestry is covered in The Landowner, Vol. 2 No. 1 (June/July 2007), p. 26.)

Hillier resigned as president of the OLA in 2007 in order to run for a seat in the provincial legislature.

==== Perspective as an MPP ====
Hillier was elected to the provincial legislature in 2007. In October 2014, Hillier referred to members of the Lanark Landowners' Association as "nutbars," claiming "[w]hen I was there I tried to keep a distance from the fringe elements and the nutbars, if I can put it that way." The practice adopted by Landowners Associations of seeking original Crown patents for their land "has been, quite frankly, a problem for me as an MPP," Hillier said. "People are following this advice and not getting building permits, and then when the building inspectors visit them they're phoning me as their MPP and seeking my assistance."

=== Editorialist ===
Hillier is the author of numerous editorials on a wide range of policy issues. Between 2003 and 2010, he contributed 11 articles to Le Québécois Libre, a bilingual libertarian online journal that was published in Montreal until 2010.

Beginning in 2006, Hillier was co-publisher and co-editor of the OLA's official organ, The Landowner magazine (known since September 2019 as Landowner Voices) which is published bi-monthly. Hillier used to publish an editorial in each issue of The Landowner.

== Political career ==
=== 2007 election campaign ===
In January 2007, Hillier resigned as president of the OLA to seek the Progressive Conservative nomination in Lanark—Frontenac—Lennox and Addington in the upcoming provincial election. Some members of the party suggested that Hillier's activist past made him an unsuitable candidate, and the Toronto Star speculated that the party might disqualify him. Scott Reid, the federal MP for Lanark-Frontenac-Lennox and Addington, responded that he would be "very disappointed" if Hillier were prevented from running, adding "I can't think of anything more dangerous to our prospects [of winning in this riding]". On 5 May, Hillier won a three-way nomination against Jay Brennan and Brent Cameron. He was elected MPP for the riding on 10 October 2007, capturing 40.58 per cent of the vote and defeating Liberal candidate Ian Wilson by 820 votes.

During the election campaign, some observers questioned Hillier's fitness for elected office, given his history of civil disobedience. But this history won him some admirers as well. Similarly, his willingness to take contrarian positions (for example, announcing his denial of climate change at a mid-election meeting of the editorial board of the Ottawa Citizen) earned him approval as well as opposition. Shortly after this meeting, the Citizen's editorial board endorsed Hillier. An editorial in the paper advised voters to "[t]ake a chance on Randy Hillier" and stated that "the landowners'-rights activist is doing the right thing by running for the legislature and trying to change the system he's been battling for so very long."

=== 2007–2009: Early career as a Member of Provincial Parliament ===
Following the 2007 election, Hillier was appointed his party's critic for rural affairs.

However, it became increasingly clear that Hillier was unhappy with the leadership of PC leader John Tory. In March 2008, an article in the Ottawa Citizen reported that Hillier was considering leaving the Progressive Conservative caucus and joining the small Reform Party of Ontario. Hillier brushed aside this rumour as "void of fact."

=== 2009: Ontario PC leadership candidate ===
In early March 2009, John Tory resigned as leader of the Ontario PCs. On 30 March, Hillier announced his candidacy in the leadership race to succeed Tory. Few observers thought Hillier had a realistic chance of winning, but some media commentators speculated that he might fill the role of kingmaker.

Lacking in high-profile endorsements, Hillier instead focused his leadership bid on a series of policy announcements. These included:

- Allowing Ontarians to vote to elect their senators;
- Enacting a law, which he proposed to call the Freedom of Association and Conscience Act, which would allow health care professionals and other government-paid individuals to refuse to provide services to which, for religious or moral reasons, they were personally opposed (such as doctors and nurses refusing to perform abortions and marriage commissioners refusing to perform same-sex marriages);
- Abolishing the Ontario Human Rights Commission and allowing all legal proceedings under the province's Human Rights Code to be dealt with in the regular court system.
- Allowing the sale of beer and wine in corner stores;
- Restoration of the spring bear hunt;
- Ending the closed shop in unionized workplaces;
- Reverse the ban on the cosmetic use of pesticides;
- abolition of the province's property tax assessment agency (MPAC);
- Increasing the speed limit on Ontario highways;
- Allowing the de-amalgamation of municipalities which had been forcibly amalgamated in the 1990s;
- Cracking down on the aboriginal occupations in places like Caledonia.

Hillier placed fourth in the September 2009 leadership vote, with just under 10 per cent of the vote. However, the initial vote-count showed no clear leader among the other three candidates: Tim Hudak had won 33.9 per cent, Frank Klees had 29.9 per cent, and Christine Elliott had 26.4 per cent. Because the election was structured as a preferential vote, the ballots cast by Hillier supporters were then redistributed among the other candidates. This system meant that Hillier's prior public endorsement of Tim Hudak as his own second choice for leader was important: two-thirds of the second-preference votes of Hillier supporters went to Hudak, doubling his lead over Klees.

=== 2009–present: Political career after the leadership election ===
Following the election, Tim Hudak appointed Hillier as the party's critic for Labour, and for Northern Development, Mines and Forestry in the provincial legislature.

Regarding Hillier's support of Jack MacLaren, former Ontario Landowners Association President, to challenge sitting MPP Norm Sterling at the Annual General Meeting of the Carleton-Mississippi Mills Ontario Progressive Conservative Party Riding Association, the Globe and Mail described Hillier as a "shrewd political operator" Prior to the 2011 provincial election, Randy Hillier and federal counterpart Scott Reid introduced motions to the Legislative Assembly of Ontario and the federal House of Commons, respectively, to enshrine property rights for Ontarians in the Canadian Charter of Rights and Freedoms.

==== 2011 election ====
During the 2011 provincial election, it was reported that, as the result of a dispute over with the agency over taxes said to be owing for the sale of some land, the Canada Revenue Agency (CRA) had placed two liens with a total value of $15,000 on property owned by Hillier and his wife. Hillier responded that they were working with CRA to resolve the dispute. The dispute did not hurt Hillier's re-election effort; he won by a 10,000-vote margin.

==== 2012 ====
After the 2011 provincial election, Randy Hillier co-sponsored a bill to repeal Ontario's breed-specific restrictions on pit bull ownership. The bill was supported by members of all three parties at second reading in February 2012. Despite passing second reading and committee, Ontario's Liberal Government did not call the Bill for third reading. It died on the order table with Premier McGuinty's prorogation of the legislature.

Following revelations in January 2012 that the head of a union local in Toronto was rehired after improperly spending public funds, Hillier called on the Ontario Government to make unions receiving public money to be made more accountable.

In March 2012, Hillier introduced a bill to proclaim "Constitution Day", recognizing the day that the British North America Act and the Constitution Act were proclaimed into law.

With the support of the Canadian Taxpayers Federation, Hillier introduced a bill to strengthen the Taxpayer Protection Act introduced by the Harris government and to require all pieces of legislation be costed before they are introduced to the Ontario Legislature.

==== 2013 ====
In September 2013, Hillier was stripped of his role as the party's labour critic after the Toronto Star published an email Hillier had sent to the PC caucus raising concerns over colleague Monte McNaughton's private member's bill abrogating construction company EllisDon's 1950s-era collective bargaining agreement. The Star revealed that Hillier's concerns included that the PC Party would receive donations from Ellis Don for pushing the legislation. Hillier acknowledged that the email was his but did not comment on it. Hillier voted against the bill at second reading along with the members of the New Democratic caucus. Hudak, McNaughton and nine other members of the Tory caucus and 22 Liberals voted for the bill at second reading. All but two Liberals voted against the Bill at third reading. Hillier was not in attendance for the third reading vote.

At the end of October 2013, Hillier introduced a bill to allow provincial politicians to be recalled from public office. Hillier's bill received some public support after he recommended that it should apply to Toronto mayor Rob Ford, who was embroiled in a crack cocaine scandal.

In the fall of 2013, Hillier wrote an article for the Canadian Parliamentary Review detailing his ideas to reform Ontario's Legislature to "empower" Members of Provincial Parliament.

==== Interim leadership bid ====
Hillier stood for the position of interim leader of the party following Tim Hudak's resignation in the aftermath of the 2014 provincial election. Hillier advocated moving power out of the hands of the leader and having more decisions made by caucus, including the selection of House Leader and Whip. He was defeated by Jim Wilson. Prior to the caucus meeting where the vote for interim leader was held, Wilson had dismissed Hillier's bid as a stunt, saying "He's crazy... he has consistently betrayed the trust of caucus."

==== 2018 ====
In February 2018, Hillier filed a formal complaint against former Ontario PC Leader and MPP Patrick Brown during the leadership race. "I've known Patrick Brown to lie just about every time he opens his mouth" Hillier told reporters, he "engaged in dirty and crooked politics". "He purposely and willfully lied to the people of Ontario." An investigation found no evidence to support Hillier's allegations that Brown failed to disclose gifts of travel. Brown publicly responded calling Hillier's allegations "garbage," and "fabricated".

==== 2019 ====
Hillier was suspended from the PC caucus by Premier Doug Ford on 20 February 2019 after making what Ford characterized as "disrespectful comments to parents of children with autism." Hillier denied the allegation, and said he was ousted for other reasons. A letter sent by the PC Party President was released blaming him for a lack of commitment to the caucus. He was subsequently removed from the PC caucus on 15 March 2019.

=== 2020–present: opponent of COVID-19 measures and laws ===
At the outbreak of the COVID-19 pandemic, Hillier was sitting as an independent MPP after being removed from the PC caucus in 2019. He has been skeptical of the pandemic and has been a vocal proponent of ending the emergency measures put in place by the Ontario government, such as lockdowns, stay-at-home orders, and advice regarding social distancing and use of face masks.

In June 2020, he took part in a rally protesting the COVID-19 lockdown in Ontario at Queen's Park, and was later condemned by Premier Doug Ford who described Hillier's participation in the rally as "totally irresponsible" and said it goes against "what everybody has been working for."

In October 2020, Kingston public health officials sent a letter to Hillier expressing concerns regarding his spreading of misinformation about the pandemic. Hillier refused to say whether he thought the pandemic was real, said he was anti-mask and likened the pandemic to a bad flu season. He had also asserted on Twitter that public health officials were guilty of crimes against humanity.

On 26 November 2020, Hillier organized an anti-COVID-19 lockdown rally at Queen's Park. Unlike the first such rally that Hillier organized (on 21 October), this rally led to Hillier being issued a court summons by police, for violating the lockdown restrictions in place in Toronto at the time, which limited outdoor gatherings to 10 people. His court date was set for 7 January 2021.

On 29 December 2020, Hillier tweeted a Christmas photo of a gathering at his home with 15 people from multiple households. At the time, Ontario was in a province-wide lockdown and the number of people allowed to gather indoors had been restricted to only members of a family living in the same household.

On 24 January 2021, Hiller attended an in-person service at a Waterloo, Ontario church, during a time when such services were prohibited by provincial law due to the pandemic.

On 25 February 2021, Hillier tweeted that "there is no (COVID-19) pandemic & never was, we were duped", and in a separate tweet urged his followers that "we must start shaming those who wear a mask, as they shame others, the masks are coercing us to live their lie." Hillier was blocked from Twitter for 24 hours for violating its terms of service, and when he returned he blamed "trolls and bots" for his temporary ban.

On 1 April 2021, Hillier tweeted an image of Adolf Hitler with a caption that read "The Third ....wave. Everyone who has ever been to the sea, knows there is no end to waves. Its only 28 days this time. Truth does not mind being questioned. Lies do not like to be challenged. #onpoli #WeAreLivingaLie #nomorelockdowns", drawing a comparison between Ontario's COVID-19 lockdowns (a 28-day province-wide lockdown had been announced to begin on 3 April 2021, to combat the so-called "third wave" of the province's pandemic) and the fascist government of Nazi Germany under Hitler. Hillier's tweet coincided with the Jewish holiday Passover, and the Centre for Israel and Jewish Affairs, a Canadian Jewish advocacy group, criticized Hillier's insensitivity and drawing of "false equivalencies" between lockdown measures and the Holocaust. He was also condemned by Kingston and the Islands MPP Ian Arthur and MP Mark Gerretsen, the latter calling for Hillier's removal from office.

On 8 April 2021, Hillier was billed as the special guest speaker at a "Mask Burning" event at the South Branch Bistro, Kemptville, Ontario, organized by No More Lock Downs Canada.

On 25 April 2021, Hillier attended a church service in Aylmer, Ontario at Church of God Restoration. Hillier, along with Hastings—Lennox and Addington MP Derek Sloan (who had also been expelled from his own Conservative caucus after receiving a donation from a white supremacist) attended the event without wearing face masks or maintaining physical distancing, as shown in a video of the event. Four individuals were charged with violating the Reopening Ontario Act, including two that fit the description of Hillier and Sloan. Those charged have been summoned to court, with scheduled appearances in June.

The local governments of several municipalities within Hillier's riding have passed motions condemning Hillier and asking the provincial government to sanction him in any way possible. Motions to this effect have been passed in South Frontenac, Central Frontenac, Perth, Smiths Falls, Carleton Place, and the Kingston, with the latter city council's motion calling for an investigation from the Ontario Integrity Commissioner.

As of 5 May 2021, Hillier has been charged eight times for his defiance of the Reopening Ontario Act, including for hosting an anti-lockdown protest and march in Belleville on 16 April. According to a Facebook post, Hillier plans to fight all charges.

In October 2021, families of several people in Ontario accused Hillier of spreading fake news and unauthorized use of their relatives photos and personal details to promote his anti-vaccination views. Hillier tweeted the images of 11 deceased people, suggesting they died or suffered from a "permanent adverse reaction shortly after receiving their first or second dose of the COVID-19 vaccine," contrary to what their obituaries and relatives said. On 28 October, the Ontario legislature unanimously condemned and called for a public apology for Hillier's "disreputable conduct", in particular the post misrepresenting several people's deaths. As of that time, Hillier had violated the legislature's rules regarding the use of face masks four times.

On 15 November, Hillier falsely claimed on his Facebook page that Public Health Ontario (PHO) had undertaken investigations into "37 possible deaths" caused by COVID-19 vaccines, according to a 2021 Global News article on the role of COVID-19 misinformation has contributed to "radicalizing Canadians".

Hillier went camping with people who displayed a Diagolon flag; Diagolon is a Canadian-founded neo-fascist group linked to the convoy protests.

==== Freedom Convoy protests ====
During the Canada convoy protests' occupation of Ottawa in January and February 2022, Hillier claims to have spent much of three weeks among the protesters.

On 25 January, Hillier posted a tweet that referred to federal Minister of Transportation Omar Alghabra as a "terrorist." In a separate tweet, Hillier called on the RCMP to open an investigation into Justin Trudeau, whom he accused of an "act of domestic terrorism" by depriving Canadians of food and essentials in the winter (a reference to perceived supply chain issues caused by the vaccine mandate for cross-border truckers, an inciting reason for the convoy protest). Public Safety Minister Marco Mendicino urged Twitter to remove the post that referred to Alghabra, as Islamophobic hate speech. The provincial Liberal and New Democratic Party leaders called for increased sanctions against Hillier, beyond the "disreputable conduct" mechanism previously used.

Hillier called for "dialogue" with the occupiers, on 8 February and attended a press conference on 9 February, reiterating his support for the convoy.

On Twitter, Hillier claimed that protesters would leave Ottawa shortly after a press conference to be held at 1:00 PM on 19 February. He claims that police blocked him from attending the conference. He urged supporters to "keep calling" and jam the phone lines of the Ottawa Police. It was compared it to the "counselling to commit mischief" charge applied to protest leaders like Tamara Lich, suggesting Hillier should be jailed.

On 22 February, the Legislative Assembly of Ontario unanimously passed a motion that authorized the Speaker to not recognize him in the legislature until he publishes written apologies for his actions and the Speaker is satisfied of their sincerity. The motion stated that "this House expresses its disapproval of, and dissociates itself from, continued disreputable conduct by the Member for Lanark-Frontenac-Kingston, most specifically his use of social media to make racist and discriminatory statements about a federal cabinet minister and for publishing social media posts insinuating a call to violence."

On 28 March, Hillier turned himself in to the Ottawa Police, while facing nine charges against him due to his actions at the protest: one count of assaulting a peace or public officer (allegedly checking an officer with his shoulder and hip), two counts of obstructing or resisting a public officer, one count of obstructing or resisting someone aiding a public or peace officer, three counts of counselling an uncommitted indictable offence, two of them considered mischief, and two counts of mischief or obstructing property exceeding $5,000. He was granted bail and released later that day, on the conditions that he would avoid the general area of downtown Ottawa, not associate with any of the protest organizers, and refrain from posting on social media about the convoy and anti-vaccine or mask mandates. The justice of the peace at his bail hearing noted that his social media activity "poses a substantial risk."

In November 2024, all charges were stayed against Hillier because of excessive delay pursuant to the Jordan ceiling of which 30-months ceiling to protect the right to be tried within a reasonable time. Taking into account 65 days of defence delay and 40 days of delay for exceptional circumstances, Hillier had been waiting for over 31 months.

=== 2022 general election ===
In November 2021, Hillier announced his intention to run for re-election under the banner of the People's Party of Canada's Ontario wing. Hillier launched the Ontario First Party (OFP) on 4 December 2021 as an unregistered provincial political party. The party began a registration process with Elections Ontario on 17 December 2021, with Paul Maletta requesting the registration. While the party name was approved on 19 January 2022, it remains an unregistered party. There were also plans to run candidates in the 2022 Ontario general election, though none were ultimately confirmed.

Initially, there were attempts by the federal People's Party of Canada (PPC) to register the name "People's Party of Ontario" with Elections Ontario. The elections agency rejected the name five times due to its similarity to the existing Peoples Political Party, which has been registered since 2011 by perennial candidate Kevin Clarke. In March 2021, the PPC and Clarke discussed Clarke relinquishing his rights to the name in exchange for running under the PPC banner. The discussions, while initially productive, later broke down after Clarke posted about the matter on social media and added other people to his email conversations with the PPC.

On 3 March 2022, Hillier announced by a video posted on social media that he had decided not to run for re-election in the 2022 provincial election, saying "our political system is broken... there is no sense spending any more time trying to fix a broken system from within when the problem lies without." This would have been his first attempt at running against a Progressive Conservative, instead of running as a PC candidate. The website and social media for the Ontario First Party were shut down.

The Populist Party Ontario (PPO) was announced as an unregistered provincial political party upon the closure of the Ontario First Party (OFP). The party began a registration process with Elections Ontario on 17 December 2021, with Shelley Batcules requesting the registration. The party name was approved on 24 January 2022, and then the party itself was officially registered on 9 May 2022. The OFP website redirected to the Populist Party Ontario website, where a few references to the OFP remain.

On 12 May 2022, Hillier's daughter Chelsea Hillier joined the PPO to contest his seat in Lanark—Frontenac—Kingston.

== Other controversies ==
In 2017 allegations were made against Hillier for violating the internal conduct policies of Tay Valley Township and the Occupational Health and Safety Act. Following a three-month investigation Hillier was found to have harassed municipal staff in Tay Valley. The township investigation wrote that Hillier "unfairly called into question the competence and proficiency of Township staff and undermined their integrity." A letter from the township Chief Administrative Officer said there was a pattern of criticism and that the MPP had been "cautioned" about this "type of behaviour" in March. The letter stated, "Much of the information upon which you rely for your criticisms is inaccurate and the commentary about staff is disparaging. The impact of this behaviour is made even more harmful by the position and authority that you hold as MPP."

In June 2020, Hillier came under fire for appearing to trivialize Minister Ahmed Hussen's experience with racism, when in response to a CTV article where Hussen discussed experiences of prejudice while shopping, Hillier tweeted "A guilty conscience?" The tweet has since been deleted but has been met with sharp criticism online and multiple accusations of racism, including by Andrea Horwath who commented "At a time when Black people are protesting for their lives, you're denying the reality of Black, Indigenous and racialized people."

Hillier went camping with people who displayed a Diagolon flag in 2022.

== Public profile ==
After numerous controversial posts, Twitter banned Hillier from its platform on 8 March 2022. Hillier shared a screen capture of the ban on his Instagram, suggesting the ban was temporary, for 7 days. The cited tweet claimed that Pfizer's COVID-19 vaccine was a "killer medicine".

== Electoral record ==
2018 Ontario general election: Lanark—Frontenac—Kingston
Party	Candidate	Votes	%	±%
Progressive Conservative	Randy Hillier	26,194	52.03	+5.11
New Democratic	Ramsey Hart	15,339	30.47	+12.29
Liberal	Amanda Pulker-Mok	5,359	10.64	–17.33
Green	Anita Payne	2,410	4.79	–2.09
Libertarian	Steve Gebhardt	601	1.19	–
Independent	John A. McEwen	440	0.87	–
Total valid votes		50,343	99.07	
Total rejected, unmarked and declined ballots		473	0.93	
Turnout		50,816	62.03	
Eligible voters		81,925		
Progressive Conservative notional hold		Swing		▲3.59
Source: Elections Ontario

2014 Ontario general election: Lanark—Frontenac—Lennox and Addington
Party	Candidate	Votes	%	±%
Progressive Conservative	Randy Hillier	21,966	43.52	–6.60
Liberal	Bill MacDonald	15,037	29.79	+1.92
New Democratic	Dave Parkhill	10,184	20.18	+2.09
Green	Cam Mather	3,283	6.50	+2.59
Total valid votes		50,470	98.81	
Total rejected, unmarked and declined ballots		606	1.19	+0.84
Turnout		51,076	53.95	+3.52
Eligible voters		94,674		
Progressive Conservative hold		Swing		–4.26
Source: Elections Ontario

2011 Ontario general election: Lanark—Frontenac—Lennox and Addington
Party	Candidate	Votes	%	±%	Expenditures
Progressive Conservative	Randy Hillier	22,457	50.12	+9.54	$65,499.77
Liberal	Bill MacDonald	12,490	27.88	–10.88	$18,494.07
New Democratic	Dave Parkhill	8,104	18.09	+5.56	$12,232.90
Green	Nancy Matte	1,754	3.91	–3.18	$8,407.12
Total valid votes		44,805	99.65	–	$106,088.50
Total rejected, unmarked and declined ballots		157	0.35	–0.25	
Turnout		44,962	50.43	–1.65	
Eligible voters		89,150			
Progressive Conservative hold		Swing		+10.21	
Source: Elections Ontario

2007 Ontario general election: Lanark—Frontenac—Lennox and Addington
Party	Candidate	Votes	%	Expenditures
Progressive Conservative	Randy Hillier	18,213	40.58	$63,966.57
Liberal	Ian Wilson	17,393	38.76	$58,029.71
New Democratic	Ross Sutherland	5,623	12.53	$13,994.38
Green	Rolly Montpellier	3,186	7.10	$5,548.28
Family Coalition	Stella Postma	462	1.03	$180.41
Total valid votes/expense limit		44,877	99.40	$93,616.56
Total rejected, unmarked and declined ballots		271	0.60	
Turnout		45,148	52.08	
Eligible voters		86,682		
Progressive Conservative pickup new district.				
Source: Elections Ontario

== Post-political career ==
After his political career, Randy has opened Randy Hillier Contracting & Consulting, providing a wide array of landscaping and excavation services, snow plowing, as well as assistance with building permits.
