= Elmgrove, Ontario =

Elmgrove, Ontario may refer to:

- Elmgrove, Lanark County, Ontario
- Elmgrove, Simcoe County, Ontario
