= Tay River =

River in Canada

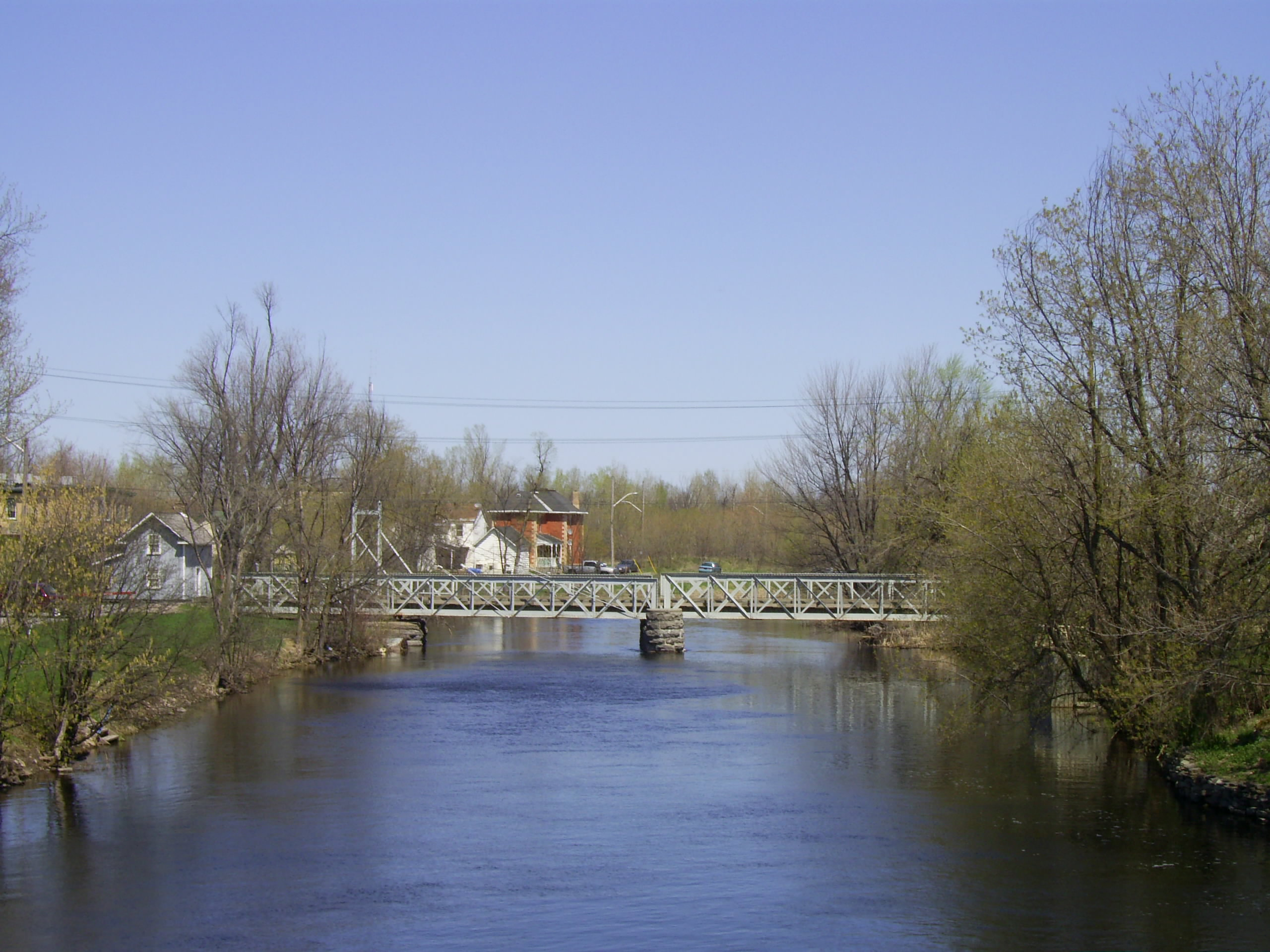
- Tay River in Perth

Location
- Country: Canada
- Province: Ontario
- Region: Eastern Ontario
- County: Lanark

Physical characteristics
- Source: Bobs Lake
  - location: Lanark Highlands
  - coordinates: 44°45′34″N 76°31′21″W
  - elevation: 162 m (531 ft)
- Mouth: Lower Rideau Lake, Rideau River
  - location: Port Elmsley
  - coordinates: 44°52′43″N 76°06′46″W
  - elevation: 125 m (410 ft)
- Length: 95 km (59 mi)
- Basin size: 850 km^{2} (330 sq mi)

Basin features
- Progression: Rideau River→ Ottawa River→ St. Lawrence River→ Gulf of St. Lawrence
- River system: Ottawa River basin

The Tay River is a river in Lanark County in Eastern Ontario, Canada. It is in the Saint Lawrence River drainage basin and is a left tributary of the Rideau River.

The Tay River watershed, covering a drainage area in excess of 800 square kilometers, is the westmost of the 6 recognized subwatersheds managed by the Rideau Valley Conservation Authority.

== Course ==
This river starts at Bobs Lake and leaves the lake, controlled by a weir, near the community of Bolingbroke in geographic South Sherbrooke Township, part of the municipality of Tay Valley. It heads northeast, passes under Lanark County Road 36, reaches Christie Lake and passes there into geographic Bathurst Township. It continues northeast, passes under Lanark County Road 6, and divides into two channels; the right channel is known as Scotts Snye. The river then travels through the community of Glen Tay, continuing to Perth. The river splits into two main channels as it flows through downtown Perth. The two channels have recombined by the time it leaves Perth and continues to the Rideau River, which drains via the Ottawa River into the Saint Lawrence River.

The river is 95 kilometres (59 miles) in length and drains an area of 850 square kilometres (330 square miles). A canal connects the river to the Tay Canal, and Rideau Canal systems at Beveridge Bay on Lower Rideau Lake.

== Lakes in the Tay watershed ==
=== Top of Watershed (above north-south railroad line from Oconto to Tichborne) ===
Abbott, Barton, Carnahan, Clow, Danby, Duncan, Eagle, Elbow, Leggat, Little Beaver, Little Mud, Long, Miller, Oconto, Scanlin, Spruce, Watson

=== Middle watershed (between Oconto/Tichborne line and Christie Lake) ===
Atwood, Beaver, Bobs & Crow, Buck Bay, Burns Pond, Christie, Crosby, Davern, Deer, Doran, Farrell, Green Bay, Lake of the Hills, Little Crosby, Little Rock, Little Silver, Little Twins, Lynn, Mud Bay, O’Brien, Pike, Rainbow, Rock (north), Sucker, Thompson Pond, Victoria, Weatherhead

=== Below Christie Lake ===
Andrew, Doctor McLaren, Mills, Mud, Otty, Rock (south), Thoms Mud

== History ==
The Tay River was formed during the retreat of the Champlain Sea after the last ice age. The name given to it by the Mississauga First Nation, who controlled its territory at the time of the arrival of the first European settlers, appears to have not been recorded. They used its territory for hunting, especially in the winter, and likely harvested manoomin (wild rice) on some of its lakes, for instance Christie Lake. Early European settlers called it the Pike River; the name Tay replaced it at some time during the arrival of many Scottish settlers after the founding of the Perth Military Settlement in 1816, doubtless in reference to the River Tay in Scotland. The new name was already clearly established during the construction of numerous mills on the river in the 1820s, and the Tay Canal in the 1830s.

Mills on the Tay, the Tay Canal, and more broadly the resultant access to the Rideau Canal system provided important commercial connections from Frontenac and Lanark Counties to Ottawa and markets beyond, in particular for logging. Dams on the upper Tay created lakes (e.g. Bobs Lake) that were reservoirs of water for the Rideau Canal at the time, and are important to cottagers and seasonal residents today.

Following municipal amalgamation in Ontario in 1998, the river has provided its name to the municipality of Tay Valley, Ontario, even though the municipality neither wholly contains, nor is wholly contained by, the Tay River watershed.

== See also ==
- List of rivers of Ontario

== Sources ==
- Map 6 (PDF) (Map). 1 : 700,000. Official road map of Ontario. Ministry of Transportation of Ontario. 2010-01-01.
- Restructured municipalities - Ontario map #5 (Map). Restructuring Maps of Ontario. Ontario Ministry of Municipal Affairs and Housing. 2006. Archived from the original on 2020-05-11.
- "Tay River Sub-watershed" (JPG). Friends of the Tay Watershed Association.
