= Lanark—Frontenac—Kingston =

Lanark—Frontenac—Kingston could refer to:

- Lanark—Frontenac—Kingston (federal electoral district)
- Lanark—Frontenac—Kingston (provincial electoral district)
