= Lanark—Frontenac—Lennox and Addington (provincial electoral district) =

Coordinates: 44.8°N 76.5°W

Ontario electoral district
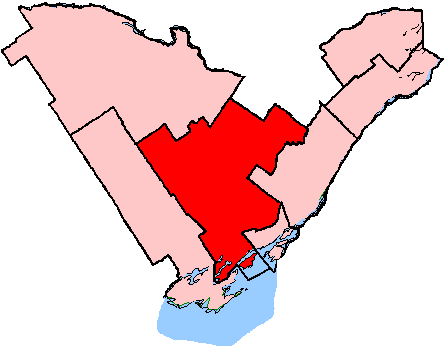
- Lanark—Frontenac—Lennox and Addington shown within the Eastern Ontario region

Defunct provincial electoral district
- Legislature: Legislative Assembly of Ontario
- District created: 2006
- District abolished: 2018
- First contested: 2007
- Last contested: 2014

Demographics
- Population (2011): 119,617
- Electors (2006): 88,185
- Area (km²): 9,639
- Census division(s): Frontenac, Lanark, Lennox and Addington
- Census subdivision(s): Addington Highlands, Beckwith, Carleton Place, Central Frontenac, Drummond/North Elmsley, Greater Napanee, Lanark Highlands, Loyalist, Montague, North Frontenac, Perth, Smiths Falls, South Frontenac, Stone Mills, Tay Valley

Lanark—Frontenac—Lennox and Addington was a provincial electoral district in Ontario, Canada, which was represented in the Legislative Assembly of Ontario from 2007 to 2018. The new riding was created in 2003 from parts of Hastings—Frontenac—Lennox and Addington and Lanark—Carleton ridings.

In the 2007 provincial election, the MPPs representing the two predecessor ridings of Hastings—Frontenac—Lennox and Addington and Lanark—Carleton chose to run, respectively, in the newly created ridings of Prince Edward—Hastings to the west of the new riding, and Carleton—Mississippi Mills to its east. As a result, the riding had no incumbent, and was contested by candidates who had never previously held office. Progressive Conservative Party of Ontario (PC) candidate Randy Hillier won by a narrow margin of less than one thousand votes, one of only three victories for a PC candidate in a non-incumbent-held riding.

Hillier would go on to win two additional victories in Lanark-Frontenac-Lennox and Addington; he was the only MPP to represent the district during its eleven-year existence.

The district was abolished at the time of the 2018 general election; the Lanark County and Frontenac components of the riding were redistributed to the new district of Lanark—Frontenac—Kingston, while Lennox and Addington County was redistributed to the new district of Hastings—Lennox and Addington.

== Members of Provincial Parliament ==
Lanark—Frontenac—Lennox and Addington
Assembly	Years	Member	Party
Riding created from Hastings—Frontenac—Lennox and Addington and Lanark—Carleton
39th	2007–2011	Randy Hillier	Progressive Conservative
40th	2011–2014	Randy Hillier	Progressive Conservative
41st	2014–2018	Randy Hillier	Progressive Conservative
Riding dissolved into Lanark—Frontenac—Kingston and Hastings—Lennox and Addington

== Election results ==
2014 Ontario general election
Party	Candidate	Votes	%	±%
Progressive Conservative	Randy Hillier	21,966	43.52	−6.60
Liberal	Bill MacDonald	15,037	29.79	+1.91
New Democratic	David Parkhill	10,184	20.18	+2.09
Green	Cam Mather	3,283	6.50	+2.59
Total valid votes		50,470	100.0	+12.48
Progressive Conservative hold		Swing		−4.26
Source(s) Elections Ontario (2014). "Official result from the records – 041, Lanark—Frontenac—Lennox and Addington" (PDF).

2011 Ontario general election
Party	Candidate	Votes	%	±%	Expenditures
Progressive Conservative	Randy Hillier	22,457	50.12	+9.54	$ 65,499.77
Liberal	Bill MacDonald	12,490	27.88	−10.88	18,494.07
New Democratic	David Parkhill	8,104	18.09	+5.56	12,232.90
Green	Nancy Matte	1,754	3.91	−3.19	8,407.12
Total valid votes / expense limit		44,805	100.0	−0.16	$ 106,088.50
Total rejected, unmarked and declined ballots		157	0.35	−0.25	
Turnout		44,962	50.43	−1.65	
Eligible voters		89,150		+2.85	
Progressive Conservative hold		Swing		+10.21	
Source(s) "Official return from the records / Rapport des registres officiels - Lanark—Frontenac—Lennox and Addington" (PDF). "2011 Candidate Campaign Returns (CR-1)". & "2011 Constituency Association Returns (CR-3)". Elections Ontario.

2007 Ontario general election
Party	Candidate	Votes	%	Expenditures
Progressive Conservative	Randy Hillier	18,213	40.58	$ 63,966.57
Liberal	Ian Wilson	17,393	38.76	58,029.71
New Democratic	Ross Sutherland	5,623	12.53	13,994.38
Green	Rolly Montpellier	3,186	7.10	5,548.28
Family Coalition	Stella Postma	462	1.03	180.41
Total valid votes/expense limit		44,877	100.0	$ 93,616.56
Total rejected ballots		271	0.60	
Turnout		45,148	52.08	
Eligible voters		86,682		
Source(s) "Summary of Valid Votes Cast for Each Candidate – October 10, 2007 General Election" (PDF). "Statistical Summary – General Election 2007" (PDF). Elections Ontario. "2007 Candidate Campaign Returns (CR-1)".

== 2007 electoral reform referendum ==
2007 Ontario electoral reform referendum
Side	Votes	%
First Past the Post	29,290	66.7
Mixed member proportional	14,656	33.3
Total valid votes	43,946	100.0
