= Port Elmsley Drive-In theatre =

Drive-in theatre in Ontario, Canada

Port Elmsley Drive-In Theatre
- Location: Port Elmsley, Ontario, Canada
- Coordinates: 44.88780°N 76.13292°W
- Type: Drive-in theatre

Website
- www.portelmsleydrivein.com

The Port Elmsley Drive-In theatre is a drive-in theatre located near Port Elmsley, between Perth and Smiths Falls, Ontario, Canada.

== History ==
The drive-in was originally built on ten acres (4.0 ha) of swamp land, supposedly won in a poker game. Construction finished in 1953, after having trucked in tens of thousands of tonnes of gravel, to level the ground. Financial troubles arose in 2018, and the cinema was planning on closing, however, the COVID-19 pandemic boosted its sales and allowed it to stay open.
