= John K. Robertson =

John K. Roberson
- Born: John Kellock Robertson; 1885; Perth, Ontario, Canada
- Died: June 24, 1958 (aged 72–73); Canada

Academic background
- Education: University of Toronto

Academic work
- Discipline: Physics
- Sub-discipline: Medical physics Radiology physics
- Institutions: Imperial College London; Queen's University at Kingston

John Kellock Robertson, FRSC (1885 – June 24, 1958) was a Canadian physicist who taught at Queen's University at Kingston. A pioneer of physics teaching to medical students, he was president of the Royal Society of Canada for 1944–1945.

== Early life and education ==
Born in Perth, Ontario, Robertson was educated at the University of Toronto.

== Career ==
Robertson joined Queen's University at Kingston as a lecturer in 1909, where he remained his whole career, with the exception of periods of research in England at the Cavendish Laboratory and Imperial College London. He was named a fellow of the American Physical Society in 1921.

== Personal life ==
Robertson retired to England in 1951 and died in Canada in 1958.
