= Tay Canal =

Canal in Canada

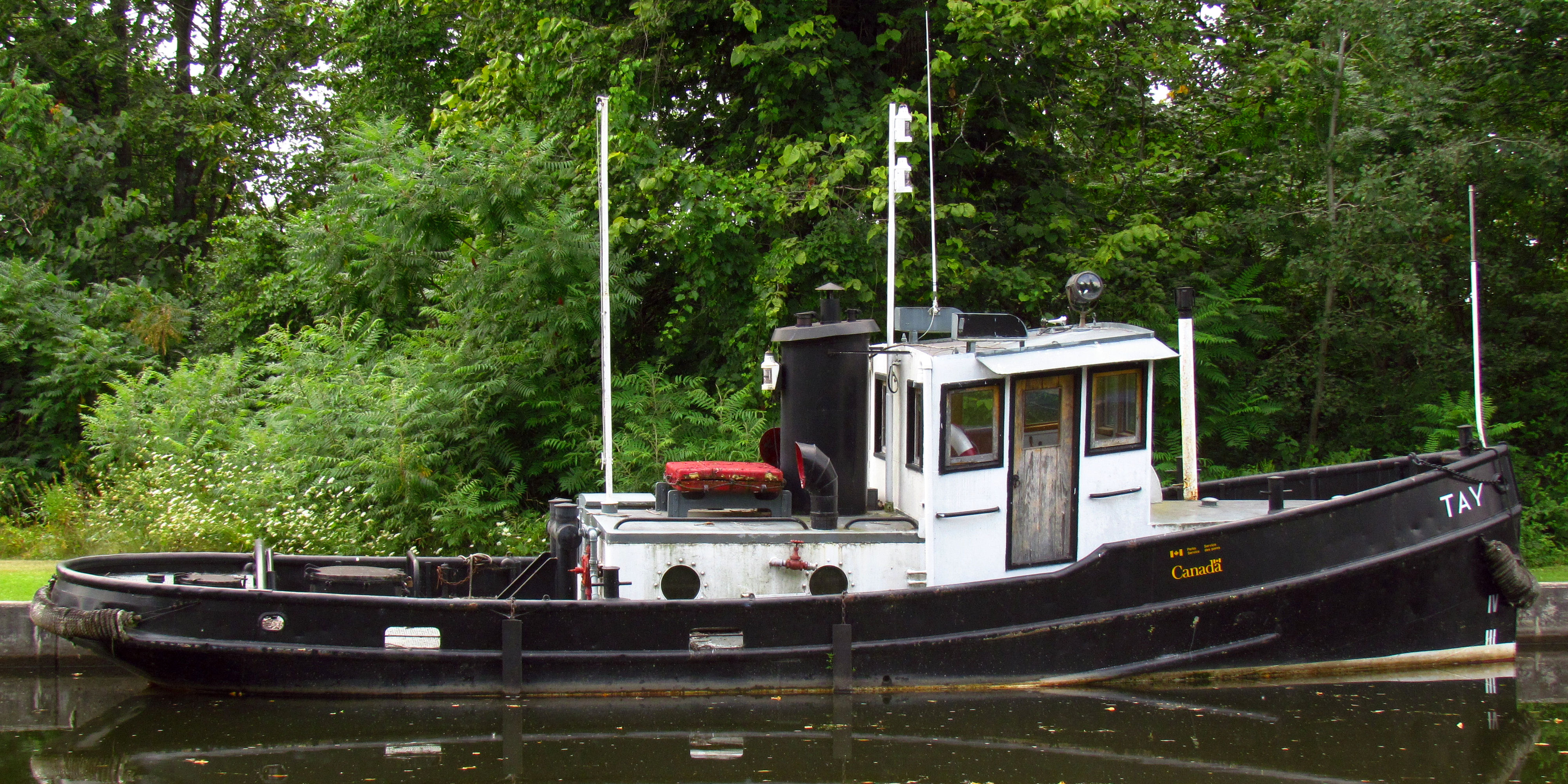
- Tugboat Tay, owned by Parks Canada, at Upper Beveridges Lock, Tay Canal
- Country: Canada

Specifications
- Length: 9.8 km (6.1 miles)

Geography
- Direction: Southeast
- Start point: Tay River
- End point: Rideau River
- Beginning coordinates: 44.8830°N 76.1594°W
- Ending coordinates: 44°52′25″N 76°08′11″W

The Tay Canal is the portion of the Tay River in the eastern Ontario region, providing a connection between the town of Perth and the Rideau Canal at Beveridge Bay on Lower Rideau Lake. The canal is 9.8 km (6.1 miles) in length and is operated today by Parks Canada as part of their Rideau Canal operations. At the entrance to the Tay Canal are two locks, Upper and Lower Beveridge Locks, which provide a total lift of 7.6 m (25 ft).

== History ==
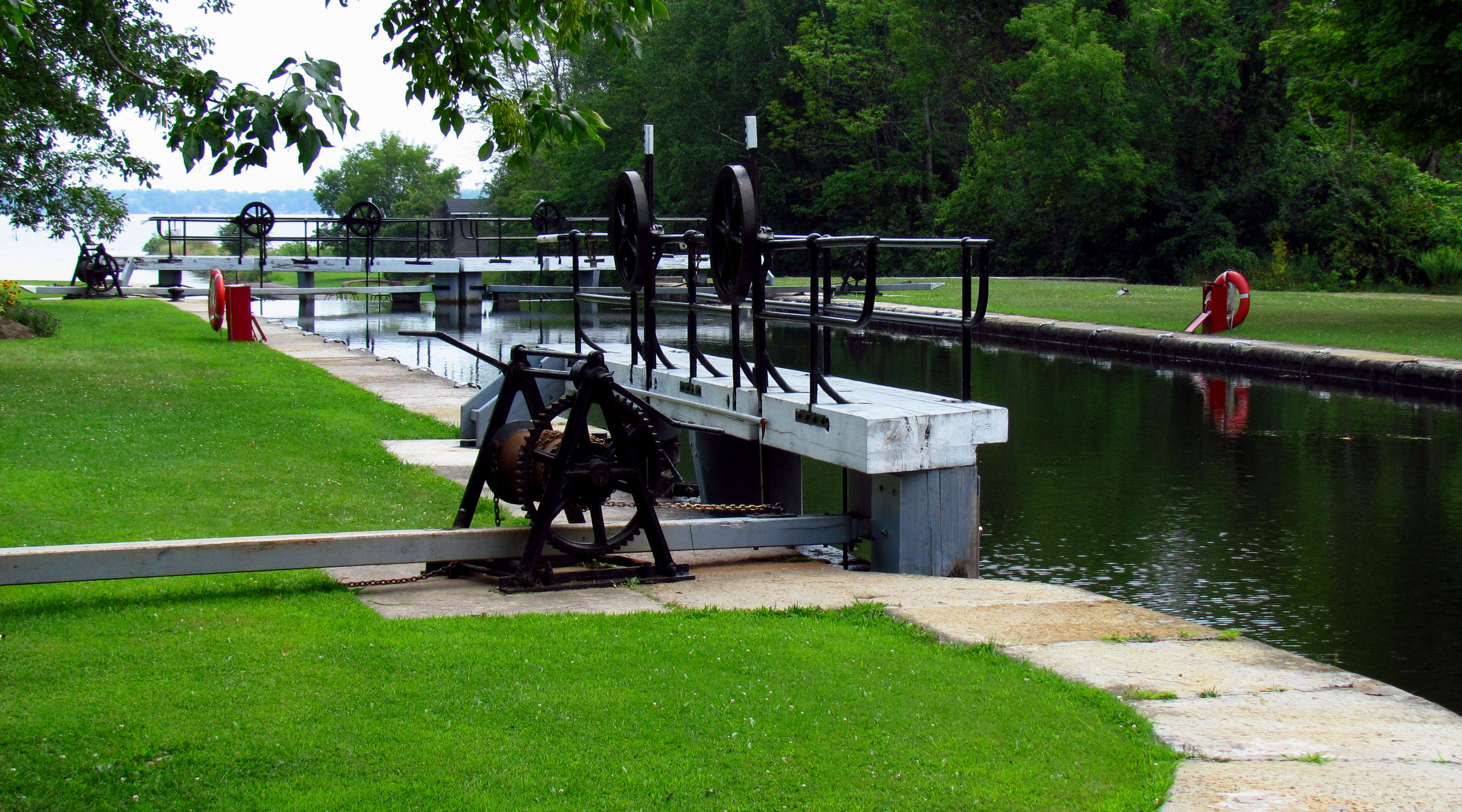
Lower Beveridges Lock

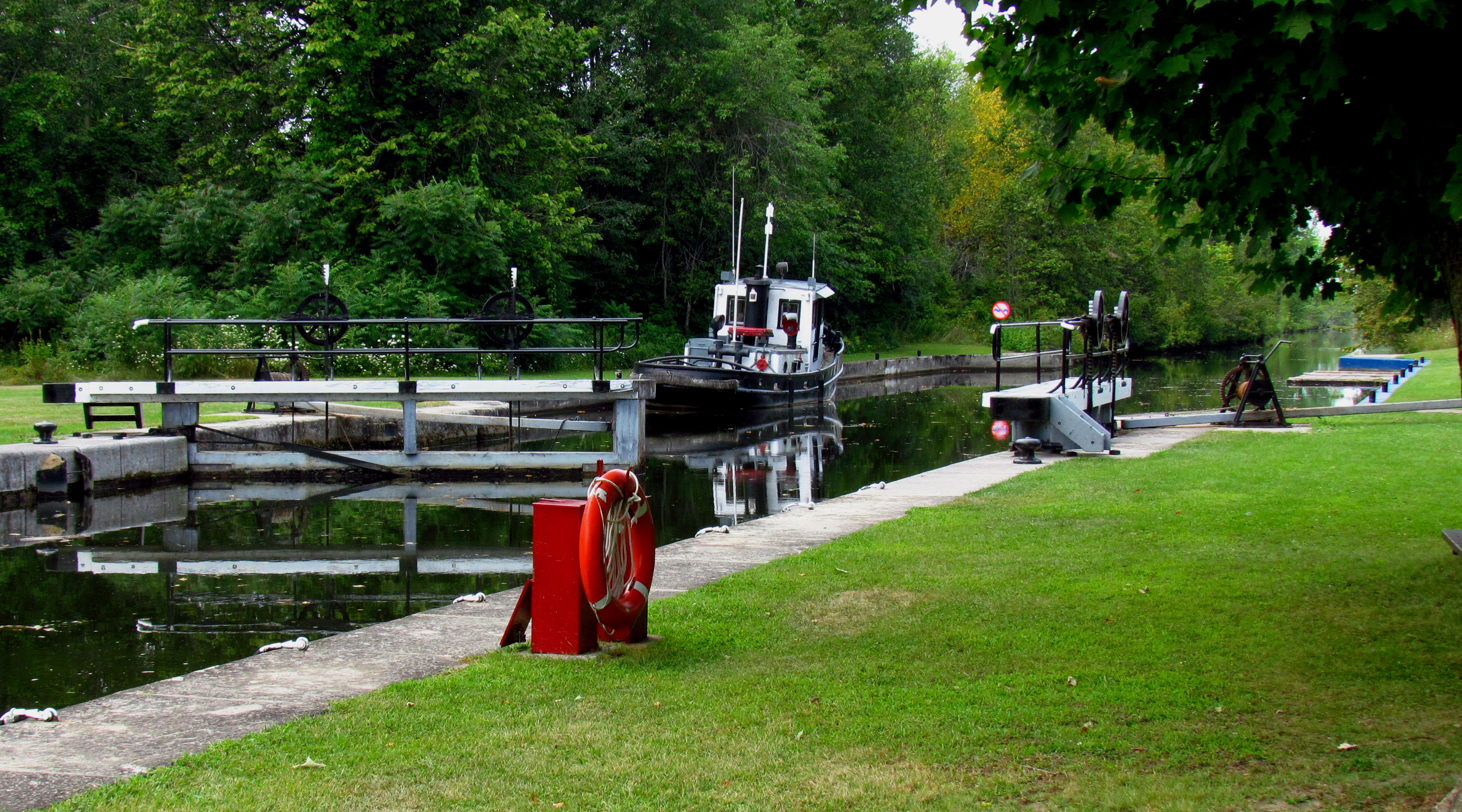
Upper Beveridges Lock

=== First Tay Canal ===
Proposals to make the Tay into a navigable waterway date to 1824, when local Perth entrepreneur William Morris started to lobby for this. When the construction of the Rideau Canal started in 1826, Perth business interests hoped that this would include the Tay, but the Superintending Engineer for the Rideau Canal, Lt. Colonel John By had no mandate to build any branch canals. So it was decided to form a company to build the Tay Canal. On 16 March 1831, legislation to form the Tay Navigation Company was passed.

In 1831, John Jackson, an ex-Sergeant in the army and a miller in Perth was awarded the contract to build the canal. The route would lead from Perth to the mouth of the Tay River. The locks were to be smaller than those on the Rideau, only 27 by 6.1 m (89 by 20 ft), and a depth in the channel of 1.1 m (3 ft 7 in). This was a less expensive option and it was felt that it would accommodate most of the commercial traffic of the day. By the end of 1834, five locks, six dams (with timber slides), two swing bridges and several embankments were built. This became known as the First Tay Canal.

The First Tay Canal was never a commercial success. Revenues were not sufficient to allow proper maintenance and the condition of the canal deteriorated over the years. In 1865, several of the locks were destroyed by logs and the canal was shut down.

=== Second Tay Canal ===
After the demise of the First Tay Canal, a political lobby started to build a new canal. The Government of Canada had taken over the Tay Navigation Company, and in 1881, they initiated an investigation into making the Tay navigable to Perth. Perth's local member of parliament, John G. Haggart, had some influence in launching this investigation which was carried out by the engineers of the Rideau Canal under the direction of Superintendent Wise. Two routes were examined, one following the route of the First Tay Canal to Port Elmsley and a second involving a canal cut from Beveridge Bay of Lower Rideau Lake to the Tay River.

To the disappointment of the residents of Port Elmsley, the second route was chosen. In 1883, a Government of Canada Order-in-Council authorized a contract with A.H. Manning & Macdonald Company for the construction of the Tay Canal. The proposal included deepening the entire system to the required 1.7 m (5 ft 7 in) depth; cutting a 18 m (59 ft) wide, 2 km (1.2 mi) long canal to Beveridge Bay; building two locks near the south end of the canal cut, each with a lift of 4.0 m (13.1 ft); and building a flat overflow dam across the former channel of the Tay near the entrance to the new canal cut.

The locks were built to the same design and specifications as the Rideau Canal locks. Started in early 1885, they were completed in 1887. Final excavation of the canal to the required navigation depth and an expansion of the basin in Perth were not completed until 1891.

For a time, the canal from the Beveridges Locks to Perth became known as "Haggart's Ditch".

== Tay Today ==
The Tay Canal is currently operated by Parks Canada as part of their Rideau Canal operations. In normal conditions, the canal can handle boats up to 27.4 metres (90 feet) in length, 7.9 metres (26 feet) in width, and 6.7 metres (22 feet) in height with a draft of up to 1.5 metres (4.9 feet) (boats drafting over 1.2 metres (3.9 feet) are asked to contact the Rideau Canal Office of Parks Canada prior to their trip). The locks are in operation from mid-May to mid-October.

The limiting factor for a trip all the way into Perth is the fixed height of the Craig Street bridge (2.1 metres (6.9 feet)). If a vessel is taller than this, the vessel will have to dock at Last Duel Park, a short walk from downtown Perth. If a vessel is less than 2.1 metres above the waterline but taller than 1.6 metres (5.2 feet), the vessel's operator will have to have the Beckwith Street Bridge swung open to get into the Perth basin. Vessel operators should mention this to the lock staff at Beveridges who can advise when the bridge will swing.
