= Lanark—Frontenac—Kingston (provincial electoral district) =

Provincial electoral district in Ontario, Canada

Coordinates: 44.901°N 76.684°W

Ontario electoral district
- Lanark—Frontenac—Kingston in relation to other electoral districts in Eastern Ontario

Provincial electoral district
- Legislature: Legislative Assembly of Ontario
MPP
John Jordan
Progressive Conservative
- District created: 2015
- First contested: 2018
- Last contested: 2025

Demographics
- Population (2016): 101,635
- Electors (2018): 81,925
- Area (km²): 7,063
- Pop. density (per km²): 14.4
- Census division(s): Frontenac, Lanark
- Census subdivision(s): Beckwith, Carleton Place, Drummond/North Elmsley, Kingston (part), Lanark Highlands, Mississippi Mills, Perth, Smiths Falls, South Frontenac, Tay Valley

Lanark—Frontenac—Kingston is a provincial electoral district in Ontario, Canada. It elects one member to the Legislative Assembly of Ontario. This riding was created in 2015.

== Members of Provincial Parliament ==
Lanark—Frontenac—Kingston
Assembly	Years	Member	Party
Riding created from Carleton—Mississippi Mills, Kingston and the Islands, and Lanark—Frontenac—Lennox and Addington
42nd	2018–2019	Randy Hillier	Progressive Conservative
42nd	2019–2022	Randy Hillier	Independent
43rd	2022–2025	John Jordan	Progressive Conservative
44th	2025–present	John Jordan	Progressive Conservative

== Election results ==
Winning party in each polling division of Lanark—Frontenac—Kingston at the 2025 Ontario general election

2025 Ontario general election
Party	Candidate	Votes	%	±%
Progressive Conservative	John Jordan	23,396	49.10	–1.02
Liberal	Rob Rainer	15,627	32.79	+17.04
New Democratic	John Macrae	5,030	10.56	–10.14
Green	Marlene Spruyt	1,595	3.35	–3.40
Ontario Party	Wendy Dillistone-Whitaker	982	2.06	–1.70
New Blue	David Motton	695	1.46	–0.25
Independent	Shane O'Neill	328	0.69	–
Total valid votes		47,653	99.50	
Total rejected, unmarked and declined ballots		240	0.50	–0.07
Turnout		47,893	51.33	+1.31
Eligible voters		93,300		
Progressive Conservative hold		Swing		–9.03
Source: Elections Ontario

Winning party in each polling division of Lanark—Frontenac—Kingston at the 2022 Ontario general election

2022 Ontario general election
Party	Candidate	Votes	%	±%	Expenditures
Progressive Conservative	John Jordan	22,142	50.11	–1.92	$51,659
New Democratic	Drew Cumpson	9,146	20.70	–9.77	$43,462
Liberal	Amanda Pulker-Mok	6,962	15.76	+5.11	$38,785
Green	Marlene Spruyt	2,982	6.75	+1.96	$17,655
Ontario Party	Thomas Mulder	1,663	3.76	–	$16,904
New Blue	Marcin Lewandowski	753	1.70	–	$4,962
Populist	Chelsea Hillier	324	0.73	–	$0
Independent	Craig Timothy Massey Rogers	213	0.48	–	$1,176
Total valid votes/expense limit		44,185	99.43	–	$124,365
Total rejected, unmarked and declined ballots		253	0.57	–0.36	
Turnout		44,438	50.02	–12.00	
Eligible voters		88,832			
Progressive Conservative gain from Independent		Swing		+3.93	
Source: Elections Ontario

2018 Ontario general election
Party	Candidate	Votes	%	±%
Progressive Conservative	Randy Hillier	26,194	52.03	+5.11
New Democratic	Ramsey Hart	15,339	30.47	+12.29
Liberal	Amanda Pulker-Mok	5,359	10.64	–17.33
Green	Anita Payne	2,410	4.79	–2.09
Libertarian	Steve Gebhardt	601	1.19	–
Independent	John A. McEwen	440	0.87	–
Total valid votes		50,343	99.07	
Total rejected, unmarked and declined ballots		473	0.93	
Turnout		50,816	62.03	
Eligible voters		81,925		
Progressive Conservative notional hold		Swing		+3.59
Source: Elections Ontario

2014 general election redistributed results
Party	Vote	%
Progressive Conservative	19,816	46.92
Liberal	11,815	27.98
New Democratic	7,678	18.18
Green	2,903	6.87
Freedom	18	0.04

== See also ==
- List of Ontario provincial electoral districts
- Canadian provincial electoral districts
