= Bobs Lake (South Frontenac) =

- Location of Bobs Lake in Ontario.
- Location: Ontario, Canada
- Coordinates: 44°40′52″N 76°35′16″W
- Type: Lake
- Part of: St. Lawrence River drainage basin
- Primary inflows: Eagle Creek (Ontario), Fish Creek (Ontario)
- Max. length: 16 km (9.9 mi)
- Max. width: 5 km (3.1 mi)
- Surface area: 32.22 km^{2} (12.44 sq mi)
- Surface elevation: 162 m (531 ft)

Bobs Lake is a lake in Frontenac County and Lanark County in Eastern Ontario, Canada. It is in the St. Lawrence River drainage basin and is the source of the Tay River.

== Hydrology ==
The vast majority of the lake is in geographic Bedford Township, part of the municipality of South Frontenac, with a small tip of Mill Bay at the north in geographic Oso Township, Central Frontenac; both municipalities are in Frontenac County. The northeastern end of the lake is in geographic South Sherbrooke Township, part of the municipality of Tay Valley in Lanark County.

The primary inflow, at the northeast. The primary outflow, at the community of Bolingbroke at the northeast and controlled by a dam, is the Tay River. The Tay River flows via the Rideau River and Ottawa River to the Saint Lawrence River.

The lake has an area of 7,962 acres (32 km^{2}).

== Tributaries ==
Counterclockwise from the river mouth

- Davern Creek
- Eagle Creek
- Fish Creek
