= John Jordan (Canadian politician) =

Canadian politician

John Jordan MPP
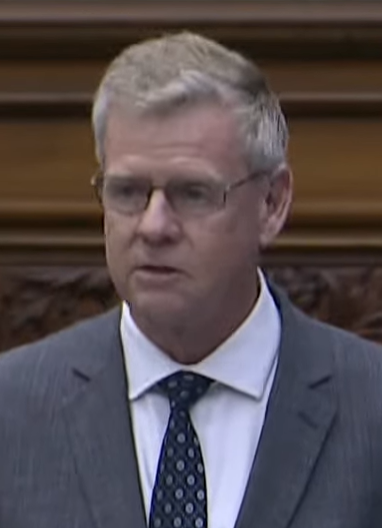
- Jordan in 2024

Member of the Ontario Provincial Parliament for Lanark—Frontenac—Kingston
- Incumbent
- Assumed office June 2, 2022
- Preceded by: Randy Hillier

Personal details
- Party: Progressive Conservative
- Spouse: Brenda
- Children: 3
- Parent: Leo Jordan
- Profession: retired CEO of Connectwell community health

John Jordan MPP is a Canadian politician who was elected to the Legislative Assembly of Ontario in the 2022 provincial election. He represents the riding of Lanark—Frontenac—Kingston as a member of the Progressive Conservative Party of Ontario.

Jordan is the son of former MPP Leo Jordan.

== Electoral history ==
2025 Ontario general election: Lanark—Frontenac—Kingston
Party	Candidate	Votes	%	±%
Progressive Conservative	John Jordan	23,396	49.10	–1.02
Liberal	Rob Rainer	15,627	32.79	+17.04
New Democratic	John Macrae	5,030	10.56	–10.14
Green	Marlene Spruyt	1,595	3.35	–3.40
Ontario Party	Wendy Dillistone-Whitaker	982	2.06	–1.70
New Blue	David Motton	695	1.46	–0.25
Independent	Shane O'Neill	328	0.69	–
Total valid votes		47,653	99.50	
Total rejected, unmarked and declined ballots		240	0.50	–0.07
Turnout		47,893	51.33	+1.31
Eligible voters		93,300		
Progressive Conservative hold		Swing		–9.03
Source: Elections Ontario

2022 Ontario general election: Lanark—Frontenac—Kingston
Party	Candidate	Votes	%	±%	Expenditures
Progressive Conservative	John Jordan	22,142	50.11	–1.92	$51,659
New Democratic	Drew Cumpson	9,146	20.70	–9.77	$43,462
Liberal	Amanda Pulker-Mok	6,962	15.76	+5.11	$38,785
Green	Marlene Spruyt	2,982	6.75	+1.96	$17,655
Ontario Party	Thomas Mulder	1,663	3.76	–	$16,904
New Blue	Marcin Lewandowski	753	1.70	–	$4,962
Populist	Chelsea Hillier	324	0.73	–	$0
Independent	Craig Timothy Massey Rogers	213	0.48	–	$1,176
Total valid votes/expense limit		44,185	99.43	–	$124,365
Total rejected, unmarked and declined ballots		253	0.57	–0.36	
Turnout		44,438	50.02	–12.00	
Eligible voters		88,832			
Progressive Conservative gain from Independent		Swing		▲3.93	
Source: Elections Ontario
