= Ontario Landowners Association =

Canadian property rights organization

The Ontario Landowners Association is an organization which seeks to protect property rights in Ontario, Canada. The OLA was formed "...to preserve and protect the rights of property owners." The organization seeks to cause laws and regulations, whether federal, provincial, or municipal, to be written so as to be more respectful of the rights of property owners. The Ontario Landowners Association also promotes the use of letters patent as a tool to aid in the protection of private property rights.

== History ==
The Ontario Landowners Association was founded in December 2005 by delegates from twelve pre-existing landowners groups representing different rural areas of the province. The groups had already been cooperating closely, and for the most part were modeled on the Lanark Landowners Association, which had been conducting demonstrations and other activities since early 2003. A parallel group, the Renfrew Landowners Association, had existed since 2000 and had started the slogan, "This Land is Our Land: Back off Government" that would be adopted by the Lanark Landowners and eventually by the OLA. But it was the Lanark group that first tried to move beyond purely local issues and to recreate itself in different parts of the province.

The Lanark Landowners had grown out of an effort to set up a group to advise Scott Reid, the MP for Lanark, on agricultural issues. An initial meeting in April 2003, with Reid present, was held at the kitchen table of Merle Bowes, a Carleton Place farmer. Randy Hillier, who would go on to serve as the first president of the Lanark Landowners, was also present at the meeting. Bowes later observed that no matter what farm-related issue was being discussed at the meeting, "All the problems pointed back to property rights and that got us going."

The Lanark Landowners' first action, in May 2003, was a demonstration to protest a property standards by-law in the town of Mississippi Mills. The next month, the group conducted an illegal out-of-season deer hunt to draw attention to the refusal of the Ontario Ministry of Natural Resources to permit farmers to cull deer who were eating their crops. Media were invited to the hunt and ministry officials were presented with a choice between three options: arresting the farmers, tolerating an ongoing violation of the law, or loosening the criteria for issuing out-of-season cull licences. Within weeks, the third option had been chosen, and the Landowners had won a high-profile victory.

This victory emboldened the group and Hillier rapidly built a high profile in the Ontario media, conducting increasingly large demonstrations in rural Ontario. The highest-profile demonstrations took place on Parliament Hill in Ottawa in April 2004, and in March 2005 in Toronto on front lawn of the Ontario Legislature. Future Prime Minister Stephen Harper attended the Ottawa rally and addressed the crowd, endorsing property rights.

Local groups modeled on the Lanark model grew up across Ontario over the next three years. By the time of the first convention of the Ontario Landowners Association in Belleville in February 2006, the combined membership of all the local groups was claimed by The Landowner (a magazine started by the Landowners in early 2006) to be over 8,000. Hillier was elected as the organization's first president.

During its first years, the OLA sometimes engaged in acts that were seen by some to be in poor taste. For example, the group sent to Queen's Park a photograph of a bullet-riddled dead deer which had been tagged "Leona"—a reference to Leona Dombrowsky, who at the time was agriculture minister in Premier Dalton McGuinty's cabinet.

After the creation of the OLA in 2006, acts of civil disobedience mostly ended, and were replaced by attempts to influence the political system by more traditional means. Landowner-endorsed candidates ran for municipal office in many rural municipalities in the 2006 Ontario municipal elections. Hillier and other members of the OLA began to appear as witnesses before parliamentary hearings into issues affecting rural areas.

In January 2007, Hillier resigned as president of the OLA to seek the Progressive Conservative nomination in Lanark—Frontenac—Lennox and Addington the upcoming provincial election. Some members of the party suggested that Hillier's activist past made him an unsuitable candidate, and the Toronto Star speculated that the party might disqualify him, but in the end Hillier won the nomination and was elected to the legislature, where he currently serves. The presidency was taken over by Jack MacLaren, a farmer from rural Ottawa who had previously been a leader of the de-amalgamation movement calling for the re-establishment of the old Carleton County out of the four rural townships that had been amalgamated into the City of Ottawa in 2001.

By the summer of 2008, the OLA had expanded to 20 chapters, including one in Toronto, and had become a large enough movement to attract the attention of the Governor General's Leadership Group, which arranged a meeting with the OLA in June.

At the provincial level, it has been noted that Hillier had City Ottawa off on our own Ontarian Alternative supported the Reform Party of Ontario prior to the party's merger with the Family Coalition Party of Ontario to create the New Reform Party of Ontario., "Harness had worked out a side deal under which he would become the deputy under Hillier, if Hillier joined Reform Ontario.[14] Hillier declined and then quickly denied any involvement with the side deal, and the strength of both organizations was greatly diminished."

Following the election of Patrick Brown (politician) to the leadership of the Progressive Conservative Party of Ontario, the OLA began supporting the provincial PC party.

In 2012, Hillier left the Association over a dispute about land patents. Hillier continues to sit as an MPP for Lanark—Frontenac—Lennox and Addington.
