= Reopening Ontario Act =

Law of Ontario, Canada

Reopening Ontario (A Flexible Response to COVID-19) Act, 2020

Legislative Assembly of Ontario
- Long title: An Act to enact the Reopening Ontario (A Flexible Response to COVID-19) Act, 2020
- Citation: S.O. 2020, c. 17
- Passed: July 21, 2020
- Royal assent: July 21, 2020
- Effective: July 21, 2020

Legislative history
- Bill citation: Jones, Sylvia. Bill 195, Reopening Ontario (A Flexible Response to COVID-19) Act, 2020. Office of the Assembly.
- Introduced by: Sylvia Jones MPP, Solicitor General
- First reading: July 7, 2020
- Second reading: July 14, 2020-July 21, 2020
- Third reading: July 21, 2020
- Status: In force

The Reopening Ontario (A Flexible Response to COVID-19) Act, 2020 (French: Loi de 2020 sur la réouverture de l'Ontario (mesures adaptables en réponse à la COVID-19) (commonly referred to as the Reopening Ontario Act) is an Act of the Legislative Assembly of Ontario that grants the Lieutenant Governor in Council the ability to continue "orders made under sections 7.0.2 and 7.1 of the Emergency Management and Civil Protection Act in relation to (the) COVID-19 (pandemic)".

== History ==
On the day the Bill came for third reading in the Legislature, Belinda Karahalios was removed from the Progressive Conservative caucus by Premier Doug Ford because she voted against it.

The Ontario Nurses Association characterized the day as dark, and ONA President Vicki McKenna said that it "provides extensive powers to override collective agreements and take away the rights of our nurses and health-care professionals who have been working so hard to provide care during the pandemic... this bill enables... employers to deny or cancel vacation time, redeploy them to another unit or... facility at any time, and have far too much authority that is unchecked by the collective agreement."
