= Drummond/North Elmsley =

- Township (lower-tier)
- Township of Drummond/North Elmsley
- St. Augustine's Anglican Church in Richardson

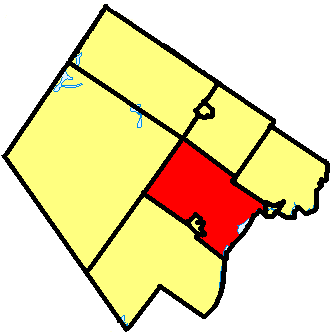
- Drummond/North Elmsley within Lanark County

- Location within Southern Ontario
- Coordinates: 44°58′N 76°12′W
- Country: Canada
- Province: Ontario
- County: Lanark
- Incorporated: January 1, 1998

Government
  - Type: Township
  - Reeve: Stephen M. Fournier
  - Governing Body: Drummond/North Elmsley Township Council
  - MP: Scott Reid (CPC)
  - MPP: John Jordan (OPC)

Area
  - Land: 365.67 km^{2} (141.19 sq mi)

Population (2021)
  - Total: 8,183
  - Density: 22.4/km^{2} (58/sq mi)
- Time zone: UTC-5 (EST)
  - Summer (DST): UTC-4 (EDT)
- Postal code FSA: K7H
- Area codes: 613, 343
- Website: www.dnetownship.ca

Drummond/North Elmsley is a township in eastern Ontario, Canada, in Lanark County. It is situated on the north shore of the Rideau River between the town of Perth and the town of Smiths Falls. It is a predominantly rural municipality. The township offices are located in the hamlet of Port Elmsley.

== History ==
The township was formed on January 1, 1998, through the merger of Drummond Township and North Elmsley Township.

== Geography ==
=== Communities ===
The township comprises the communities of Armstrong Corners, Balderson, Beveridge Locks, Cook's Shore, Craig Shore, Drummond Centre, Ebbs Shore, Elmgrove, Ferguson Falls, Glenview, Innisville, McCreary's Shore, McCulloughs Landing, McNaughton Shore, Port Elmsley, Prestonvale, Richardson, Rideau Ferry, Robertson's Shore and Wayside.

=== Ecology ===
The most common landscape is gently rolling Canadian Shield, predominantly gneiss. The valleys often have clay or sand deposits from events near the end of the last ice age. At one point near the end of the last ice age, the Champlain Sea flooded the Ottawa valley as far inland as what is now the town of Perth. West of Perth along Highway 7 one can see a remnant of this clay plain. An old shoreline of the Champlain Sea crosses Highway 7 near Ramsay Concession 2 before winding south into Drummond/North Elmsley. North of Perth, this clay plain is occupied by the huge Blueberry Marsh.

The hard rock and thin soil produced distinctive deciduous forests dominated by maple, oak, beech, ash and pine. Southern trees like hickory and butternut are less common. Wetter areas have elm, silver maple and white cedar. Hemlock was much more common in the past, but logging for bark used in tanning has much depleted this species. Only a few large hemlock stands remain, although there are many scattered trees through the remaining forests. Natural forest fires from lightning created some fire barrens in the southern parts of the township. Generally speaking, settlers cleared the deeper pockets of soil, and the clay plains. This produced the distinctive landscape with fields surrounded by forested uplands. The stone piles along the edge of the field illustrate the labour involved in creating agricultural land here. The many outcrops of Canadian shield in fields are also a reminder of just how close to the surface bed rock remains.

The Mississippi River and the Rideau River have extensive areas of wetland. The less flooded areas tend to have silver maple swamp, while lower on the shoreline are marshes and aquatic plants. One of the largest wetlands is the Innisville wetland, a provincially significant wetland that formed upstream from Mississippi Lake. Other wetlands include the Tay Marsh (south of Perth) and The Swale (near Smiths Falls). Both rivers are popular with canoeists and naturalists. Smaller wetlands occur throughout the county; many are produced by beavers. Beaver ponds are an important as they provide habitat for a great many kinds of species, including frogs, turtles, otters, muskrats and migratory waterfowl. Beaver ponds provide a cycle of flooding, from shallow water through to wet meadow, and most phases of pond ecology can be seen driving the township roads.

Owing to its location—the combination of two large rivers, wetlands and forests—the county has a rich array of wildlife, and wildlife viewing is a popular activity. Significant animal species include the black rat snake (now officially renamed the Gray ratsnake by experts on this species) and the Blanding's turtle.

=== Climate ===
Climate data for Drummond Centre (1991−2020 normals, extremes 1984–2020)
Month	Jan	Feb	Mar	Apr	May	Jun	Jul	Aug	Sep	Oct	Nov	Dec	Year
Record high °C (°F)	13.0 (55.4)	14.0 (57.2)	27.0 (80.6)	32.5 (90.5)	35.0 (95.0)	35.0 (95.0)	36.5 (97.7)	37.5 (99.5)	35.0 (95.0)	27.5 (81.5)	21.5 (70.7)	17.0 (62.6)	37.5 (99.5)
Mean daily maximum °C (°F)	−4.6 (23.7)	−2.3 (27.9)	3.7 (38.7)	11.6 (52.9)	19.8 (67.6)	24.4 (75.9)	27.1 (80.8)	25.8 (78.4)	21.2 (70.2)	13.3 (55.9)	5.9 (42.6)	−1.2 (29.8)	12.1 (53.8)
Daily mean °C (°F)	−9.5 (14.9)	−8 (18)	−1.9 (28.6)	5.9 (42.6)	13.2 (55.8)	18.1 (64.6)	20.7 (69.3)	19.5 (67.1)	15.2 (59.4)	8.4 (47.1)	1.8 (35.2)	−5.1 (22.8)	6.5 (43.7)
Mean daily minimum °C (°F)	−14.2 (6.4)	−13.5 (7.7)	−7.3 (18.9)	0.1 (32.2)	6.8 (44.2)	11.9 (53.4)	14.3 (57.7)	13.2 (55.8)	9.1 (48.4)	3.5 (38.3)	−2.4 (27.7)	−9 (16)	1.0 (33.8)
Record low °C (°F)	−36 (−33)	−35.5 (−31.9)	−33 (−27)	−13.5 (7.7)	−10.5 (13.1)	−1.5 (29.3)	3.0 (37.4)	−0.5 (31.1)	−5 (23)	−9 (16)	−24.5 (−12.1)	−32.5 (−26.5)	−36 (−33)
Average precipitation mm (inches)	73.7 (2.90)	56.9 (2.24)	62.4 (2.46)	77.9 (3.07)	74.1 (2.92)	89.4 (3.52)	89.3 (3.52)	88.1 (3.47)	91.1 (3.59)	86.8 (3.42)	75.4 (2.97)	73.8 (2.91)	938.9 (36.96)
Average rainfall mm (inches)	27.3 (1.07)	17.4 (0.69)	35.0 (1.38)	66.8 (2.63)	73.9 (2.91)	89.4 (3.52)	89.3 (3.52)	88.1 (3.47)	91.1 (3.59)	84.4 (3.32)	58.8 (2.31)	30.7 (1.21)	752.3 (29.62)
Average snowfall cm (inches)	46.4 (18.3)	39.5 (15.6)	27.4 (10.8)	11.1 (4.4)	0.2 (0.1)	0.0 (0.0)	0.0 (0.0)	0.0 (0.0)	0.0 (0.0)	2.4 (0.9)	16.6 (6.5)	43.1 (17.0)	186.6 (73.5)
Average precipitation days (≥ 0.2 mm)	15.2	12.4	12.0	12.8	13.4	13.0	12.5	11.5	12.4	14.2	13.5	15.4	158.4
Average rainy days (≥ 0.2 mm)	3.8	3.2	6.3	11.5	13.4	13.0	12.5	11.5	12.4	13.8	10.1	5.2	116.6
Average snowy days (≥ 0.2 cm)	13.2	10.4	6.9	2.9	0.19	0.0	0.0	0.0	0.04	0.59	4.5	11.3	49.9
Source: Environment Canada

== Demographics ==
In the 2021 Census of Population conducted by Statistics Canada, Drummond/North Elmsley had a population of 8,183 living in 3,287 of its 3,708 total private dwellings, a change of 5.3% from its 2016 population of 7,773. With a land area of 365.67 km^{2} (141.19 sq mi), it had a population density of 22.4/km^{2} (58.0/sq mi) in 2021.

Canada census – Drummond/North Elmsley community profile

	2021	2016	2011
Population	8,183 (+5.3% from 2016)	7,773 (+3.8% from 2011)	7,487 (+5.2% from 2006)
Land area	365.67 km^{2} (141.19 sq mi)	366.13 km^{2} (141.36 sq mi)	366.03 km^{2} (141.32 sq mi)
Population density	22.4/km^{2} (58/sq mi)	21.2/km^{2} (55/sq mi)	20.5/km^{2} (53/sq mi)
Median age	50.8 (M: 50.4, F: 50.8)	49.6 (M: 49.4, F: 49.9)
Private dwellings	3,708 (total) 3,287 (occupied)	3,607 (total)	3,478 (total)
Median household income	$98,000	$81,303

References: 2021 2016 2011

Historical census populations – Drummond/North Elmsley
Year	Pop.	±%
2001	6,670	—
2006	7,118	+6.7%
2011	7,487	+5.2%
2016	7,773	+3.8%
2021	8,183	+5.3%
Source: Statistics Canada

Historical census populations – Drummond Township

Year	Pop.	±%
1871	2,467	—
1881	2,378	−3.6%
1891	2,202	−7.4%
1901	2,078	−5.6%
1911	1,764	−15.1%
1921	1,584	−10.2%

Year	Pop.	±%
1931	1,426	−10.0%
1941	1,423	−0.2%
1951	1,448	+1.8%
1956	1,432	−1.1%
1961	1,428	−0.3%
1966	1,500	+5.0%

Year	Pop.	±%
1971	1,639	+9.3%
1976	1,949	+18.9%
1981	2,144	+10.0%
1986	2,345	+9.4%
1991	2,771	+18.2%
1996	3,185	+14.9%

Source: Statistics Canada

Historical census populations – North Elmsley Township

Year	Pop.	±%
1871	1,418	—
1881	1,319	−7.0%
1891	1,233	−6.5%
1901	1,087	−11.8%
1911	1,066	−1.9%
1921	779	−26.9%

Year	Pop.	±%
1931	788	+1.2%
1941	725	−8.0%
1951	825	+13.8%
1956	933	+13.1%
1961	1,048	+12.3%
1966	1,225	+16.9%

Year	Pop.	±%
1971	1,568	+28.0%
1976	1,954	+24.6%
1981	2,118	+8.4%
1986	2,360	+11.4%
1991	2,833	+20.0%
1996	3,018	+6.5%

Source: Statistics Canada

== Places of interest ==
- Port Elmsley Drive-In theatre

== Transportation ==
The north-south Ontario Highway 7 passes through the township from Perth towards Carleton Place. The east-west County Road 43 goes between Perth and Smiths Falls.

The Rideau Trail passes through the township twice, between Smiths Falls and Perth and to the south of Perth.

== See also ==
- List of townships in Ontario
