= Perth, Ontario =

Town in Eastern Ontario, Canada

Perth
- Town (lower-tier)
- Town of Perth
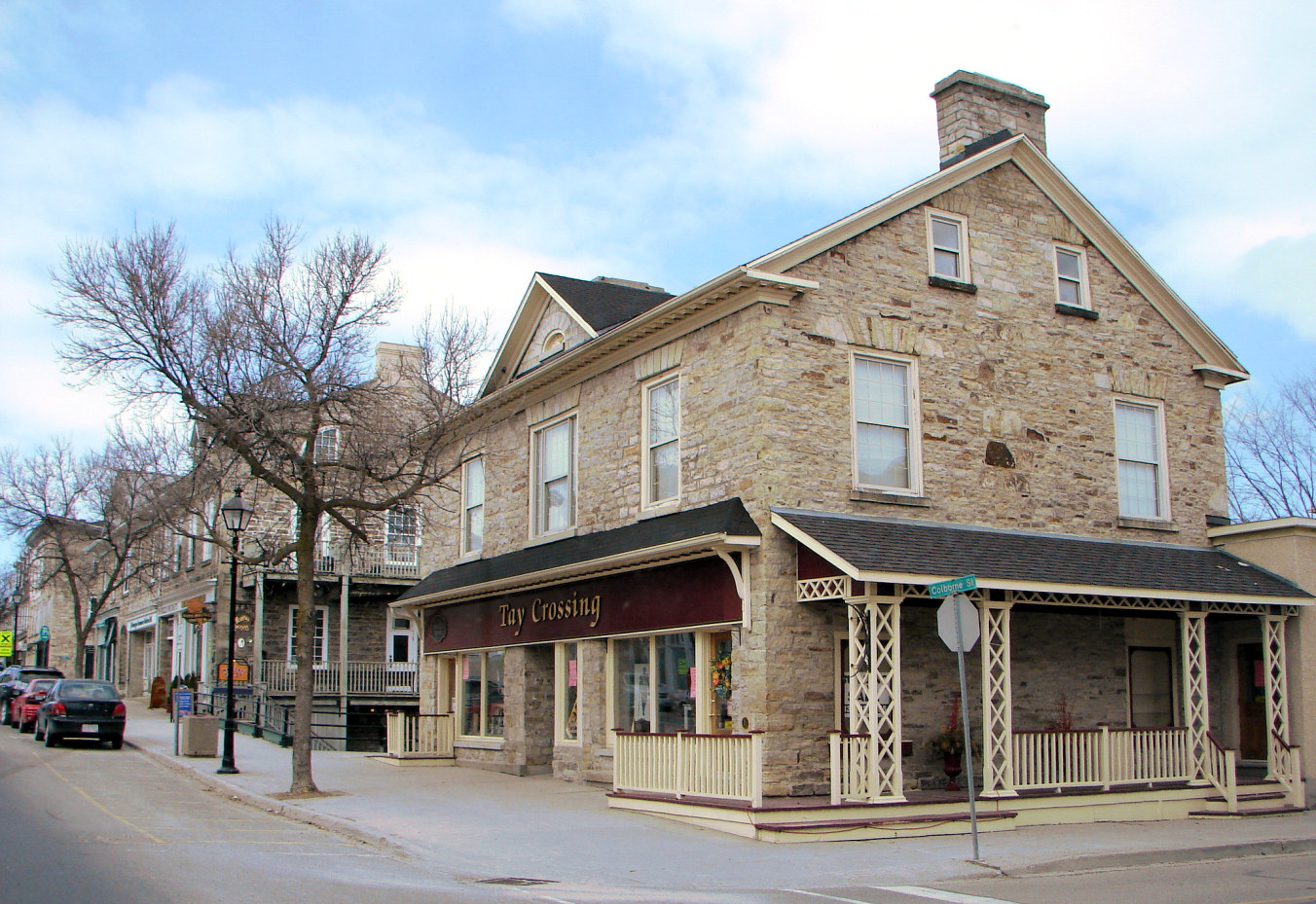

- Coat of arms
- Motto: Pro Rege, Lege et Grege
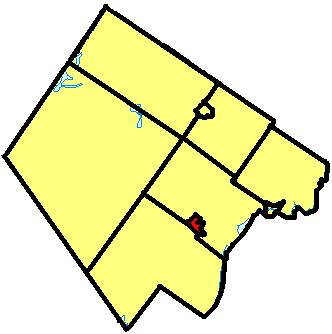

- Perth in southern Ontario
- Coordinates: 44°54′N 76°15′W
- Country: Canada
- Province: Ontario
- County: Lanark
- Settled: 1816
- Incorporated: 1853

Government
  - Type: Town
  - Mayor: Judy Brown
  - Fed. riding: Lanark—Frontenac
  - Prov. riding: Lanark—Frontenac—Kingston

Area
  - Land: 12.21 km^{2} (4.71 sq mi)

Population (2021)
  - Total: 6,469
  - Density: 529.8/km^{2} (1,372/sq mi)
- Time zone: UTC−5 (EST)
  - Summer (DST): UTC−4 (EDT)
- Postal code: K7H
- Area code: 613
- Website: www.perth.ca

Perth is a town in Eastern Ontario, Canada. It is located on the Tay River, 83 kilometres (52 mi) southwest of Ottawa, and is the seat of Lanark County.

== History ==
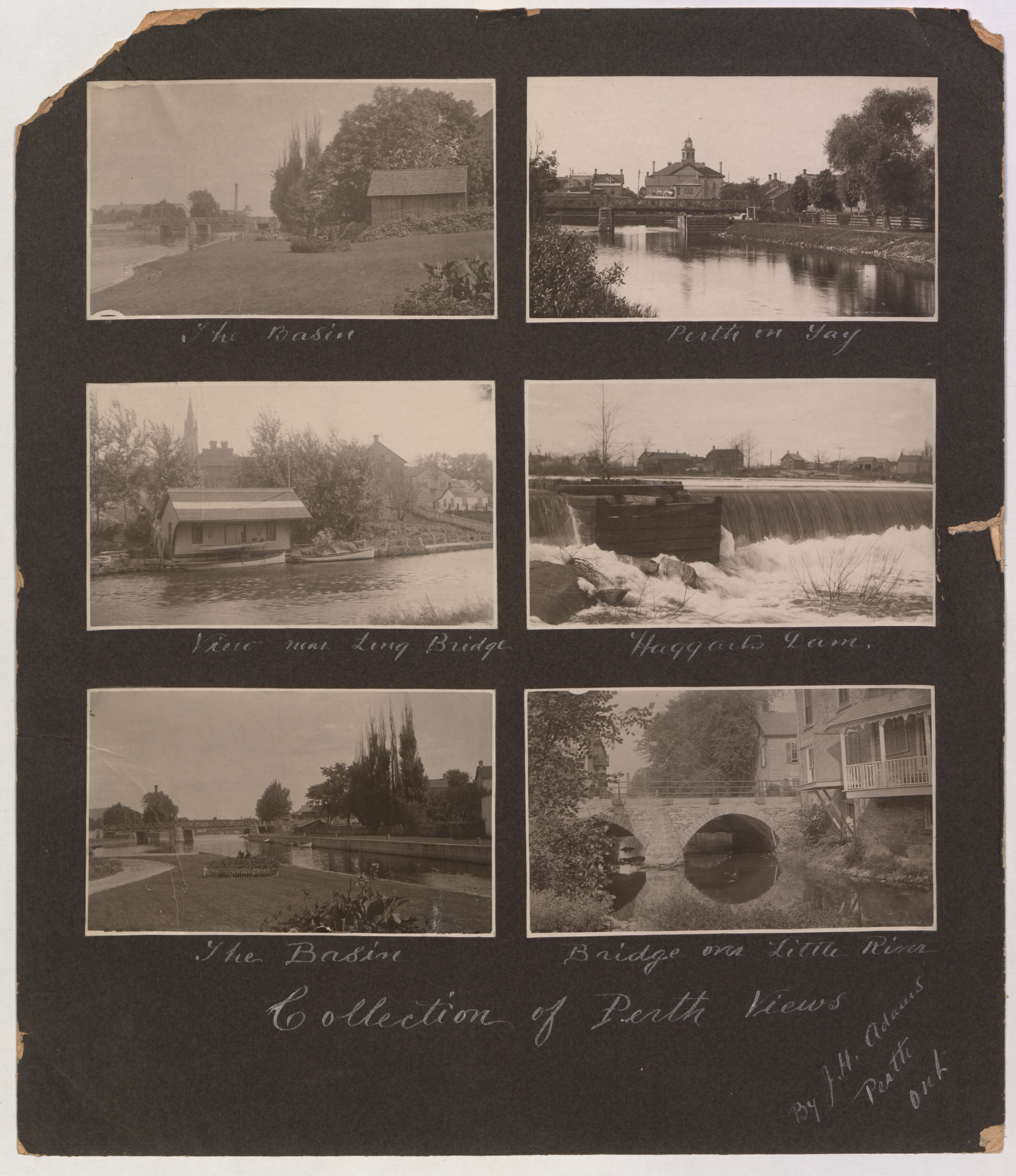
Perth in 1908

The town was established as a military settlement in 1816, shortly after the War of 1812. The settlement of Lanark County began in 1815. In that year "the Settlement forming on the Rideau River" as it was officially referred to (and which soon became known as "Perth Military Settlement") began to function under Military direction. The settlement was named Perth in honour of acting Governor-General Sir Gordon Drummond, whose ancestral home was Perthshire.

Several townships were surveyed to facilitate the location of farms for military and other settlers; and the site of the future Town of Perth, which had been chosen as the headquarters of the Military Establishment was surveyed in 1816.

Many of the first settlers were military veterans on half pay, while others were military veterans from France, Germany, Poland, Italy, Scotland or Ireland who were offered land in return for their service. The Reverend William Bell, who arrived in June 1817, noted in his diaries that the settlement was more European than the Scottish settlement described to him. The first Scottish settlers came in 1816. Many of the Scottish immigrants were stonemasons; their work can be seen in many area buildings and in the locks of the Rideau Canal.

The military regime lasted until 1824, when settlers were granted municipal rights, i.e., 'the right of self-government'. For many years Perth was the military, judicial, political and social capital, not only of the County of Lanark, but of the whole of the Ottawa Valley, north and west, until owing to the construction of the Rideau Canal, and the development of the lumber industry further north and west along the Ottawa, it finally was eclipsed by the town called "Bytown"—the present City of Ottawa, the Capital of the Dominion. But for many years the people of the town of Bytown, while it was still 'Bytown' had to come to Perth for their law and justice, for the law courts of the whole great district were located there.

The first secretary/stores-keeper (and eventually postmaster and superintendent) of the settlement was Daniel Daverne, brought up from the Quarter Masters General Department in Kingston, Ontario, to assume these positions.

Perth is home to a pioneer burial ground, St. Paul's United Church Cemetery, formerly The Old Methodist Burying Ground. This cemetery is at the south-east end of the Last Duel Park on Robinson Street. The Craig Street Cemetery, sometimes referred to as the "Old Burying Grounds" also contains many historic graves and saw use from 1820 to 1873.

The town's motto is "Pro Rege, Lege et Grege" ("For the King, the Law and the People"), which is shared with the City of Perth in Scotland, and which was adopted in 1980 along with a new crest. The previous motto, "Festina lente sed certo" ("Make haste slowly but surely"), and original town crest appears on the uniforms of the Perth Citizen's Band. Founded in 1850, this band continues a tradition of community music with numerous concerts each season.

Near the town is the home of world show jumping champion Ian Millar and Millar Brooke Farm where his great horse Big Ben (1976–1999) is buried. The town has erected a bronze life-sized statue of the horse and Ian Millar, in Stewart Park, across from the Code's Mill building.

This town was the site of the last fatal duel in Upper Canada. Robert Lyon, a law student, was killed on June 13, 1833, after fighting over a woman (Elizabeth Hughes) with a former friend, John Wilson. A local park is named "Last Duel Park" to commemorate the event.

In 1893, a 22,000-pound (10,000 kg) cheese known as the 'Mammoth Cheese' was produced in Perth to be exhibited in Chicago at the World's Columbian Exposition to promote Canadian cheese around the world.

The Links O'Tay Golf course, walking distance from the downtown core, began its trek through golfing history in 1890 and was Canada's oldest continuously operating golf course until it was bought by Caivan, a suburban subdivision housing developer, in 2021. Caivan proposes to build 1,069 housing units on the golf course land and the company took its use to the Ontario Land Tribunal in 2023. There is widespread concern among Perth citizens, and with some town Councillors, about the impact of the development on the small town. On February 11, 2025, the town entered mediation with Caivan over its plans. The Perth Citizens Band, still giving concerts on the bandstand behind Town Hall, is a tradition dating back over 150 years. The band is Canada's oldest active town band. The Perth Citizens Band played "The Maple Leaf Forever" as the Mammoth Cheese departed to the Chicago World's Fair in 1893. The bandstand has been behind the Town Hall since it was moved there in 1901 and free summer concerts have taken place there ever since.

Perth is also the site of the first installation of a telephone other than Bell's experimental installations. A town dentist, Dr. J. F. Kennedy, a friend of Alexander Graham Bell, installed a direct telephone connection between his home and office. By 1887, there were 19 telephones in Perth, with a switchboard in Dr. Kennedy's office.

In 2010, Perth held the historic "Kilt Run" in which 1,067 kilt-clad runners crossed the finish line. The idea to hold a kilt run in Perth was conceived of in October 2009 by Terry Stewart after the Mayor submitted a letter to the Perth Courier requesting town residents come up with an idea to help Perth, Scotland celebrate its 800th anniversary. The Perth, Ontario, Kilt Run has since become an annual event. The 2016 Kilt Run attracted 5,000 runners as part of the town's 200th anniversary.

== Demographics ==
In the 2021 Census of Population conducted by Statistics Canada, Perth had a population of 6,469 living in 3,271 of its 3,395 total private dwellings, a change of 9.1% from its 2016 population of 5,930. With a land area of 12.21 km^{2} (4.71 sq mi), it had a population density of 529.8/km^{2} (1,372.2/sq mi) in 2021.

The 2016 census revealed that Perth has the highest ratio of men to women in Canada: 80 men to 100 women.

Canada census – Perth community profile

	2021	2016	2011
Population	6,469 (+9.1% from 2016)	5,930 (+1.5% from 2011)	5,840 (-1.1% from 2006)
Land area	12.21 km^{2} (4.71 sq mi)	12.25 km^{2} (4.73 sq mi)	12.25 km^{2} (4.73 sq mi)
Population density	529.8/km^{2} (1,372/sq mi)	484.1/km^{2} (1,254/sq mi)	476.7/km^{2} (1,235/sq mi)
Median age	58.4 (M: 55.2, F: 60.8)	55.1 (M: 52.3, F: 57.1)
Private dwellings	3,395 (total) 3,271 (occupied)	3,169 (total) 3,010 (occupied)	3,131 (total)
Median household income	$63,200	$52,429

References: 2021 2016 2011

Historical census populations – Perth, Ontario

Year	Pop.	±%
1921	3,790	—
1931	4,099	+8.2%
1941	4,458	+8.8%
1951	5,034	+12.9%
1956	5,145	+2.2%
1961	5,360	+4.2%

Year	Pop.	±%
1966	5,559	+3.7%
1971	5,537	−0.4%
1976	5,687	+2.7%
1981	5,655	−0.6%
1986	5,673	+0.3%
1991	5,574	−1.7%

Year	Pop.	±%
1996	5,886	+5.6%
2001	6,003	+2.0%
2006	5,907	−1.6%
2011	5,840	−1.1%
2016	5,930	+1.5%
2021	6,469	+9.1%

Population counts are not adjusted for boundary changes.
Source: Statistics Canada

Mother tongue (2021):

- English as first language: 93.5%
- French as first language: 2.4%
- English and French as first language: 0.6%
- Other as first language: 3.3%

== Government ==
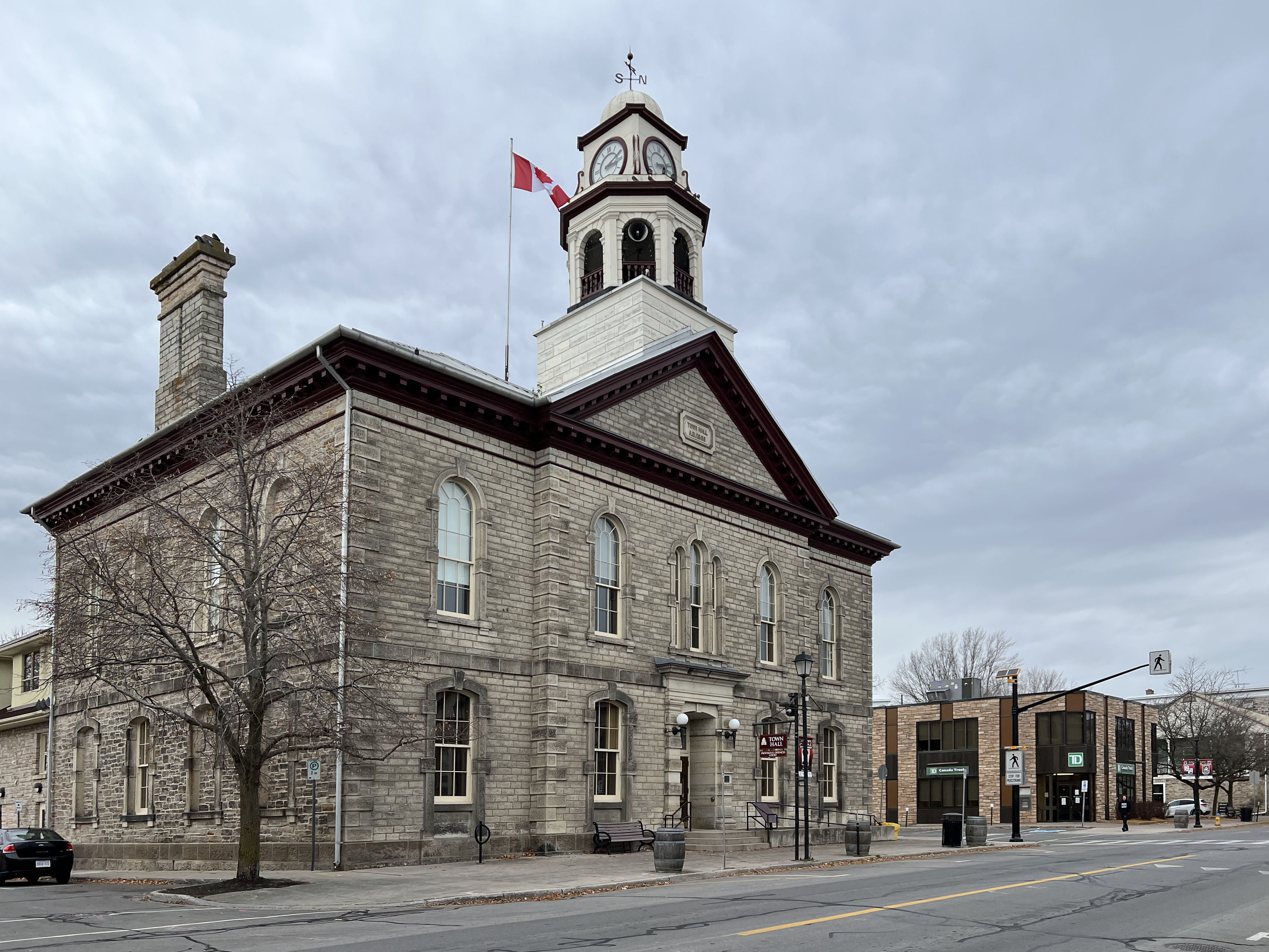
Perth Town Hall, built in 1863

List of former mayors:

- James S. Nichol (1854–1855, 1858)
- John Deacon (1856, 1859–1860)
- Robert Douglas (1857)
- John Haggart (1861–1864, 1871–1872)
- Richard Shaw (1865–1869)
- Henry D. Shaw (1870)
- James Morton Millar (1873–1874)
- William Horatio Radenhurst (1874–1878)
- Edward Elliott (1879–1880)
- Francis Alexander Hall (1881–1882)
- Arthur James Matheson (1883–1884)
- William Meighen (1885–1886)
- William James Pink (1887–1888)
- Thomas Alfred Code (1889–1890)
- William Butler (1891–1892)
- Duncan Kippen (1893–1894)
- Joseph MacKenzie Rogers (1895–1896)
- James A. Allan (1897–1898)
- Alexander Campbell Shaw (1899)
- John Alexander Stewart (1900–1901)
- James M. Balderson (1902)
- John Alexander Stewart (1903–1904)
- Charles James Foy (1905–1906)
- Henry Montague Shaw (1907–1908)
- Francis W. Hall (1909–1912)
- Allan Grant (1913–1915)
- James J. Hands (1916–1918)
- John T. Conway (1919–1922)
- Wellington Douglas (1923–1924)
- John Eduard de Hertel (1925–1926)
- T. Arthur Rogers (1927–1929)
- Joseph H. Devlin (1930–1932)
- James J. Hands (1932–1936)
- Charles Frederick Stone (1937)
- George C. Townshead (1938–1940)
- Walter C. McLaren (1941–1944)
- Frederick W. Burchell (1945–1946)
- Robert Kellock Gemmell (1947)
- John Pennett (1948–1950)
- Harold E. Burns (1951–1952)
- John Pennett (1953–1954)
- Ernest Scott Burchell (1955–1969)
- William A. Warren (1970–1972)
- Glenn H. Crain (1973–1974)
- Carl Greer (1976)
- William Warren (1977–1985)
- Lowell C. Yorke (1986–1989)
- Charles Montgomery (1989–1994)
- Lana March (1995–2003)
- Dennis Cordick (2004–2006)
- John Fenik (2006–2022)
- Judy Brown (2023–present)

== Attractions ==
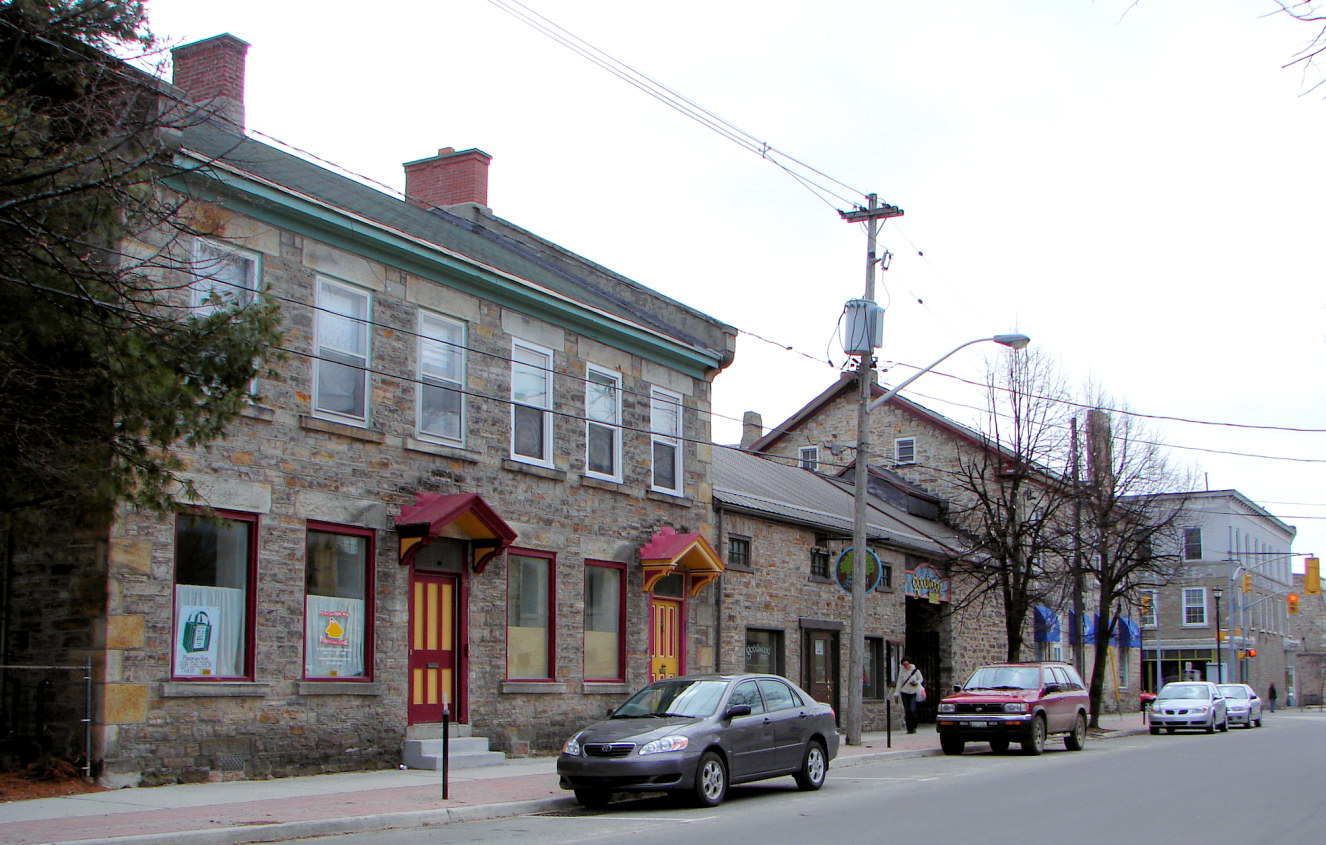
Historic downtown Perth

The Tay River splits into two main channels for much of its course through Perth. Much of downtown Perth, including the town hall, is on the island formed by the two channels. During the summer and fall of 2015, the fork in the river was modified to reduce erosion and flooding downstream.

The heritage downtown core of today's Perth consists of boutiques, specialty shops, cafés and restaurants, including crafts, antiques and flea markets, and summer Farmers' and Craft Markets. Most of these operate out of the century-old stone buildings in town. Code's Mill began as a tannery in the 1840s and then produced socks and felts until the mid-1900s. It was renovated in 1998 and now features a restaurant, boutique shops and wedding hall. The Perth Museum, situated downtown at the Matheson House, is a historic house constructed in 1840 and is designated as a National Historic Site of Canada.

Erected in 1863, the Perth Town Hall stands out as one of the most impressive municipal buildings in Eastern Ontario. The two-storey structure with cupola-shaped clock tower is constructed from white or cream-coloured freestone (Potsdam sandstone). Throughout the years, the building has housed an auditorium, council chambers, post office, police headquarters, lock-up and municipal offices. Perth's downtown area lies within a designated Heritage Conservation District.

Stewart Park, located behind Town Hall, features gardens, bridges, walking paths and treed picnic areas along the Tay River.

An interesting feature of the downtown core is the Crystal Palace, constructed from the discarded remnants of the glass street bus enclosures that used to be on Rideau Street in nearby Ottawa. This structure is located beside the Tay River and can be accessed by both Gore and Drummond Streets. It houses the Perth Farmers' and Craft Markets on summer Saturdays and is filled with Christmas trees decorated by community groups and schools in November and December. It also houses live music and children's activities during the popular Festival of the Maples held in April each year.

== Festivals and events ==
Each summer in July, the Stewart Park Music Festival takes place in Stewart Park. It is a popular free festival featuring live music as well as artisan and food vendors.

The Perth Lions Garlic Festival has been celebrating garlic grown in the area each August since 1997. Another festival growing in popularity is the Perth Ribfest Music Festival, which includes kids activities and takes place at Last Duel Park. The Perth Fair, a regional agricultural fair, takes place over the Labour Day weekend; it has been running annually since 1845, one of the oldest in Ontario.

The Festival of Maples is held annually every spring since 1974 and marks the end of the maple syrup harvest, of which Lanark County is known for producing and is dubbed the 'Maple Syrup Capital of Ontario'. The downtown festival features numerous shops and vendors, maple syrup producers and displays, children's entertainment, antique car show and a pancake breakfast. In 2019, the festival was held on April 27.

The Perth Kilt Run normally takes place at the end of June but the 10th anniversary of the Kilt Run was held on August 17, 2019. It holds the Guinness World Record for the world's largest kilted run.

The Perth Polar Bear Plunge, held annually on New Years Day since 1994, raises funds for local charities and is known as one of the safest and most successful Polar Bear Plunges in Canada.

== Sports and recreation ==
Hockey is very popular in Perth as it has been home to senior and junior teams. Currently, Perth is represented by the Blue Wings in the Eastern Ontario Junior "B" Hockey League. Minor hockey combines Perth and Lanark children with practices and games shared between the Perth and Lanark arenas. Perth was home to a professional baseball team for two years (1936–37) as part of the Canadian–American League. The Perth & District Indoor Pool is home to the Perth Stingrays Aquatic Club, which offers a masters program as well. The Perth United Soccer Club also provides recreational and competitive soccer programs for all ages.

Both high schools in Perth also offer a variety of other sports, such as basketball, football, volleyball, hockey, cross country running, badminton, soccer, curling, golf and track and field.

Conlon Farm Recreation Complex is a 54-acre recreation hub comprising several soccer fields and baseball diamonds and as well tennis courts, basketball courts, beach volleyball courts, skateboard park, pump track, play structures and a splash pad.

The Rideau Trail passes through Perth, which is the base for the Central Section of the Rideau Trail.

The 10-kilometre historic Tay Canal runs from downtown Perth through the Tay Marsh and connects to the Rideau Canal at Beveridge Locks.

== Schools ==
- The Queen Elizabeth School (elementary)
- The Stewart School (elementary)
- Perth & District Collegiate Institute
- St. John Catholic Elementary
- St. John Catholic High School
- Perth Children's House Montessori School

French Immersion is offered at the elementary and high schools listed above.

== Notable people ==
- Mike Brown, Olympian, Swimming
- Jared Coreau, NHL player, winner of the 2017 Calder Cup
- Les Douglas, NHL player and winner of the Stanley Cup with the Detroit Red Wings
- Alexander Fraser, Scottish soldier and hero of the Battle of Stoney Creek, War of 1812
- Sultana Frizell, Olympian, hammer throw
- Clayton "Cib" James, musician, comedian, and YouTuber
- Taes Leavitt, one half of Juno winning children's group Splash'N Boots
- Crispin Lipscomb, Olympian, snowboarding
- Carl Liscombe, Stanley Cup-winning NHL player
- Ian Millar, prolific show-jumper, equestrian world champion, and Olympic silver-medalist
- Alexander Morris, Canadian politician and second Lieutenant-Governor of Manitoba and the North-West Territories (1872–1878)
- Edmund Montague Morris, artist and author
- William Richard Motherwell, former Saskatchewan Minister of Agriculture and Federal Minister of Agriculture
- Herbert Taylor Reade, an assistant surgeon with the 61st Regiment, he was awarded the Victoria Cross for his gallantry in the siege of Delhi in 1857.
- John K. Robertson, physicist and pioneer in the field of medical physics
- John Robson, premier of British Columbia
- Billy Smith, Hall of Fame NHL goaltender, named one of the best 100 NHL players of all time in 2017
- Floyd Smith, NHL player and coach
- Gord Smith, NHL player
- Nicholas Tritton, Olympian, Judo

== Local media ==
- CHLK-FM 88.1 myFM Radio

== Sister cities ==
- Perth, Perth & Kinross, Scotland
- Perth, Australia
- Asago, Hyōgo, Japan

== See also ==
- List of municipalities in Ontario
