= Cambridge War Memorial =

War memorial in Cambridge, England

Coordinates: 52°11′42.14″N 0°7′51.86″E

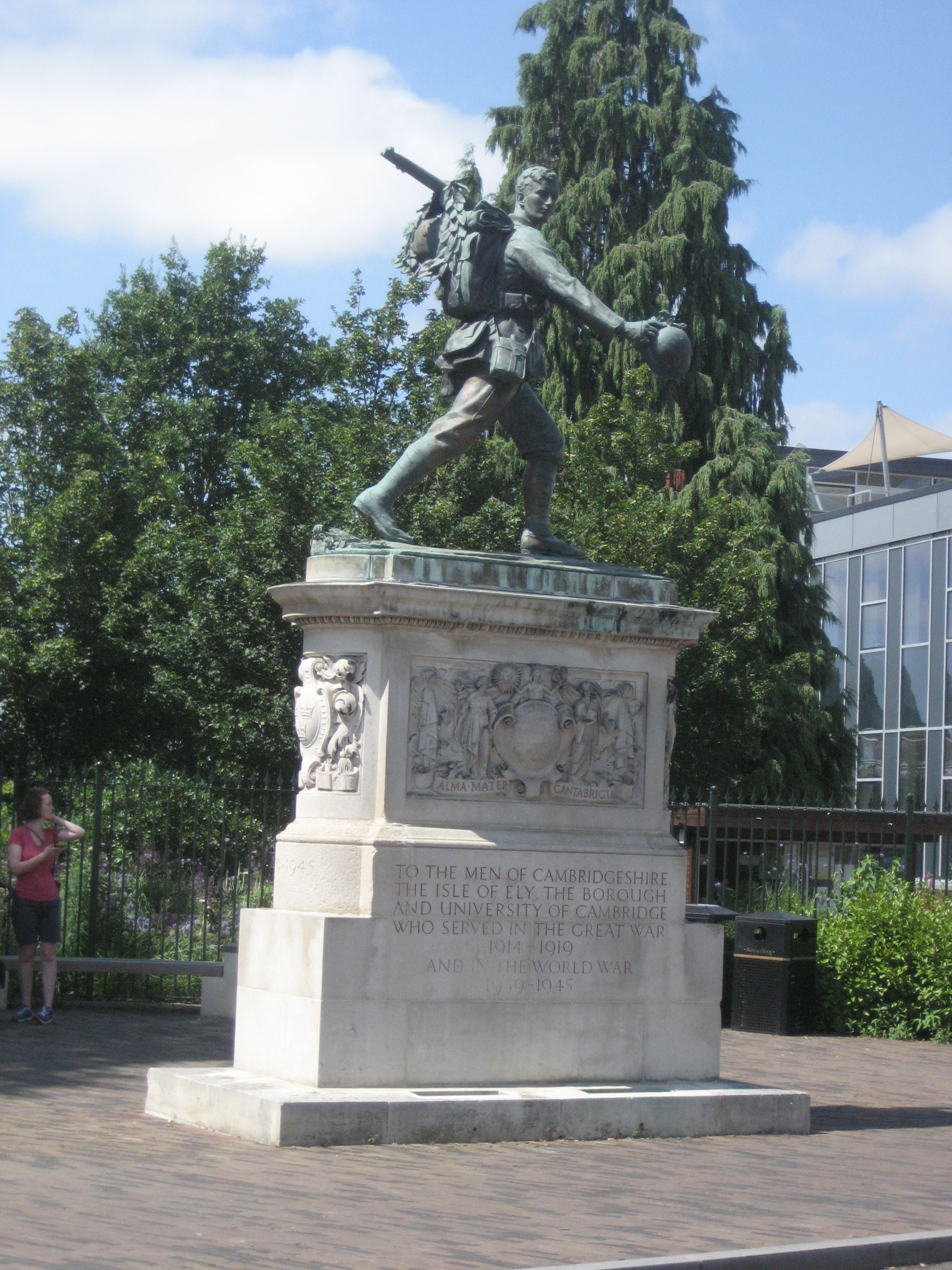
Cambridge War Memorial in 2014

Cambridge War Memorial is a war memorial on Hills Road, Cambridge, outside Cambridge University Botanic Garden. It comprises a bronze statue of a marching soldier by Canadian sculptor Robert Tait McKenzie, known as "The Homecoming" or sometimes "Coming Home", mounted on a heavily carved limestone plinth. It was unveiled in 1922, and became a Grade II listed building in 1996.

== Background ==
After the First World War, there were long debates in Cambridge about the appropriate type of war memorial, its location, and how the necessary funds should be raised, involving representatives of the city and the university. Proposals included a clock tower, cottages for injured soldiers, public amenities, or improvements at Addenbrooke's Hospital.

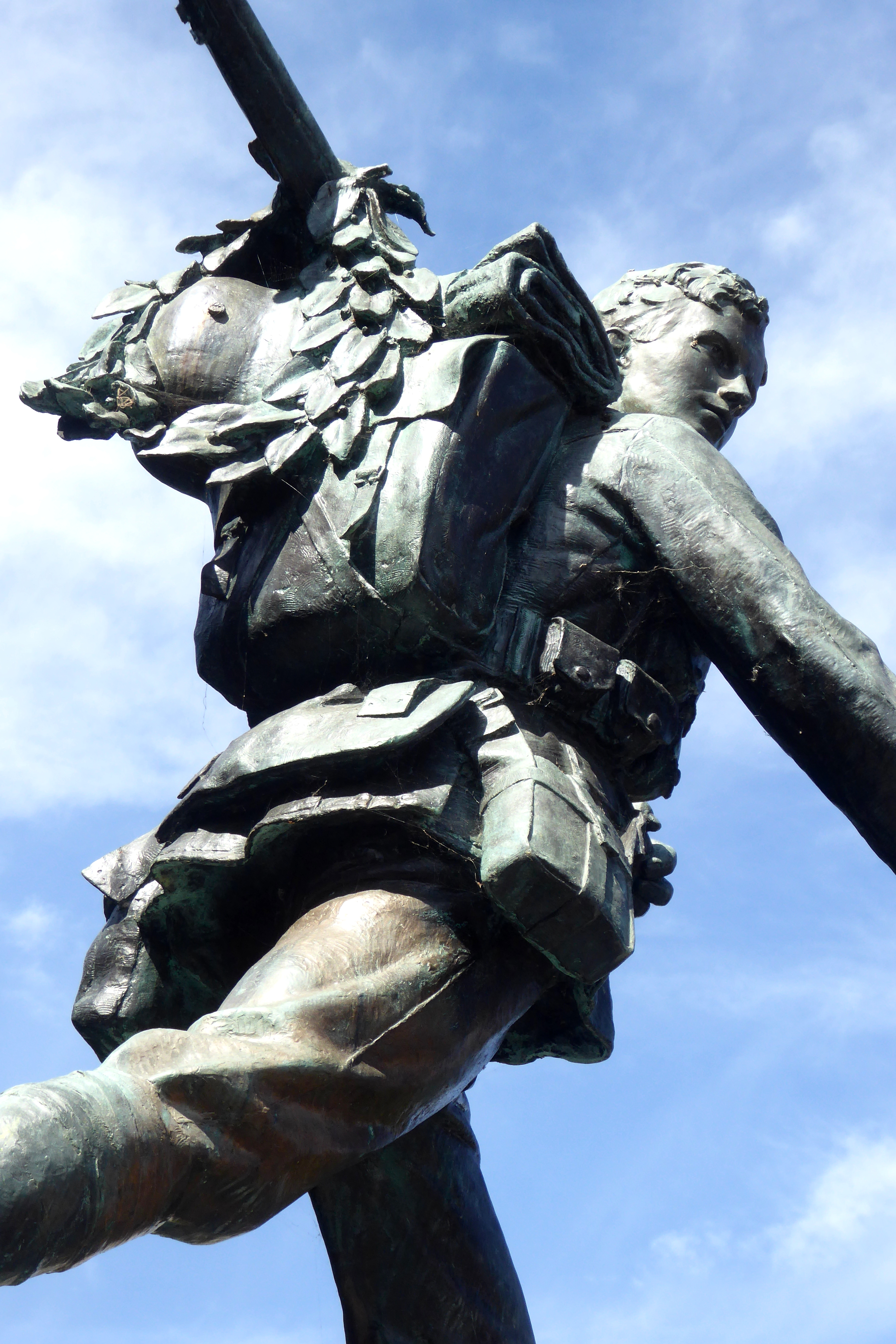
The statue atop the memorial

A memorial committee was convened in January 1919 by the Lord Lieutenant of Cambridgeshire Charles Adeane, with its members drawn from Cambridgeshire County Council, the borough councils in Cambridge and Ely, and the University of Cambridge. Members included the Vice-Chancellor of the University of Cambridge Arthur Shipley (who was also Master of Christ's College, Cambridge); the Mayor of Cambridge Ralph Starr and his deputy, the previous year's mayor, Rev Dr Edmund Pearce (who was also Master of Corpus Christi College, Cambridge); Colonel Walter Harding of Madingley Hall and John Chivers from the Chivers and Sons jam making business in Histon; the Dean of Ely Cathedral Alexander Kirkpatrick (also former Masters of Selwyn College, Cambridge), the Mayor of Wisbech, and the surveyor Charles Bidwell of Bidwells. In April 1919, the committee recommended three parallel memorials: one at Addenbrooke's, a memorial listing the names of the war dead at Ely Cathedral, and a large monument in Cambridge itself.

Fundraising carried on through 1919 to raise the estimated £30,000 for all three works, two-thirds of which was earmarked for Addenbrooke's, but progress was slow. By December 1919, only £12,000 had been raised, of which £6,000 was donated to Addenbrooke's and put towards building a new nurses' home, which was completed in 1924; its origins as a war memorial had been forgotten by the time the hospital moved away from the Old Addenbrooke's Site in 1976. The colleges of the university contributed little, as they were raising funds to commemorate their own war dead in their own chapels (and very few of them had served in the Cambridgeshire Regiment), and towns and villages elsewhere in Cambridgeshire were also building their own local war memorials.

A meeting on 16 October 1920 approved the memorial schemes for Ely and Cambridge. The proposed Ely memorial became a series of oak panels that were erected in St George's chapel, where the 6,000 casualties of the war are listed alphabetically, sorted by town and parish, without distinction of rank. The panels cost £3,500, and were dedicated on 11 May 1922, with an address by General Lord Horne, commander of Eastern Command.

The third memorial, the monument in Cambridge, was to become the Cambridge War Memorial. Shipley recommended the Canadian sculptor Robert Tait McKenzie to design a large 8 feet (2.4 m) sculpture of a soldier, to represent Victory, on a 12 feet (3.7 m) pedestal. The meeting also approved the site some distance south of the centre of the city of Cambridge, on Hills Road near the railway station. A site on Parker's Piece, closer to the city centre, used in the war as a parade ground, was rejected. Only £3,500 was left from the fundraising towards the £4,500 cost. To save money, the sculpture was reduced in height to 7 feet (2.1 m). The architect was George Hubbard .

== Description ==
The memorial is topped by a bronze statue of a soldier, wearing the uniform of the Cambridgeshire Regiment, slightly larger than life-size at 7 feet (2.1 m) tall. McKenzie modelled the soldier on Kenneth Hamilton, who was an undergraduate at Christ's College, Cambridge.

The soldier marches purposefully with his rifle sloped over his left shoulder, his stride deliberately over-extended by several inches. He walks home up Hills Road, toward the centre of Cambridge, with a backward glance over his right shoulder along Station Road towards Cambridge railway station. He is bareheaded, holding his helmet in his right hand, which also clasps a rose, with another rose fallen at his feet. He carries a laurel wreath on his rifle, which also encircles a German helmet carried on his backpack as a trophy of war.

The rectangular plinth is constructed of brick faced with limestone, with rounded ends like a sarcophagus. The top half of the plinth has high-relief carvings of armorial bearings. An inscription on the lower half is picked out with red paint: "TO THE MEN OF CAMBRIDGESHIRE / AND THE ISLE OF ELY, THE BOROUGH / AND UNIVERSITY OF CAMBRIDGE / WHO SERVED IN THE GREAT WAR / 1914–1919" to which was later added "AND IN THE WORLD WAR / 1939–1945"

== Reception ==
The memorial was unveiled at the junction of Hills Road and Station Road at 3 pm on 3 July 1922 by the Duke of York (later George VI), who was already in Cambridge that day to attend the Royal Agricultural Society's Royal Show, and also to receive an honorary degree. The brief ceremony was attended by thousands of people, with crowds of schoolchildren, a guard of honour from the Cambridgeshire Regiment, ushers from the British Legion, and the Lord Lieutenant, the Mayor George Hawkins, and the Vice-Chancellor, now Rev Dr Edmund Pearce, in attendance; however, most from the university were away during the summer vacation. (The bronze was not finished in time for the official ceremony, and a gilded plaster cast took its place; the bronze was erected later, and the memorial was dedicated at a ceremony the following year, on 3 July 1923). Further inscriptions added after the Second World War.

The memorial was relocated in 1952 from a position nearer the station, to an island in the middle of Hills Road, at its junction of Station Road. It became a Grade II listed building in 1996. It was moved again as part of the Botanic House development, and reinstalled in 2012 on the south side of the road, closer to Cambridge University Botanic Garden

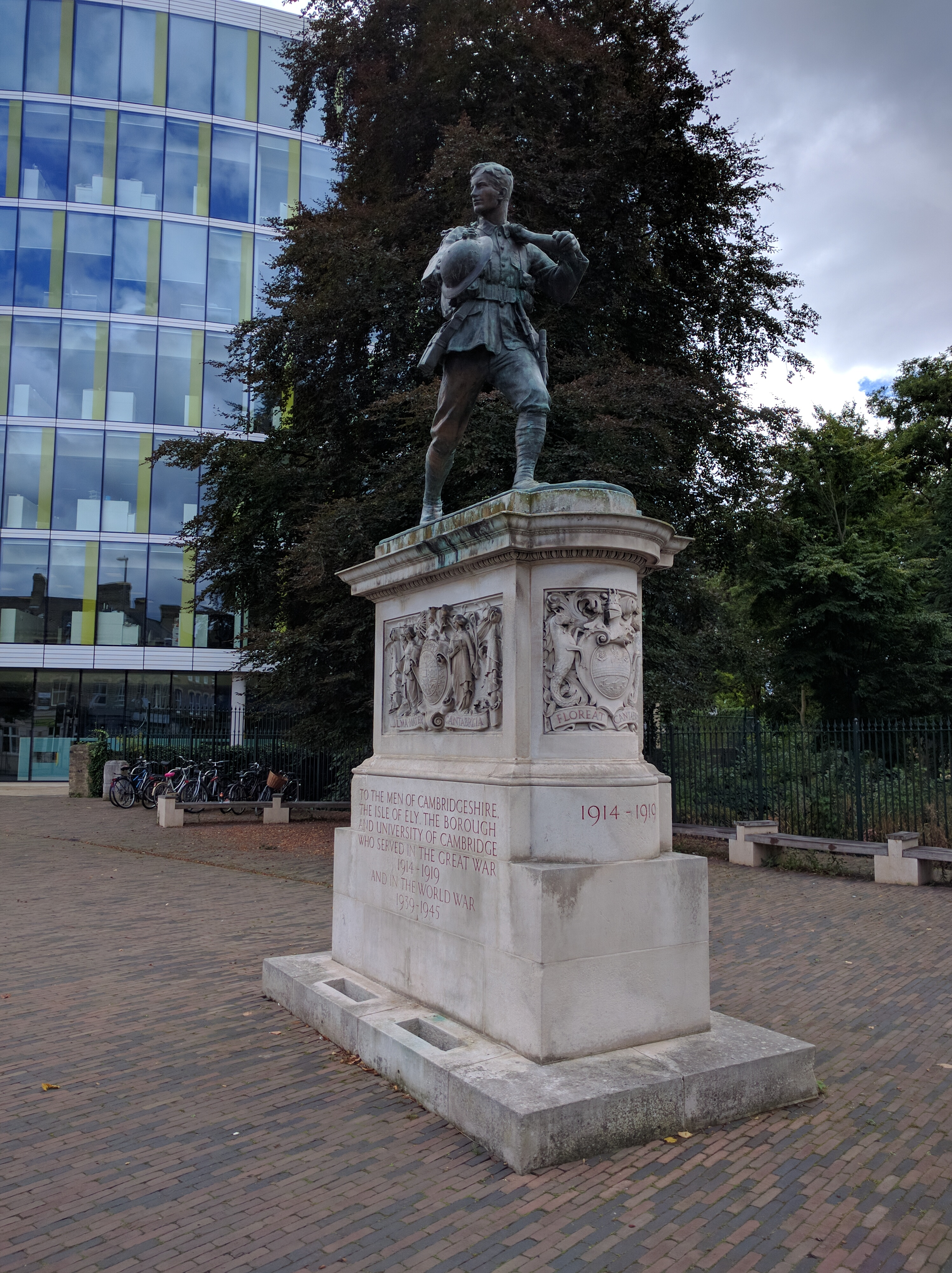
Cambridge War Memorial in 2016

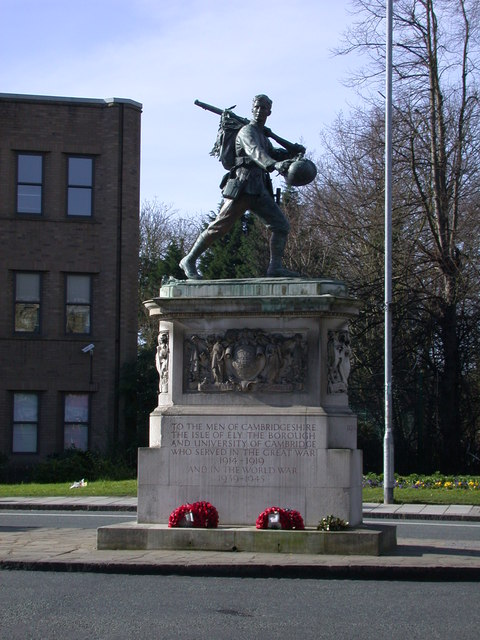
Cambridge War Memorial in its previous position, in 2007

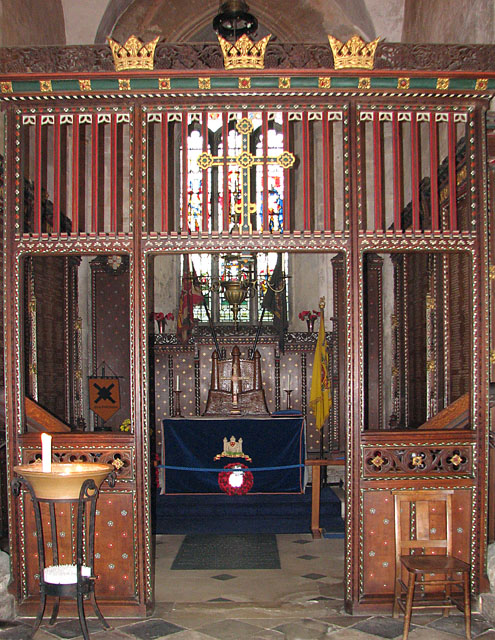
St George's chapel, Ely Cathedral
