= Temple of Reason =

French Revolution-era institution intended to replace churches

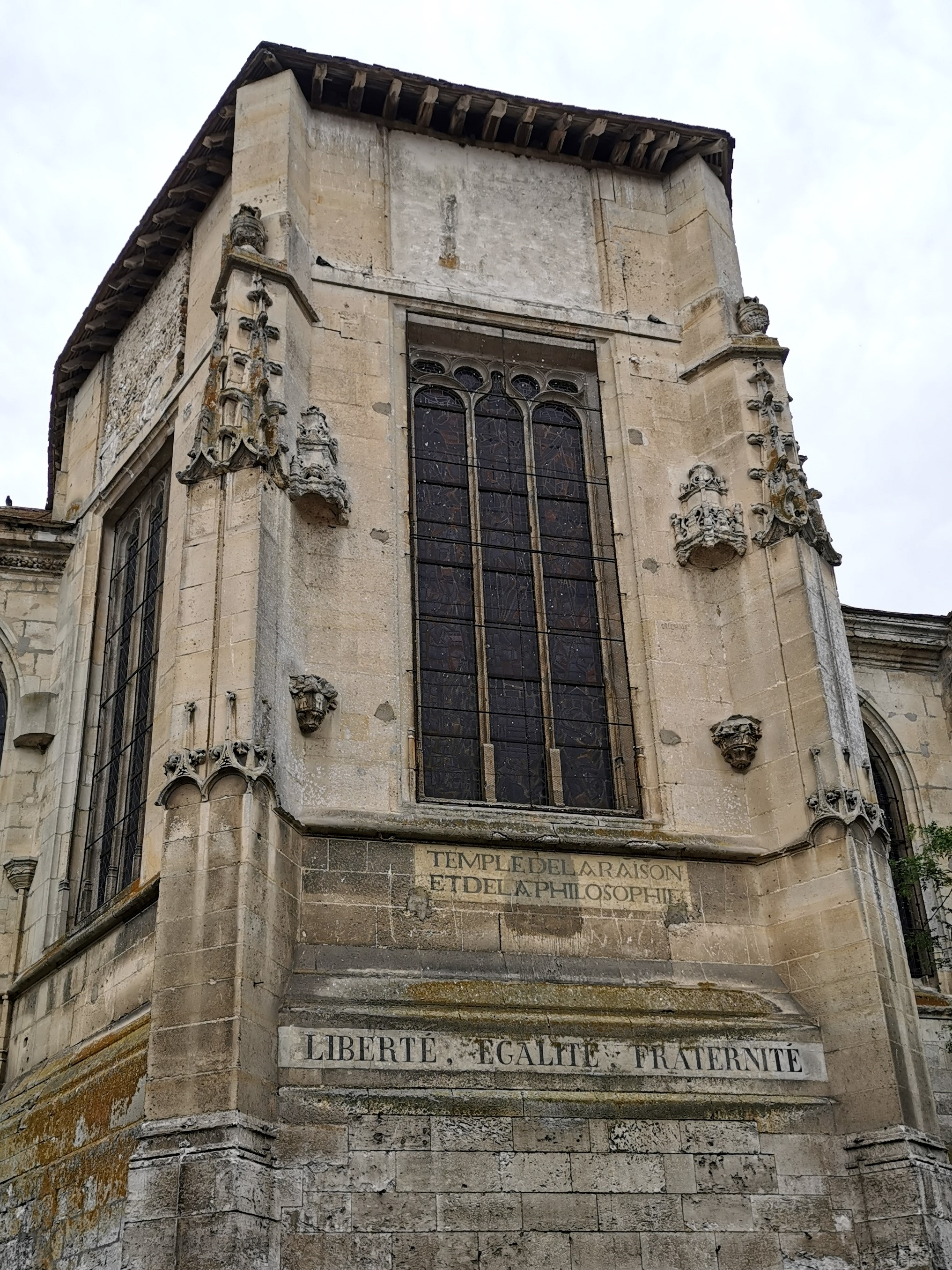
A Republican inscription on a former church: "Temple of reason and philosophy", Saint Martin, Ivry-La-Bataille

A Temple of Reason (French: Temple de la Raison) was a state atheist temple for the Cult of Reason, a belief system created during the French Revolution to replace Christianity. This "religion" was supposed to be universal and to spread the ideas of the revolution, summarized in its "Liberté, égalité, fraternité" motto which was inscribed on the Temples.

== Services ==
The symbols of Christianity were covered up, and the symbols of the Cult of Reason replaced them. In the Churches of Reason, there were specially created services meant to replace the Christian liturgy.

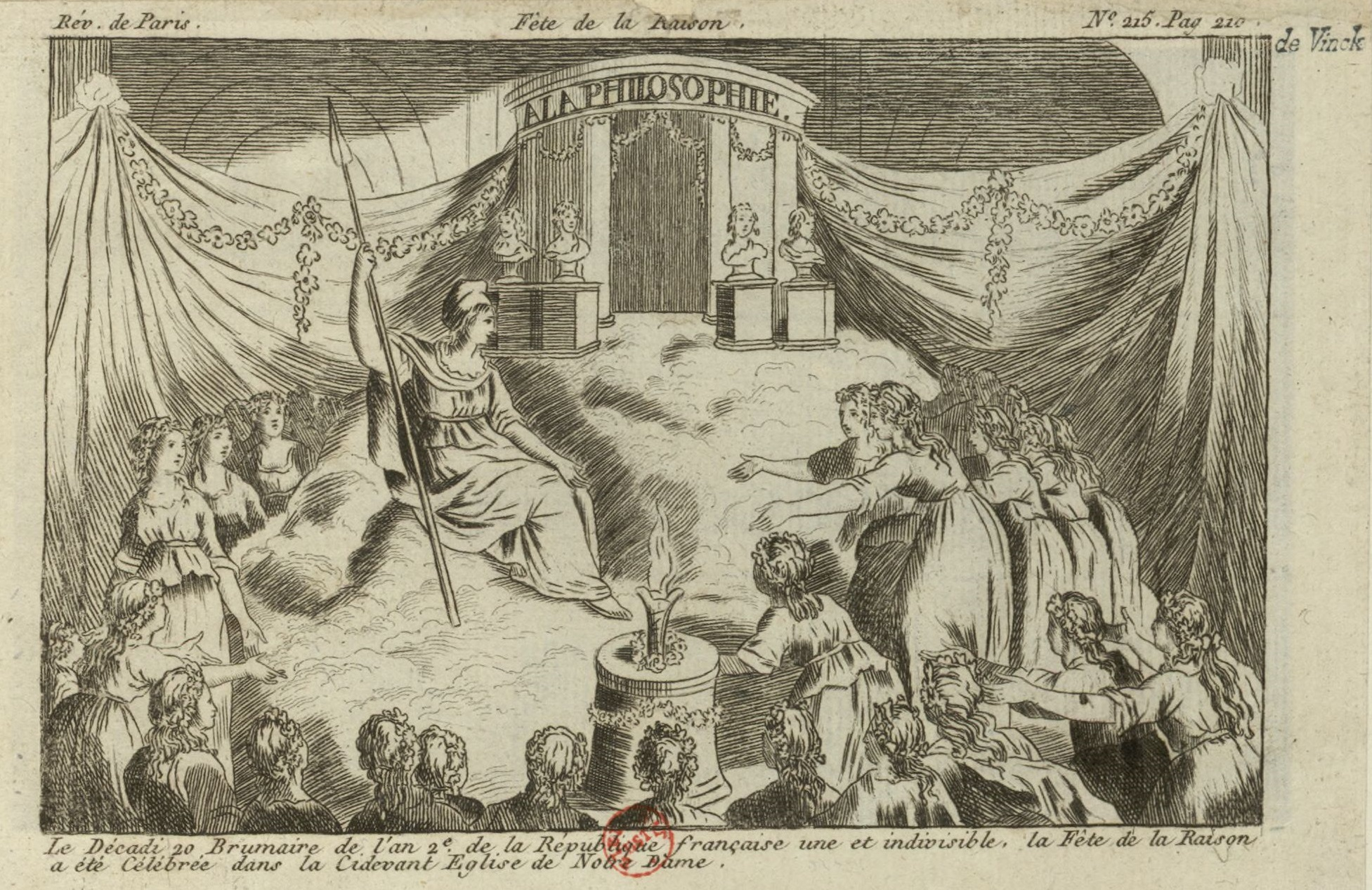
Feast of Reason at the Notre-Dame

For instance, at the Notre-Dame Cathedral in Paris, on 10 November 1793, a special ritual was held for the "Feast of Reason": the nave had an improvised mountain on which stood a Greek temple dedicated to Philosophy and decorated with busts of philosophers. At the base of the mountain was located an altar dedicated to Reason, and in front of it was a torch of Truth. The ceremony included the crowd paying homage to an opera singer dressed in blue, white, red (the colours of the Republic), personifying the Goddess of Liberty.

According to the conservative critics of the French Revolution, within the Temple of Reason, "atheism was enthroned". English theologian Thomas Hartwell Horne and biblical scholar Samuel Davidson write that "churches were converted into 'temples of reason', in which atheistical and licentious homilies were substituted for the proscribed service".

== Churches transformed into Temples of Reason ==
After Catholicism was banned in 1792, many of its churches were turned into Temples of Reason, including:

- the Notre-Dame de Paris Cathedral (10 November 1793)
- the Cathedral of Our Lady of Chartres
- the Church of Saint-Sulpice
- the Église Saint-Paul-Saint-Louis
- the Basilica of Saint-Denis
- the church of Les Invalides
- the church of Saint Thomas Aquinas
- the Panthéon de Paris
- the Church Saint Pierre from Montmartre
- the Cathedral of Our Lady of Reims
- the Troyes Cathedral
- the Notre Dame de Versailles Church
- the Église Saint-Pierre de Caen
- the Église Saint-Martin d'Ivry-la-Bataille
- the Église Saint-Jacques-le-Majeur-et-Saint-Christophe d'Houdan
- the Church of St. James on Coudenberg

== Demise ==
By spring of 1794, the Cult of Reason drew criticism from the French Government especially the Committee of Public Safety. Robespierre, for one, believed that the violent acts taken by members of the Cult of Reason against religion were antithetical to the enlightenment principles on which the Republic was founded. Eventually the Cult of Reason was put to rest by the establishment of a new, deistic religion for the Republic, the Cult of the Supreme Being.
