= Ethel O'Neil =

Canadian poet and musician

Ethel O'Neil (1880–1952) was a Canadian poet and musician who married Robert Tait McKenzie, a Canadian sculptor and educator, in 1907.

== Biography ==
Ethel O'Neil was born in Hamilton, Ontario, Canada in 1880. She was educated at the Hamilton Collegiate Institute and studied with J.E.P. Aldous, founder of the Hamilton School of Music. She also studied at the Virgil School of Music in New York.

She was appointed director of music at Science Hill Female Academy in Shelbyville, Kentucky. In 1907, she went to Berlin to complete her music education and became engaged to the sculptor R. Tait McKenzie, who crossed on the same boat, the S.S. "Marquette", from Philadelphia. They were married in August 1907 at Dublin Castle, with the Earl and Countess of Aberdeen, who had known Tait McKenzie earlier when he was household physician to the Canadian Governor-General's staff, as part of the wedding party.

The couple moved to Philadelphia, Pennsylvania from Montreal when Tait McKenzie was appointed as the first professor of Physical Education at the University of Pennsylvania. Ethel O'Neil McKenzie was involved in the cultural and civic life of the city. She arranged music recitals and lectured on music. A collection of her poetry, "Secret Snow", was published in 1932. In 1930, the McKenzies bought the Mill of Kintail in Almonte, Ontario, Canada for their summer home, and supervised the mill's restoration. R. Tait McKenzie died in 1938 and Ethel McKenzie died in 1952. The Mill of Kintail is a conservation area and museum managed by the Mississippi Valley Conservation Authority and Lanark County, Ontario.
