= Statue of Edgar Fahs Smith =

Statue in Philadelphia, Pennsylvania, US

Edgar Fahs Smith
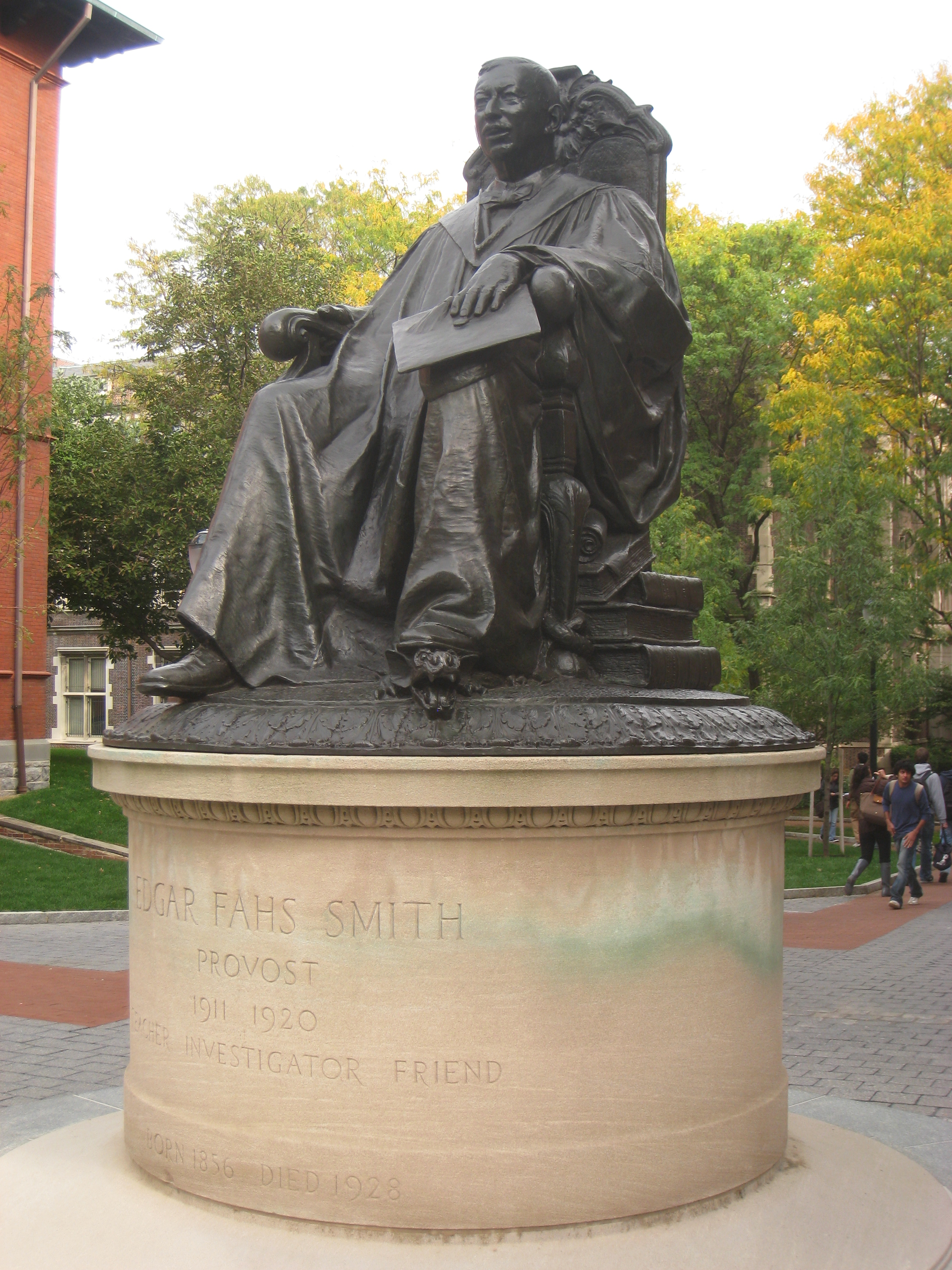
- The statue in 2010
- Interactive map of Edgar Fahs Smith
- Location: University of Pennsylvania, Philadelphia, Pennsylvania, United States
- Coordinates: 39°57′6″N 75°11′32″W
- Designer: R. Tait McKenzie (statue); Horace Trumbauer (pedestal)
- Fabricator: Roman Bronze Works
- Type: Statue
- Material: Bronze; Limestone
- Height: 9.8 feet (3.0 m)
- Completion date: 1925
- Dedicated date: June 12, 1926
- Dedicated to: Edgar Fahs Smith

Edgar Fahs Smith is a monumental statue located on the campus of the University of Pennsylvania in Philadelphia, Pennsylvania, United States. The statue was designed by sculptor R. Tait McKenzie and honors its namesake, a former provost of the university.

== History ==
Edgar Fahs Smith was an American chemist and academic who served as the provost of the University of Pennsylvania from 1911 to 1920. In addition, he was the director of the university's chemistry laboratory and had served as the president of both the American Chemical Society and the American Philosophical Society. In March 1924, multiple news outlets reported that a statue in Smith's honor was planned to be erected on the university's campus as a gift from university trustee John C. Bell, who was also donating a statue of former Provost Charles Custis Harrison. For the Smith statue, R. Tait McKenzie was chosen as the designer. McKenzie was, at the time, a professor and director of the university's physical education department, although he was also a skilled sculptor, having designed a piece for the 1912 Summer Olympics that was later used as the design for some medals. In addition to the Smith monument, McKenzie would also design statues of Benjamin Franklin and George Whitefield for the university. While McKenzie was responsible for the statue, the pedestal of the monument was designed by architect Horace Trumbauer. The statue was sculpted in 1925 and cast by the Roman Bronze Works of New York City. The monument was dedicated on June 12, 1926.

In 1992, the sculpture was surveyed as part of the Save Outdoor Sculpture! project.

== Design ==
The monument consists of a bronze statue of Smith measuring approximately 5.8 feet (1.8 m) tall atop a limestone pedestal that is about 4 feet (1.2 m) tall. The pedestal is cylindrical and contains an ornamental border. Smith is clothed in an academic robe and seated next to a stack of four books. Both of Smith's arms are resting on the arms of the chair, while his left hand holds his academic cap. Smith's left foot rests on the head of a snake whose tail is curled around a leg of the chair. According to a 2019 article in Penn Today, this figure represents "error" being destroyed by science. On the back of the monument is inscribed the foundry marks and McKenzie's signature, while on the spine of the stack of books is the inscription: "A/TRIBUTE/OF/AFFECTION/FROM/JOHN C. BELL/CLASS/1884". On the front of the monument is the inscription: "EDGAR FAHS SMITH/PROVOST/1911 1920/TEACHER INVESTIGATOR FRIEND/BORN 1856 DIED 1928".

The statue faces the Fisher Fine Arts Library, near 34th Street. It is located at the west end of Smith Walk, so named because of the statue, while the east end of the walkway is marked by a war memorial.

== Sources ==
- Brockmeier, Erica K. (August 30, 2019). "Stories of Penn scientists: Edgar Fahs Smith". Penn Today. Archived from the original on August 9, 2020.
- Dowlin, Cornell M., ed. (1940). The University of Pennsylvania Today: Its Buildings, Departments, & Work. University of Pennsylvania Press. ISBN 978-1-5128-0147-7.
- Hassler, Donna J. (2001). "Robert Tait McKenzie (1867–1938)". In Tolles, Thayer (ed.). American Sculpture in the Metropolitan Museum of Art. Vol. 2: A Catalogue of Works by Artists Born between 1865 and 1885. Metropolitan Museum of Art. Yale University Press. pp. 503–505. ISBN 978-0-87099-923-9.
- "Medical News". The Journal of the American Medical Association. 82 (11). American Medical Association: 895–901. March 15, 1924. doi:10.1001/jama.1924.02650370063023.
- Mercer, E. LeRoy (February 1944). "R. Tait McKenzie - - 34 Years at the University of Pennsylvania". The Journal of Health and Physical Education. 15 (2). American Association for Health, Physical Education, and Recreation: 58, 85–86. doi:10.1080/23267240.1944.10623173.
- "Educational Notes and News". School and Society. XIX (479): 252–256. March 1, 1924.
- "Edgar Fahs Smith, (sculpture)". Smithsonian Institution Research Information System. Archived from the original on October 18, 2021.
- Thomas, George E.; Brownlee, David B. (2000). Building America's First University: An Historical and Architectural Guide to the University of Pennsylvania. University of Pennsylvania Press. ISBN 978-0-8122-3515-9.
- "Discovering Outdoor Campus Sculptures of Penn People". University of Pennsylvania Almanac. 62 (10). October 20, 2015. Archived from the original on October 18, 2021.
