= Franklin Inn Club =

Private social club in Philadelphia, Pennsylvania, U.S.

- Formation: 1902
- Type: social club
- Tax ID no.: 23-0597690
- Location: Philadelphia
- Website: thefranklininn.com

The Franklin Inn Club is a private social club in Philadelphia, Pennsylvania. Founded in 1902 as a literary society, it is one of the four historic gentlemen's clubs in Philadelphia's Center City and was the first to open membership to women in Philadelphia.

Under the classification "501(c)(7) Social and Recreation Clubs" it claimed total 2024 revenue of $490,918 and total assets of $3,858,404.

== Early history ==
The Franklin Inn Club was founded by the Philadelphia physician and writer Silas Weir Mitchell; J. William White, and seven other members of the University Club at Penn as a social venue for published authors and illustrators. It soon became a gathering place for novelists, poets, scholars, actors, playwrights, and journalists. The clubhouse hosted amateur theatricals, and also served as home to The Philobiblon Club, founded in 1893 for book collectors and dealers. Visitors to the club in the early 20th century included Bram Stoker, William Butler Yeats, Christopher Morley, Carl Sandburg, Ezra Pound, and William Carlos Williams. Following World War II, qualifications for admission were broadened to include those “contributing notably to the literary, artistic or intellectual life of the community." The club's all-male membership policy ended in 1980. The charter, bylaws, and lists of its original founders and directors are documented in the 1914 Book of the Franklin Inn Club

== Clubhouse ==
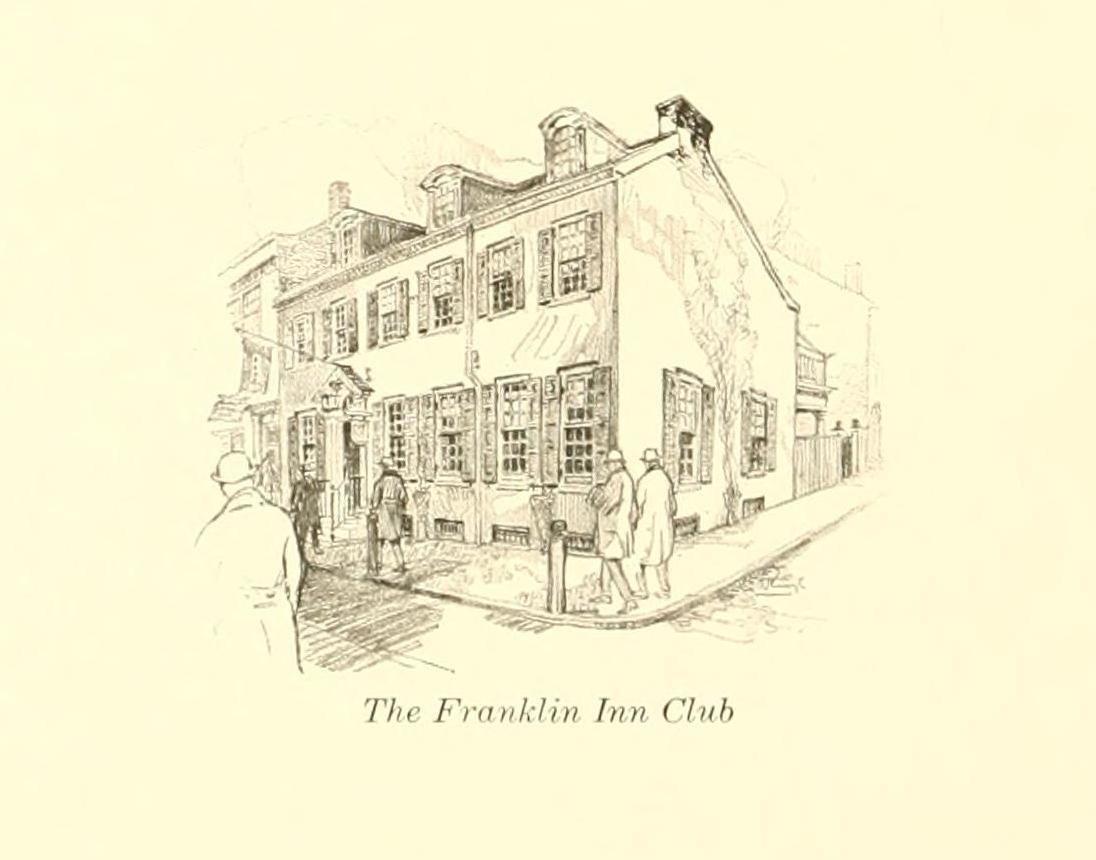
Engraving of the clubhouse, 1922

First located at 1218 Chancellor Street, the Franklin Inn Club in 1907 moved to its current home at 205 South Camac Street. To create the Inn, the architect Francis G. Caldwell combined several small rowhouses, dating from the early 19th century, in neocolonial style. The building was added to the Philadelphia Register of Historic Places in 1961. The interior of the building was designed to evoke the 18th century coffeehouse envisioned by the club's namesake, Benjamin Franklin. Its original sign is now part of the collection of the McClung Museum of Natural History & Culture.

== Modern club ==
The club hosts conversations and debates among its members regarding current events and art, and hosts speakers. Events include the club's annual J. William White dinner that is held near the birthday of Benjamin Franklin. The clubhouse continues to serve as a playhouse for stage performances, and is a venue for the Philadelphia Fringe Festival. The Inn's second floor library holds its collections of art and books written by, illustrated by, and about club members. In 2018 the club served as the set for parts of an episode of the television series Full Frontal with Samantha Bee, airing on TBS.

== Notable past members ==
- E. Digby Baltzell - Sociologist, academic and author. He became an eminent professor at the University of Pennsylvania.
- Lenora Berson - Philadelphia political strategist and commentator.
- Judith Eden - Philadelphia lawyer, civic activist, and anti-blight crusader.
- Daniel Hoffman - United States Poet Laureate (1973-1974) and author of works on Edgar Allan Poe and Paul Bunyan.
- Silas Weir Mitchell - Distinguished physician, Founder and first president of The Franklin Inn Club
- Howard Pyle - Illustrator and author, primarily of books for young people. Known for The Merry Adventures of Robin Hood (1883), The Story of King Arthur and His Knights (1903) among the books he authored.
- John C. Raines - Methodist minister, political activist, professor of religion at Temple University for over 40 years.
- Nathan Sivin aka Xiwen (席文), Eminent China scholar, historian, essayist, and writer. Emeritus Professor at University of Pennsylvania
- J. William White - Surgeon, teacher, explorer, author, and early promoter of physical culture. Appointed to the John Rhea Barton Professorship of Surgery at the University of Pennsylvania Hospital from 1900 to 1912.
- Owen Wister - Historian, novelist and “father” of western fiction. He is best remembered for writing The Virginian.
- N. C. Wyeth - A pupil of artist Howard Pyle, became one of America's greatest illustrators. Wyeth created more than 3,000 paintings and illustrated 112 books. He's best known for illustrating Treasure Island and Robinson Crusoe. His youngest son Andrew Wyeth is one of the best-known U.S. artists of the middle 20th century.
