= Mill of Kintail Conservation Area =

Preserved area in Ontario, Canada

Coordinates: 45°14′47″N 76°15′12″W

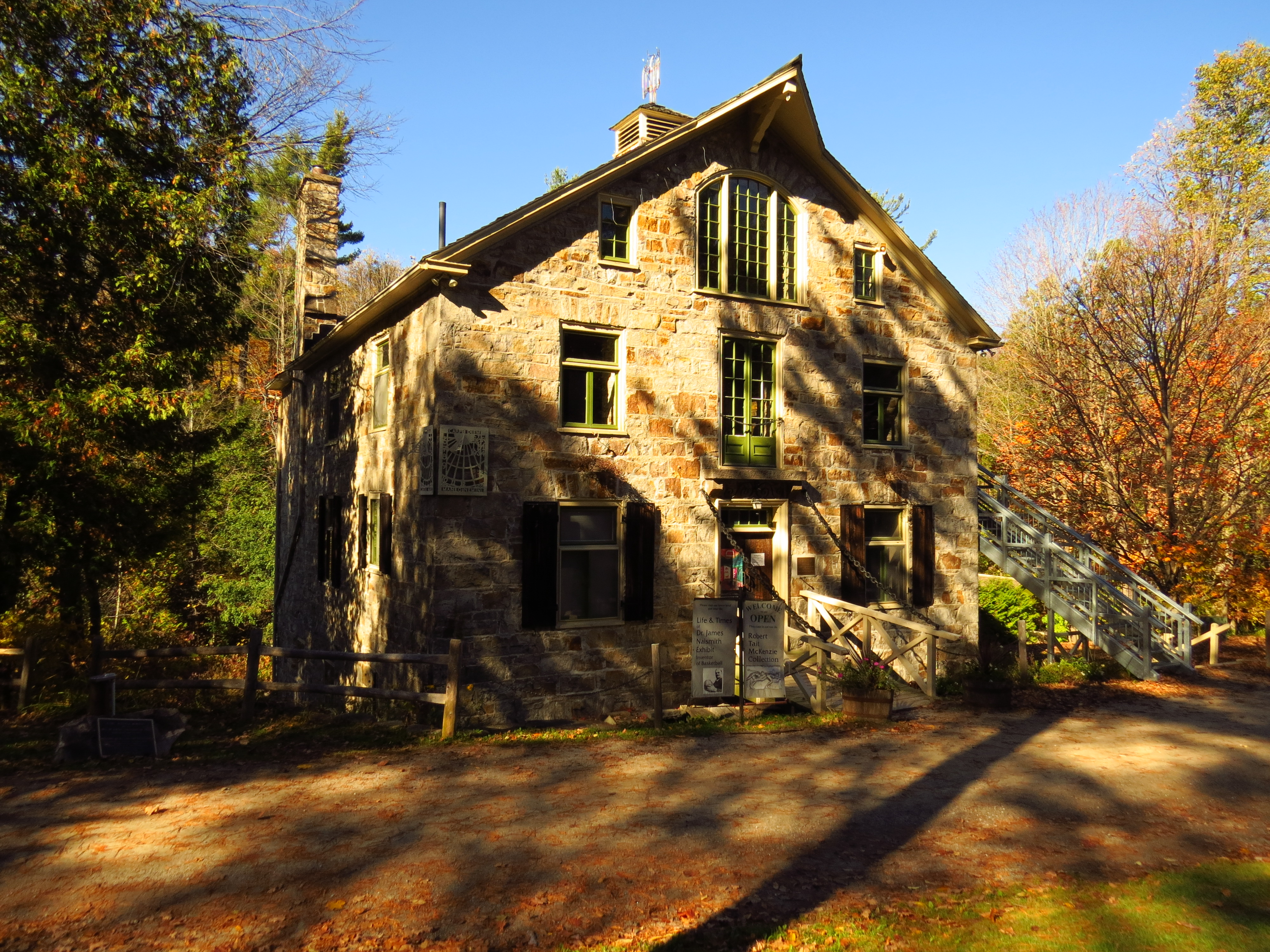
Grist mill and museum

The Mill of Kintail Conservation Area is a 152 acres (62 ha) preserve operated by the Mississippi Valley Conservation Authority, in Mississippi Mills, Ontario, Canada.

The preserve features an 1830s grist mill that was a former summer home and sculpture studio of medical doctor, sculptor and Ramsay Township native, R. Tait McKenzie who kept the mill in the 20th century.

The mill is home to the R. Tait Mackenzie Museum, which features many of the artist's sculptures and memorabilia, and the Naismith Museum about James Naismith, another famous native of Ramsay Township and the inventor of basketball.

== See also ==
- List of single-artist museums
