= R. Tait McKenzie =

Canadian sculptor

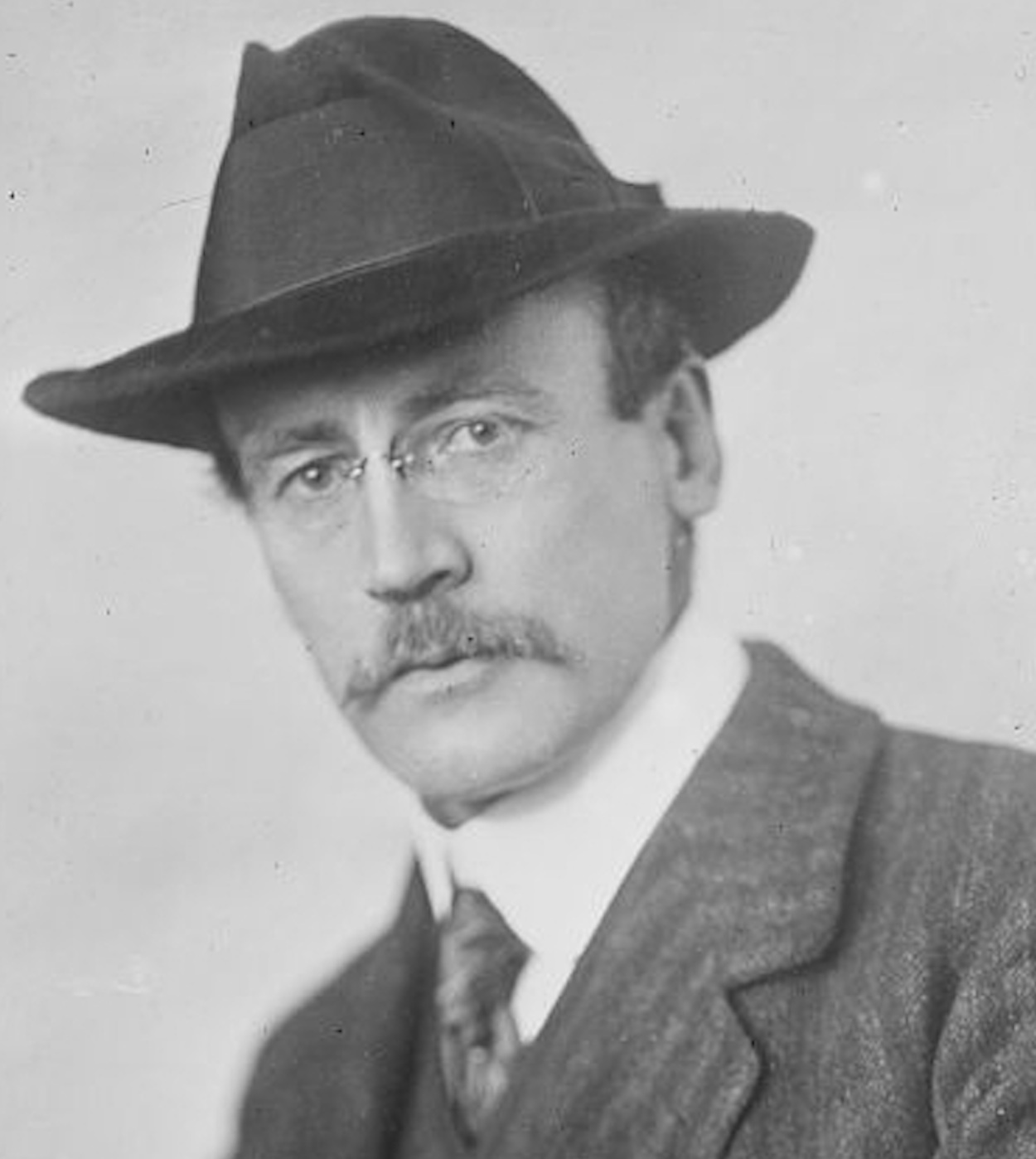
- McKenzie, c. 1910s
- Born: Robert Tait McKenzie; May 26, 1867; Ramsay Township, Lanark County, Ontario, Canada
- Died: April 28, 1938 (aged 70); Philadelphia, Pennsylvania, U.S.
- Known for: Sculptor
- Notable work: The Ideal Scout; Scots American War Memorial
- Spouse: Ethel O'Neil (m. 1907)

Robert Tait McKenzie RCA (sometimes written MacKenzie) RCA (May 26, 1867 – April 28, 1938) was a Canadian physician, educator, sculptor, athlete, soldier and Scouter. Born in Ramsay Township, Lanark County, Ontario, Canada, he attended McGill University in Montreal as an undergraduate and medical student, and was an instructor in its medical school beginning in 1894. In 1904, he moved to the United States to teach at the University of Pennsylvania in Philadelphia, Pennsylvania. In the 1930s, he returned to the county of his birth, retiring to the Mill of Kintail in Almonte.

He pioneered physical fitness programs in Canada. During World War I, his methods and inventions for restoring and rehabilitating wounded soldiers laid a foundation for modern physiotherapy practices.

== Biography ==
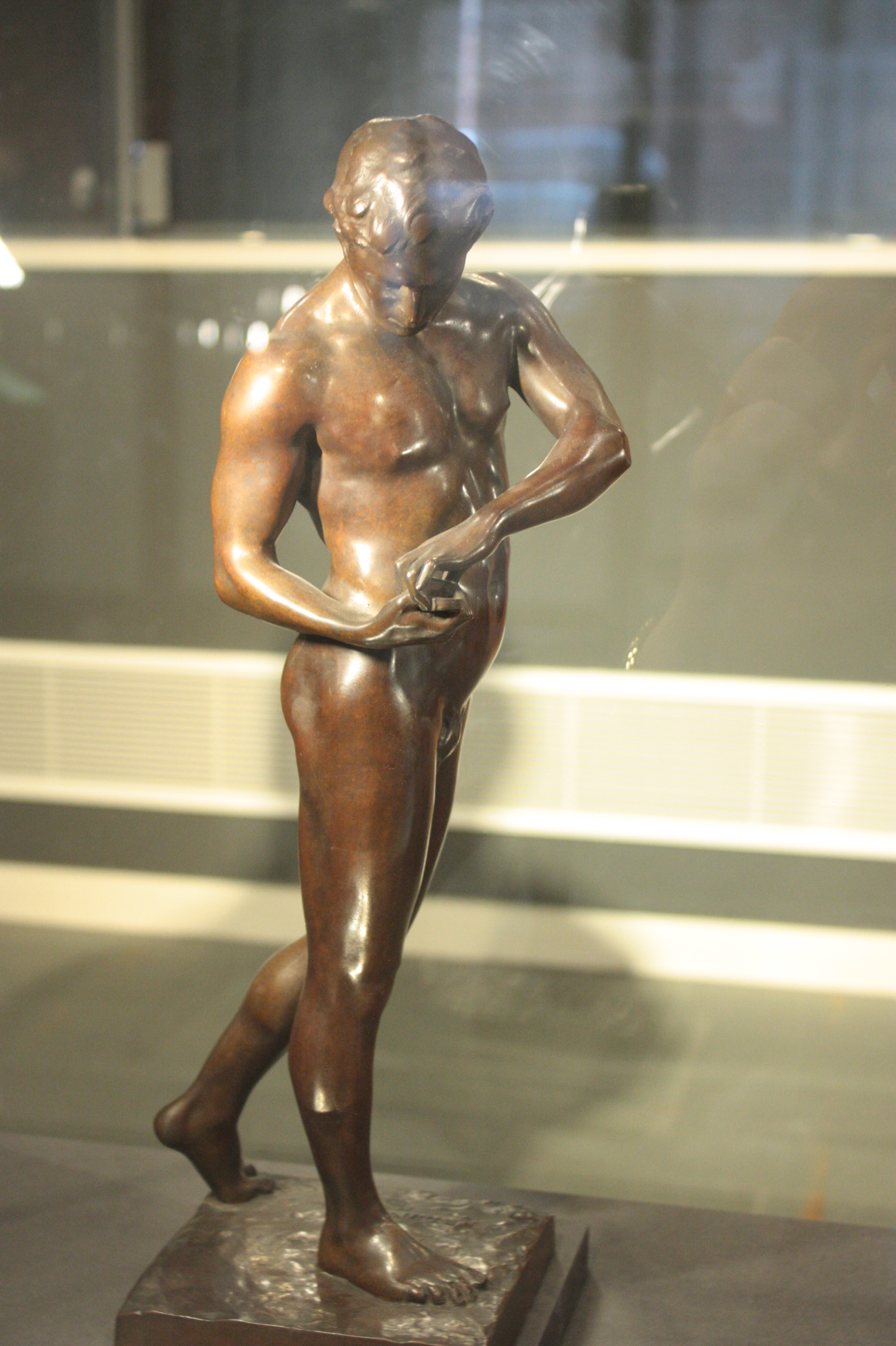
The Athlete c. 1903

McKenzie was born on May 26, 1867, in the township of Ramsay (now part of the Town of Mississippi Mills), in Ontario's Lanark County. A childhood friend was James Naismith, the inventor of basketball, with whom he attended McGill University. As a child, McKenzie did not regard himself as an athlete, saying,

"Looking back with an eye of memory I see a rather delicate child, sensitive at being called pale-faced, a roamer of the woods and fields with a mind filled with romance that Sir Walter Scott and Fenimore Cooper alone could instill, going unwillingly to school, distracted by thoughts of the Deerslayer..."

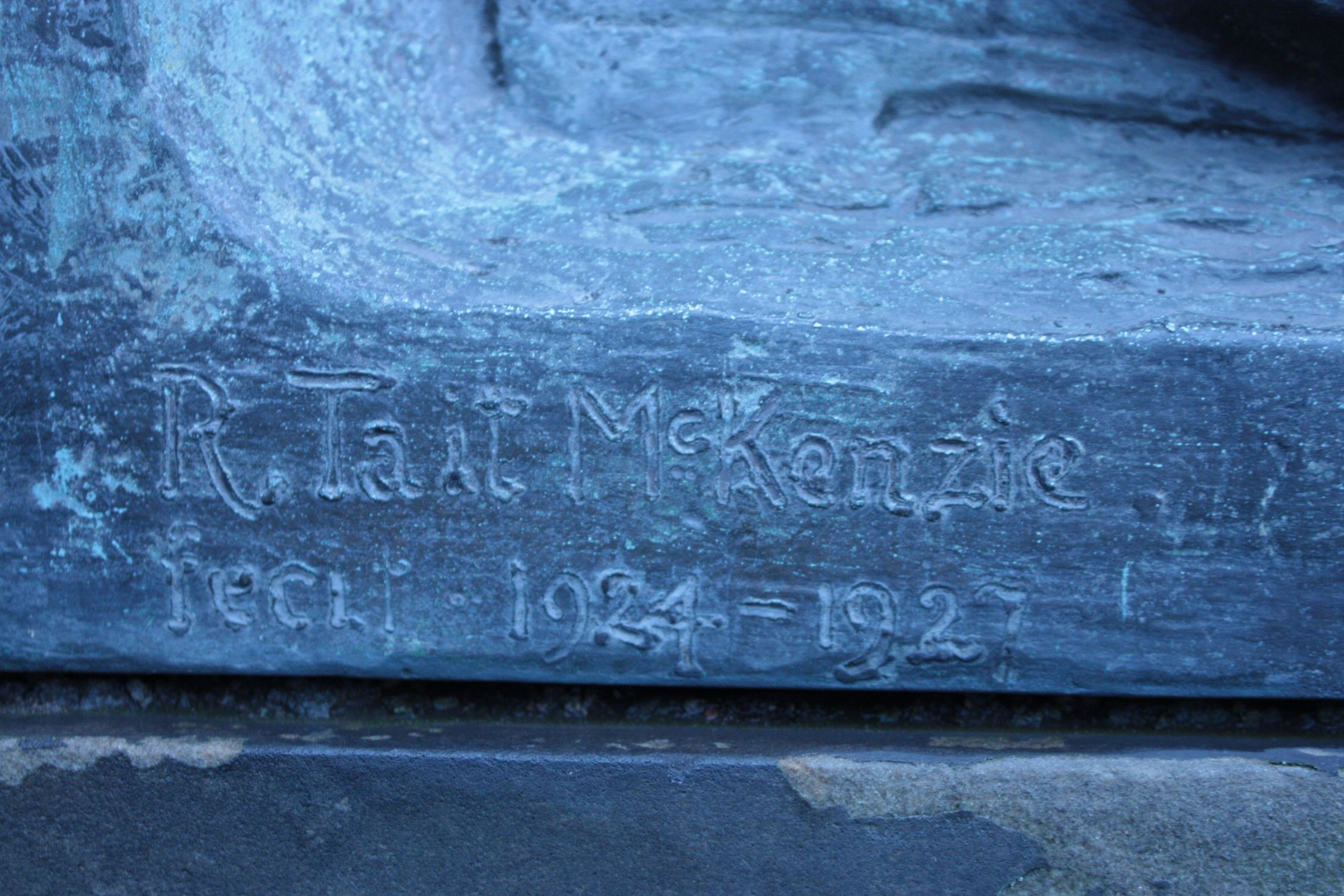
R Tait McKenzie's signature on The Call

In preparation for McGill he attended Ottawa Collegiate Institute (currently known as Lisgar Collegiate Institute) in 1883 at nearby Ottawa, Ontario.

=== McGill University ===
This attitude changed after he enrolled at McGill University in 1885. A pre-med major, he developed a great appreciation for and attraction to athletics and physical training. McKenzie became involved in acrobatics and gymnastics; set a 5-foot, 9-inch high jump record; ran hurdles; boxed; played football; and was on the tug-of-war team. In 1889, he won the Wickstead gold medal, which made him an acknowledged gymnastic champion. McKenzie found his athletic abilities focused on sports that did not solely require strength or stamina, but rather skill, coordination, and practice. During his senior year at McGill, McKenzie was an intern at the University Hospital. He graduated from McGill University in 1892 Medicinæ Doctorem et Chirurgiæ Magistrum, and then got an internship at Montreal General Hospital.

After graduating, McKenzie gained experience as a physician and surgeon, developed his own medical practice and became an anatomy instructor at McGill. He became convinced of the need for preventive medicine. Training and conditioning of the body, he believed, would prevent disease, physical breakdown and accidents, so he developed a program of physical exercise.

In 1894, he became the personal family physician of the Governor General of Canada, the Marquis of Aberdeen. He spent 15 months in the Governor General's household, where he mingled with various political figures.

During the 1890s, McKenzie asked McGill to develop a department and school of physical education, but the university declined, citing lack of money. As a compromise, in 1898, McGill appointed him as Medical Director of Physical Training, the first such appointee at a Canadian university. He wanted to customize the athletic programs for three categories of student: athletic, sedentary, or bookworm, and the school allowed him to start physical examinations for incoming students.

Amid his duties at McGill and his medical practice in Montreal, McKenzie sought escape in art. He first turned to watercolour sketching, and always kept a small notebook in his pocket in which he would scribble whenever something caught his eye. His interest in sculpting was a result of his extensive knowledge of human anatomy, his desire to portraying athletics artistically, and the limitations of portraying musculature in two-dimensional art forms.

McKenzie's first untrained sculptural effort was a series of masks known as Violent Effort, Breathlessness, Fatigue and Exhaustion. To achieve these masks, he studied facial muscles under physical and emotional stress. His research led to an article, "The Facial Expression of Violent Effort, Breathlessness and Fatigue," published around 1900 in the Journal of Anatomy and Physiology in London.

His first sculptural piece in the round was The Sprinter. The design of the piece involved measurements of limbs and torsos of many athletes, including McGill students. The Sprinter was second in a series of over 200 works that included athletic figures, military figures, busts, masks, friezes and medallions. These works of art are displayed all over Canada, the United States, England and Scotland. His sculpture earned him membership in the Royal Canadian Academy of Arts.

=== University of Pennsylvania ===
In 1904, McKenzie took a position at the University of Pennsylvania in Philadelphia, which offered him a permanent faculty position and use of the university's a new gymnasium, football stadium, running track and other recently constructed facilities. His position as Director of the Physical Education Department came with the opportunity to develop, test and implement his theories on health and athletics.

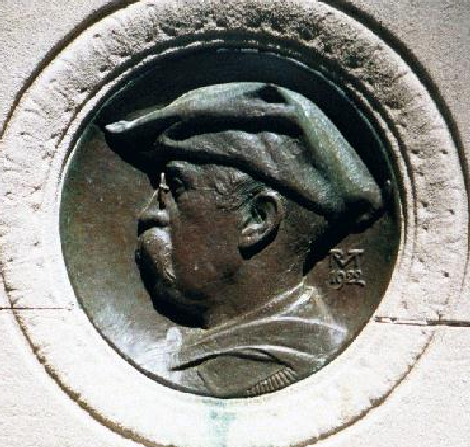
Relief bust of J. William White (1919), Rittenhouse Square, Philadelphia, Pennsylvania

While in Philadelphia, he also worked closely with Lord Robert Baden-Powell, founder of Scouting.

In 1907, McKenzie met and married musician and poet Ethel O'Neil, a native of Hamilton, Ontario, while on a voyage to England.

As a longtime supporter and spectator at the Olympic Games, McKenzie often exhibited works at the competition of fine arts. To commemorate the Olympic Games scheduled for 1912 Stockholm in, the American Olympic Committee commissioned him to create a sports medallion. The result was one of his most famous works, the Joy of Effort medallion. Within years, the YMCA started to use the motif in Asia. Later, at the 1932 Summer Olympics, McKenzie would win a medal for a sculpture.

In 1915, with the outbreak of the First World War, McKenzie made his way to England to enlist with the Canadian Forces. Eager to volunteer his services as a physician and surgeon, McKenzie chose instead to enlist with the Royal Army Medical Corps after encountering some red tape and delays in his paperwork. Given the commission of Lieutenant (and later becoming Major), they quickly assigned him to the physical training program for new soldiers. His first task was to inspect and report on the condition of the training camps. Once the organization of the training camps was completed, he spent six months working out of orthopedic care centers, with some of his work involving taking individuals disabled by war and designing specific prosthetic apparatus that would suit their needs. He also spent a large portion of his time helping plastic surgeon Dr. William L. Clark rehabilitate those whose faces had been disfigured by war.

After the war, McKenzie returned to his position at the University of Pennsylvania. In 1930, he left his post at the University as teaching there was no longer an enjoyable part of his life because of the bureaucracy that had become attached to his job.

=== Almonte ===
In McKenzie's final years, he was an internationally recognized figure and comparatively well off, so that he had the ability to retire anywhere. In 1931, he received an invitation from the Mayor of Almonte to return to his hometown to participate in the celebration of Almonte's 50th Anniversary of Incorporation. During the celebrations, the mayor offered McKenzie "The Freedom of Almonte" - a local award of recognition. While in town, he decided to explore his old boyhood haunts and came across the old gristmill known as Baird's Mill. The mayor encouraged McKenzie and his wife to purchase the property. The property had long since become abandoned; however, it was situated in a picturesque setting, making a perfect retirement home that would kindle McKenzie's artistic imagination. After Ethel O'Neil McKenzie's death in 1954, the Mill of Kintail, as McKenzie and his wife Ethel renamed the property, passed eventually into management by the local natural resource management office, the Mississippi Valley Conservation Authority, who open the museum to the public from May to October. During his retirement, McKenzie took advantage of the peaceful surroundings of Almonte. Being a man who could never sit still for very long, a typical summer's day would find him working in his studio, walking in the woods, swimming, canoeing, going into town or giving presentations to local groups. His spirit refused to allow him to slow down, despite warnings from his physician about his deteriorating heart, and consequently, McKenzie collapsed suddenly and died on April 28, 1938.

== Legacy ==
Medal record

Art competitions

Representing Canada

Olympic Games
Bronze medal – third place	1932 Los Angeles	Medals and reliefs

R. Tait McKenzie's influence was so strong in the fields of physical education, medicine, the arts, and the military that hundreds of people expressed sadness and felt personal loss in his passing, many sending condolences to his widow, Ethel.

His more than 200 works of art are seen around the world. A collection of his work can be seen at his former residence, the Mill of Kintail, also known as the R. Tait McKenzie Memorial Museum at the Mill of Kintail Conservation Area in Almonte. The Joseph B. Wolffe Collection of R. Tait McKenzie Sculpture of Athletes is housed on the campus of the University of Tennessee. Numerous sculptures can be seen in the public areas of the Inn at Penn in Philadelphia.

Near the end of his life, McKenzie said he wanted his heart to be buried in front of the Scottish-American War Memorial that he had created in Edinburgh, Scotland. When he died in Philadelphia, this request was denied by the "corporation of that city", but the organ was subsequently buried at the nearby St. Cuthbert churchyard.

An elementary school in Almonte was named after him in 1998.

Tait McKenzie Centre is a sports facility named after him at York University in Toronto, Canada.

== Honors and awards ==
Fellow #2 in the National Academy of Kinesiology

== Selected works ==
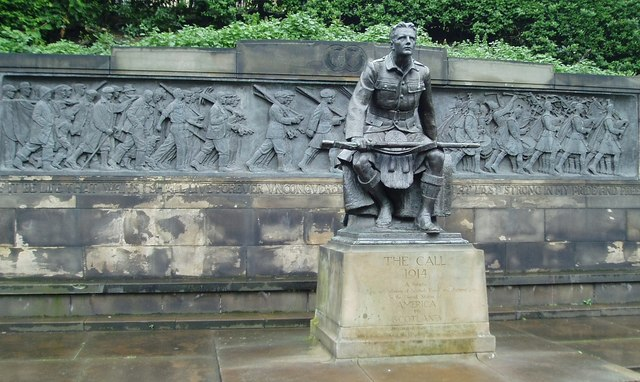
Scots American War Memorial (1927), Edinburgh, Scotland

- Benjamin Franklin in 1723 (1910–1914), University of Pennsylvania, Philadelphia, Pennsylvania. Duplicates are at the University of North Carolina, Chapel Hill; Philadelphia Free Library, Philadelphia, Pennsylvania; and Brookgreen Gardens, South Carolina.
- J. William White Memorial Drinking Fountain (1919–1921), Rittenhouse Square, Philadelphia, Pennsylvania.
- The Reverend George Whitefield (1914–1919), University of Pennsylvania, Philadelphia, Pennsylvania.
- The Homecoming (1922), Cambridge War Memorial, Hills Road, Cambridge, England.
- The Victor (1925), War Memorial, Woodbury, New Jersey.
- Edgar Fahs Smith (1925–26), University of Pennsylvania, Philadelphia.
- Scots American War Memorial (1927), Princes Street Gardens, Edinburgh, Scotland.
- General James Wolfe (1927), Greenwich Park, London, England.
- Bust of General John Grubb Parke (1930), Vicksburg National Military Park, Vicksburg, Mississippi.
- Bust of Governor Andrew G. Curtin (1930), Vicksburg National Military Park, Vicksburg, Mississippi.
- World Wars Monument (1932), Girard College, Philadelphia, Pennsylvania.
- Monument to Jane A. Delano and the Nurses Who Died in Service in World War I (1933), Red Cross Headquarters, Washington D.C.
- The Fields Medal (1933), awarded at the International Congress of Mathematicians.
- Three bronzes at Mercersburg Academy (1935), depicting the school's first headmaster William Mann Irvine, Rhodes scholar Robert Michelet, and Olympian Bill Carr.
- Rejoice Young Man in Thy Youth (1936), 13th issue of the Society of Medalists.
- Highlander Monument (1936), Darien, Georgia.
- The Ideal Scout (1937) also known as The Boy Scout.

=== Other Sculptures ===
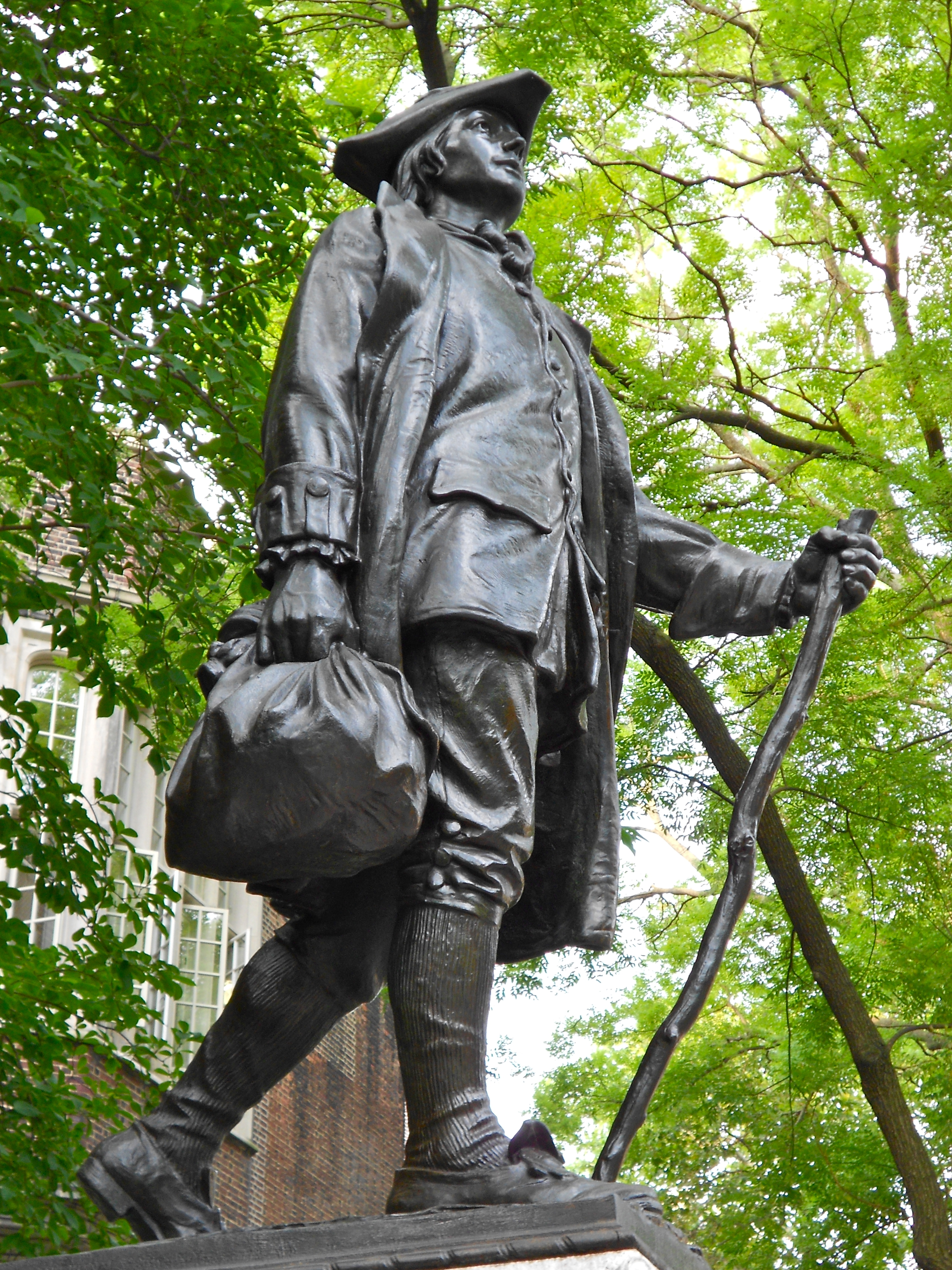
Benjamin Franklin in 1723 (1910–1914), University of Pennsylvania

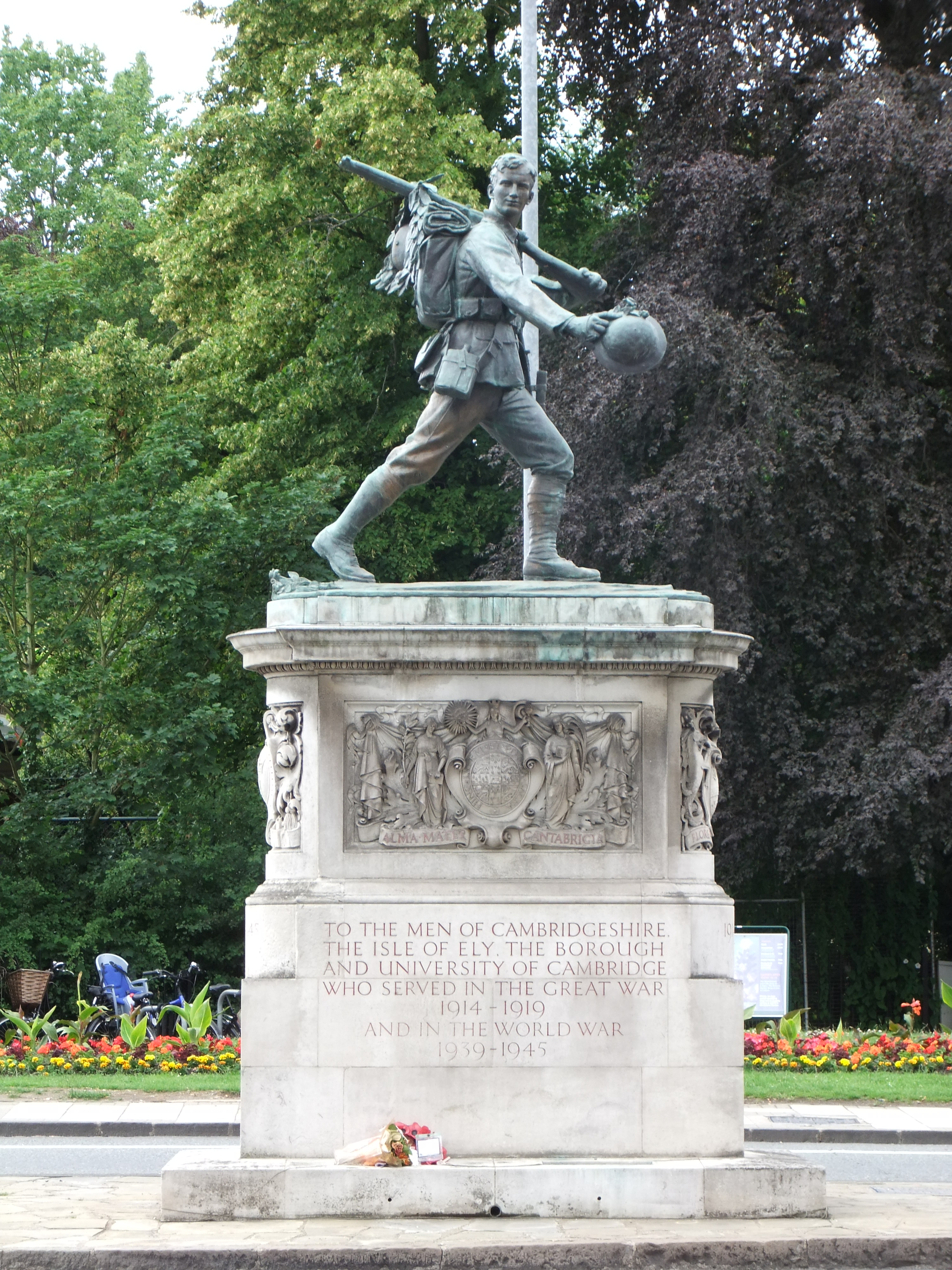
The Homecoming, Cambridge War Memorial, (1922), England

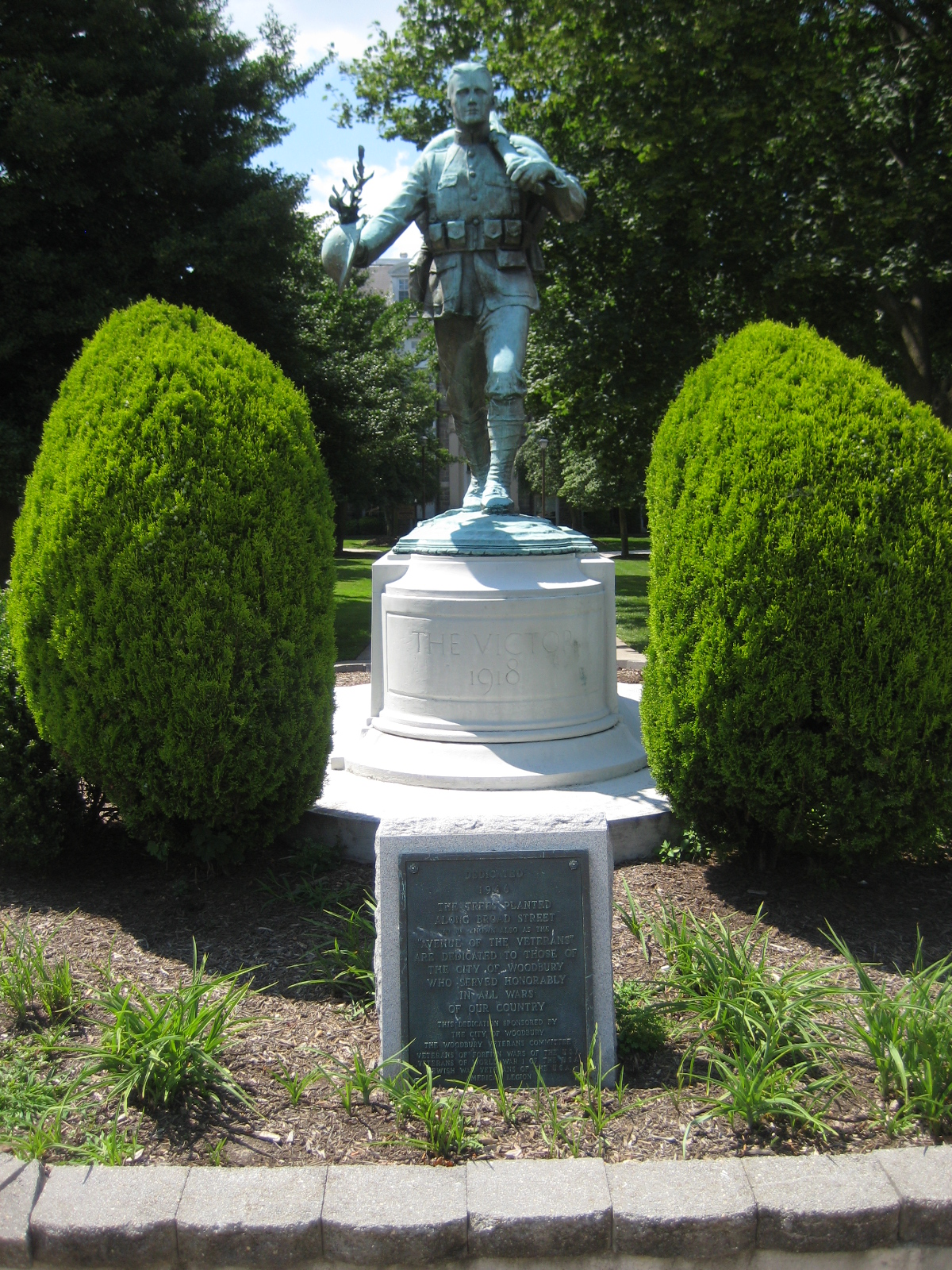
The Victor (1924), Woodbury, New Jersey

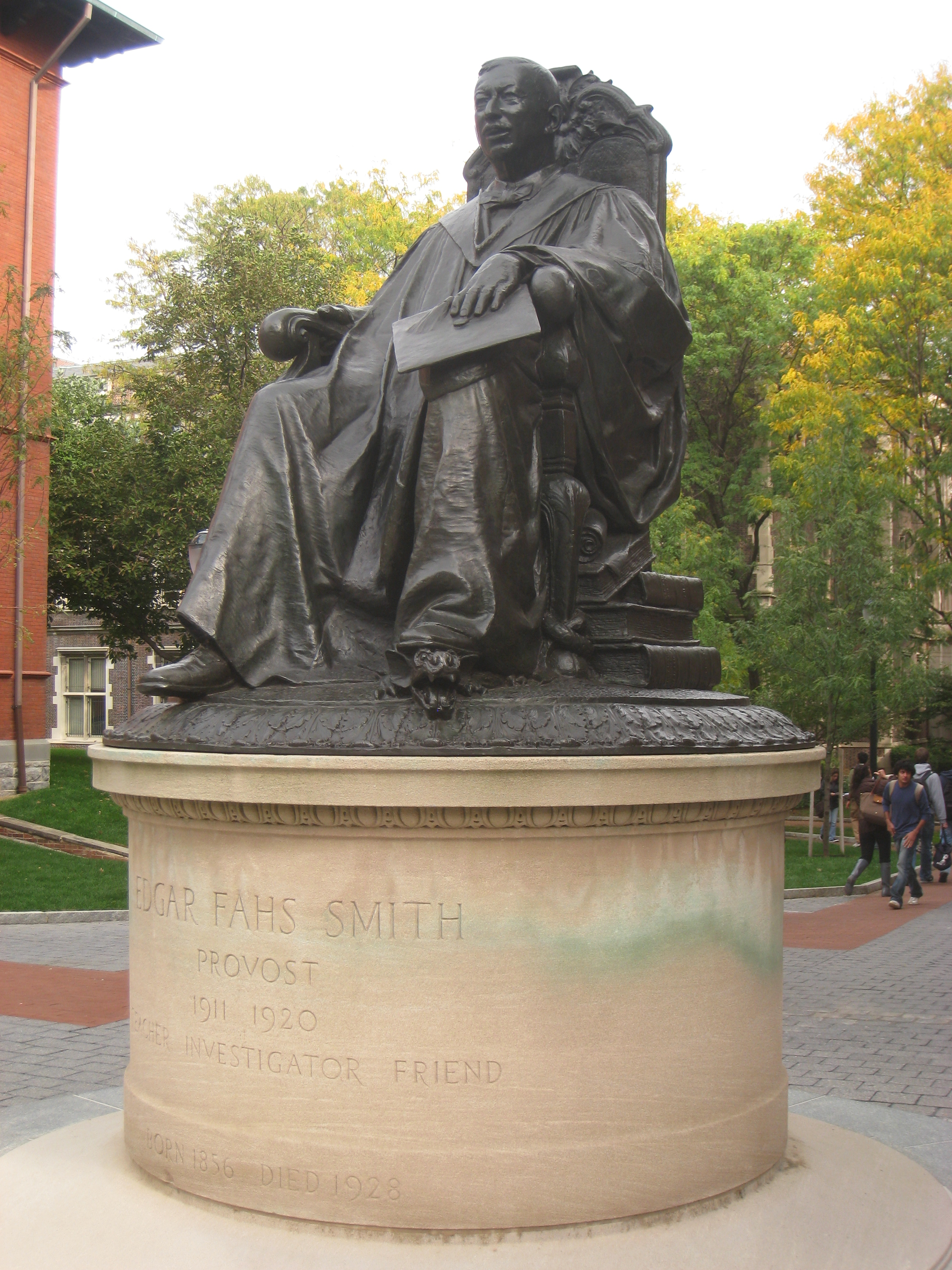
Edgar Fahs Smith (1925–26), University of Pennsylvania

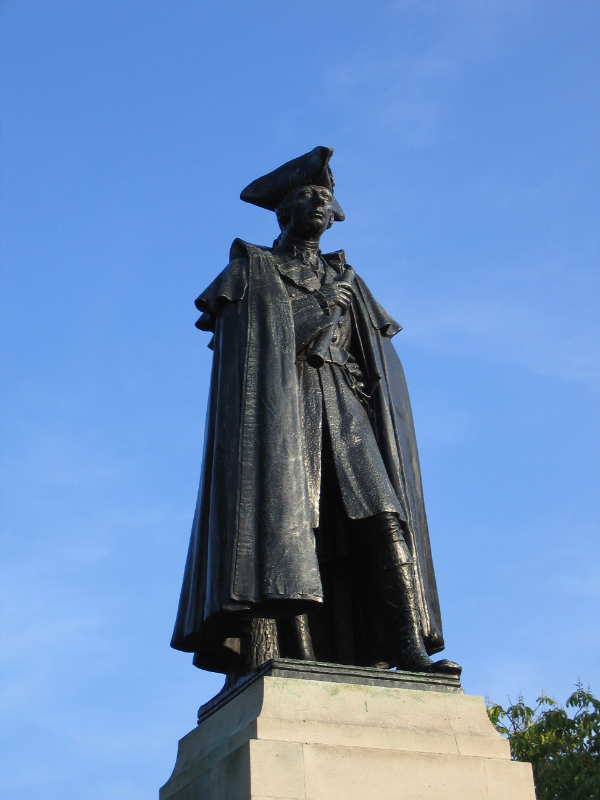
General James Wolfe (1927), Greenwich Park, London, England

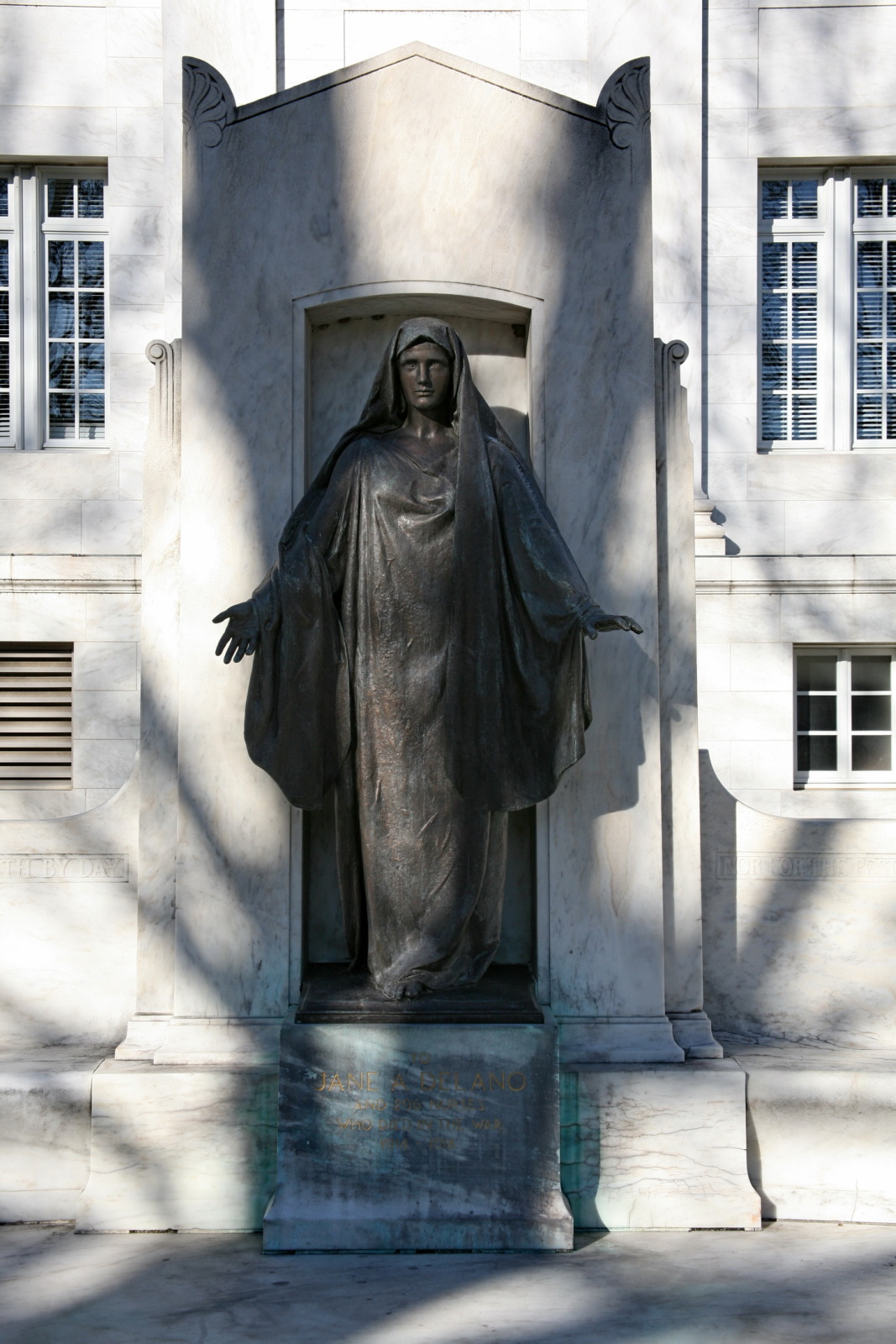
Jane Delano Monument (1933), Washington, DC
