= J. William White =

American surgeon

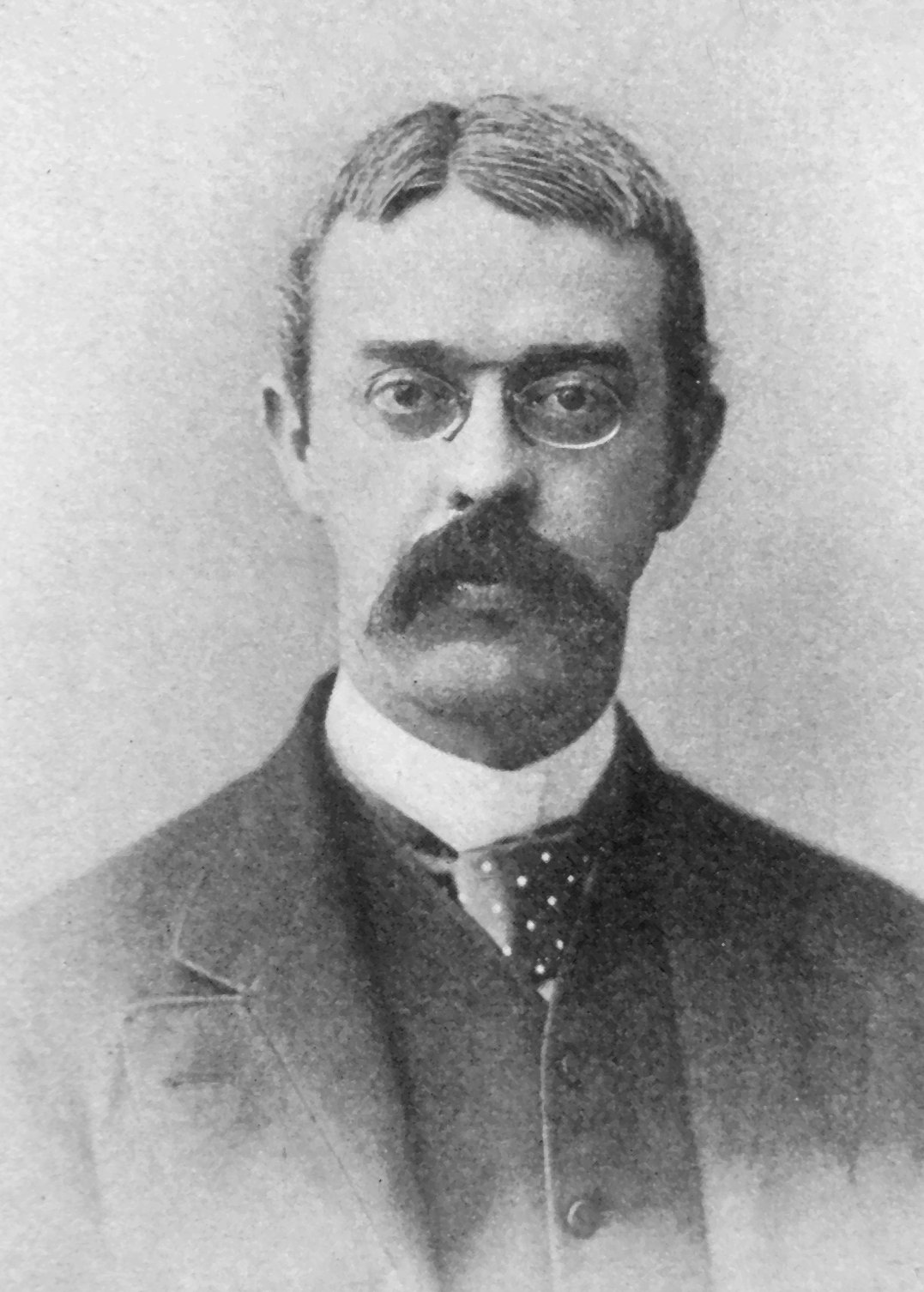
J. William White

James William White (November 2, 1850 – April 24, 1916) was an American surgeon from Philadelphia. After participating in the Hassler expedition to the West Indies, he became a respected surgeon, teacher and author at the University of Pennsylvania Hospital, with which he was associated from 1874 to 1916. He was John Rhea Barton Professor of Surgery at the University of Pennsylvania Hospital from 1900 to 1912 and professor emeritus until his death.

== Early life and education ==
J. William White was born in Philadelphia, a son of Dr. James W. White and his wife Mary Ann McClaranan. Dr. James W. White was for many years president of the Board of Charities and Correction, founder of the Maternity Hospital in Philadelphia, and first president of the S. S. White Dental Manufacturing Company.

After completing courses of study in the public schools and Friends' School, J. William White entered the Medical Department of the University of Pennsylvania, whence he was graduated Doctor of Medicine, class of 1871, receiving from the university the degree of Doctor of Philosophy the same year.

== Career ==
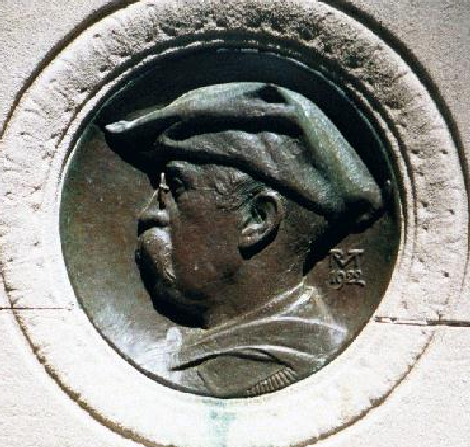
White – 1922, bas-relief bust by R. Tait McKenzie, Rittenhouse Square

Shortly after graduation he became a member of the staff gathered by Professor Louis Agassiz for the Hassler expedition to the West Indies, the Straits of Magellan and both coasts of South America. After his return to Philadelphia he began practice, became eminent as a surgeon, and during his entire after life was a teacher and writer in surgery. He joined the University of Pennsylvania Medical School in 1874. His connection with the university as professor emeritus ended only with his death.

White was the author of the "Human Anatomy" (1875); American Text Book of Surgery (1896); Genito-Urinary Surgery (1897); and an editor of Annals of Surgery. He was a member of the American Surgical Association, the American Genito-Urinary Association, a fellow of the College of Physicians of Philadelphia, and a trustee of the University of Pennsylvania.

During World War I, Dr. White served at the American Hospital in Paris, as part of a unit from the University of Pennsylvania Medical School. He also published A Primer of the War for Americans (1914), later enlarged and republished as A Textbook of the War for Americans (1915).

== Personal life ==
White was an avid sportsman. He was a member of the Rittenhouse, Corinthian Yacht, Philadelphia Country and The Franklin Inn Club of Philadelphia. He was also a member of the Reform, the Royal Automobile and the Kinsman clubs, all of London, and of the Swiss and American Alpine Club. Once, in September 1880, he swam from Newport to the Narragansett Pier, Rhode Island, making ten miles in five hours and forty minutes in a cold rough sea.

The Army and Navy football teams had faced each other four times between 1890 and 1893, alternating between the two academy campuses. The series was discontinued after 1893 following objections by the academy superintendents. Through the efforts and diplomacy of Dr. White, the academies agreed to resume the series in 1899 at the University of Pennsylvania's Franklin Field beginning a long tradition of the game being played in Philadelphia.

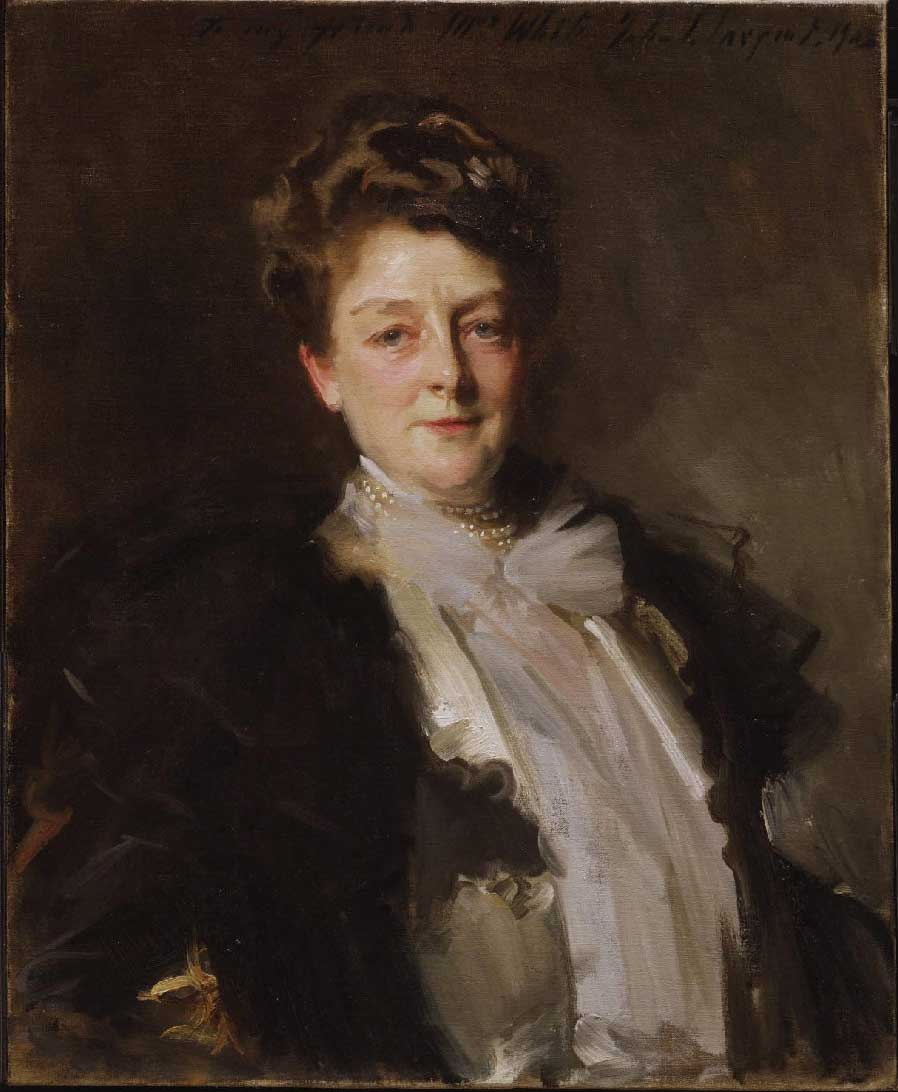
Mrs. J. William White, John Singer Sargent, 1903

On June 22, 1888, in Milford, Connecticut, he married Miss Letitia Brown, who survived him.

== Death ==
After his death, his brain was donated to the American Anthropometric Society. An analysis of the society's brain collection in 1907 by Edward Anthony Spitzka showed that White's brain had suffered damage during the storage process and could not be analyzed.
