= James Guinness Rogers =

James Guinness Rogers (29 December 1822 – 20 August 1911), was a British Nonconformist clergyman.

== Education ==
Rogers was born at Enniskillen, Ireland in 1822, where his Cornish-born father Thomas Rogers (1796–1854) was an Irish Evangelical Society preacher. He was educated at Silcoates School, Wakefield, and at Trinity College, Dublin, where he was friendly with William Digby Seymour.

== Ministry ==
After graduating B.A. in 1843 he entered the Lancashire Independent College, Manchester, where he had as contemporaries Robert Alfred Vaughan and Enoch Mellor; the latter appears to have influenced him most. Leaving in 1845, he was ordained on 15 April 1846, and became minister of St. James's chapel, Newcastle-on-Tyne, where he had to combat the rationalistic spirit engendered by Joseph Barker and came under the spell of Edward Miall. In 1851 he became pastor of Albion Chapel, Ashton-under-Lyne, outside Manchester, where he arranged the building of new school premises.

In 1857 charges of heresy were brought against Samuel Davidson, who as one of his tutors had taken part in the ordination of Rogers. The main point was an alleged impugning of the Mosaic authorship of the Pentateuch. Nothing contributed more to the expulsion of Davidson from his chair in the Lancashire Independent College than a bitter anonymous pamphlet, "Dr. Davidson: His Heresies, Contradictions, and Plagiarisms. By Two Graduates" [Enoch Mellor and Rogers]. Long after, Rogers wrote of Davidson: The controversies of later years separated us, but they never led me to forget or underrate the benefit I derived from his patient, painstaking, and most valuable labours; this contradicts the tone of the, pamphlet, but Rogers was a man who mellowed in many respects as time went on. In 1865 he was chairman of the Lancashire Congregational Union; in the same year he moved to the pastorate of Clapham (Gratton Square) congregational church. Here he ministered till 1900.

== Political influence ==
His denomination honoured him by making him chairman of the Surrey Congregational Union (1868); of the London Congregational Union; and of the Congregational Union of England and Wales (1874; now the United Reformed Church). His influence extended, and he came to be regarded as the representative of sober yet convinced nonconformity, and was trusted as such by leading authorities in church and state. He is best remembered for his close association with Dr. Robert William Dale in the Liberal and Nonconformist education and disestablishment campaigns of 1865–75, that resulted in the Irish Church Act 1869; and for his friendship with Gladstone and Lord Rosebery, who consulted him as the foremost representative of Nonconformist political opinion.

== Retirement ==
He retired in 1900 and was given an illuminated address and a purse containing £1100, the equivalent of £173,000 in 2023.

He wrote his autobiography in 1903 and died at Clapham in 1911. One of his grandsons was the war poet E. A. Mackintosh (1893–1917); see also High Wood).
