= Fanny Rysan Mulford Hitchcock =

American chemist, vertebrate palaeontologist, biologist and philanthropist

Fanny Rysan Mulford Hitchcock FAAAS
- Born: February 7, 1851
- Died: September 25, 1936 (aged 85)
- Known for: One of only 13 women to receive their doctorates in chemistry in the 1800s
- Scientific career
- Fields: Chemistry, paleontology, osteology, ichthyology
- Workplaces: University of Pennsylvania University of Berlin
- Thesis: Tungstates and Molybdates of the Rare Earths (1894)

Fanny Rysan Mulford Hitchcock (February 7, 1851 – September 25, 1936) was one of only 13 American women to receive their doctorates in chemistry during the 19th-century, and was the first woman to receive a doctorate in Philosophy of Chemistry from the University of Pennsylvania.

She made contributions to entomology, fish osteology, and plant pathology. She began her studies at Columbia University publishing several papers, and then transferred to the University of Pennsylvania. She worked at the University of Pennsylvania for years, and devoted her life to helping women pursuing an education at the university. Her name can be found spelled as Fannie, Rysam, and any combination of all spellings. She can also be found as Miss Fanny R.M. Hitchcock, or Miss F.R.M. Hitchcock, not to be confused with Irish Reverend and writer F.R.M Hitchcock.

== Life ==
She was born on February 7, 1851, to Elizabeth and Julius Hitchcock. Before enrolling with any American university she was undertaking research in vertebrate paleontology, amongst other topics. She presented her paper on Edestus fossils to the American Association for the Advancement of Science in 1887. She began her university studies at Columbia University, and then transferred to the University of Pennsylvania. While the University of Columbia was not accepting female students at the time of her first publications, she had offered the board of trustees at Barnard College, the women's college, to help raise funds for a laboratory for the following year, when women would be able to begin attending the university. In pursuit of science, she then worked in the chemistry department at the University of Berlin in 1892, though she applied for a passport in 1894. She received her Ph. D. at the University of Pennsylvania with her thesis on “The Tungstates and Molybdates of the Rare Earths”; her doctoral advisor was Edgar Fahs Smith.

She returned to the University of Pennsylvania and became the first director of the women's graduate department in 1897. She also attempted to establish one or more undergraduate courses for women at the University of Pennsylvania, but her proposal was rejected by the trustees of the University, which made her step down from her position of director in 1901. No successor of this position was named. In 1921, she retired from her life as a chemist at seventy years old and donated all of her equipment to the University of Pennsylvania in the case of a women's fund or women's college getting formed. She moved to Warwick, New York in 1923. Aside from her academic studies, she maintained a laboratory in both her home in Philadelphia and her country residence in Warwick. She was known to support the financial needs of students who could not afford to attend the University, and even rented a gym for the women to use while she was director at Pennsylvania. She died on September 25, 1936, in her Warwick country residence.

After obtaining her Ph.D. in chemistry in 1894 from the University of Pennsylvania, she began experimenting more with metals. She bought a mountain to have access to Uranium, known as "Taylor Hill" in Bellvale. This was also the location of Mistucky Brook. Miss Hitchcock entered a legal covenant with the city of Warwick which prohibited using land within a certain range of the brook for constructing buildings to reduce pollution, which resulted in a lawsuit in 1989. In 1909, she began working on her patent for “Food Compound for Promoting the Rapid Growth of Poultry”, which was finalized in 1913. In 1914 she wrote to a George H. Earle Jr. over World War I from London, and opinions on submarines in 1914. Mr. Earle then wrote to a judge with her information in 1917. She was declared incompetent in 1932, and was also in multiple lawsuits (one in 1933 and another in 1934) at the end of her life, regarding property and payments. She died on September 25, 1936.

Throughout her life, she joined many different scientific communities. While at the University of Pennsylvania, she was one of the first women to ever join the fraternity Kappa Kappa Gamma. She also joined the Sigma Xi Society, and was still a contributing member in 1925. Beta Alpha was the third university organization that she joined, where she created the first philanthropy, an annual prize of a table, accepted by the fraternity. This later developed into the Student Aid Fund. She joined the New York Academy of Sciences in 1881 and eventually became a fellow, and was also a fellow in the American Association for the Advancement of Science. In 1888, she conducted the 15th meeting of the New York Mineralogist Club in her house. She became a member of the American Mathematical Society in 1894 (and was a member until 1910), which was also known as Project Euclid and the New York Mathematical Society. She also joined the American Electrochemical Society, the American Chemical Society, the American Physical Society, the American Institute of Mining, Metallurgy, and Petroleum Engineers (joining in 1920), and the Franklin Institute.

== Scientific contributions and articles ==
"The Tungstates and Molybdates of the Rare Earths" (1895)

"XI.—Further Notes on the Osteology of the Shad, (Alosa sapidissima)" (1889)

"Introductory Note on the Reduction of Metallic Oxides, At High Temperatures" (1898)

"Notes on the Atomic Mass of Tungsten" (1898)

The following articles can be found by name only, with no accompanying research.

- "Occurrence of Early Stages of Blepharocera" (1886)
- "Preliminary Paper on Structure of Alosa Sapidissima" (1887)
- "On the Homologies of Edestus" (1887)
- "Preliminary Notes on the Osteology of Alosa Sapidissima" (1887)
- "Notes on the Larvae of Ambylstoma" (also known as "Karyokinesis in Larval Amblystoma") (1888)
- "Petrological Microscope, with Various Accessories, Designed by Fuess of Berlin" (1897)
- "Some Substances found in Uranium Compounds and in Iron Ores of Orange County, N.Y." (1912)
- "Beta Rays and the Chemical Elements" (1915)
- "Some Undescribed Disintegration Products of Radioactive Elements" (1917)
- "The Effect of Lead Upon Thorium Nitrate in Aqueous Solution" (1919)
