= Edgar Fahs Smith =

American chemist (1854–1928)

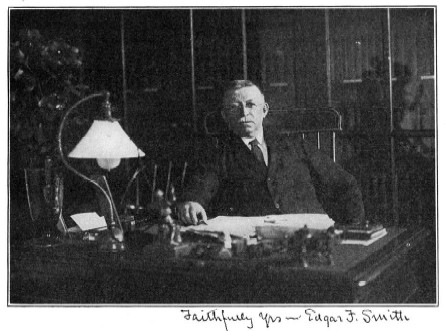

Edgar Fahs Smith (May 23, 1854 – May 3, 1928) was an American scientist who is best known today for his interests in the history of chemistry. He served as provost of the University of Pennsylvania from 1911 to 1920, was deeply involved in the American Chemical Society and other organizations, and was awarded the Priestley Medal in 1926.

He accumulated a large collection of pictures, books, and papers related to the history of chemistry, which today forms the nucleus of the Edgar Fahs Smith Memorial Collection at the University of Pennsylvania. The collection was designated as a National Historic Chemical Landmark on March 16, 2000.

== Life and work ==
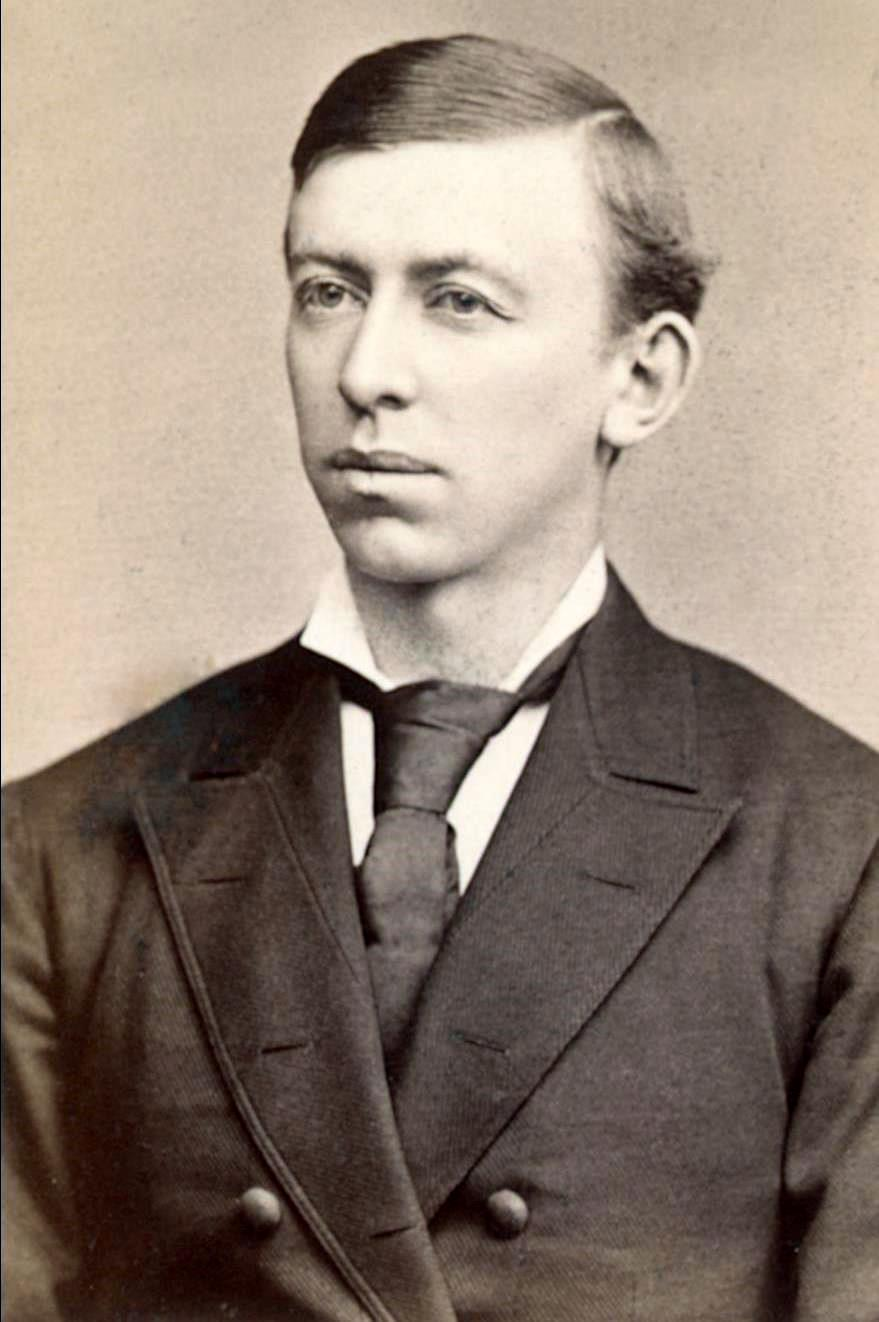
Smith in 1878

Edgar Fahs Smith was born in York, Pennsylvania on May 23, 1854, to Gibson Smith and Elizabeth Fahs (Smith). He was raised in the Moravian faith. His younger brother Allen John Smith was born in 1863. He attended York County Academy, a college preparatory school, from 1867 to 1872.

Smith had planned to attend Yale University, but changed to Pennsylvania College at Gettysburg (now Gettysburg College) when he was given the opportunity to enter as a junior in 1872, due to his advanced knowledge and education. He majored in chemistry and mineralogy with Samuel Philip Sadtler. Smith earned his college degree from Pennsylvania College in 1874. He received his Ph.D. under Friedrich Wöhler at the University of Göttingen in 1876. Smith then returned to the United States and married Margie Alice Gruel in 1876.

In 1876, Fahs was appointed Associate Professor of Analytical Chemistry at the University of Pennsylvania, where he taught for five years. He then took two short-term appointments in Allentown, Pennsylvania and Springfield, Ohio. He returned to the University of Pennsylvania as Professor of Analytical Chemistry in 1888, and succeeded Sadtler as head of the chemistry department in 1892. He was the doctoral advisor of the first woman to receive a doctorate in Philosophy of Chemistry at the University of Pennsylvania, Fanny R. M. Hitchcock. He also became director of the John Harrison Laboratory, which was created at the University of Pennsylvania in 1894. He was associated with the University as a professor of chemistry (1888-1911), as vice-provost (1899-1911) and then as provost (1911-1920). Smith was an active advocate for the education of women, accepting and mentoring women students, and working to open both graduate and undergraduate programs to women. He was also the founder of the Pennsylvania Iota chapter of the Phi Kappa Psi fraternity at Penn. He retired from the university in 1920.

Edgar Fahs Smith used what he called "historical chemistry" in his work as a teacher, to remind chemistry students of the humanistic side of science and to counter what he saw as an overly commercial approach to scientific training. He chose to emphasize the moral aspects of their work, rather than focusing solely on the development of skilled technicians. He also wrote extensively on the history of chemistry.

Smith's scientific research focused on the fields of electrochemistry, the determination of atomic weights, and research on rare earth elements. Smith was a pioneer in the field of electrochemistry, discovering the use of electric current for the separation of metals and minerals, and published a number of works on chemistry. His research with metals centered on tungsten, which has a wide variety of industrial uses.

Smith was a co-founder of the American Chemical Society's History of Chemistry division. He served three times as president of the American Chemical Society and was president of the American Philosophical Society (1902–1908) and the History of Science Society (1928). In 1898 Smith was elected to the National Academy of Sciences. Smith desired for the ACS's History division to establish a Journal for Historical Chemistry and attempted to seek funding from William H. Nichols to establish it, but never succeeded; the History Division eventually did establish its own journal in 1988, titled Bulletin for the History of Chemistry.

He was awarded the Priestley Medal in 1926.

Smith died in Philadelphia, Pennsylvania on May 3, 1928.

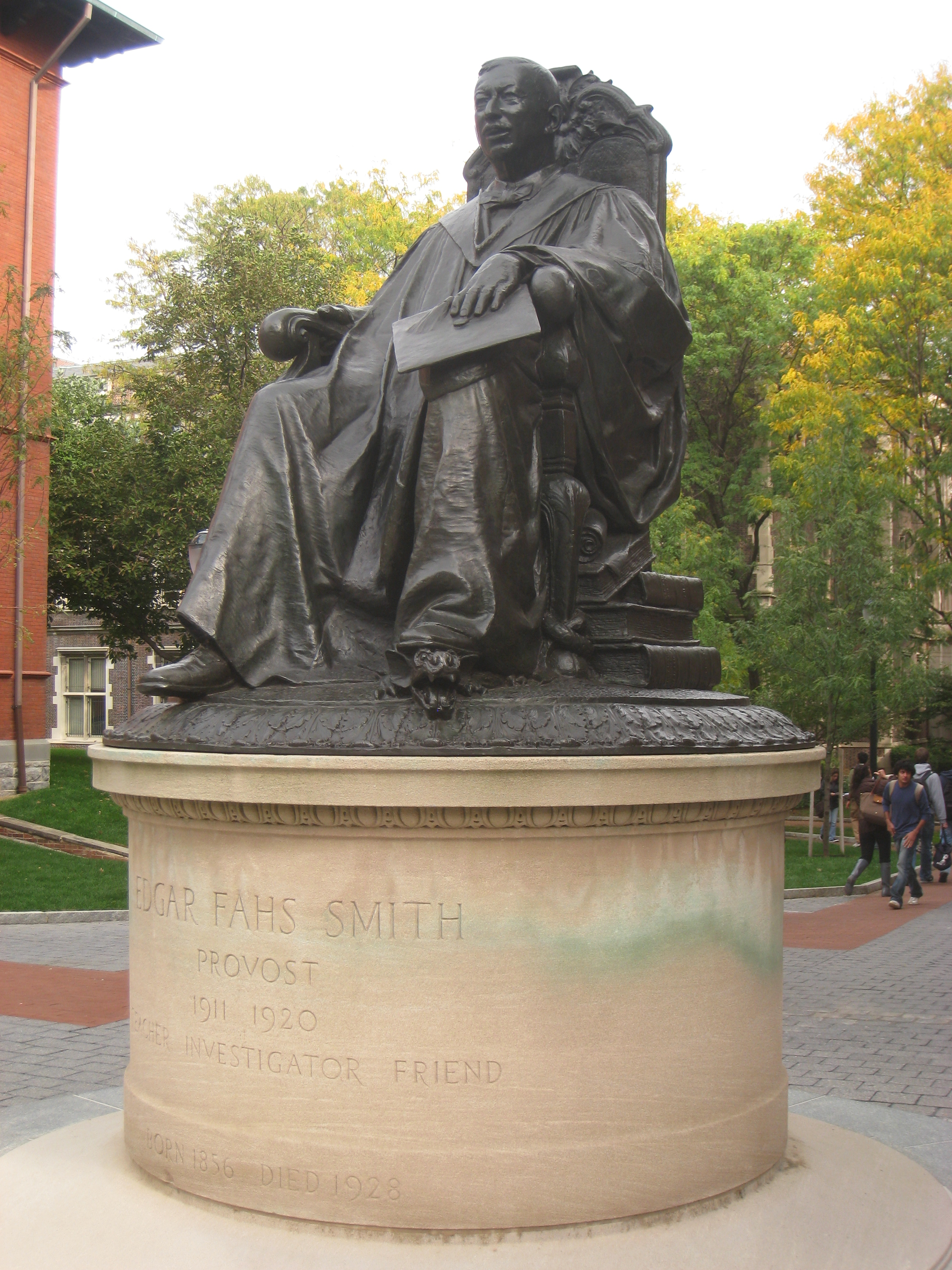
Statue of Edgar Fahs Smith on the campus of the University of Pennsylvania

A statue of Edgar Fahs Smith, built in 1925, now stands on the University of Pennsylvania campus, on the eponymous "Smith Walk" near 34th Street, next to the Vagelos Laboratories. According to an article published in the university's online journal, Penn Today, "The devilish figure under Smith's left shoe is meant to represent 'error', which Smith is stamping out through science."

In York, Pennsylvania, there was a middle school named after him above the York Fairgrounds located at 701 Texas Avenue called "Edgar Fahs Middle School". This school closed in 2010 but re-opened in 2017 as a STEAM Academy, incorporating science, technology, engineering, art, and mathematics into project based learning.

== Memorial collection ==
During his lifetime, Smith accumulated an international collection of approximately 3,000 printed books and 600 manuscripts, along with antique furniture, portraits of chemists and other memorabilia. After his death, his widow, Marjie A. Smith, donated his collection, with an endowment, to the University of Pennsylvania. The Edgar Fahs Smith Memorial Collection in the History of Chemistry (Smith Memorial Collection) opened on March 1, 1931, and was initially curated by Smith's former secretary, Eva Armstrong. Since its creation, the collection has grown to 15,000 books, manuscripts and pamphlets dealing with the history of chemistry and related sciences and technologies. The collection was designated as a National Historic Chemical Landmark on March 16, 2000. The Catalog of the Edgar Fahs Smith Memorial Collection in the History of Chemistry was published by G. K. Hall in 1960.

== Published books ==
- Electro-Chemical Analysis (1890; revised 1894, 1902, 1918)
- Chemistry of the Carbon Compounds (2 vols., 3d ed. 1900)
- Experiments Arranged for Students in General Chemistry (with H. F. Keller, 4th ed. 1900)
- Theories of Chemistry (1913)
- Chemistry in America (1914)
- Atomic Weights (1915)
- The Life of Robert Hare (1917)
- James Woodhouse, a pioneer in chemistry, 1770-1809 (1918) At archive.org.
- Chemistry in Old Philadelphia (1918)
- James Cutbush (1919)
- Priestley in America (1920)

He translated Victor von Richter's A Text-book of Inorganic Chemistry (3d ed., 1900).
