= Eva Armstrong =

American secretary, librarian, curator and historian of science

Eva Vivian Armstrong
- Born: Eva Vivian Armstrong; December 22, 1877; Key West, Florida, U.S.
- Died: May 10, 1962 (aged 84)
- Occupations: Librarian, curator, historian of science
- Awards: Dexter Award (1958)

Eva Vivian Armstrong (December 22, 1877 – May 10, 1962) was an American secretary, librarian, curator, and historian of science. She was the original curator of the Edgar Fahs Smith Memorial Collection in the History of Chemistry at the University of Pennsylvania. The collection, which opened on March 1, 1931, was designated a National Historic Chemical Landmark on March 16, 2000.

Armstrong also helped to establish the journal Chymia, working as secretary of the board of editors of the journal for the history of chemistry from 1948 to 1953. She published on the history of chemistry in journals including Chymia, Isis, and the Journal of Chemical Education. Armstrong received the Dexter Award for contributions to the history of chemistry in 1958.

== Education ==
Eva Vivian Armstrong was born on December 22, 1877, in Key West, Florida. Armstrong attended Atlantic City High School and was then a secretary, first at the Book Lover's Agency and then at the University of Pennsylvania beginning in 1906.

== Edgar Fahs Smith ==
From 1909-1920 Armstrong was secretary of the board for the chemistry faculty at the University of Pennsylvania, chaired by Edgar Fahs Smith. She became Edgar Fahs Smith's personal secretary when he retired in 1920. She helped to develop and catalog his extensive chemistry history collection of more than 13,000 objects.

After Smith died in 1928, his widow Margie A.Smith bequeathed the collection to the University of Pennsylvania and appointed Eva Armstrong as curator, a position in which she remained from 1929 until her retirement in 1949. Under her guidance, the collection expanded from approximately 600 manuscripts, 1800 prints and 3,000 volumes to 1,400 manuscripts, 3,400 prints, and 7,700 volumes. Both the collection and the knowledge of its archivist were important resources for scientists and scholars worldwide, who sought her out both as visitors and as correspondents.

== Chymia ==
Armstrong was a founder of Chymia, a journal on the history of chemistry. She worked with Charles Albert Browne (1870–1947), who died before the first issue appeared, and Tenney L. Davis (1890–1949), who served as editor-in-chief of the first two issues. From the journal's foundation in 1948 to 1953, Armstrong was secretary of the Board of Editors. In addition to serving on the board of Chymia, she published articles on the history of chemistry in Chymia the Journal of Chemical Education, Isis, the General Magazine and Historical Chronicle, the Library Chronicle, the Scientific Monthly, and other journals.

== Awards ==
In 1958 Armstrong received the Dexter Award. "Miss Armstrong was chosen not for activity in a single field, but rather for the stimulation, inspiration and assistance that she contributed to the history of chemistry over a long period of years." The memorial plaque was inscribed, "To Miss Armstrong for her noteworthy contributions to the advancement of the History of Chemistry.

== Selected publications ==
- Armstrong, Eva V. (1933). "Some Treasures in the E. F. Smith Collection". General Magazine and Historical Chronicle. 25: 3–12.
- Armstrong, Eva V. (1933). "Some Incidents in the Collection of the E. F. Smith Memorial Library". Journal of Chemical Education. 10: 356–358. doi:10.1021/ed010p356.
- Armstrong, Eva V. (1936). "Playground of a Scientist". The Scientific Monthly. 42 (4): 339–348. Bibcode:1936SciMo..42..339A. JSTOR 16089.
- Armstrong, Eva V. (1937). The story of the Edgar Fahs Smith memorial collection in the history of chemistry. Philadelphia: University of Pennsylvania.
- Armstrong, Eva V. (February 1938). "Jane Marcet and her "Conversations on Chemistry"". Journal of Chemical Education. 15 (2): 53. Bibcode:1938JChEd..15...53A. doi:10.1021/ed015p53.
- Armstrong, Eva V.; Lukens, Hiram S. (January 1939). "Lazarus Ercker and his Probierbuch. Sir John Pettus and his Fleta Minor". Journal of Chemical Education. 16 (1): 553–562. Bibcode:1939JChEd..16..553A. doi:10.1021/ed016p553.
- Armstrong, Eva V.; Deischer, Claude K. (January 1942). "Johann Rudolph Glauber (1604-70). His chemical and human philosophy". Journal of Chemical Education. 19 (1): 3. Bibcode:1942JChEd..19....3A. doi:10.1021/ed019p3.
- Armstrong, Eva V. (1947). "Dr. Henry Moyes, Scotch chemist". Journal of Chemical Education. 24 (4): 169–. Bibcode:1947JChEd..24..169A. doi:10.1021/ed024p169.
- Edgar F. Smith Memorial Collection; Armstrong, Eva; Smith, Edgar F. (1960). Catalog of the Edgar Fahs Smith memorial collection in the history of chemistry. Boston: G. K. Hall.
