= Scottish American Memorial =

World War I memorial in Edinburgh, Scotland

Coordinates: 55°57′02″N 3°12′07″W

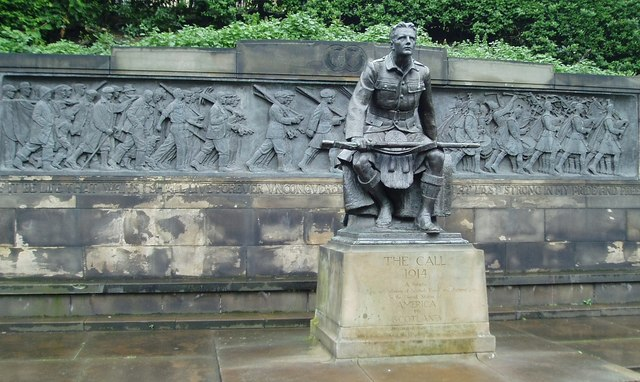
R. Tait McKenzie's Scots American War Memorial (1927), Edinburgh, Scotland.

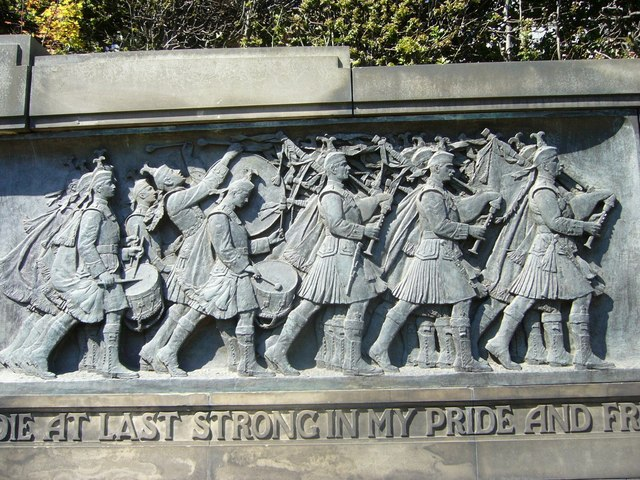
R. Tait McKenzie's Scots American War Memorial (1927), Edinburgh, Scotland has a line by Ewart Alan Mackintosh on the frieze at the back.

The Scottish American Memorial, or Scots American War Memorial, is in West Princes Street Gardens in Edinburgh. It was called "The Call 1914", and it was erected in 1927 and shows a kilted infantryman looking towards Castle Rock. Behind the main statue is a frieze showing queues of men answering the call by following a kilted pipe band. The memorial was given by Scottish-Americans to honour Scots who had served in the first World War.

It is designated a Category B listed building by Historic Scotland.

== History ==
The memorial was paid for by The Scottish – American War Memorial Committee representing Scottish-Americans as a tribute to the bravery of Scottish troops during World War I. The Scottish National War Memorial (with similar design relating to the military in the Shrine) having been opened in July of that same year it was evidently relatedly unveiled on 7 September 1927 by the United States Ambassador to the United Kingdom, Alanson B Houghton, with the Mackintosh's text reading "if it be life that waits, I shall live forever unconquered. If death, I shall die at last, strong in my pride and free" and with on the contemporary postcard the title "Spirit of 1914".

"The Call 1914" (as actually named within the memorial) was designed by R. Tait McKenzie who was a Scottish Canadian working at the time at the University of Pennsylvania in Philadelphia. McKenzie only took to sculpture in later life having started his interests in physical education. His sculpture invariably was of life size male athletic figures. This work took him four years to complete. The bronze backdrop frieze shows Scots of differing professions answering the call and changing from civilians into marching soldiers. It was also by McKenzie, but the architect Reginald Fairlie was also involved. The stonework is constructed from Craigleith sandstone. At the very top of the design are the two intertwined escutcheons of America and Scotland. The memorial was said to have cost ten thousand pounds at the time it was built.

At the bottom of the frieze are lines from E. A. Mackintosh's poem "A Creed": "If it be life that waits I shall live forever unconquered; if death I shall die at last strong in my pride and free." Mackintosh was a 23-year-old ex-Oxford Classics student of Scottish descent who was killed at the second Battle of Cambrai in 1917.

When R Tait McKenzie died he hoped to have his heart buried beneath this memorial, and this presumably either because he considered this his best work or also perhaps on account of a belief in its general significance in relation to First World War memorials in general and in particular perhaps the directly related Scottish National War Memorial.
