= Ewart Alan Mackintosh =

Scottish poet (1893–1917)

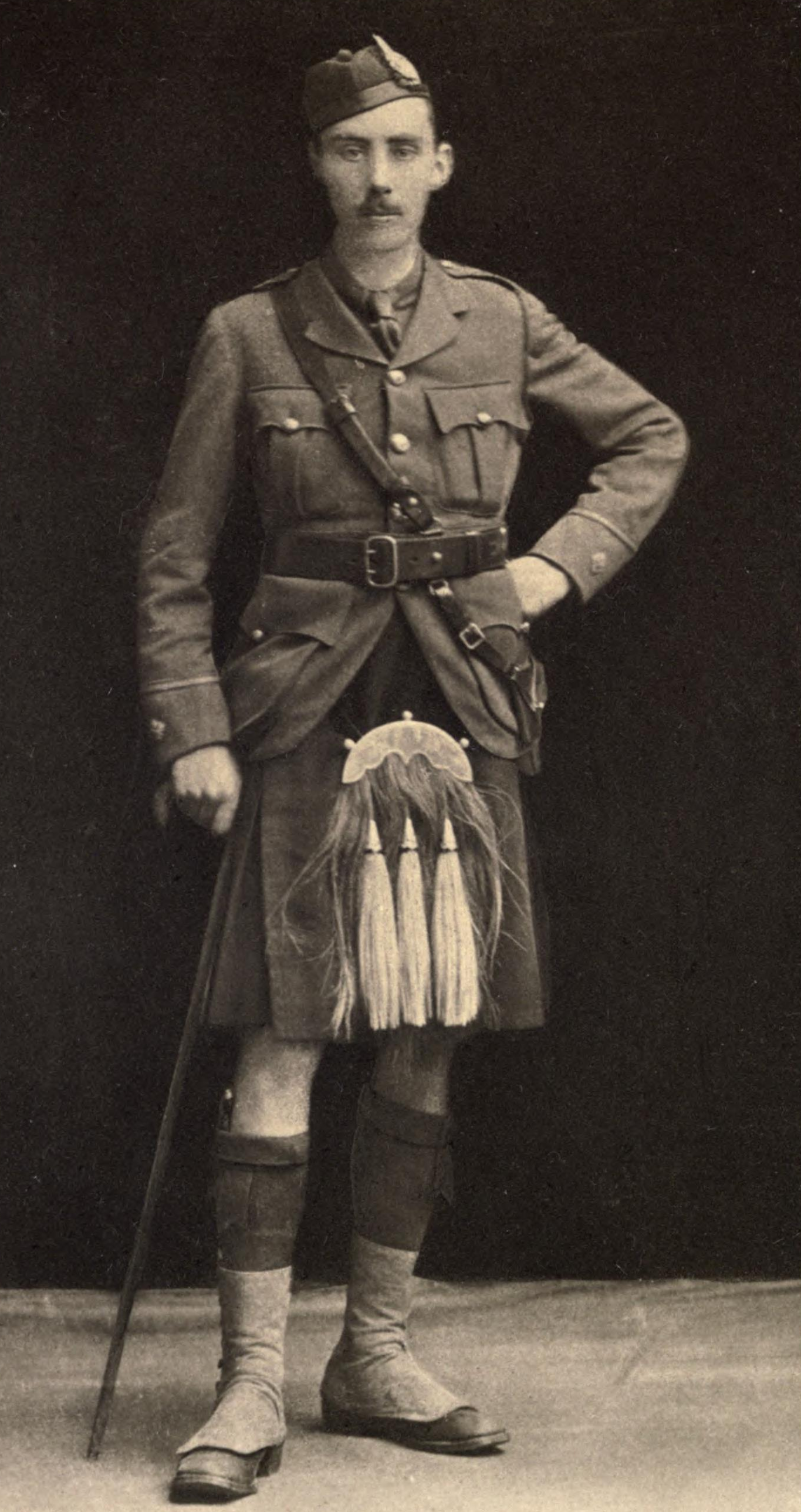
Ewart Alan Mackintosh

Lieutenant Ewart Alan Mackintosh MC (4 March 1893 – 21 November 1917) was a war poet and an officer in the Seaforth Highlanders from December 1914. Mackintosh was killed whilst observing the second day of the second Battle of Cambrai, 21 November 1917. His best poetry has been said to be comparable in quality to that of Rupert Brooke.

== Life ==
Ewart Alan Mackintosh was born on 4 March 1893, the only son of Alexander Mackintosh and his wife, Lilian Rogers. Although he was born in Brighton in Sussex, his father's roots went back to Clan Mackintosh in Alness in Ross. His maternal grandfather was the Calvinist preacher James Guinness Rogers. He said that it was because of his grandfather's friendship with British Prime Minister, William Ewart Gladstone, that he was given his first name. He studied locally at Brighton College whilst also studying Scottish Gaelic and learning to play the Highland war pipes during the holidays. He continued his studies at St Paul's School in London and then studied Classics at Christ Church, Oxford. Mackintosh, who was a member of the University of Oxford Officers' Training Corps, tried to join the army immediately after war broke out in August and while still in his university course. He was rejected on the grounds of his poor eyesight. He reapplied and was accepted by the Seaforth Highlanders, and was commissioned as a second lieutenant on 31 December 1914. He served with the 5th (The Sutherland and Caithness Highland) Battalion, Seaforth Highlanders (a Territorial Force unit), which was part of 51st (Highland) Division with Captain David Sutherland M.C. who subsequently published a war diary based on his reports to the John O'Groat Journal.

He returned to Britain in August 1915 after being wounded in High Wood on the Somme. He was stationed near Cambridge for eight months during which time he was training cadets and he became engaged to Sylvia Marsh who was from a Quaker family.

On 16 May he led a trench raid near Arras where fourteen of his men were wounded and two were killed. One of them, David Sutherland, inspired a poem "In Memoriam". Mackintosh was now a temporary lieutenant and he received the Military Cross on 24 June 1916. His citation in the London Gazette reads:

2nd Lt. (temp. Lt.) Ewart Alan Mackintosh, l/5th Bn., Sea. Highrs., T.F. For conspicuous gallantry. He organised and led a successful raid on the enemy's trenches with great skill and courage. Several of the enemy were disposed of and a strong point destroyed. He also brought back two wounded men under heavy fire.

Mackintosh had been trying to bring Sutherland, who had lost a number of limbs, back to the trenches. Sutherland died of his wounds and had to be left; he has no known burial place, but is commemorated on the Arras Memorial. At the age of 23, Mackintosh regarded himself as a father to his men, and they affectionately called him "Tosh". Sutherland was a Scot, but many of Mackintosh's other charges were from New Zealand. One of Mackintosh's final poems, Cha Till Maccrimmein, appears to foretell his own death.

Mackintosh was killed in action on the second day of the Battle of Cambrai, 21 November 1917, whilst with the 4th Seaforth Highlanders. He was there observing the heavy action near the village of Cantaing. Cambrai was noteworthy in using new tactics including the first mass use of tanks. He was buried in the Orival Wood Cemetery near Flesquières in northern France.

== Legacy ==
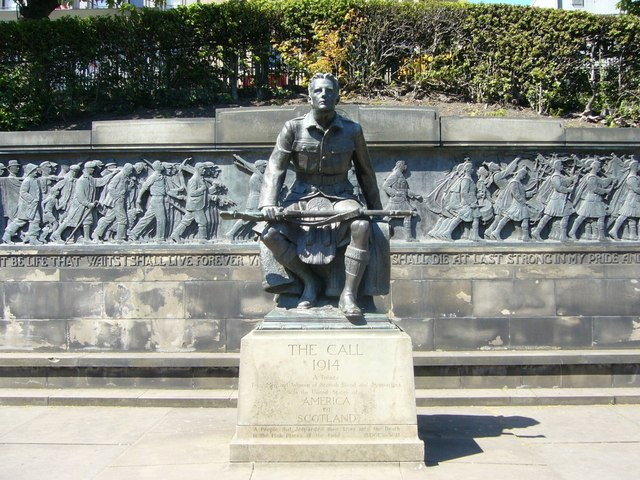
Lines from his poem "A Creed" are used on the Scottish American Memorial in Princes Street Gardens.

His poetry has been said to have been as good as the more famous war poet Rupert Brooke. Lines from his poem "A Creed" are used on "The Call 1914"; the Scottish American Memorial in Edinburgh's Princes Street Gardens when it was installed in 1927. The memorial was paid for by Scottish Americans to commemorate the bravery of the Scottish soldiers of the Great War.

A small ceremony took place in France on the 90th anniversary of Mackintosh's death and there were plans to dedicate a chapel to him and his regiment.

== Works ==
- A Highland Regiment and Other Poems, 1917
- War, The Liberator, and Other Pieces, London, John Lane; New York, John Lane company, 1918.

== Further Information ==
The military Lyn Macdonald used quotes from Mackintosh's poems to introduce Part 1 ("Lads, you're wanted") , Part 3( "High Wood to Waterlot Farm" ) and Part 4( "Into the Mouth of Hell" ) of her book entitled "Somme" published in 1983

== About Mackintosh ==
- Can't Shoot a Man with a Cold: Lt. E. Alan Mackintosh MC 1893 – 1917 Poet of the Highland Division, Colin Campbell and Rosalind Green
