= Bulletin for the History of Chemistry =

Scientific journal

- Discipline: History of science History of chemistry
- Language: English
- Edited by: Carmen J. Giunta

Publication details
- History: 1988–present
- Publisher: American Chemical Society; University of Illinois (United States)
- Frequency: Quarterly

Standard abbreviations
- ISO 4: Bull. Hist. Chem.

Indexing
- ISSN: 1053-4385
- OCLC no.: 20575996

Links
- Journal homepage

The Bulletin for the History of Chemistry is a peer-reviewed scientific journal that publishes articles on the history of chemistry. The journal is published by the History of Chemistry Division of the American Chemical Society. The journal was founded in 1988 as a realization of one of the History Division's co-founders, Edgar Fahs Smith, who attempted to start a journal dedicated to the history of chemistry as early as 1923, but never succeeded; much of the early articles on the history of chemistry were instead recorded in the pages of the Journal of Chemical Education, founded in 1924.
