= Samuel Davidson =

Irish biblical scholar

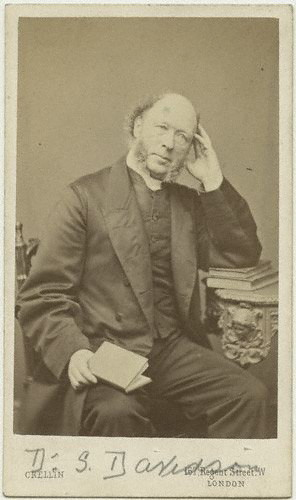
- carte de visite from the mid-1860s.
- Born: September 23, 1807
- Died: April 1, 1898 (aged 90)
- Occupation: Biblical scholar

Samuel Davidson (September 1806 – 1 April 1898) was an Irish biblical scholar.

== Life ==
He was born at Kellswater, County Antrim, the son of Abraham Davidson, into a Scots-Irish presbyterian. He was educated at the village school, under James Darragh, and then in Ballymena till 1824; and then became a student at the Royal Belfast Academical Institution, destined for the presbyterian ministry. His college course included periods in Londonderry and Liverpool, and was completed in 1832.

In November 1833 Davidson was licensed to preach by the Ballymena presbytery. In 1835 the Synod of Ulster made him the first professor of biblical criticism at Belfast College, and he held the post till 1841.

== Congregationalist ==
Becoming a Congregationalist, Davidson accepted in 1842 the chair of biblical criticism, literature and oriental languages at the Lancashire Independent College, in Manchester.

In the summer of 1844 Davidson paid the first of a series of visits to Germany, and made the acquaintance of August Neander, Hermann Hupfeld, August Tholuck and others. He made lifelong friendships. A result of this trip was the translation of two volumes of Johann Karl Ludwig Gieseler's Compendium of Ecclesiastical History (Edinburgh, 1846-7). In 1847 the congregational lecture in London was delivered by Davidson and published in 1848 as the Ecclesiastical Polity of the New Testament. It was reprinted in 1854, contrary to the author's wish. His views had undergone changes, but he was not able to rewrite it.

Davidson was obliged to resign in 1857, clashing with the college authorities over the publication of an introduction to the Old Testament, The Text of the Old Testament, and the Interpretation of the Bible, written for a new edition of Horne's Introduction to the Sacred Scripture. The work began with an approach by Messrs. Longman, in 1854, for help with a reissue of Thomas Hartwell Horne's well-known Introduction to the Sacred Scriptures. Davidson undertook to rewrite the introduction to the Old Testament, and suggested Samuel Prideaux Tregelles should deal with the New Testament. Davidson's work appeared in October 1856 as part of vol. ii. of the tenth edition of Horne's Introduction, as "The Text of the Old Testament Considered; with a Treatise on Sacred Interpretation, and a brief Introduction to the Old Testament Books and the Apocrypha." The reception was hostile. Davidson never lost the feeling that he had from then been treated unjustly.

At the November meeting of the Lancashire College committee it was stated that alarm had been taken in many quarters at the views expressed by Davidson in the new Introduction. A sub-committee was therefore appointed to report. The committee, in February 1857, requested Davidson to prepare "an explanation" of parts of his book deemed objectionable, and to "make concession where concession may be justly due". In May his pamphlet Facts, Statements, and Explanations, was in print. The committee declared those explanations "far from satisfactory", and after correspondence Davidson resigned his post.

Controversy ensued: Davidson was accused of doctrinal unsoundness, and also charged with plagiarism from German writers. A anonymous pamphlet of October 1857, Dr. Davidson: his Heresies, Contradictions, and Plagiarisms. By Two Graduates., along those lines, was by Enoch Mellor, of the Square Chapel, Halifax, who also engaged in the contemporary Rivulet controversy and James Guinness Rogers, of Albion Chapel, Ashton-Under-Lyne. Mellor and Rogers, who were close friends, were students from the first intake of the College. Rogers was on the College's committee, and is thought to have followed the lead of the conservative Thomas Raffles on Davidson's reprimand and removal. Alexander Gordon writing in the Dictionary of National Biography stated that "Nothing contributed more to the expulsion of Davidson from his chair in the Lancashire Independent College than [the pamphlet]."

On the other side appeared Dr. Davidson's Removal from the Professorship of Biblical Literature in the Lancashire Independent College, Manchester, on account of alleged Error in Doctrine, London, 1860, by Thomas Nicholas. At the end of this pamphlet Connop Thirlwall, Henry Alford and William Cureton were quoted in Davidson's favour. An account of the whole proceedings was in Davidson's Autobiography, written by James Allanson Picton.

== Later life ==
In 1862 Davidson moved to London to become scripture examiner in the University of London, and he spent the rest of his life in literary work.

Davidson is sometimes mistakenly listed as a member of the Old Testament Revision Committee for the Revised Version of 1881. The confusion is based on his sharing a surname with Andrew Bruce Davidson, D. D., Professor of Hebrew, Free Church College, Edinburgh, of that committee.

== Works ==
Among his principal works are:

- Sacred Hermeneutics Developed and Applied (1843), rewritten and republished as A Treatise on Biblical Criticism (1852)
- Lectures on Ecclesiastical Polity (1848)
- An Introduction to the New Testament (1848), Samuel Bagster [publishing], Google eBook full read
- The Hebrew Text of the Old Testament Revised (1855)
- Introduction to the Old Testament (1862)
- On a Fresh Revision of the Old Testament (1873)
- The Canon of the Bible (1877)
- The Doctrine of Last Things in the New Testament (1883)

Also translations of the New Testament from Tischendorf's text, Gieseler's Ecclesiastical History (1846), and Fürst's Hebrew and Chaldee Lexicon.

Academic offices
New title	Professor of Biblical Criticism of the Synod of Ulster (1835-40) and of the Presbyterian Church in Ireland (1840-42); 1835-1842	Succeeded by Robert Wilson
