= John Chivers =

Australian rules footballer

Personal information
- Full name: John Chivers
- Born: 6 November 1944 (age 81)
- Original team: Clarence
- Height: 177 cm (5 ft 10 in)
- Weight: 76 kg (168 lb)

Playing career^{1}
Years	Club	Games (Goals)
1965	Richmond	2 (0)
- ^{1} Playing statistics correct to the end of 1965.

John Chivers (born 6 November 1944) is a former Australian rules footballer who played with Richmond in the Victorian Football League (VFL).
