= Wesleys Creek =

Wesleys Creek ruisseau Wesleys
- Location of the mouth of Wesleys Creek in Southern Ontario

Location
- Country: Canada
- Province: Ontario
- Region: Eastern Ontario
- Counties: Frontenac County; Lanark County
- Municipalities: Central Frontenac; Tay Valley

Physical characteristics
- Source: Confluence of two unnamed streams
  - location: Tay Valley, Lanark County
  - coordinates: 44°52′32″N 76°32′55″W
  - elevation: 212 metres (696 ft)
- Mouth: Silver Lake
  - location: Central Frontenac, Frontenac County
  - coordinates: 44°49′58″N 76°35′55″W
  - elevation: 178 metres (584 ft)
- Length: 7 kilometres (4.3 mi)

Basin features
- River system: Ottawa River drainage basin

Wesleys Creek (French: ruisseau Wesleys) is a stream in Central Frontenac, Frontenac County, and Tay Valley, Lanark County in Eastern Ontario, Canada. It flows to Silver Lake and is in the Ottawa River drainage basin.

== Course ==
Wesleys Creek begins at the confluence of two unnamed streams in Tay Valley, at an elevation of 212 metres (696 ft). It flows southwest, and enters Central Frontenac. The creek then jogs northwest, southwest, south, and finally southeast, and reaches its mouth at Silver Lake, at an elevation of 178 metres (584 ft). Silver Lake flows via Silver Lake Creek, the Fall River and the Mississippi River to Lac des Chats on the Ottawa River.

The creek has numerous unnamed but no named inflows.
