= Silver Lake (Lanark–Frontenac) =

- lac Silver
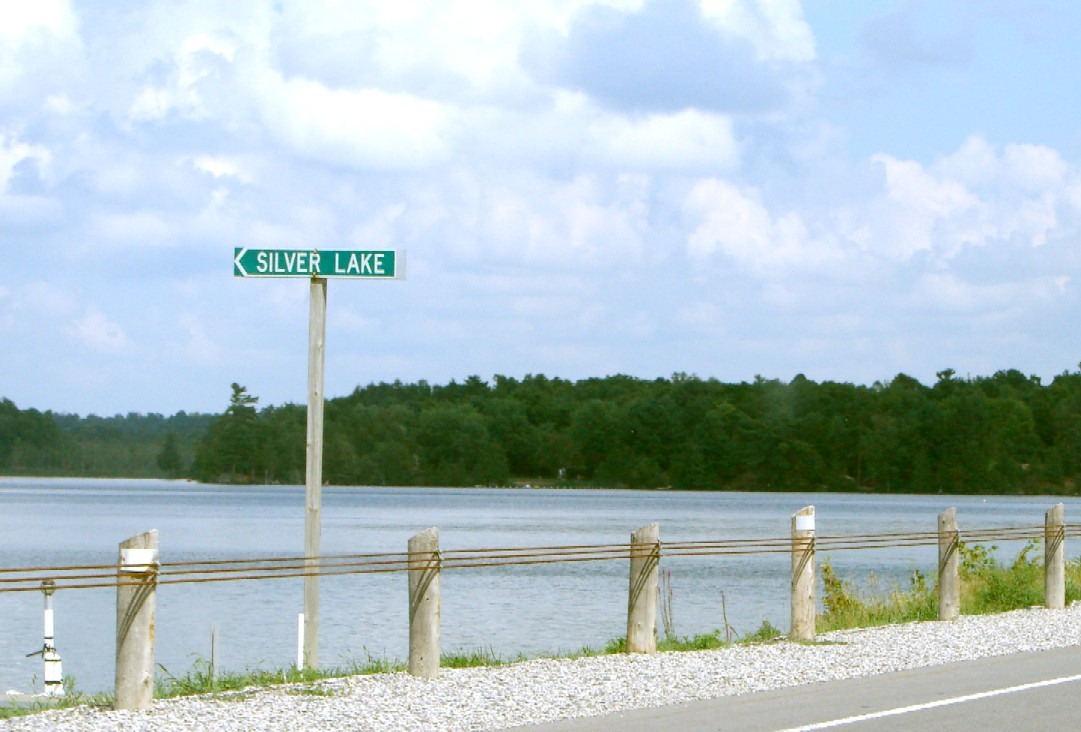
- View of Silver Lake from Ontario Highway 7, with Silver Lake Provincial Park in the background at right

- Location in Southern Ontario
- Location: Lanark County and Frontenac County, Ontario
- Coordinates: 44°49′39″N 76°35′58″W
- Type: lake
- Part of: Ottawa River drainage basin
- Primary inflows: Wesleys Creek
- Primary outflows: Silver Lake Creek
- Basin countries: Canada
- Max. length: 4.1 kilometres (2.5 mi)
- Max. width: .8 kilometres (0.50 mi)
- Surface area: 248.98 hectares (615 acres)
- Surface elevation: 178 metres (584 ft)

Silver Lake (French: lac Silver) is a lake in Tay Valley, Lanark County, and Central Frontenac, Frontenac County, in Eastern Ontario, Canada. It is the source of Silver Lake Creek and is in the Ottawa River drainage basin.

== Geography ==
Silver Lake has an area of 248.98 hectares (615 acres) and lies at an elevation of 178 metres (584 ft) It is 4.1 kilometres (2.5 mi) long and .8 kilometres (0.50 mi) wide. Approximately the western two-thirds of the lake is in Central Frontenac, and the eastern third in Tay Valley. Ontario Highway 7 runs along the southern shore of the lake, which leads to the community of Maberly, 3 kilometres (1.9 mi) by road along Highway 7 to the east; it along with the dispersed rural community of Zealand, northwest of the lake, are the two nearest communities. The nearest larger centre is the town of Perth, 30 kilometres (19 mi) by road east along Highway 7.

The lake has one named inflow, Wesleys Creek, at the centre north; there are several unnamed secondary inflows. The primary outflow, at the eastern end of the lake, is Silver Lake Creek, which flows via the Fall River and the Mississippi River to Lac des Chats on the Ottawa River.

== Recreation ==
Silver Lake Provincial Park is at the eastern end of the lake and encompasses the Silver Lake Creek outflow. The park has 100 campsites. It also has a sandy beach, and canoeing (rentals available), hiking and fishing are permitted; there is a boat ramp.

A road rest area at the middle of the southern shore of the lake on the north side of Highway 7 has a small sandy beach and picnic facilities.

A private camp, Silver Lake Wesleyan Camp, is operated by the Wesleyan Church on the north shore of the lake.

== Natural history ==
The lake has northern pike, smallmouth bass, lake trout, yellow perch and sunfish. A short hiking trail in Silver Lake Provincial Park highlights the transition between two ecological zones: marsh and upland forest.
