= 2014 Lanark County municipal elections =

Canadian municipal election

Elections were held in Lanark County, Ontario on October 27, 2014, in conjunction with municipal elections across the province.

== Lanark County Council ==
Lanark County Council consists of two members from each constituent municipality.

| Position | Elected |
|---|---|
| Beckwith Reeve | Richard Kidd (acclaimed) |
| Beckwith Deputy Reeve | Sharon Mousseau |
| Carleton Place Mayor | Louis Antonakos |
| Carleton Place Deputy Mayor | Jerry Flynn |
| Drummond/North Elmsley Reeve | Aubrey Churchill |
| Drummond/North Elmsley Deputy Reeve | (selected from council) |
| Lanark Highlands Mayor | Brian Stewart |
| Lanark Higlands Deputy Mayor | John Hall |
| Mississippi Mills Mayor | Shaun McLaughlin |
| Mississippi Mills Councillor | (selected from council) |
| Montague Reeve | Bill Dobson |
| Montague Deputy Reeve | Klaas VanDerMeer |
| Perth Mayor | John Fenik (acclaimed) |
| Perth Deputy Mayor | John Gemmell (acclaimed) |
| Tay Valley Reeve | Keith James Kerr (acclaimed) |
| Tay Valley Deputy Reeve | Brian Campbell |

== Beckwith ==
| Mayoral Candidate | Vote | % |
|---|---|---|
| Richard Kidd (X) | Acclaimed | |

== Carleton Place ==
| Mayoral Candidate | Vote | % |
|---|---|---|
| Louis Antonakos | 1,903 | 53.70 |
| Wendy J. LeBlanc (X) | 1,641 | 46.30 |

== Drummond/North Elmsley ==
| Reeve Candidate | Vote | % |
|---|---|---|
| Aubrey Churchill (X) | 858 | 70.39 |
| Ted Arthurs | 233 | 19.11 |
| Adian St. Pierre | 128 | 10.50 |

== Lanark Highlands ==
| Mayoral Candidate | Vote | % |
|---|---|---|
| Brian Stewart | 1,732 | 54.69 |
| Peter McLaren (X) | 1,435 | 45.31 |

== Mississippi Mills ==
| Mayoral Candidate | Vote | % |
|---|---|---|
| Shaun McLaughlin | 2,033 | 38.18 |
| John Levi (X) | 1,972 | 37.03 |
| Garry Dalgity | 1,320 | 24.79 |

== Montague ==
| Mayoral Candidate | Vote | % |
|---|---|---|
| Bill Dobson (X) | 960 | 62.10 |
| Gary Doyle | 586 | 37.90 |

== Perth ==
| Mayoral Candidate | Vote | % |
|---|---|---|
| John Fenik (X) | Acclaimed | |

== Tay Valley ==
| Reeve Candidate | Vote | % |
|---|---|---|
| Keith James Kerr (X) | Acclaimed | |
