= Silver Lake Creek =

Stream in Lanark County, Ontario, Canada

Silver Lake Creek ruisseau du lac Silver
- Location of the mouth of Silver Lake Creek in Southern Ontario

Location
- Country: Canada
- Province: Ontario
- Region: Eastern Ontario
- County: Lanark County
- Municipality: Tay Valley

Physical characteristics
- Source: Silver Lake
  - coordinates: 44°50′00″N 76°34′35″W
  - elevation: 178 metres (584 ft)
- Mouth: Fall River
  - coordinates: 44°49′59″N 76°33′15″W
  - elevation: 177 metres (581 ft)
- Length: 2.0 kilometres (1.2 mi)

Basin features
- River system: Ottawa River drainage basin

Silver Lake Creek (French: ruisseau du lac Silver) is a short stream in Tay Valley, Lanark County in Eastern Ontario, Canada. It flows from Silver Lake to the Fall River and is in the Ottawa River drainage basin.

== Course ==
Silver Lake Creek begins at Silver Lake at an elevation of 178 metres (584 ft), at that point within Silver Lake Provincial Park. It heads south, exits the park, then turns southeast, passes under Ontario Highway 7, and reaches its mouth at the Fall River, at an elevation of 177 metres (581 ft). The Fall River flows via the Mississippi River to Lac des Chats on the Ottawa River.
