= Silver Lake Provincial Park (Ontario) =

Provincial park in Ontario, Canada

- IUCN category II (national park)
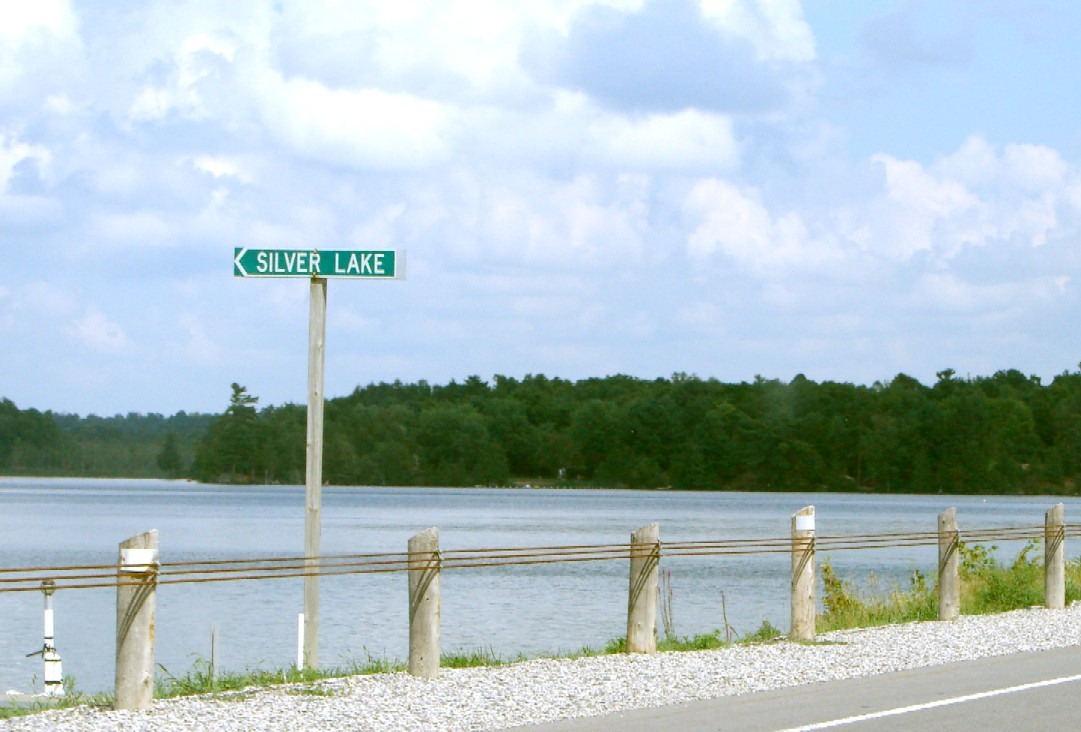
- Silver Lake with the provincial park in the background

- Location within Southern Ontario
- Interactive map of Silver Lake Provincial Park
- Location: Lanark County, Ontario, Canada
- Nearest city: Perth
- Coordinates: 44°49′50″N 76°34′40″W
- Area: 43.23 ha (106.8 acres)
- Established: 1958
- Visitors: 43,078 (in 2022)
- Governing body: Ontario Parks
- Website: www.ontarioparks.com/park/silverlake

Silver Lake Provincial Park is a provincial recreation park in the municipality of Tay Valley, Lanark County in Eastern Ontario, Canada. It is on Ontario Highway 7 near the community of Maberly, approximately 30 kilometres (19 mi) away from Perth, Ontario, and is located on a lake of the same name.

Park activities include:

- Canoeing/boating
- Fishing - Northern pike, Smallmouth bass, Lake trout, Yellow perch, and sunfish.
- Hiking - A boardwalk crosses a marsh at the eastern end of Silver Lake. The marsh is a transition between wetland and upland forest which is rich in flora and fauna.
- Wildlife viewing - A wide variety of animals, including skunks, woodchucks, raccoons, rabbits and chipmunks live here. Harmless snakes, painted turtles, toads, bullfrogs and leopard frogs inhabit the wetland. Overhead, see and hear the eastern kingbird and red-winged blackbird.
