= Thomas Joseph Scanlon =

Canadian scholar of disasters

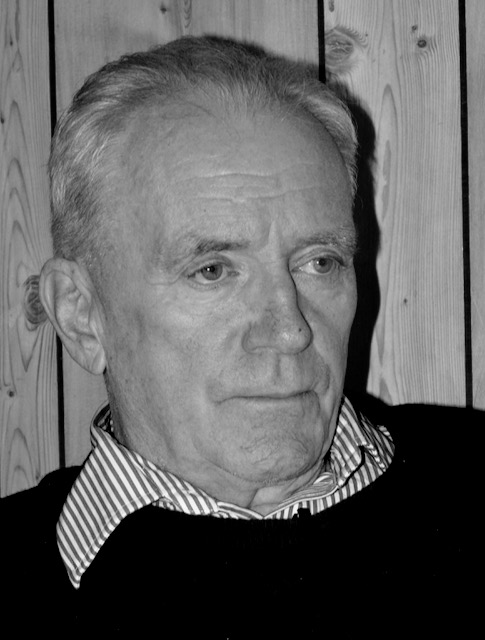
- Thomas Joseph Scanlon
- Born: January 2, 1933; Ottawa, Ontario, Canada
- Died: May 2, 2015 (aged 82); Kingston, Ontario, Canada
- Other names: Joe Scanlon
- Occupations: Journalist, professor
- Years active: 1955-2015
- Known for: disaster research

Thomas Joseph (Joe) Scanlon (2 January 1933 – 2 May 2015) was a Canadian professor of journalism, and a scholar of disasters.

Scanlon was a reporter with the Toronto Star in the late 1950s and early 1960s, reporting from Toronto, Washington, and Ottawa. He subsequently taught journalism at Carleton University's School of Journalism and Communication, in Ottawa, from 1965 to 1995. He was the school's second director from 1966 to 1973.

In the 1960s, while studying political science, Scanlon became interested in the interpersonal spread of information during dramatic events. In the early 1970s, he established the Emergency Communications Research Unit (ECRU) at Carleton University, in Ottawa. Supported by an on-call team of journalism students, for two decades Scanlon led field studies of incidents and disasters across Canada with a view to understanding information flow. He went on to an international career studying the sociology of disaster, to include mass casualties and pandemics.

In 2002, the International Sociological Association's Research Committee on Disasters awarded Scanlon its Charles E. Fritz Award for Career Achievements in the Social Science Disaster Area, which is bestowed every four years at the ISA's World Congress.

Having achieved the status of full professor, he was designated professor emeritus after retirement.

== Early life and education ==
Scanlon was born in Ottawa to Jack (John James) and Edna Young (née Coulter) Scanlon. Also of Irish descent, his mother Edna was born in Almonte, Ontario. In Ottawa, she became prominent in the Anglican Church of Canada, including as a member of the Dominion Board of the Women's Auxiliary.

Scanlon studied journalism at Carleton University, where he wrote about sports for the student newspaper the Carleton (today The Charlatan) and managed the men's basketball team. He graduated with the University Medal for Journalism in 1955.

In the late 1950s he took a job reporting for the Toronto Star. He was also an editor and field producer for CBC Television on their flagship news program, The National.

In 1964 he received a Master of Arts (Political Science) from Queen's University, in Kingston, Ontario.

== Career ==
During his career, Scanlon conducted studies of crises, from hostage takings to plane crashes, forest fires to toxic spills, and finally from mass casualties to pandemics. He also began to research the 1917 Halifax explosion, one of North America's worst disasters.

In 1980, he formed Scanlon Associates to consult in emergency management and conduct research under contract. For Canada's Federal Environmental Protection Agency, he looked at the emergency plans for LePreau II, a nuclear power station in New Brunswick. For the Solicitor General of Canada, he looked at the law enforcement responses to the 1994 Air France hijacking in Marseilles, France, and the 1993 Branch Davidians in Waco, Texas. For the Regional Municipality of Ottawa-Carleton he studied how the region responded to the 1998 Eastern Canada ice storm.

In 1987–88, Scanlon was visiting professor at the Disaster Research Center (DRC), Department of Sociology, University of Delaware. His disaster papers now reside in the DRC's E.L. Quarantelli Resource Collection. Scanlon considered Henry Quarantelli a friend and mentor.

From 1994 to 1998, Scanlon served as president of the International Sociological Association's Research Committee for the Sociology of Disasters. In 1996, he became general editor of a series of six books on disaster sponsored by the Research Committee. Among other duties, he helped organize the committee's 2010 quadrennial meeting in Gothenburg, Sweden.

In 2003–4, he received an Oak Ridge Fellowship, which allowed him to work with Dr. Erik Auf der Heide on a study of the problems associated with contaminated casualties, a project led by the Agency for Toxic Substances and Disease Registry, a Centers for Disease Control and Prevention agency, in Atlanta, Georgia.

In the wake of the 26 December 2004 Indian Ocean tsunami, Scanlon was part of a team funded by the U.S. National Science Foundation to look at the handling of the tsunami dead, headed by Dr. Henry Fischer of Millersville University. Scanlon's role was to review the overseas response. He visited Israel, the Netherlands, the United Kingdom, Denmark, Sweden, Norway, New Zealand, and Australia.

In 2006, he and three colleagues received funds from the Canadian Social Science and Humanities Research Council to examine the Canadian mass death network. That research led to a further SSHRC grant to study the way three Ontario communities—St. Thomas, Kingston, and Kenora—dealt with disease and death during the second deadly wave of the Spanish Flu in late 1918 and early 1920.

For one of his last projects, Scanlon teamed up with Dr. Heather Sparling, an ethnomusicologist at Cape Breton University, to study folk songs about death and disaster. They studied folk songs about mass death mining incidents in Nova Scotia and about Titanic, which showed folk songs are an important way people learn about past events and that, unlike the media, movies, and novels, they often don't distort how ordinary people behave in untoward incidents.

Early in his disaster research, Scanlon became very interested in the devastating 1917 Halifax explosion and, in particular, the pioneering disaster research of Samuel Henry Prince, a Canadian priest who wrote his Ph.D. in sociology on the catastrophe.

Scanlon died in 2015, while attending Carleton University's spring conference in Kingston, Ontario.

== Posthumous recognition ==
In 2016 the not-for-profit Canadian Risk and Hazards Network (CRHNet) established its T. Joseph Scanlon Lifetime Achievement Award.

In 2018, the International Sociological Association's Research Committee on Disasters inaugurated The T. Joseph Scanlon Student Travel Award.

In November 2020, Wilfrid Laurier University Press printed Scanlon's book on the devastating 1917 Halifax explosion. Finished in 2007, the manuscript was edited after Scanlon's death by Canadian military historian Dr. Roger Sarty, and published with the title Catastrophe: Stories and Lessons from the Halifax Explosion.
