= Joseph Yuill =

Joseph Yuill was a Canadian farmer and educator.

Yuill was born to Alexander Yuill and Ellen Aitken-head in Ramsay Township, Upper Canada in 1838. His father had emigrated there from Glasgow in 1821, and started farming grains, as well as cattle, pigs and sheep. When his father retired from farming, Joseph inherited the farm, which he named Meadowside. On March 10, 1864, Yuill married Margaret Cochrane. The pair would have a total of nine children.

The Yuills began breeding Shropshire sheep, Berkshire hogs, and Barred Plymouth Rock chickens, but the most important animals raised on their farm were Ayrshire cattle, which they began breeding in 1868. At the time, most farmers preferred cattle breeds useful for both meat and dairy, while Ayrshire cattle are dairy cows. The Yuills' Ayrshires' began winning prizes at local fairs, and at exhibitions in Toronto and Ottawa. The farm eventually had a herd of 75 Ayrshires, which Yuill claimed was the largest in Canada. In 1893, one of the Yuills bulls won first prize at the Columbian exposition in Chicago.

Margaret supervised the dairy, which began producing high-quality butter that attracted notice. The farm produced 1,500 pounds (680 kg) of butter a year. The pair created Ontario's first "travelling dairy", giving seminars and lectures on butter making. This began when Aaron Abel Wright, a Renfrew merchant and butter-dealer suggested the pair give a lesson at a Farmers’ Institute meeting in his hometown. The first such lesson attracted more than 600 attendees, and Wright financed a week-long series of such lessons, with two a day. The couple started regularly giving such lessons, to groups at Farmers’ Institutes, the Ontario Agricultural and Experimental Union and the Dairymen’s Association of Eastern Ontario. These would cover subjects such as milk handling, butter making, raising calves and winter care of chickens. Joseph also wrote articles in agricultural journals. He was the president of the Dominion Ayrshire Breeders' Association from 1891 to 1893.

When Yuill died in 1905, his farm covered 600 acres (2.4 km^{2}), and included two large stock barns and a windmill. The farm Meadowside was left to his son Alexander, and a second farm in Elmhurst was left to his son Andrew. He died on the farm Meadowside, the same place he had been born, and his body was buried in Auld Kirk Cemetery near Almonte, Ontario.
