= Chats Falls =

Historical waterfalls on the Ottawa River in Ontario and Quebec, Canada

Chute-des-Chats generating station
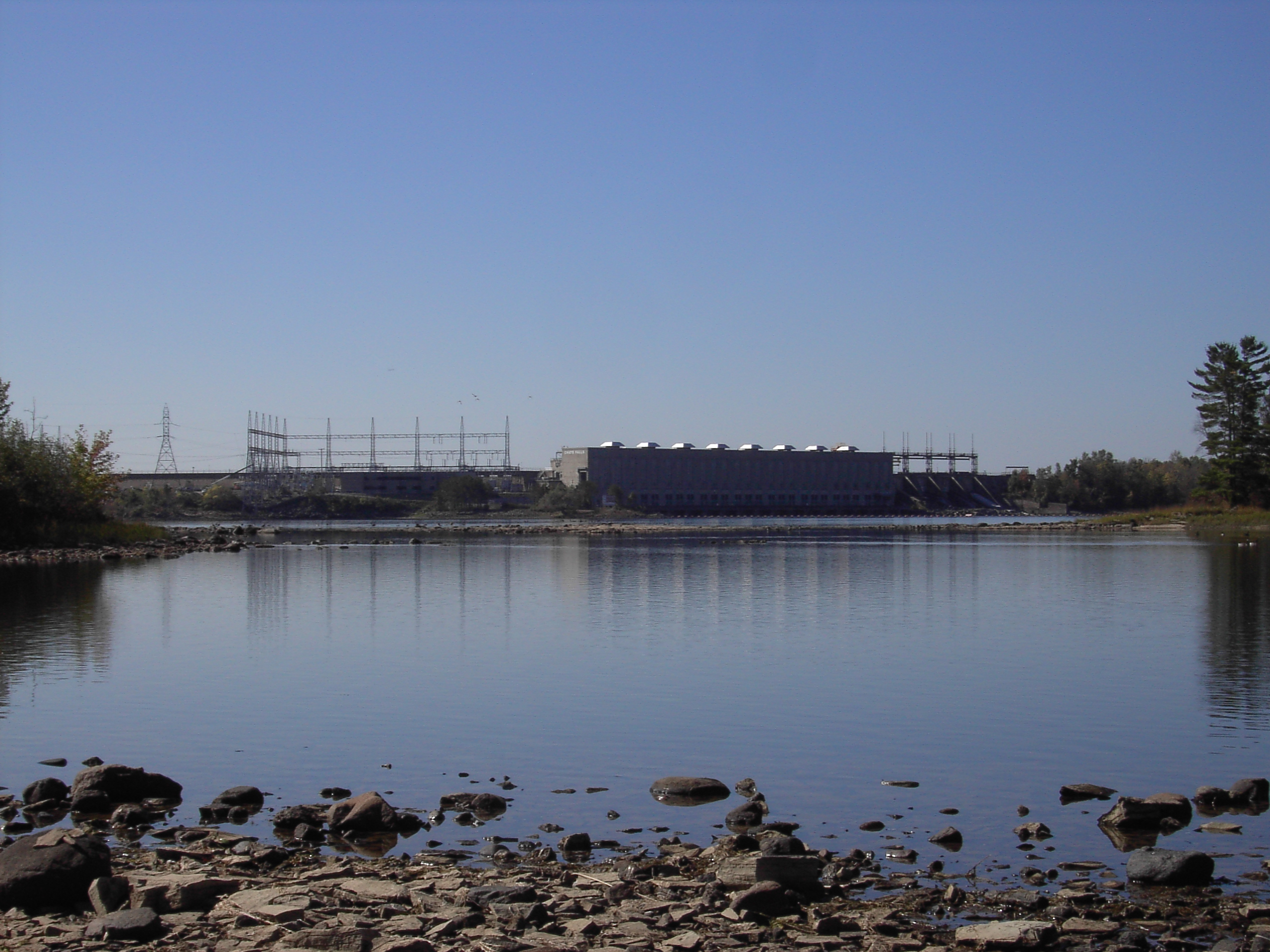
- The Chats Falls generating station
- Interactive map of Chute-des-Chats generating station
- Official name: Centrale de la Chute-des-Chats
- Coordinates: 45°28′30″N 76°14′18″W

Dam and spillways
- Impounds: Ottawa River

Reservoir
- Creates: Chats Lake (Lac des Chats)

Power Station
- Hydraulic head: 16.16 m (53.0 ft)

Chats Falls (in French: Chute des Chats, meaning "Cat Falls") were a set of waterfalls on the Ottawa River, near Fitzroy Harbour, Ontario, and Quyon, Quebec, Canada. The site is the location of a hydroelectric generating station, owned and operated jointly by Hydro-Québec and Ontario Power Generation. It lies within the cities of Ottawa, Ontario, and Pontiac, Quebec.

== History ==
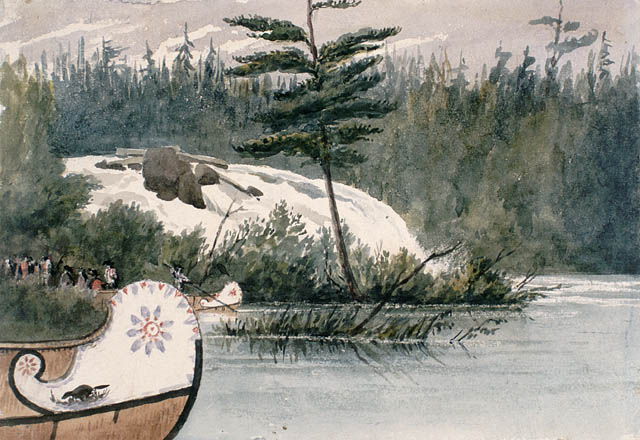
The Chats Falls in 1838.

Prior to the construction of the dam and power generating station, the Chats Falls was a waterfall with a 10.7 metres (35 ft) drop in the river, and consisted of a series of chutes running from what is now the eastern end of the dam all the way to the westernmost corner of Pontiac Bay (45°29′00″N 76°15′15″W). In their natural state the Chats Falls were a tourist attraction. In the years leading up to World War One it was fairly common to see large steam boats (paddle wheelers) heading up river with their decks full of sightseers.

In 1786, a homestead was built on what is known today as Indian Point on the northern end of Pontiac Bay. In 1800 this property was taken over by the XY Company, followed by the North West Company in 1804, and then the Hudson's Bay Company (HBC) in 1821, when these two companies merged. The HBC operated the Chats trading post (also known as The Chats and Chats Falls) as part of its Lake of Two Mountains District. In 1828, the HBC purchased Chats farm located opposite the rapids, relocated the trading post there, and also built a new retail store. However the store was not profitable and was closed a year later, reverting back to a fur trade post. In 1836, the headquarters of Lake of Two Mountains District were moved to Chats, but the following year, the headquarters moved back to Lake of Two Mountains when the HBC sold the Chats post due to declining fur trade.

=== Horse railway ===
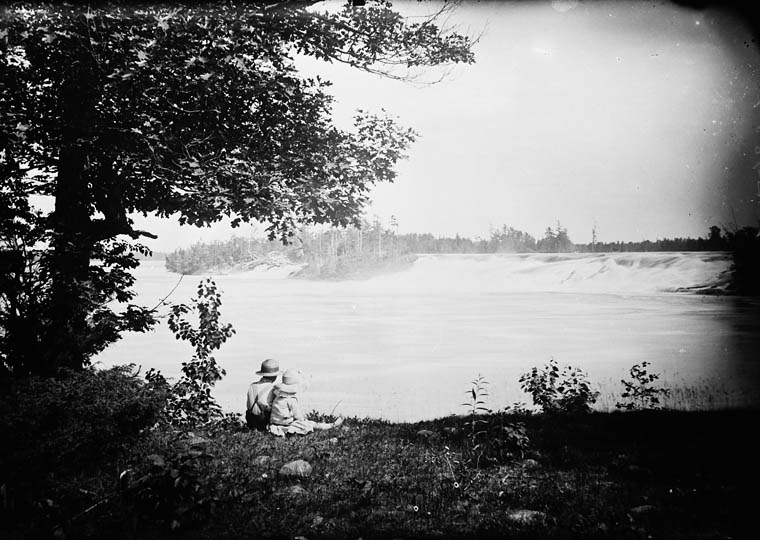
The Chats Falls circa 1910.

In 1847, the Union Rail Road was established at Chats Falls. Passengers were treated to a horse-drawn railroad trip of 5 kilometres (3.1 mi) through the dense forest skirting the rough waters. While the roof sheltered passengers from rain and sun, the sides were open to mosquitoes, which brought complaints from many of the river travelers.

In 1853, James Poole, editor of The Carleton Place Herald, wrote about the Chats Falls horse railway:

"Certainly this is one of the last things you dare to hope for in the heart of the wilderness far away from either a road or a cow-path - and you must almost doubt whether it is a reality, or like the palace of Aladdin, you are not under the mysterious influence of some kind genii for your present position."

== Generating station ==
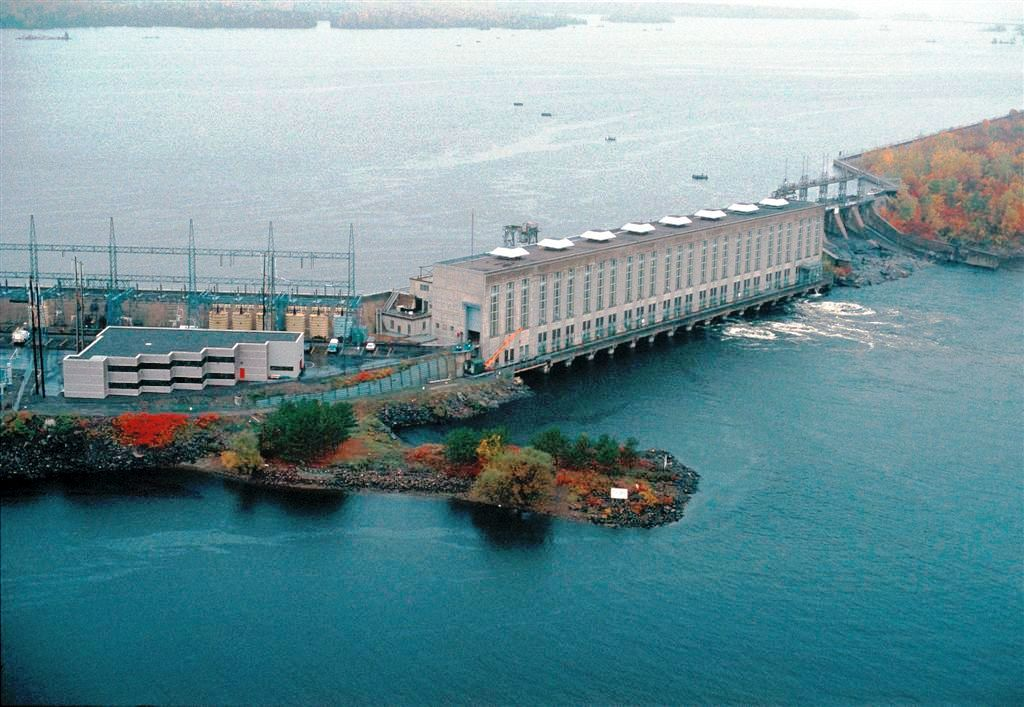
Chats Falls generating station

Construction on a run-of-river generating station and dam began in 1929 and was completed in 1932, destroying the falls and creating Lac des Chats reservoir behind the dam. The powerhouse is in the middle of the Ottawa River on the Ontario/Quebec border.

On March 2, 1953, a fire started in the morning, burning for 7 hours and destroying 2 generators and the building's roof. The station went completely down when the cables were damaged. Two of the eight generating units were brought back into operation the following day and another four units brought on-line the following week. In all, $2 million in damage was done.

The power station has 8 turbines (4 managed by Ontario Power Generation and 4 managed by Hydro-Québec) with a head of 16.16 metres (53.0 ft), generating a total of 192 megawatts (257,000 hp).

== See also ==
- List of crossings of the Ottawa River
