= Mississippi Valley Conservation Authority =

Conservation authority in Ontario, Canada

The Mississippi Valley Conservation Authority (MVCA) (formerly Mississippi Valley Conservation (MVC)) is a conservation authority in the province of Ontario. It is headquartered in Carleton Place, Ontario and serves a 4450 km^{2} watershed located across eleven municipalities. The organization is responsible for both the Mississippi River watershed and the Carp River watershed.

== Conservation areas ==
- Carp River
- K&P
- Mill of Kintail
- Morris Island
- Palmerston-Canonto
- Purdon
