= Christie Lake =

Lake in Ontario, Canada

- Location within Ontario Location within Canada
- Location: Ontario, Canada
- Coordinates: 44.80°N 76.44°W
- Type: lake
- Islands: 31

Christie Lake is approximately 15 kilometres (9.3 mi) southwest of Perth, Ontario in the Tay Valley township. The watershed is characterized by thin soil and areas of exposed bedrock. The lake has a long, irregular shoreline, with rocky outcrops and steep cliffs throughout most of the northern and southern shoreline. There are 31 islands. The lake affords recreational activities of boating, fishing, kayaking and canoeing.

== Things to do ==
- Boating/Kayaking
- Christie Lake Sailing Club
- Fishing and Hunting
- Island Etiquette
- Swimming
