= Purdon Conservation Area =

Conservation area in Ontario, Canada

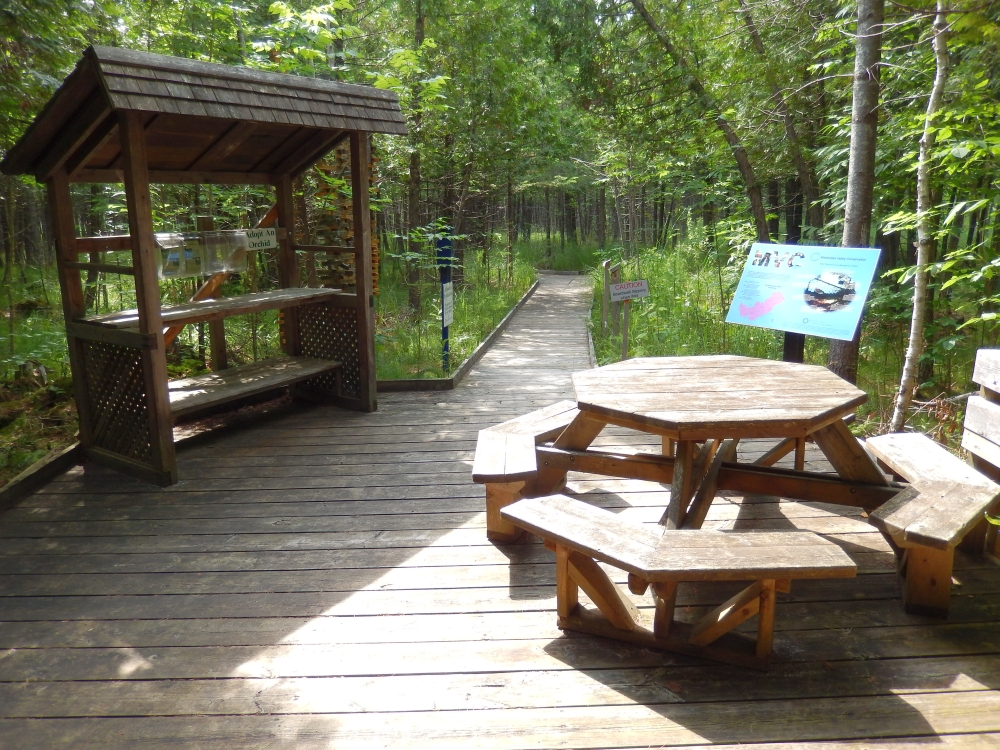
- Beginning of the boardwalk

- Location within Southern Ontario
- Location: Lanark County, Ontario, Canada
- Nearest city: Ottawa
- Coordinates: 44°59′29″N 76°32′43″W
- Area: 25 hectares (62 acres)
- Established: 1984
- Website: mvc.on.ca/conservation-areas/purdon/

The Purdon Conservation Area in the municipality of Lanark Highlands, Lanark County, in Eastern Ontario, Canada. Located near the community of Lanark, it is operated by the Mississippi Valley Conservation Authority.

The Purdon Conservation Area supports Canada's largest native colony of showy lady slipper orchids, some 16,000 plants. A smaller grouping of the orchids was discovered in the 1930s by Joe Purdon, after whom the conservation area is named, and who grew it to its larger size.

It is open to the public from Victoria Day to Thanksgiving every year.
