= Morris Island Conservation Area =

Conservation area in Ontario, Canada

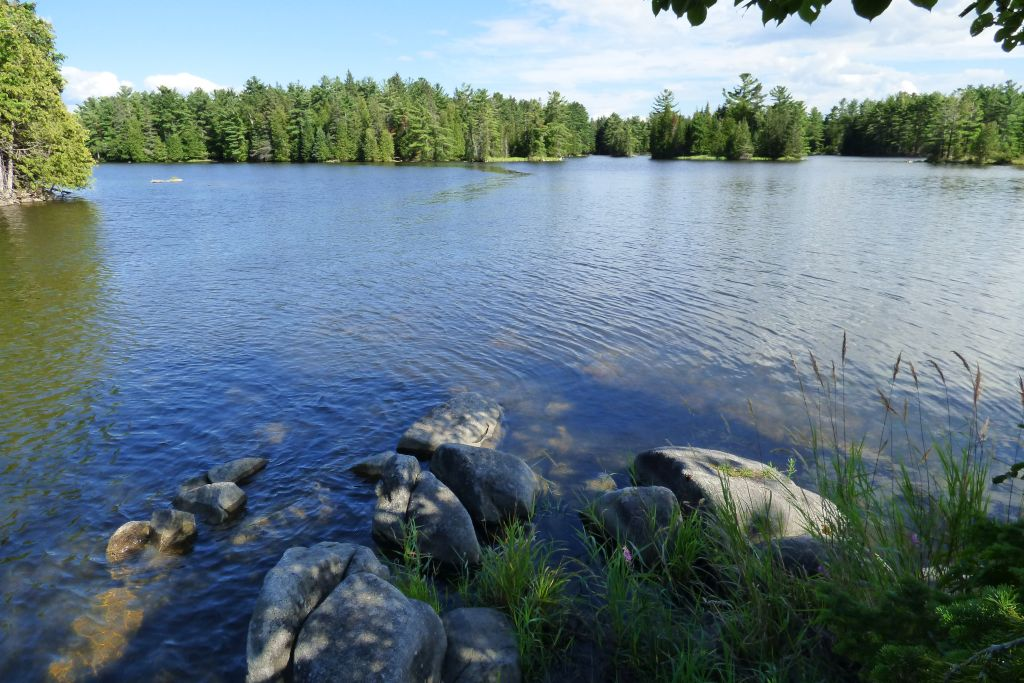
- The lagoon, Morris Island CA

- Location within Ontario
- Location: Ottawa, Ontario, Canada
- Nearest city: Ottawa
- Coordinates: 45°27′33″N 76°16′17″W
- Area: 47 hectares (120 acres)
- Website: mvc.on.ca/places-to-see/morris-island/

The Morris Island Conservation Area is operated by the Mississippi Valley Conservation Authority.

Located on the Ottawa River near Fitzroy Harbour, the Morris Island Conservation Area consists of 47 hectares of forested woodlands and wetlands. It allows for hiking, picnicking, canoeing (within the bay areas of the island), and fishing (including accessible fishing platforms).
