= Fall River (Ontario) =

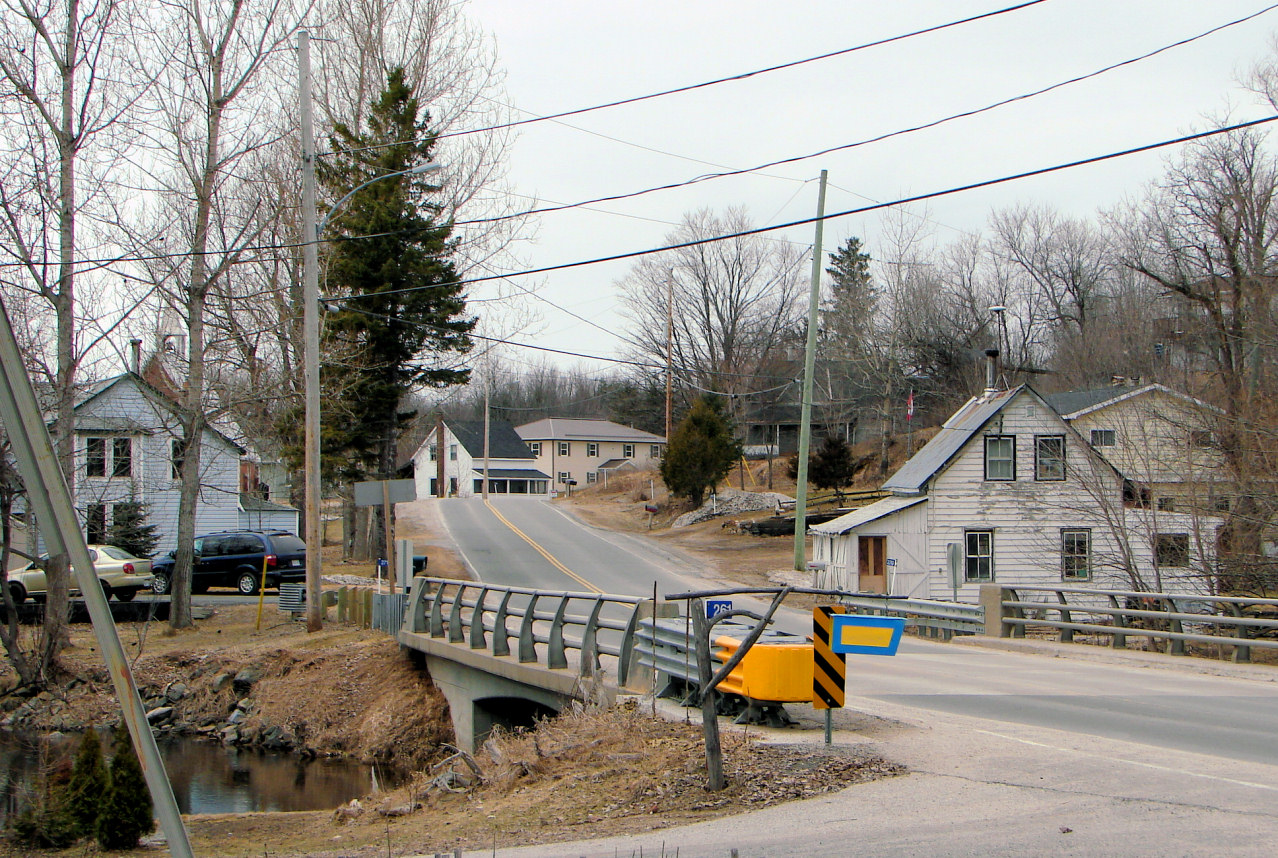
- Bridge over the Fall River in Maberly

- Location of the mouth of the Fall River in southern Ontario

Location
- Country: Canada
- Province: Ontario
- Region: Eastern Ontario
- Counties: Frontenac; Lanark

Physical characteristics
- Source: Sharbot Lake
  - location: Central Frontenac, Frontenac County
  - coordinates: 44°46′28″N 76°38′25″W
  - elevation: 193 m (633 ft)
- Mouth: Mississippi River
  - location: Tay Valley, Lanark County
  - coordinates: 44°58′23″N 76°21′37″W
  - elevation: 138 m (453 ft)
- Length: 50 km (31 mi)

Basin features
- Progression: Mississippi River→ Ottawa River→ St. Lawrence River→ Gulf of St. Lawrence
- River system: Ottawa River drainage basin
- Tributaries
  - left: Bolton Creek; Silver Lake Creek

The Fall River is a river in Frontenac and Lanark Counties in Eastern Ontario, Canada. It is part of the Ottawa River drainage basin, and flows from Sharbot Lake and through Bennett Lake to join the Mississippi River. The river is named after settlers of the late 17th century..

== Course ==
The Fall River is fed from Sharbot Lake in Central Frontenac, Frontenac County and numerous springs, and it meanders along the Trans Canada Trail. It passes into Tay Valley, Lanark County and flows through the community of Maberly; fills the 20 km of Bennett Lake; flows by the community of Fallbrook; and about 50 kilometres (31 mi) from its origin, reaches its mouth at the Mississippi River.

== Ecology ==
The river is bordered by forest and is home to fish, turtles, Blue Herons, beaver and otters

== Tributaries ==
- Bolton Creek
- Silver Lake Creek

== See also ==
- List of rivers of Ontario

== Sources ==
- "Mississippi River watershed map" (JPG). Mississippi Valley Conservation. 2009.
