= Pakenham Bridge =

Coordinates: 45°20′8.3″N 76°17′13.4″W

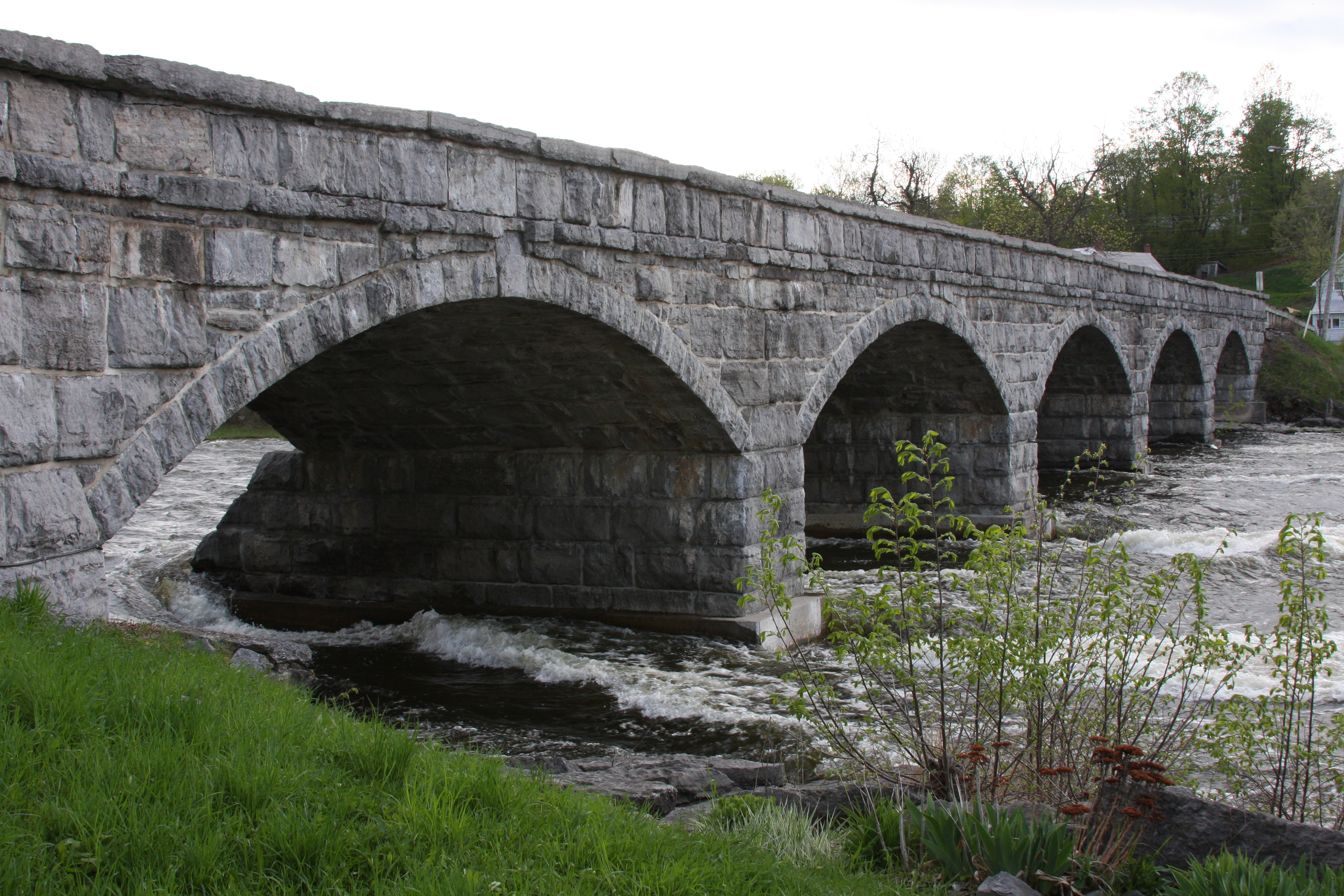
Pakenham Bridge, May 2009

The Pakenham Bridge is a stone bridge with five arches that crosses the Mississippi River at the town of Pakenham within Mississippi Mills, Ontario, Canada. The bridge measures 268 feet (82 m) long, 22 feet (6.7 m) high, and 25 feet (7.6 m) wide. It is the only one of this type in North America.

The bridge was built in 1903 by O'Toole & Keating, Scottish masons from Ottawa, for a cost of $14,500. The stones, the largest of which weighs 5 tons, came from a local quarry. As a result of local pressure to preserve it, the bridge was never replaced with a newer one and restored in 1984. At that time, the bridge was also strengthened with reinforced concrete to accommodate car and truck traffic.

With a parking lot and rapids right at the bridge, it is a popular picnic spot. Here the Mississippi River drops a few meters over a wide cascade with exposed bedrock, but below the rapids there is a strong undertow that has claimed several lives.
