= Montague, Ontario =

Montague
- Township (lower-tier)
- Township of Montague
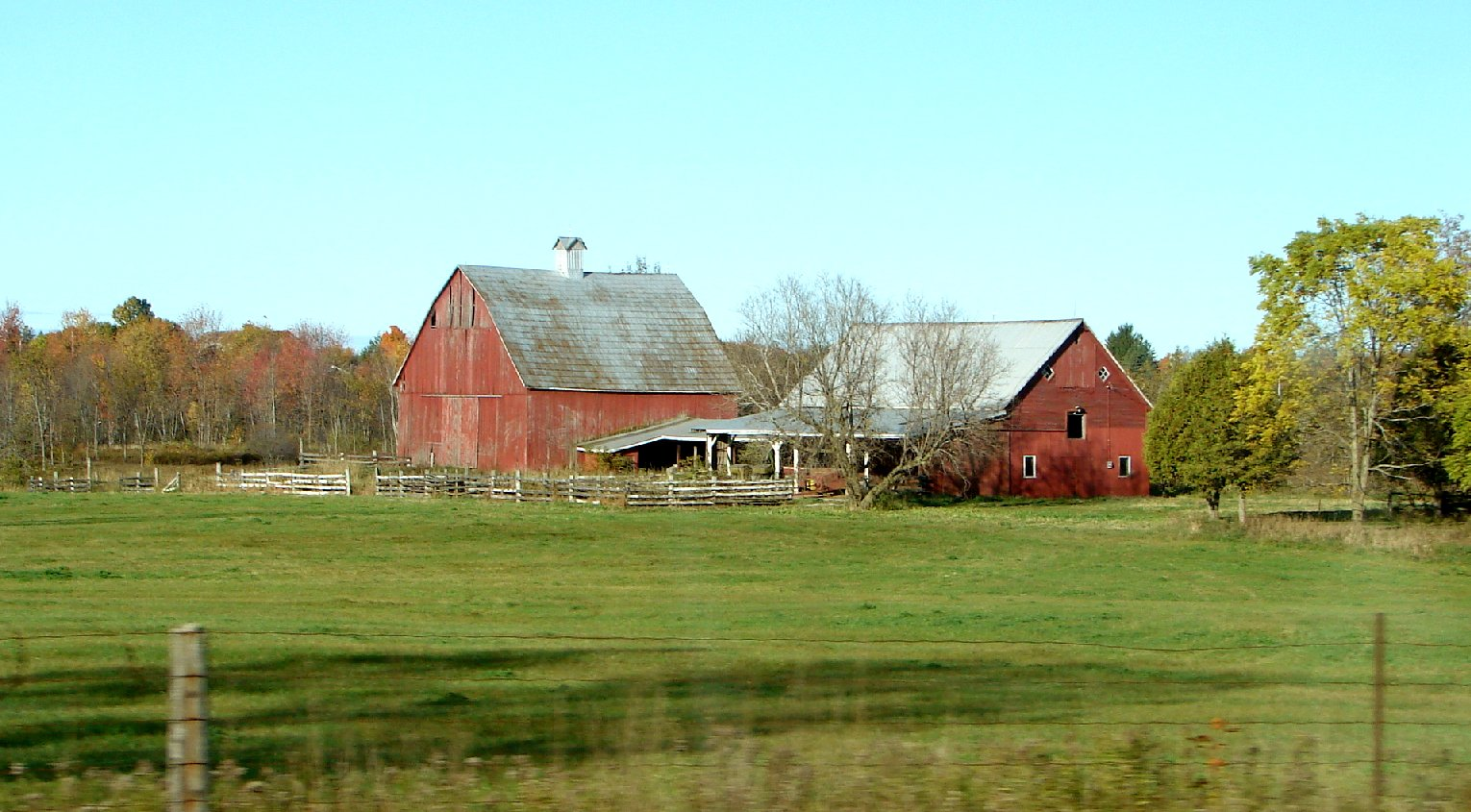
- Farm near Numogate

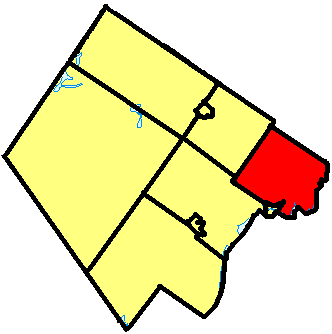
- Montague within Lanark County

- Montague within southern Ontario
- Coordinates: 44°58′N 75°58′W
- Country: Canada
- Province: Ontario
- County: Lanark

Government
  - Type: Township
  - Reeve: Karen Jennings
  - Governing Body: Montague Township Council
  - MP: Scott Reid (CPC)
  - MPP: John Jordan (PCPO)

Area
  - Land: 278.47 km^{2} (107.52 sq mi)

Population (2021)
  - Total: 3,914
  - Density: 14.1/km^{2} (37/sq mi)
- Time zone: UTC−05:00 (EST)
  - Summer (DST): UTC−04:00 (EDT)
- Area codes: 613, 343
- Website: www.township.montague.on.ca

Montague is a township in eastern Ontario, Canada, in Lanark County on the Rideau River. The township administrative offices are located on Cornelia Street East (Lanark County Road 4) east of Smiths Falls.

== Communities ==
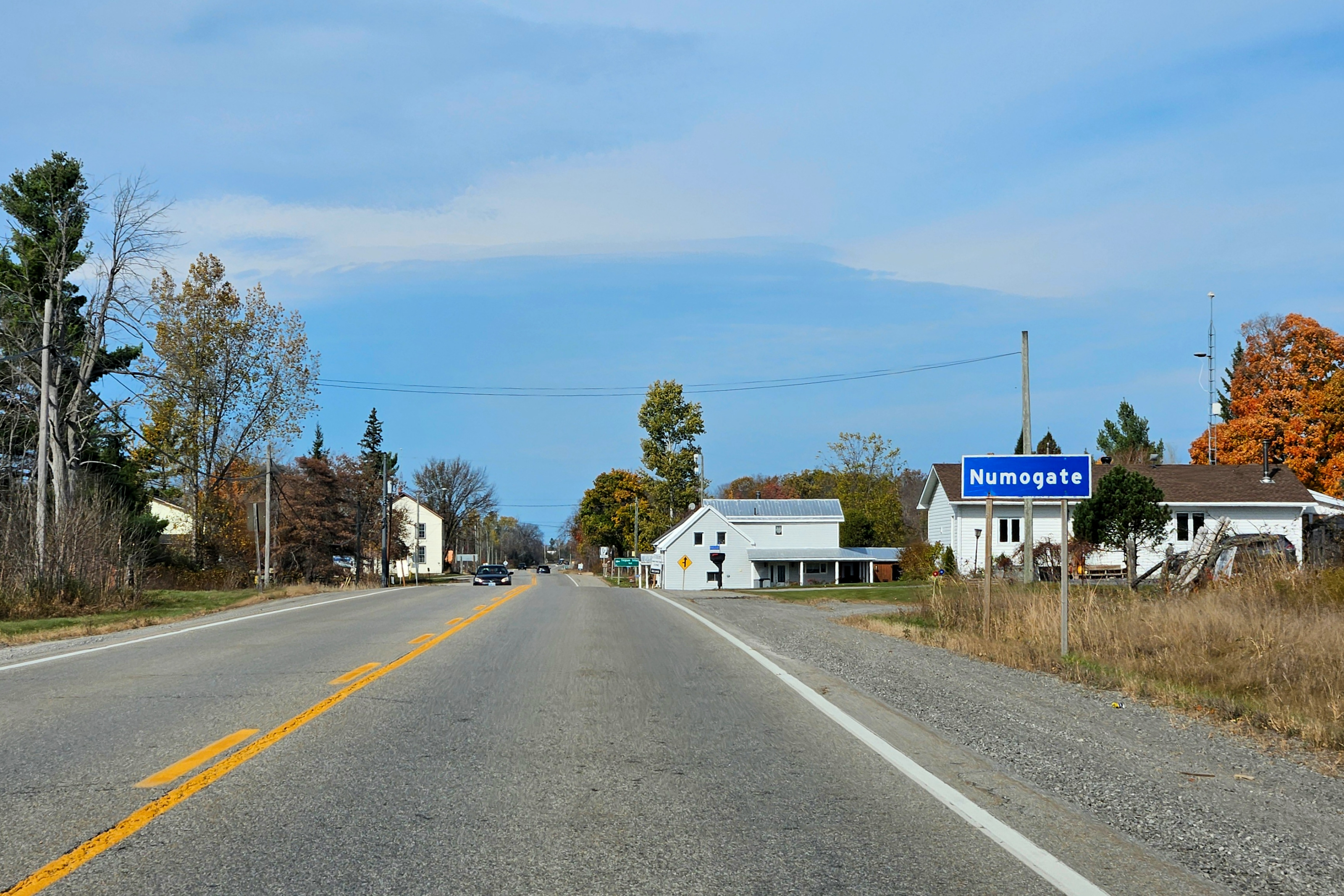
Numogate

The township comprises the communities of Andrewsville, Atironto, Kilmarnock, Nolans Corners, Numogate, Poolers Corners, Rosedale and Welsh.

== Demographics ==
In the 2021 Census of Population conducted by Statistics Canada, Montague had a population of 3,914 living in 1,503 of its 1,551 total private dwellings, a change of 4.1% from its 2016 population of 3,761. With a land area of 278.47 km^{2} (107.52 sq mi), it had a population density of 14.1/km^{2} (36.4/sq mi) in 2021.

Canada census – Montague community profile

	2021	2016	2011
Population	3,914 (+4.1% from 2016)	3,761 (+8.0% from 2011)	3,483 (+8.5% from 2006)
Land area	278.47 km^{2} (107.52 sq mi)	279.66 km^{2} (107.98 sq mi)	279.74 km^{2} (108.01 sq mi)
Population density	14.1/km^{2} (37/sq mi)	13.4/km^{2} (35/sq mi)	12.5/km^{2} (32/sq mi)
Median age	44.4 (M: 44.8, F: 44.0)	43.6 (M: 42.2, F: 41.2)
Private dwellings	1,551 (total) 1,503 (occupied)	1,489 (total)	1,389 (total)
Median household income	$98,000	$74,923

References: 2021 2016 2011

Historical census populations – Montague, Ontario

Year	Pop.	±%
1871	3,187	—
1881	2,683	−15.8%
1891	2,232	−16.8%
1901	2,058	−7.8%
1911	1,839	−10.6%
1921	1,792	−2.6%
1931	1,642	−8.4%
1941	1,547	−5.8%

Year	Pop.	±%
1951	2,222	+43.6%
1956	3,583	+61.3%
1961	4,654	+29.9%
1966	4,687	+0.7%
1971	4,459	−4.9%
1976	3,669	−17.7%
1981	3,689	+0.5%
1986	3,668	−0.6%

Year	Pop.	±%
1991	3,620	−1.3%
1996	3,802	+5.0%
2001	3,671	−3.4%
2006	3,595	−2.1%
2011	3,483	−3.1%
2016	3,761	+8.0%
2021	3,914	+4.1%

Population counts are not adjusted for boundary changes.
Source: Statistics Canada

== Transportation ==
The main roads in the township are the east–west County Road 43 which used to be Highway 43, the north–south Ontario Highway 15, and the northeast-southwest County Road 4 known locally within Montague and Smiths Falls as Cornelia Street East. The Rideau Trail passes through the township between Merrickville and Smiths Falls.

The Smiths Falls-Montague Airport is also located in Montague.

== See also ==
- List of townships in Ontario
