= Murphys Point Provincial Park =

Provincial park in Ontario, Canada

- IUCN category II (national park)
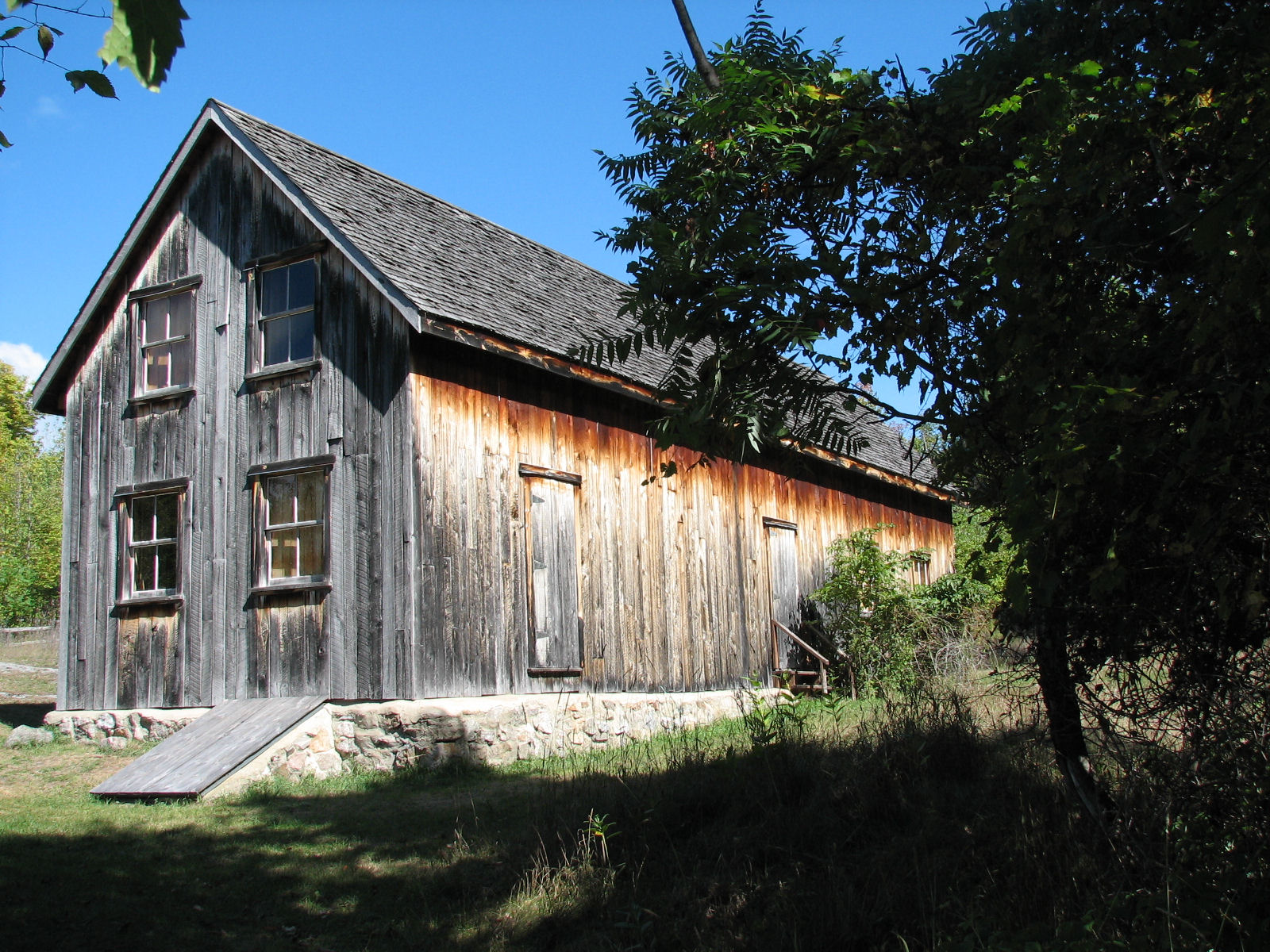
- Bunkhouse, Silver Queen Mine

- Location within Southern Ontario
- Interactive map of Murphys Point Provincial Park
- Location: Tay Valley, Ontario, Canada
- Nearest city: Perth, Ontario
- Coordinates: 44°46′N 76°13′W
- Area: 1,238.78 ha (4.7830 sq mi)
- Designation: Natural environment
- Established: 1967
- Visitors: 65,019 (in 2022)
- Governing body: Ontario Parks
- Website: www.ontarioparks.com/park/murphyspoint

Murphys Point Provincial Park is a provincial park near Perth, Ontario, Canada. The 1,239-hectare (3,060-acre) park features natural areas prepared for hiking and skiing as well as access for day-use camping and water sports at Big Rideau Lake. Facilities include a park store, visitor centre and several "comfort centres", with flush toilets, showers and laundry facilities for the multi-day camper.

The park also contains the restored early 20th-century "Silver Queen" mica mine, the ruins of a sawmill and several historic pioneer buildings including the Lally Homestead. This area was mined in the early 20th century, for mica, feldspar, and apatite. During the summer season, guided tours are offered to visitors who would like to see the inside of a pioneer-style mine. Lantern-lit evening ghost walks to the mine are also offered.

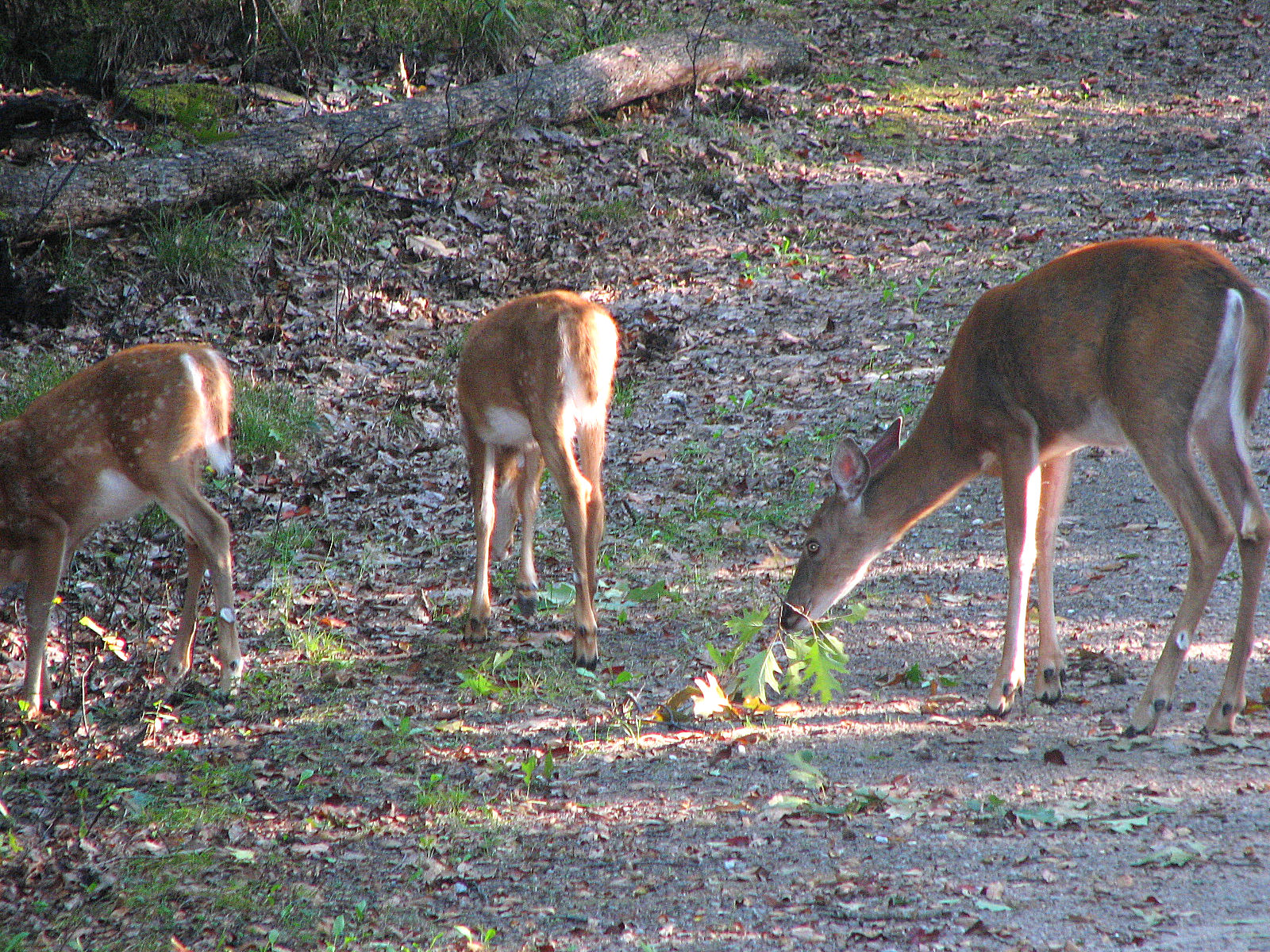
White-tailed deer (Odocoileus virginianus), doe and two fawns, Murphys Point Provincial Park

The park includes five nature trails varying in length from the 1-kilometre (0.62 mi) Loon Lake Trail to the 6.5-kilometre (4.0 mi) Rideau Trail. The park is home to a variety of mammals, including deer, fox, mink, beaver, coyote, porcupine and otter. Many loons inhabit Big Rideau Lake along with five species of turtles, eight species of amphibians, and eight species of snakes, including Canada's largest, but harmless, black rat snake.
