= Mississippi Mills, Ontario =

Mississippi Mills
- Municipality (lower-tier)
- Municipality of Mississippi Mills
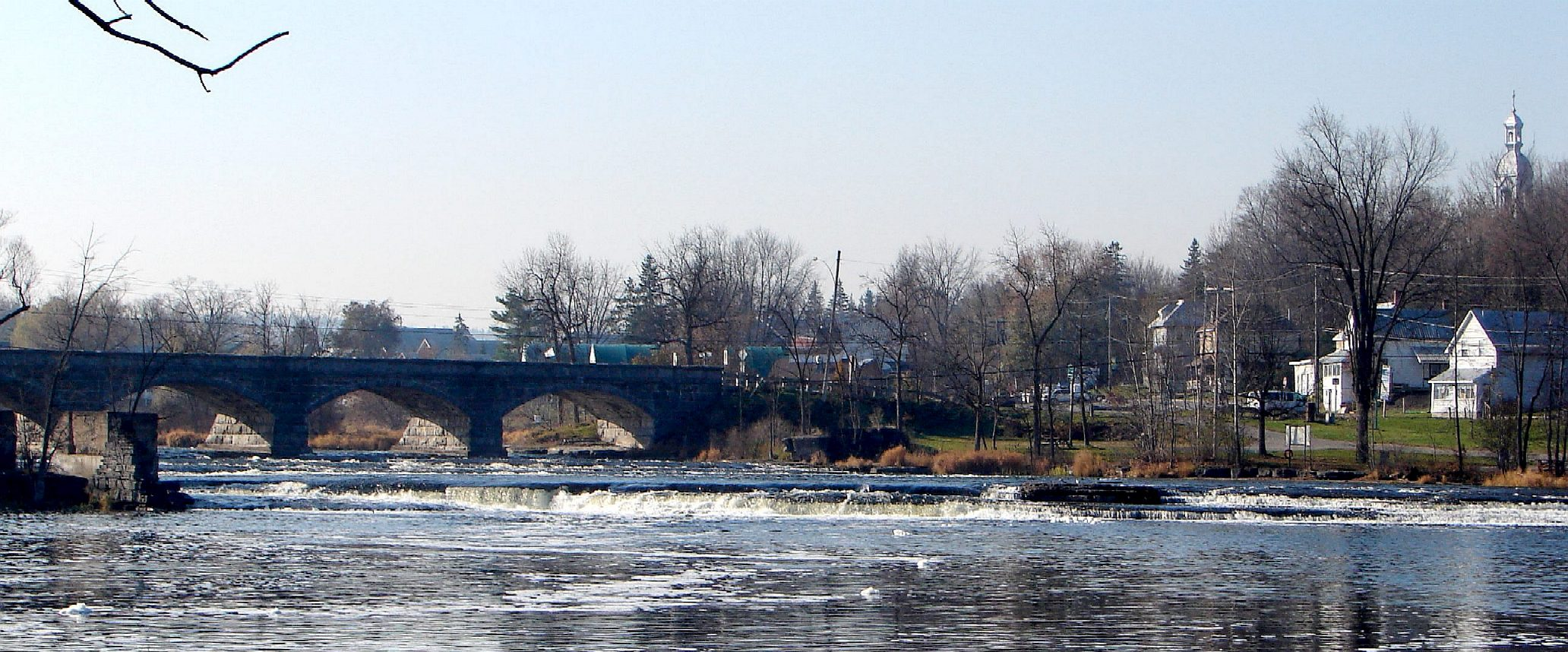
- Pakenham

- Flag Coat of arms

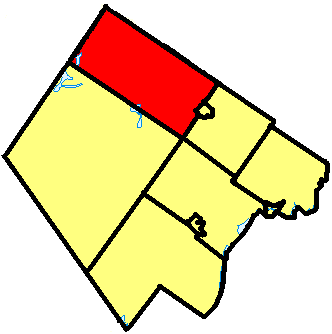
- Mississippi Mills within Lanark County

- Mississippi Mills in Southern Ontario
- Coordinates: 45°13′N 76°12′W
- Country: Canada
- Province: Ontario
- County: Lanark
- Settled: 1810s
- Formed: January 1, 1998

Government
  - Type: Municipality
  - Mayor: Christa Lowry
  - Governing Body: Mississippi Mills Council
  - MP: Scott Reid (CPC)
  - MPP: John Jordan (PCO)

Area
  - Land: 511.25 km^{2} (197.39 sq mi)

Population (2021)
  - Total: 14,740
  - Density: 28.8/km^{2} (75/sq mi)
- Time zone: UTC−05:00 (EST)
  - Summer (DST): UTC−04:00 (EDT)
- Postal code FSA: K0A
- Area code: 613
- Website: www.mississippimills.ca

Mississippi Mills is a municipality in eastern Ontario, Canada, in Lanark County. The Mississippi River flows through its territory. The municipality administrative offices are located in Ramsay and Almonte.

== History ==
The Municipality of Mississippi Mills was incorporated on January 1, 1998, when the Township of Pakenham, the Township of Ramsay, and the Town of Almonte were amalgamated.

== Communities ==
The municipality comprises the communities of:

- Almonte
- Appleton
- Bennies Corners
- Blakeney
- Cedar Hill
- Clayton
- Galbraith
- McCrearys
- Montgomery Park
- Pakenham
- Ramsay
- Snedden
- The Tannery
- Uneeda
- Union Hall

Many of the communities in Mississippi Mills were settled along the shores of the Mississippi River where the natural falls provided an opportunity to harness the water power to operate the mills.

=== Almonte ===
Settled in 1816, Almonte was one of the principal wool manufacturing towns of the Ottawa Valley. Formerly a separate municipality, the town located along the Mississippi River, has had many name changes: Shepherd's Falls, Shipman's Mills, Ramsayville, Waterford and then Almonte after a Mexican general.

=== Appleton ===
A former mill town, Appleton was settled in the 1820s along the Mississippi River in the former Ramsay Township. The town once included a sawmill, gristmill and a woolen mill.

=== Bennies Corners ===
Bennie’s Corners was a small village located at the junction of the eighth line of Ramsay and Bennies Corners Road, on land where James Bennie settled in 1821. Most of the hamlet was destroyed by fire in the summer of 1851, and when rebuilt it had little more than a post office and general store, a few residences, a school and some trades with a population of about fifty people. In 1874, the area post office was moved from Bennies Corners to Blakeney in 1874.

=== Blakeney ===
Located on the Blakeney Road, the community was first settled in 1821 at rapids along the Mississippi River. It was originally known as Norway Pine Falls, Snedden’s Mills and Rosebank, before being formally named Blakeney in 1865.

=== Cedar Hill ===
The village of Cedar Hill was first called Upper Pakenham and was built around the first school and once had a small population with two sawmills, two churches and a school. The village is located at the intersection of Cedar Hill Side Road and the 7th Concession in the former Pakenham Township.

=== Clayton ===
Founded by Edward Bellamy in 1824, it was first named Bellamy’s Mills, Clifton and then finally named Clayton in 1858 for postal reasons. The hamlet is located at the intersection of Tatlock Road and Bellamy Mills Road, on the shore of Clayton Lake, a local recreational area.

=== Galbraith ===
The area of Galbraith is located at Rae Road and Concession 5 in the former Ramsay Township. It was named after Daniel Galbraith, a Member of the Provincial Parliament, and later Member of Parliament, who owned the surrounding land which he had purchased in 1855. The one room Galbraith School, S.S. No. 5 Ramsay, was on a half acre of land at the top of the hill, which Mr. Galbraith had sold to the school trustees in 1870 for $1.00. He also gave land for a second school in 1875 on the opposite side of the road. The school operated until 1969 when the Government of Ontario mandated the consolidation of county schools and bussed students to either Almonte or Carleton Place.

=== McCrearys ===
Among the first settlers of the area was the McCreary family in 1823. McCrearys was located on Concession 3, Lot 3 in the former Ramsay Township. Joseph McCreary gave the land for the first school, on which "McCreary School" was erected. This one was torn down and a new one was erected in 1871. The community was known for the McCreary Cheese Factory, located on the road south of Highway 7.

=== Montgomery Park ===
Located along the Montgomery Park Road next to the Mississippi River.

=== Pakenham ===
Pakenham, formally established in 1823, is known for the nearby Mount Pakenham, a popular skiing location, and the five-arch stone bridge crossing the Mississippi River. Built in 1901, it is the only five-arch stone bridge in North America. The community itself is named for a brother-in-law to the Duke of Wellington, Major-General Sir Edward Pakenham, who was killed near the Mississippi River in the southern United States commanding British forces at the Battle of New Orleans in 1815.

== Demographics ==
In the 2021 Census of Population conducted by Statistics Canada, Mississippi Mills had a population of 14,740 living in 6,043 of its 6,241 total private dwellings, a change of 12% from its 2016 population of 13,163. With a land area of 511.25 km^{2} (197.39 sq mi), it had a population density of 28.8/km^{2} (74.7/sq mi) in 2021.

Canada census – Mississippi Mills community profile

	2021	2016	2011
Population	14,740 (+12.0% from 2016)	13,163 (+6.3% from 2011)	12,385 (5.5% from 2006)
Land area	511.25 km^{2} (197.39 sq mi)	519.58 km^{2} (200.61 sq mi)	519.53 km^{2} (200.59 sq mi)
Population density	28.8/km^{2} (75/sq mi)	25.3/km^{2} (66/sq mi)	23.8/km^{2} (62/sq mi)
Median age	50.0 (M: 48.0, F: 51.6)	47.9 (M: 47.0, F: 49.1)
Private dwellings	6,241 (total) 6,043 (occupied)	5,536 (total)	5,037 (total)
Median household income	$100,000	$84,173

References: 2021 2016 2011

Historical census populations – Mississippi Mills
Year	Pop.	±%
2001	11,647	—
2006	11,734	+0.7%
2011	12,385	+5.5%
2016	13,163	+6.3%
2021	14,740	+12.0%
Source: Statistics Canada

== Culture ==
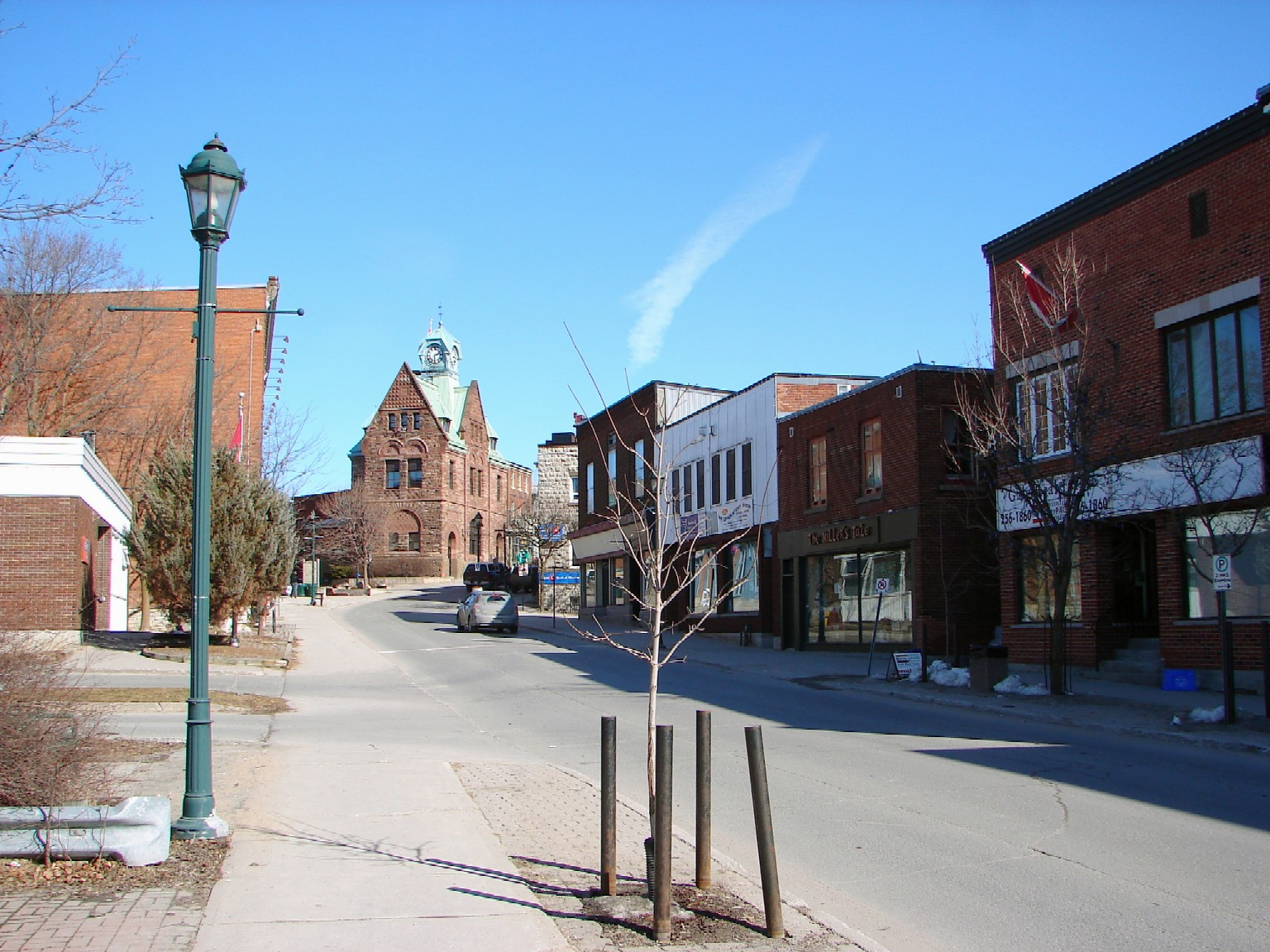
Mill Street, Almonte

Mississippi Mills is home to several festivals and events, including the North Lanark Highland Games, Naismith 3-on-3 Basketball Festival, the Almonte Fair, and CeltFest.

Many of the municipality's citizens commute to the nearby city of Ottawa. Almonte has three elementary schools: R. Tait McKenzie Public School, Naismith Memorial Public School and Holy Name of Mary Catholic School. Almonte and District High School serves the town of Almonte and much of the surrounding area.

== Hydroelectricity generation ==
The Enerdu hydro electricity generating station in Almonte

In 2010, Enerdu Power Systems Inc. purchased an existing hydro generating station on the river in Almonte; the current, upgraded station opened in 2018 and has a capacity of 1000-1300 kilowatts. There had been older power stations in the flour mill, with the first one having opened in 1890; a series of owners had operated the facilities over the decades, producing various amounts of electricity. The Brian J. Gallagher Generating Station station, operated by the Mississippi River Power Corporation, is a 4.6 MW facility that came online in 2010; it replaced a nearby 1925 station and offers double the capacity.

== See also ==
- List of townships in Ontario
- Joseph Yuill
