= Mississippi River (Ontario) =

Tributary of the Ottawa River in Ontario, Canada

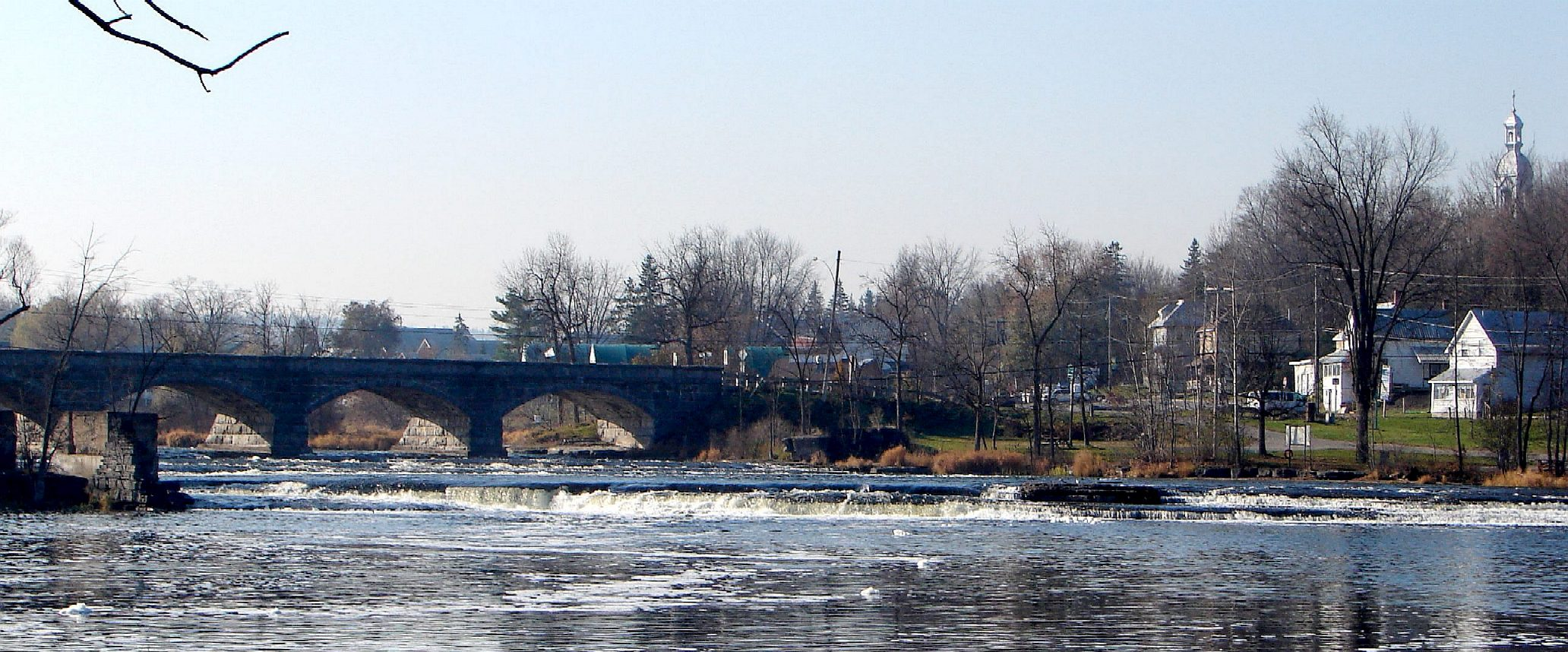
- Mississippi River with 5-arch stone bridge at Pakenham

- Location within Southern Ontario

Location
- Country: Canada
- Province: Ontario

Physical characteristics
- Source: Mackavoy Lake
  - location: Effingham Township, Addington Highlands, Lennox and Addington County
  - elevation: 269 m (883 ft)
- Mouth: Lac des Chats on the Ottawa River
  - location: Ottawa
  - coordinates: 45°26′29″N 76°17′07″W
  - elevation: 71 m (233 ft)
- Length: 200 km (120 mi)
- Basin size: 4,450 km^{2} (1,720 sq mi)
- Discharge
  - average: 40 m^{3}/s (1,400 cu ft/s)

Basin features
- Progression: Ottawa River→ St. Lawrence River→ Gulf of St. Lawrence
- River system: Ottawa River drainage basin

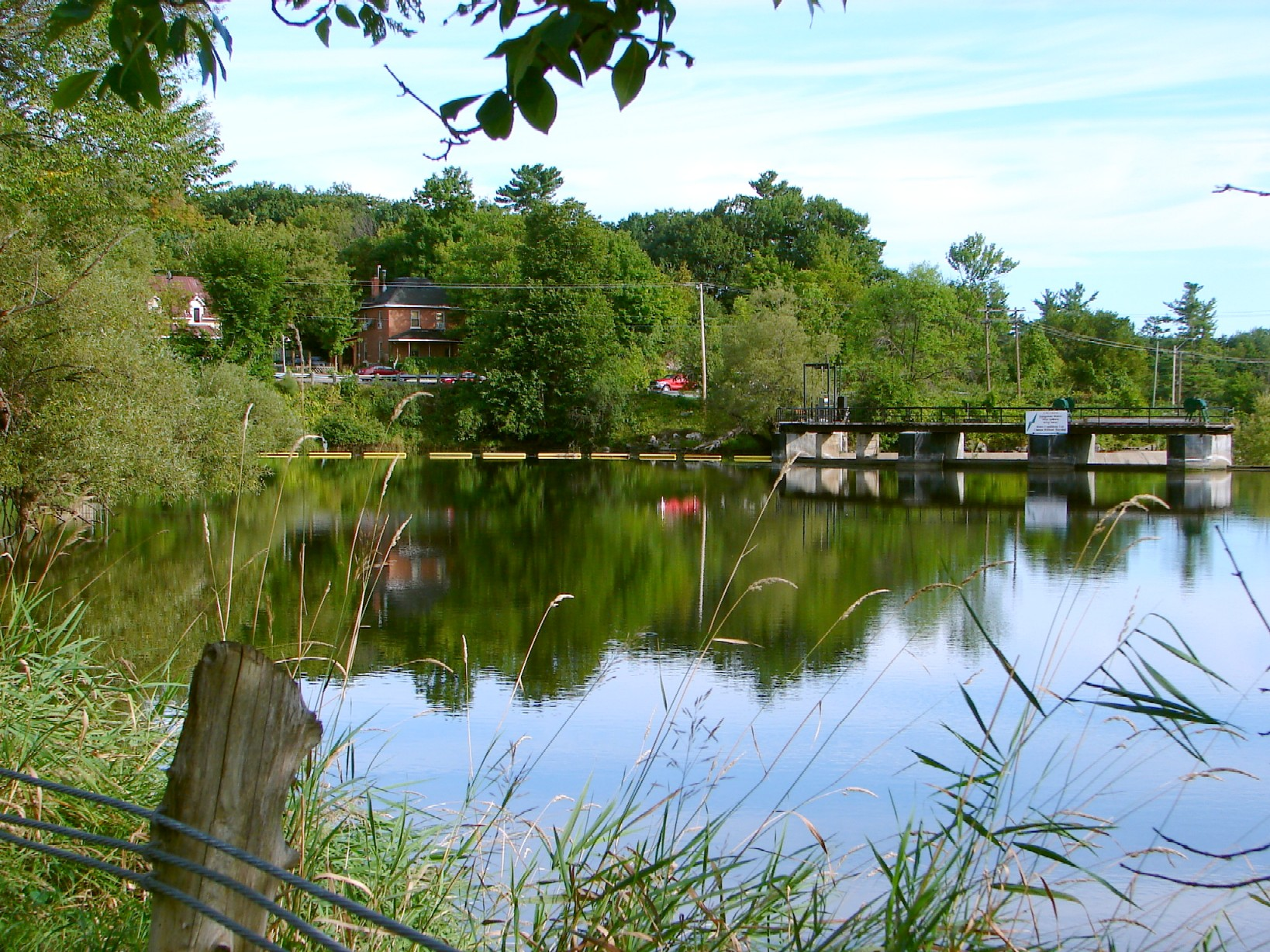
The Mississippi River at Galetta

The Mississippi River is a tributary of the Ottawa River in Eastern Ontario, Canada, which has no geographic relation with the Mississippi River in the United States. It is 200 kilometres (120 mi) in length from its source at Mackavoy Lake, has a drainage area of 4,450 square kilometres (1,720 sq mi), and has a mean discharge of 40 cubic metres per second (1,400 cu ft/s). There are more than 250 lakes in the watershed.

Communities along the river include the village of Lanark, the towns of Carleton Place, Mississippi Mills (including towns of Almonte and Pakenham), and Galetta. Here it enters the Ottawa River.

== Etymology ==
The river's name is likely derived from its proximity to the nearby Kichisìpi (Ottawa River), meaning 'Great River' in Anicinàbemowin (the Algonquin language). The Misi-ziibi ('Big River') is a minor tributary of the Kichisìpi and the largest river in the area. Alternatively, the name may originate from Mazinaa[bikinigan]-ziibi, Algonquian for '[painted] image river', referring to the pictographs found on Mazinaw Lake, though this is by no means proven. According to the Algonquins of Ontario, the river's name is S'ni'miko'bi meaning 'beaver creek'.

== Description ==
From its headwaters at Mackavoy Lake to its confluence at the Ottawa River near Fitzroy Harbour, the river drops 200 metres (660 ft) in elevation. It begins on the Canadian Shield (mostly gneiss and marble), and then, after Carleton Place, flows through limestone and clay plains. At Carleton Place, there are rapids with limestone cliffs. This area supports the largest stand of hackberry trees in the region.

Most of the upper landscape is temperate deciduous forest dominated by sugar maple, American beech, and red oak. At one time, the forests had much more eastern hemlock, but this was logged out to produce bark for the tanning industry. Now, large hemlock stands are uncommon. Most forests are less than a century old.

The irregular terrain of the upper watershed is produced by the remnants of an ancient mountain chain, the Grenville Mountains, which arose on the supercontinent of Rodinia more than a billion years ago. These mountains have since been eroded to mostly gneiss and marble hills, with occasional outcrops of granite. Lower in the watershed, there are younger limestone rocks. Most of these are covered by clay deposited when this area was covered by the Champlain Sea.

Occasional large wetlands occur along the river. One of the largest is the Innisville Wetlands, a provincially significant wetland that is also designated an Area of Natural and Scientific Interest. Another large wetland is the Appleton Silver Maple Swamp. These wetlands depend upon the seasonal cycles of the river. High water periods in the spring flood large areas creating wetland soils and large areas of marsh. As water levels slowly fall, conditions suitable for swamp forests occur. This natural seasonal alternation between high and lower water levels is essential for creating the natural diversity of wetlands along the river.

Upstream, in Lanark County, there are two sections of the river that are important for their plant communities. The first section of interest includes the east end of Dalhousie Lake and the swamp- and marsh-lined portion of the Mississippi River from the lake almost to Sheridans Rapids. Shallow lakes and adjacent river make up the provincially significant McCullochs Mud Lake Wetland. The second portion of interest is the rocky, rapid-filled section of the river from Sheridans Rapids down to just past Playfairville. Here there are small populations of unusual species including Parnassia glauca (Grass-of-parnassus), Platanthera flava (Tubercled Orchid) and Spiranthes lucida (Shining Ladies'-tresses).

Downstream, where the Mississippi enters the Ottawa River, there are several important shorelines and wetlands, including the Mississippi Snye, which has a rich aquatic flora over marble bedrock, and has recorded observations for the musk turtle.

The river originally powered textile mills. Today, it provides hydroelectric power. Such power dams, however, have all but eliminated American eels from the river. These eels were once an abundant source of food for aboriginal populations, as well as providing a source of food for great blue herons, otters, and other animals.

There are many important natural areas along the river. Purdon Conservation Area supports Canada's largest native colony of showy lady slipper orchids, comprising about 16,000 plants. The Carleton Place Hackberry stand, and the Innisville Wetlands, have both been mentioned above. In drier areas, there are several provincially significant alvars, limestone plains with exposed rock and many rare plants. These include the Burnt Lands Alvar and the Panmure Alvar.

The river has a surprising diversity of turtles, including painted turtles, snapping turtles, Blanding's turtles, musk turtles and map turtles. The last four are considered species at risk, probably because nesting beaches have been degraded by human settlement.

== Tributaries ==
- Clyde River
- Indian River
- Fall River
- Bell's Creek

== See also ==
- List of Ontario rivers
