= Almonte, Ontario =

Almonte
- Community
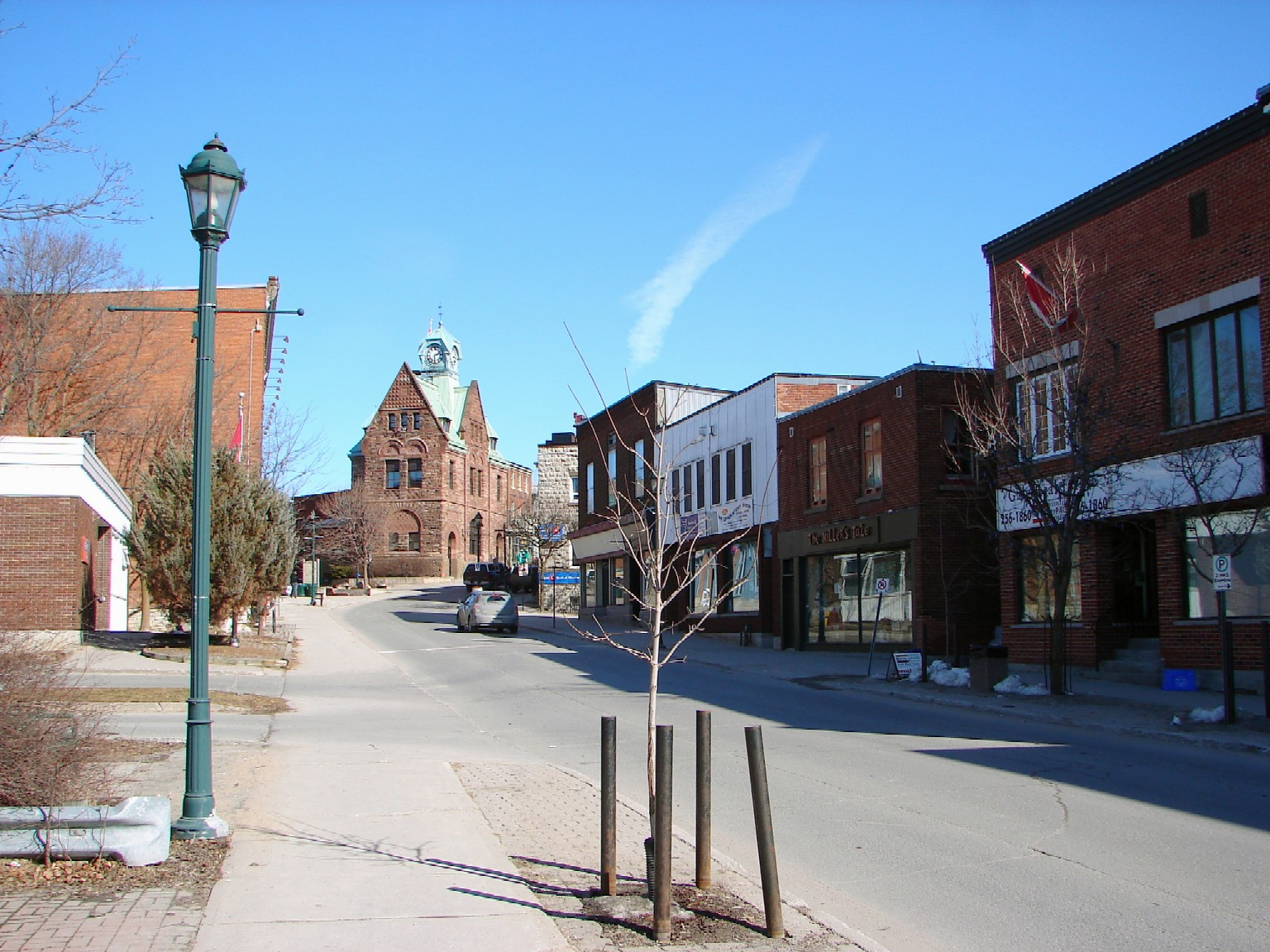

- Location within Ontario Almonte (Southern Ontario)
- Coordinates: 45.22629°N 76.19452°W
- Country: Canada
- Province: Ontario
- County: Lanark
- Municipality: Mississippi Mills
- Established: 1818
- Incorporated: 1871
- Dissolved (amalgamated): 1998
- Named for: Juan Almonte

Government
  - Fed. riding: Lanark—Frontenac—Kingston
  - Prov. riding: Lanark—Frontenac—Kingston

Area
  - Land: 4.16 km^{2} (1.61 sq mi)

Population (2021)
  - Total: 6,098
  - Density: 1,466.6/km^{2} (3,798/sq mi)
- Time zone: UTC-5 (EST)
  - Summer (DST): UTC-4 (EDT)
- Postal Code: K0A 1A0 & K0A 4A0
- Area code: 613
- Website: almonte.com

Almonte (/ˈælmɒnt/ AL-mont; Spanish: [alˈmonte]) is a former mill town in Lanark County, in the eastern portion of Ontario, Canada. Formerly a separate municipality, Almonte is a ward of the town of Mississippi Mills, which was created on January 1, 1998, by the merging of Almonte with Ramsay and Pakenham townships. Almonte is 46 kilometres (29 mi) south-west of downtown Ottawa. Its population as recorded in the 2021 Canadian Census was 6,098.

The Mississippi River runs through Almonte currently powering two hydro electricity generating stations.

== History ==
=== European settlement ===
Almonte's first European-bred settler was David Shepherd, who in 1818 was given 200 acres (0.81 km^{2}) by the Crown to build and operate a mill on the Mississippi River. The site became known as Shepherd's Falls. That name was never official, however, and Shepherd sold his patent after his mill burned down. The patent's buyer, Daniel Shipman, rebuilt the mill and the settlement became known as Shipman's Mills by about 1821.

Most of Shipman's Mills' early settlers were Scottish and later Irish. A textile town almost from the start, by 1850 it was the home of seven busy woollen mills. It was one of the leading centres in Canada West for the manufacture of woollen cloth. The construction of a railway line to Brockville stimulated the economic growth of Almonte. During this time of rapid expansion, the town changed its name from Shipman's Mills to Ramsayville, and then to Waterford.

In 1869, Almonte was a village with a population of 2,000 on the Mississippi River in the Township of Ramsay, County of Lanark. It was a station of the Brockville and Ottawa Railway. By the 1870 the town had thirty stores and forty other businesses. Almonte was incorporated as a village in 1871, and was incorporated as a town in 1880.

On 10 September 1909 the town suffered a major fire, which destroyed several buildings on the main street and caused $75,000 worth of damage.

=== Origin of the name Almonte ===
When, in 1855, the newly created Canadian post office pointed out there was already a Waterford in Canada West, the town needed another name change.

Relations between the United States and Great Britain had been antagonistic since the Revolutionary War and later the War of 1812. Border wars between Mexico and the United States in the 1830s increased this antagonism. Mexican general Juan Almonte had fought honourably in these latter wars, and by 1853 he had become Mexico's ambassador to the United States.

In the ensuing climate of Canadian mistrust of US territorial ambitions, General Almonte's name would have been well known to Waterford's citizens. Though there is no decisive evidence as to the final motive for the name change, it appears likely that Waterford saw Almonte as a "principled David fighting a Goliath interested in swallowing up all North America."

The proposed name change was accepted by the Combined Counties of Lanark and Renfrew in June 1855, although the post office did not record the new name until 1859. Whenever the name may have been formally accepted, it led to Almonte being the only community in Ontario, and likely Canada, to be named for a Mexican general.

=== Almonte train wreck, 1942 ===
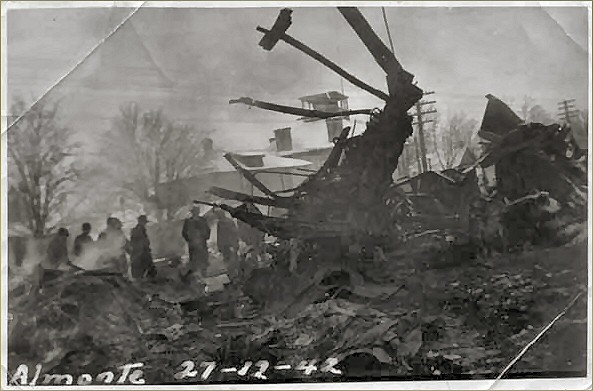
Almonte train wreck, 1942

Almonte was the site of one of the worst rail disasters in Canadian history. On December 27, 1942, a troop train rear-ended a passenger train standing in the local railway station. Thirty-nine people were killed and more than 150 were injured. A local genealogy page provides photos and a contemporary newspaper report of the wreck.

=== Present day ===
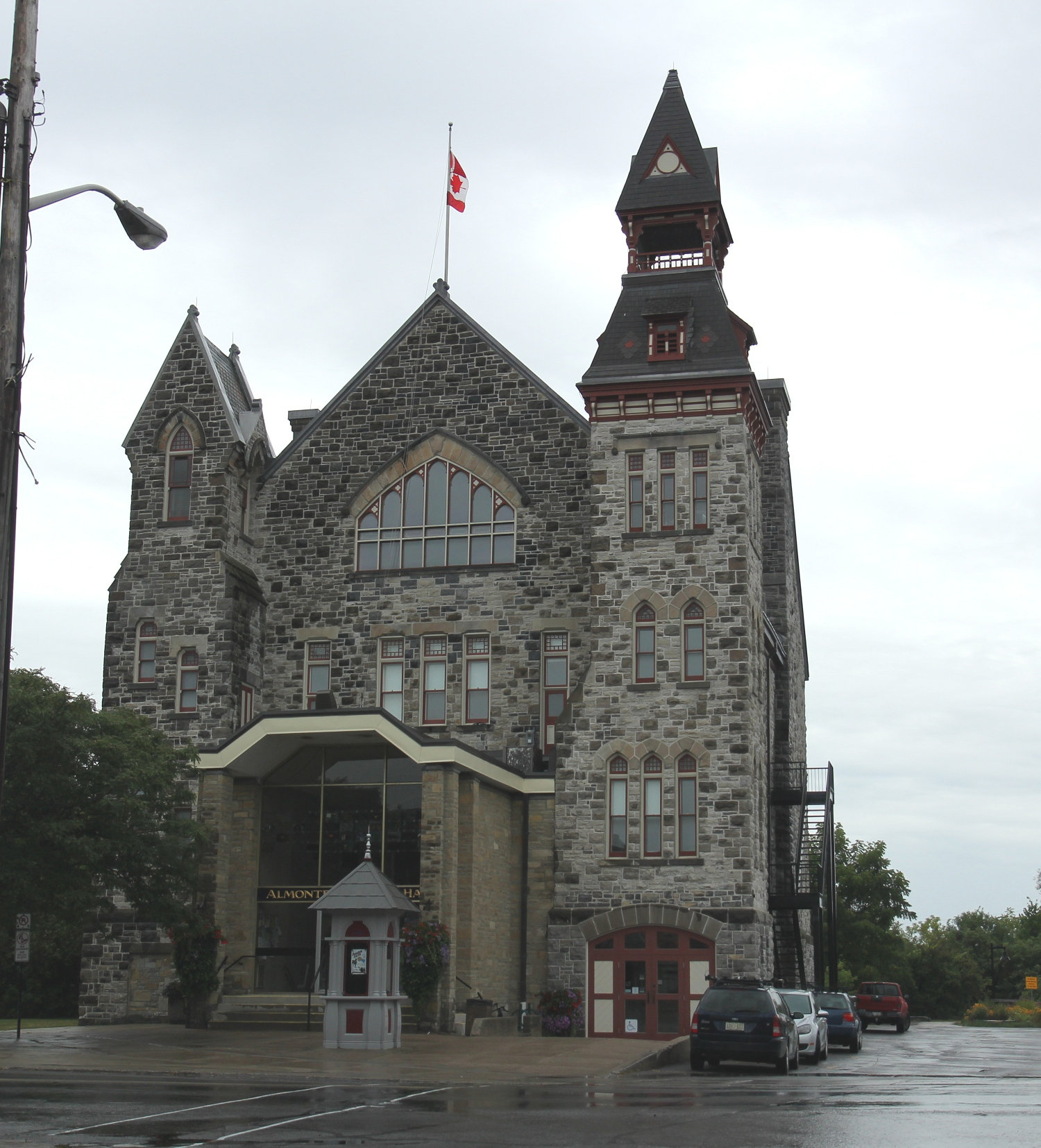
The Old Town Hall in Almonte

After the last textile mill closed in the early 1980s, Almonte no longer had a dominant industry. It has since turned its attention towards tourism. It offers museums and several historical spots, such as the home of James Naismith, the inventor of basketball, and the Mississippi Valley Textile Museum.

Almonte retains much of its 19th-century architecture. The former Almonte post office, designed in 1889 by Thomas Fuller (the architect of the Parliament Buildings), and the Rosamond Woollen Mill, the largest 19th-century textile mill in Canada, are both designated as National Historic Sites of Canada.

Almonte has a skate park and a splash pad which are open to the public, beside the arena.

The Enerdu hydro electricity generating station

In 2010, Enerdu Power Systems Inc. purchased an existing hydro generating station on the river; the current, upgraded station opened in 2018 and has a capacity of 1000-1300 kilowatts. There had been older power stations in the flour mill, with the first one having opened in 1890; a series of owners had operated the facilities over the decades, producing various amounts of electricity. The Brian J. Gallagher Generating Station station, operated by the Mississippi River Power Corporation, is a 4.6 MW facility that came online in 2010; it replaced a nearby 1925 station and offers double the capacity.

== Demographics ==
Historical census populations – Almonte, Ontario

Year	Pop.	±%
1871	2,080	—
1881	2,684	+29.0%
1891	3,068	+14.3%
1901	3,023	−1.5%
1911	2,452	−18.9%
1921	2,426	−1.1%
1931	2,415	−0.5%
1941	2,543	+5.3%

Year	Pop.	±%
1951	2,672	+5.1%
1956	2,960	+10.8%
1961	3,267	+10.4%
1966	3,556	+8.8%
1971	3,696	+3.9%
1976	3,711	+0.4%
1981	3,855	+3.9%
1986	4,122	+6.9%

Year	Pop.	±%
1991	4,382	+6.3%
1996	4,611	+5.2%
2001	4,649	+0.8%
2006	4,528	−2.6%
2011	4,752	+4.9%
2016	5,039	+6.0%
2021	6,098	+21.0%

Population figures after 1998 are for Almonte population centre. Population counts are not adjusted for boundary changes.
Source: Statistics Canada

== Movie locations ==
Movies have been filmed partially or entirely in Almonte in recent years, including several Christmas movies. The New York Times said of the town that "with its mix of 19th-century historic buildings and a ’50s diner, Almonte in Ontario has been the go-to location for holiday movies set in Vermont, Alaska and even Milwaukee."

Almonte featured in a 2022 episode of Murdoch Mysteries, though the episode was not actually filmed in Almonte.

== Events and attractions ==
=== Festivals ===
Almonte is home to several festivals and events, including the North Lanark Highland Games, Naismith 3-on-3 Basketball Festival, Almonte Celtfest and Busfusion.

==== North Lanark Highland Games ====
The North Lanark Highland Games have been held annually in Almonte since 1982.

The Games feature traditional Highland sports and entertainment, and bring in about 6,000 visitors each summer.

==== Almonte Celtfest ====
The Almonte Celtfest has been held annually in Almonte's Gemmill Park since 1997. The festival's goal is to "celebrate and promote the Celtic heritage of the Ottawa Valley through music and dance."

==== Puppets Up! ====
The popular Puppets Up! festival, which shut down in 2017 after a 12-year run, was revived in August 2022. Noreen Young was the festival's creative director.

== Schools ==
Almonte has three elementary schools:

- R. Tait McKenzie Public School
- Naismith Memorial Public School
- Holy Name of Mary Catholic School

Almonte and District High School serves the town of Almonte and much of the surrounding rural area. The Almonte campus of the T.R. Leger School provides adult education and literacy classes.

== Notable people ==
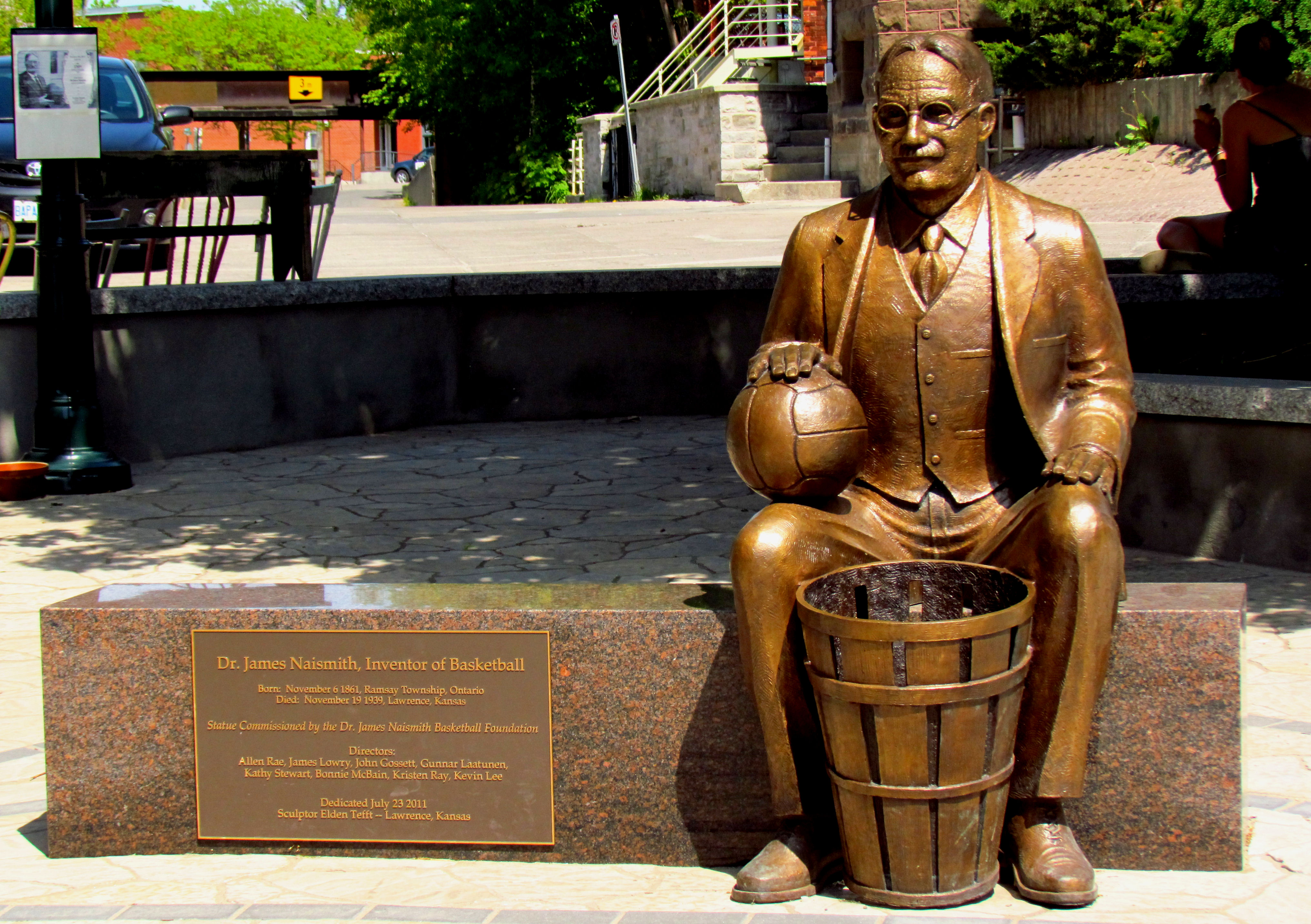
Statue of James Naismith, the inventor of basketball, on Mill Street in Almonte, Ontario

- Robert Tait McKenzie, Canadian Physician, soldier (physiotherapy), sculptor
- Perianne Jones, Olympic athlete
- James Naismith, inventor of basketball
- Noreen Young, puppeteer and television producer

== See also ==
- List of unincorporated communities in Ontario
