= Lac des Chats =

Lake in Ontario and Quebec, Canada

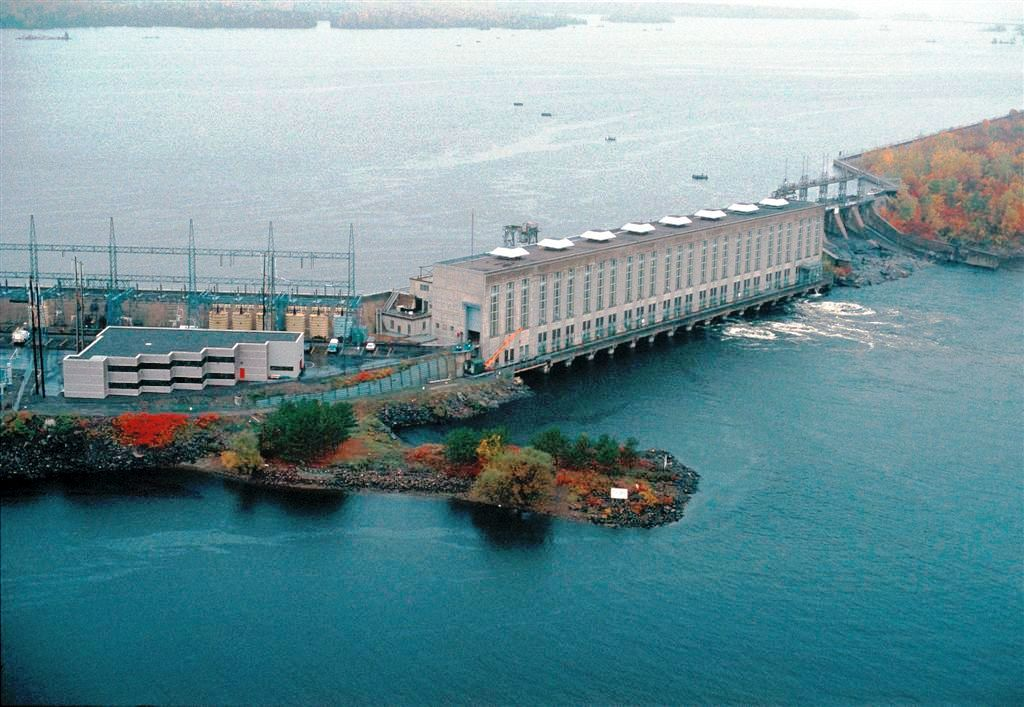

- Location within Ontario
- Location: Ontario / Quebec, Canada
- Coordinates: 45°31′02″N 76°29′37″W
- Type: artificial
- Primary inflows: Ottawa River
- Primary outflows: Ottawa River
- Basin countries: Canada
- Settlements: Arnprior, Ontario

Lac des Chats (English: Lake of Cats), commonly known as Chats Lake, is a lake on the Ottawa River which forms part of the boundary between the provinces of Ontario and Quebec (Canada). It is formed by the Chats Falls Dam and serves as the reservoir for the Chats Falls Generating Station. Most of the lake is located in Pontiac Regional County Municipality, Quebec, and in Renfrew County, Ontario, but the easternmost part (near the dam) lies in Ottawa, Ontario and in Les Collines-de-l'Outaouais Regional County Municipality, Quebec.

== See also ==
- List of lakes in Ontario
