= Lanark County =

County in Ontario, Canada

- County (upper-tier)
- County of Lanark
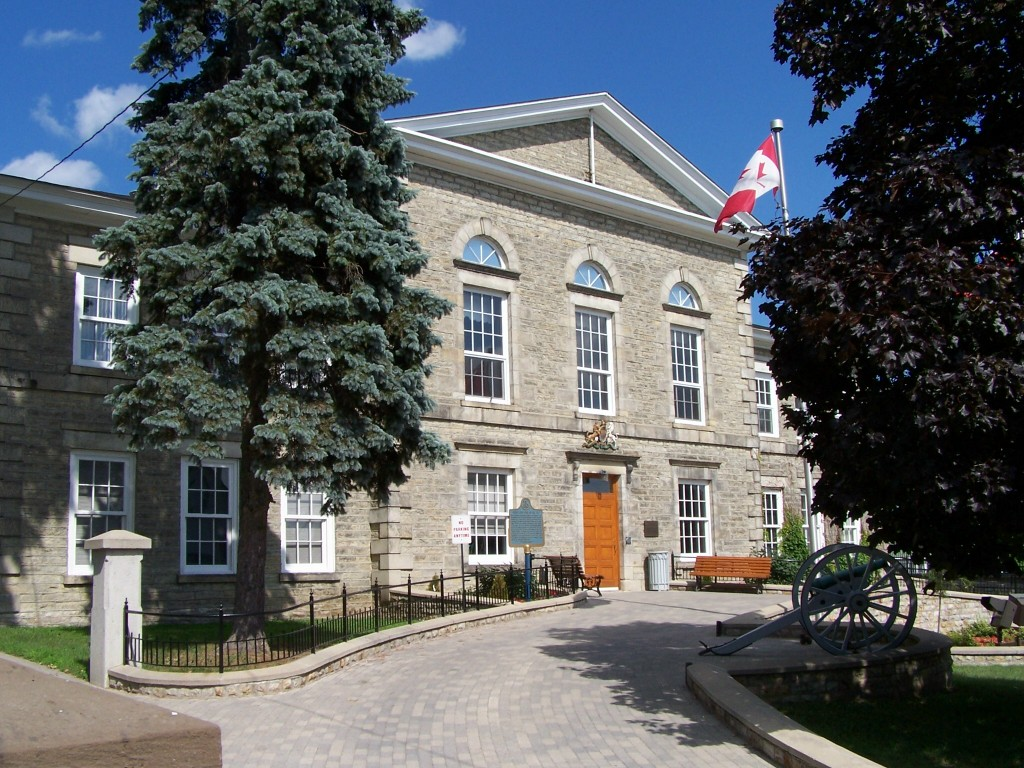
- Lanark County Courthouse in Perth

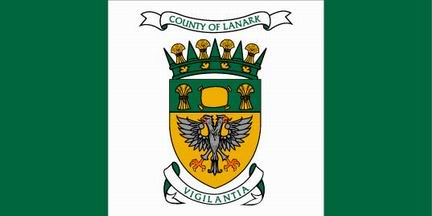
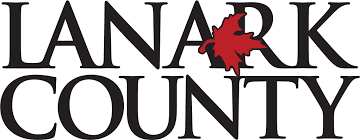
- Flag Logo
- Nickname: The Maple Syrup Capital of Ontario
- Motto: Vigilance
- Location of Lanark County
- Coordinates: 45°00′N 76°15′W
- Country: Canada
- Province: Ontario
- Region: Eastern Ontario
- Established: 1824
- County seat: Perth
- Municipalities: List: Beckwith (township); Carleton Place (town); Drummond/North Elmsley (township); Lanark Highlands (township); Mississippi Mills (town); Montague (township); Perth (town); Tay Valley (township)

Area
  - Land: 2,977.05 km^{2} (1,149.45 sq mi)
  - Census division: 2,986.71 km^{2} (1,153.18 sq mi)
- Land area excludes Smiths Falls

Population (2021)
  - Total: 66,506
  - Density: 22/km^{2} (57/sq mi)
  - Census division: 75,760
  - Census division density: 25.4/km^{2} (66/sq mi)
- Total excludes Smiths Falls
- Time zone: UTC-5 (EST)
  - Summer (DST): UTC-4 (EDT)
- Website: www.lanarkcounty.ca

Lanark County is a county and census division located in the Canadian province of Ontario. Its county seat is Perth, which was first settled in 1816 and was known as a social and political capital before being overshadowed by a city known today as Ottawa.

Most European settlements of the county began in 1816, when Drummond, Beckwith and Bathurst townships were named and initially surveyed. The first farm north of the Rideau was cleared and settled somewhat earlier, in 1790. The county took its name from the town of Lanark in Scotland. Nearly all the townships were named after British public and military figures from the era of early settlement.

== History ==
=== Bathurst District ===
In 1824, Lanark County was severed from Carleton County in Bathurst District, and it consisted of the following townships and lands:

Lanark County (1824)
- Bathurst
- Drummond
- Beckwith
- Dalhousie
- Lanark
- Ramsay
- Darling
- Lavant
- North Sherbrooke
- South Sherbrooke

together with all the unsurveyed lands within the District of Bathurst, and such Islands in the Ottawa River as are wholly or in greater part opposite to the said townships and unsurveyed land

When Carleton was withdrawn from the District in 1838, Renfrew County was severed from part of Lanark, but the two remained united for electoral purposes. By 1845, all lands in the District had been surveyed into the following townships:

Counties comprising Bathurst District (1845)
Lanark	Renfrew
Bathurst; Beckwith; Drummond; Dalhousie; Darling; North Elmsley (Note: transferred from Leeds County in 1838); North Burgess; Lavant; Lanark; Montague (Note: transferred from Grenville County in 1838); Ramsay; North Sherbrooke; South Sherbrooke	Admaston; Blithefield; Bagot; Bromley; Horton; McNab; Pakenham (Note: transferred from Carleton County in 1838); Pembroke; Ross; Stafford; Westmeath

In 1851, the township of Pakenham was transferred from Renfrew to Lanark.

=== United Counties of Lanark and Renfrew ===
Effective January 1, 1850, Bathurst District was abolished, and the "United Counties of Lanark and Renfrew" replaced it for municipal and judicial purposes. The counties remained united for electoral purposes in the Parliament of the Province of Canada, referred to as the County of Lanark, until Renfrew gained its own seat in 1853.

The separation of Renfrew from Lanark began in 1861, with the creation of a Provisional Municipal Council that held its first meeting in June 1861. The United Counties were dissolved in August 1866.

=== Current constituent municipalities ===
Municipality	Constituted from	Map
Beckwith	Beckwith	Lanark County Municipalities
Carleton Place (town)		Lanark County Municipalities
Drummond/North Elmsley	Drummond; North Elmsley	Lanark County Municipalities
Lanark Highlands	Dalhousie; Darling; Lanark; Lavant; North Sherbrooke	Lanark County Municipalities
Mississippi Mills (town)	Almonte; Pakenham; Ramsay	Lanark County Municipalities
Montague	Montague	Lanark County Municipalities
Perth (town)		Lanark County Municipalities
Tay Valley	Bathurst; North Burgess; South Sherbrooke	Lanark County Municipalities

Smiths Falls is a separated town and is for municipal purposes not part of the county. It is mostly located in Lanark, while its southern part was annexed from the United Counties of Leeds and Grenville.

== Geography ==
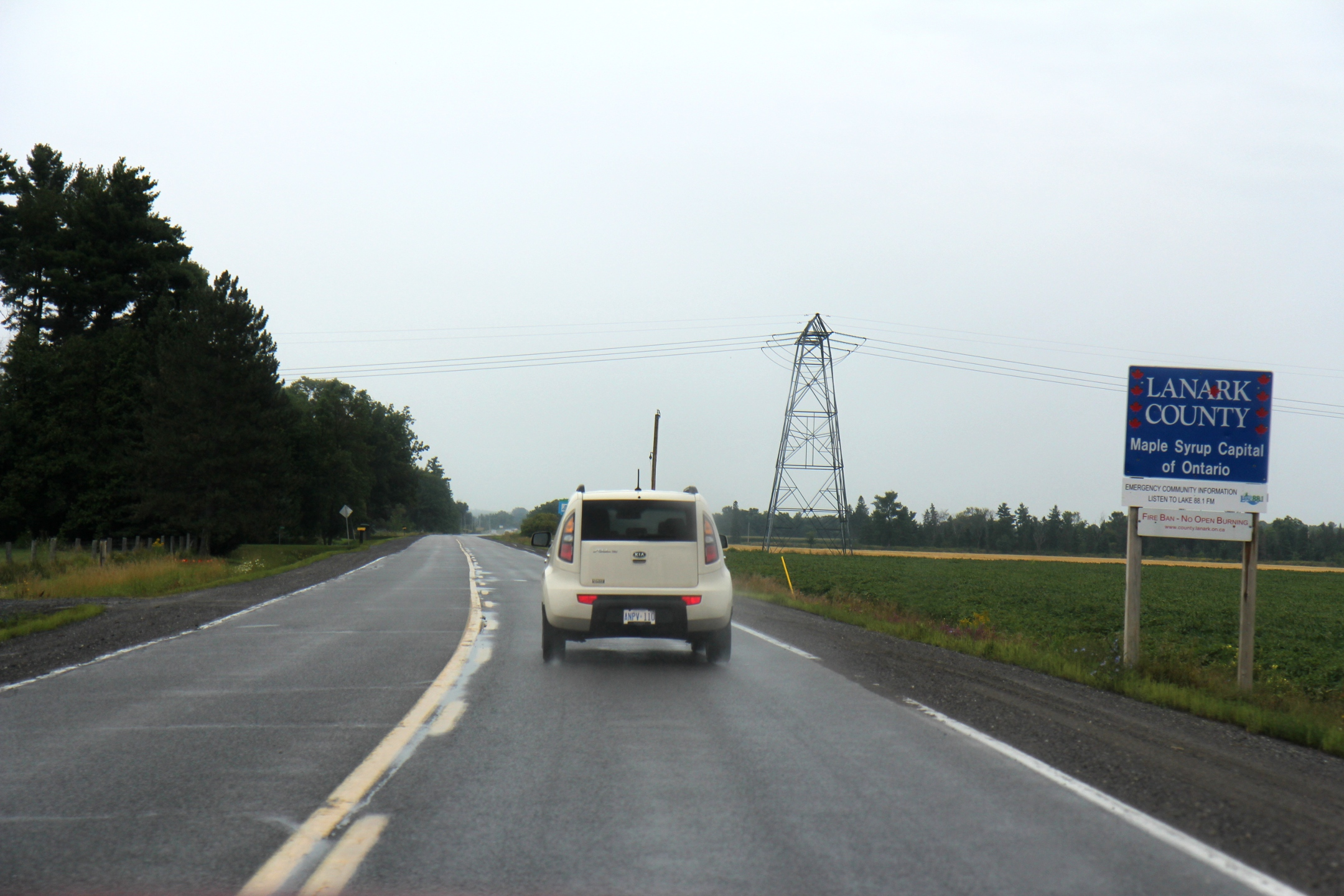
The sign for Lanark County on County Road 29

The county is located in the sub-region of Southern Ontario named Eastern Ontario. Geologically, the northern part of the county is in the Canadian Shield and the southern part is in the Great Lakes Basin. The county has two large rivers, the Mississippi and Rideau, each of which empty into the Ottawa River. The landscape is varied including Canadian Shield (with gneiss, granite and marble) as well as limestone plains, with a variety of tills, sands and clays left from the melting of glaciers in the last ice age.

At the time of settlement, most of the county was covered in temperate deciduous forest; the dominant forest trees included maple, hemlock, oak and beech. Some of the higher ridges in the west of the county were likely once natural fire barrens, with a distinctive fauna and flora. The clearance of forests began with early settlement, at which time one of the important exports from the area was potash, made from the ashes of the trees burned in clearing.

The natural diversity of the landscape supports over 1,200 species of plants in the county flora. Seventeen areas have been documented as outstanding examples of plant diversity; these include Blueberry Mountain, Burnt Lands Alvar, Clay Bank Alvar, Christie Lake, Murphy's Point Provincial Park and Almonte Town Park. The county also has 47 provincially significant wetlands. Some of the largest are Blueberry Marsh (north of Perth), the Innisville Wetlands (upstream of Mississippi Lake) and the Goodwood Marsh south of Carleton Place. In addition to David White's list of 17 areas of plant diversity, Paul Keddy lists 17 special places in the county. Both lists have the Burnt Lands Alvar, the Christie Lake Barrens and Murphy's Point Provincial Park. Keddy's list adds areas such as Playfairville Rapids, Lavant/Darling Spillway and the Carleton Place Hackberry stand. Also of interest is an old shoreline which crosses the county diagonally, approximately from Almonte in the northeast to Perth in the southwest. This shoreline was formed about 12,000 years ago near the end of the last ice age when much of the Ottawa Valley was inundated by the Champlain Sea. Many areas below this old shoreline are flat clay plains, with occasional outcrops of gneiss or limestone ridges.

Some of the distinctive southern animals in the county include five-lined skinks (Ontario's only species of lizard), Central ratsnakes and southern flying squirrels. Unusual southern plants include arrow arum, a nationally rare wetland plant found near Mississippi Lake. The south-facing cliffs over Big Rideau Lake, including Foley Mountain, have a slightly warmer climate, and therefore support an unusual southern flora including shagbark hickory, tall cinquefoil (Potentilla arguta) and a rare fern, blunt-lobed woodsia. Cliff Bennett provides a list of 26 routes for canoe and kayak exploration of the county.

== Demographics ==
From the census division in the 2021 Census of Population conducted by Statistics Canada, Lanark County had a population of 75,760 living in 31,909 of its 35,441 total private dwellings, a change of 10.3% from its 2016 population of 68,698. With a land area of 2,986.71 km^{2} (1,153.18 sq mi), it had a population density of 25.4/km^{2} (65.7/sq mi) in 2021.

Canada census – Lanark census division community profile

	2021	2016	2011
Population	75,760 (+10.3% from 2016)	68,698 (+4.6% from 2011)	65,667 (+3.0% from 2006)
Land area	2,986.71 km^{2} (1,153.18 sq mi)	3,035.64 km^{2} (1,172.07 sq mi)	3,033.82 km^{2} (1,171.36 sq mi)
Population density	25.4/km^{2} (66/sq mi)	22.6/km^{2} (59/sq mi)	21.6/km^{2} (56/sq mi)
Median age	48.8 (M: 47.2, F: 50.4)	48.2 (M: 47.0, F: 49.2)
Private dwellings	35,441 (total) 31,909 (occupied)	32,695 (total) 28,580 (occupied)	31,361 (total)
Median household income	$88,000	$71,660

Notes: Includes Smiths Falls
References: 2021 2016 2011

Historical census populations – Lanark County

Year	Pop.	±%
1921	32,993	—
1931	32,856	−0.4%
1941	33,143	+0.9%
1951	35,601	+7.4%
1956	38,025	+6.8%
1961	40,313	+6.0%

Year	Pop.	±%
1966	41,212	+2.2%
1971	42,259	+2.5%
1976	44,197	+4.6%
1981	45,676	+3.3%
1986	49,649	+8.7%
1991	54,803	+10.4%

Year	Pop.	±%
1996	59,845	+9.2%
2001	62,945	+5.2%
2006	63,785	+1.3%
2011	65,667	+3.0%
2016	68,698	+4.6%
2021	75,760	+10.3%

Population counts are not adjusted for boundary changes.
Source: Statistics Canada

== Economy ==
The county is one of the top centres of maple syrup production in Ontario and describes itself as "The Maple Syrup Capital of Ontario".

== Recreation ==
There are two provincial parks in Lanark County: Murphy's Point Provincial Park on Big Rideau Lake and Silver Lake Provincial Park along Highway 7 near the west end of the county. The Rideau Trail and Trans-Canada Trail both go through Lanark County. There are also several conservation areas run by the Mississippi Valley Conservation Authority, the Rideau Valley Conservation Authority, and the Mississippi Madawaska Land Trust. The K&P rail trail goes through the northwest corner of the county.

== See also ==
- List of townships in Ontario
- List of secondary schools in Ontario#Lanark County

== Bibliography ==
- Sargeant, Robert (1993), Some early Lanark County marriages, Kingston, Ontario: Kingston Branch, Ontario Genealogical Society
