= Tay Valley =

- Township (lower-tier)
- Township of Tay Valley
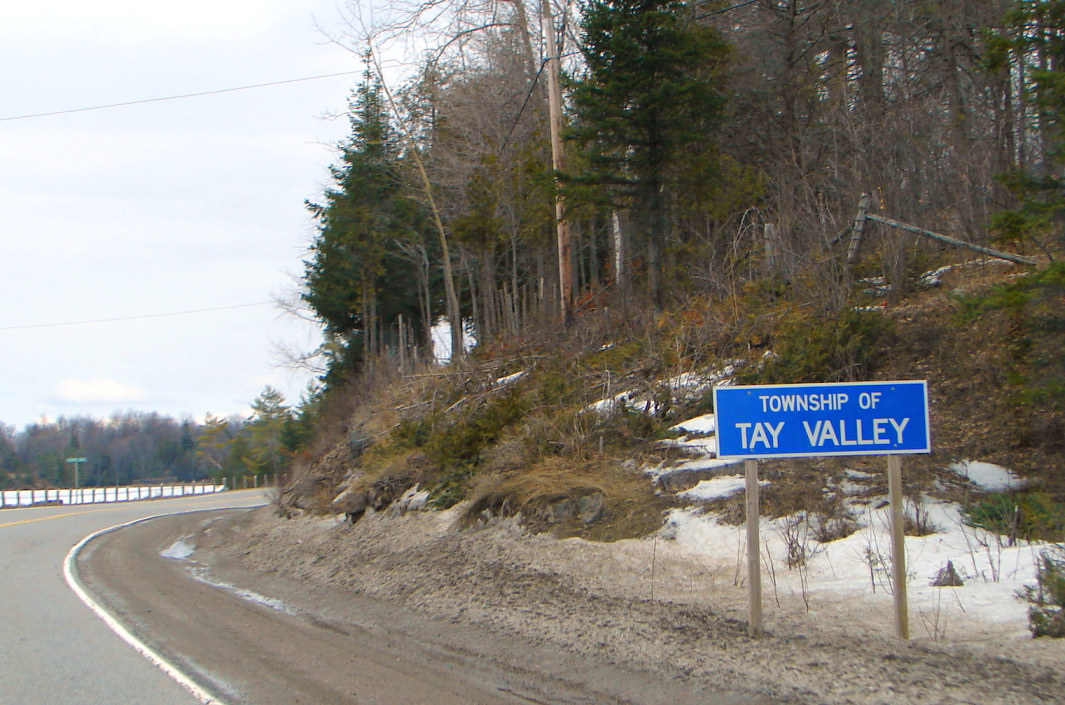
- Road sign along Highway 7

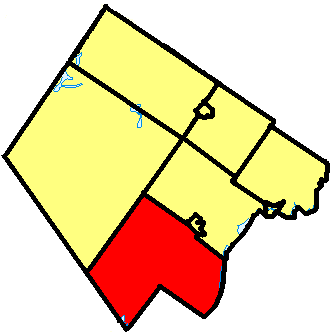
- Tay Valley within Lanark County

- Location within Southern Ontario
- Coordinates: 44°52′N 76°23′W
- Country: Canada
- Province: Ontario
- County: Lanark
- Settled: 1810s
- Incorporated: January 1, 1998

Government
  - Type: Township
  - Reeve: Rob Rainer
  - Gov. Body: Tay Valley Township Council
  - Federal riding: Lanark—Frontenac—Lennox and Addington
  - Prov. riding: Lanark—Frontenac—Lennox and Addington

Area
  - Land: 528.67 km^{2} (204.12 sq mi)

Population (2021)
  - Total: 5,925
  - Density: 11.2/km^{2} (29/sq mi)
- Time zone: UTC-5 (EST)
  - Summer (DST): UTC-4 (EDT)
- Area codes: 613, 343
- Website: www.tayvalleytwp.ca

Tay Valley is a township in eastern Ontario, Canada, on the Tay River in the southwest corner of Lanark County, adjacent to the United Counties of Leeds and Grenville and Frontenac County. The township administrative offices are located in Glen Tay.

== History ==
At the time of European settlement in North America, the area of the township was under the control of the Omàmiwininì, an Algonquin people. The constituent townships (Bathurst, North Burgess, and South Sherbrooke) were surveyed and settled in the immediate aftermath of the War of 1812, with land grants provided to Canadian veterans of the war as well as Scottish and Irish immigrants. Bathurst Township was named after Henry Bathurst, 3rd Earl Bathurst, North Burgess after Thomas Burgess, and South Sherbrooke was named after John Coape Sherbrooke.

The Canadian Pacific Railway's original mainline (CP Havelock Subdivision) passed through Glen Tay heading west to Havelock then on to Toronto before being abandoned to Tweed in 1973 and to Havelock in 1987. A newer mainline was branched off west of Glen Tay southwest towards Belleville which still handles the CP Rail traffic from Smith Falls to Toronto.

The township was incorporated on January 1, 1998, when the townships of Bathurst, South Sherbrooke, and North Burgess were amalgamated. It was originally known as the Township of Bathurst Burgess Sherbrooke, but adopted the name of Tay Valley on July 30, 2002.

== Communities ==
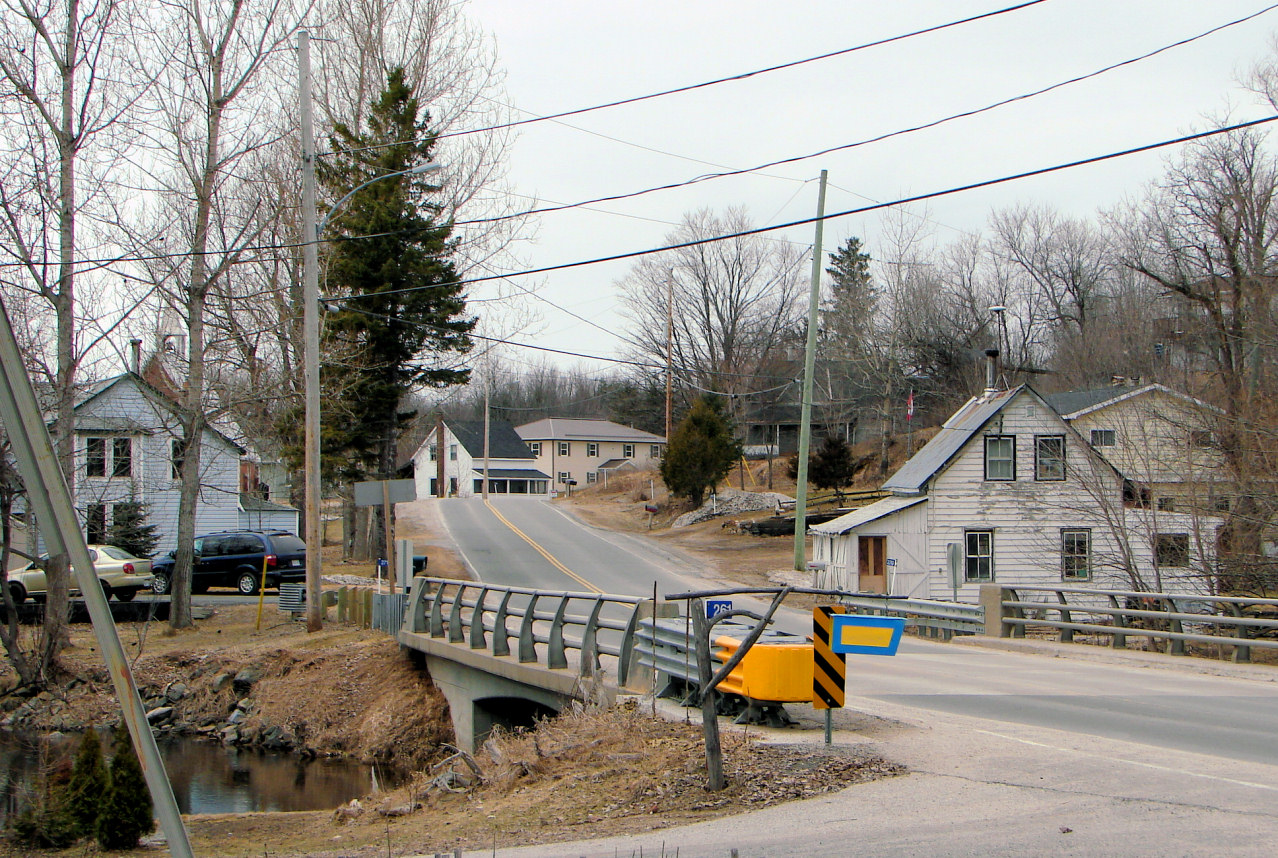
Maberly

The township comprises the communities of:

- Althorpe
- Bathurst Station
- Bells Corners
- Bolingbroke
- Bolingbroke Siding
- Brooke
- Christie Lake
- DeWitts Corners
- Elliot
- Fallbrook
- Feldspar
- Glen Tay
- Harper
- Maberly
- Playfairville
- Pratt Corners
- Scotch Line
- Stanleyville
- Wemyss

The permanent population was 5,925 in the 2021 census. However, similar to adjacent townships, there are also numerous seasonal residents, predominantly cottagers from Ottawa or Kingston. The total population including seasonal residents was estimated over 10,000, in 3,843 households in 2012.

== Demographics ==
In the 2021 Census of Population conducted by Statistics Canada, Tay Valley had a population of 5,925 living in 2,419 of its 3,750 total private dwellings, a change of 4.6% from its 2016 population of 5,665. With a land area of 528.67 km^{2} (204.12 sq mi), it had a population density of 11.2/km^{2} (29.0/sq mi) in 2021.

Canada census – Tay Valley community profile

	2021	2016	2011
Population	5,925 (+4.6% from 2016)	5,665 (+1.7% from 2011)	5,571 (-1.1% from 2006)
Land area	528.67 km^{2} (204.12 sq mi)	550.01 km^{2} (212.36 sq mi)	549.12 km^{2} (212.02 sq mi)
Population density	11.2/km^{2} (29/sq mi)	10.3/km^{2} (27/sq mi)	10.1/km^{2} (26/sq mi)
Median age	57.2 (M: 57.2, F: 57.2)	54.5 (M: 54.3, F: 54.6)
Private dwellings	3,750 (total) 2,419 (occupied)	3,689 (total)	3,698 (total)
Median household income	$90,000	$77,686

References: 2021 2016 2011

Historical census populations – Tay Valley, Ontario
Year	Pop.	±%
1996	5,180	—
2001	5,440	+5.0%
2006	5,634	+3.6%
2011	5,571	−1.1%
2016	5,665	+1.7%
2021	5,925	+4.6%
Source: Statistics Canada

Mother tongue (2021):

- English as first language: 93.7%
- French as first language: 2.7%
- English and French as first language: 0.6%
- Other as first language: 2.8%

== Transportation ==
The main roads in the township are Highway 7 and Lanark County Road 10. The Rideau Trail passes through the township, including Murphys Point Provincial Park.

== See also ==
- List of townships in Ontario
