= Peterson Creek =

Peterson Creek may refer to one of the following rivers:

In Canada

- Peterson Creek (Cataraqui River), in Frontenac and Leeds and Grenville counties, Ontario
- Peterson Creek (Clyde River), in Frontenac and Lanark counties, Ontario

In the United States

- Peterson Creek (San Mateo County, California)
- Peterson Creek (South Branch Little Wolf River tributary), a stream in Wisconsin
