= Bobs Lake (North Frontenac) =

- Location of Bobs Lake in Ontario.
- Location: North Frontenac, Frontenac, Ontario, Canada
- Coordinates: 45°05′23″N 76°46′11″W
- Type: Lake
- Part of: Saint Lawrence River drainage basin
- Max. length: 580 m (1,900 ft)
- Max. width: 320 m (1,050 ft)
- Surface elevation: 264 m (866 ft)

Bobs Lake is a lake in the Saint Lawrence River drainage basin in the township of North Frontenac, Frontenac County in eastern Ontario, Canada.

The lake is about 580 metres (1,903 ft) long and 320 metres (1,050 ft) wide, lies at an elevation of 264 metres (866 ft), and is located about 10 kilometres (6 mi) northeast of the community of Ompah on the decommissioned Ontario Highway 509. The primary inflow is Peterson Creek at the southwest, and the primary outflow is also Peterson Creek at the northwest, which flows to the South Branch Clyde River and via the Mississippi River and Ottawa River to the Saint Lawrence River.

== See also ==
- List of lakes in Ontario
