= Peterson Creek (Clyde River tributary) =

- Location of the mouth of Peterson Creek in southern Ontario

Location
- Country: Canada
- Province: Ontario
- Region: Eastern Ontario
- Counties: Lanark; Frontenac
- Townships: Lanark Highlands; North Frontenac

Physical characteristics
- Source: Unnamed lake
  - location: North Frontenac, Frontenac County
  - coordinates: 45°04′48″N 76°46′50″W
  - elevation: 292 m (958 ft)
- Mouth: South Branch Clyde River
  - location: Lanark Highlands, Lanark County
  - coordinates: 45°06′29″N 76°41′47″W
  - elevation: 189 m (620 ft)
- Length: 9.5 km (5.9 mi)

Basin features
- River system: Ottawa River drainage basin

Peterson Creek is a river in the Ottawa River drainage basin in Lanark Highlands, Lanark County and North Frontenac, Frontenac County in eastern Ontario, Canada. It flows 9.5 kilometres (5.9 mi) from and unnamed lake to its mouth at the South Branch Clyde River.

== Course ==
Peterson Creek begins at an unnamed lake in North Frontenac township at an elevation of 292 metres (958 ft) about 9 kilometres (6 mi) northwest of the community of Ompah. It flows east to Cruse Lake, then turns northeast and passes through Bobs Lake, takes in an unnamed left tributary arriving from Mountain Lake, and reaches Chathams Lake. The creek continues northeast, passes into Lanark Highlands township, takes in an unnamed left tributary arriving from Twin Lake, and heads east. It takes in a third unnamed left tributary arriving from McIntosh Lake, and reaches its mouth at the South Branch Clyde River at an elevation of 189 metres (620 ft), about 3 kilometres (1.9 mi) southwest and upstream of the community of Clyde Forks. The Clyde River flows via the Mississippi River to the Ottawa River.

== See also ==
- List of rivers of Ontario
