= Herron's Mills =

Ghost town in Ontario, Canada

Coordinates: 45°03′01″N 76°24′10″W

Herron's Mills, originally known as Gillies Mills, is a ghost town in the municipality of Lanark Highlands, Lanark County in Eastern Ontario, Canada, near the community of Lanark. It is located on highway 511 between Perth and Calabogie, Ontario.

Businessman John Gillies established a sawmill on the Clyde River in the community in 1842 to supply lumber for construction in the area. The mill continued to operate until 1950. It was later purchased by the Herron Brothers, hence the name.

== History ==
The area around Herron's Mills, Lanark County was originally settled, starting in 1820, by Scottish immigrants from the southern areas of Scotland. Most of the Scottish who emigrated came from the over-crowded cities and areas in Scotland such as Glasgow and Lanark the town in Lanarkshire. As a result of the worldwide depression that followed the Napoleonic Wars and the rapidly encroaching Industrial Revolution, Scottish weavers found themselves out of work and destitute. Parliament heard the cry of the impoverished Scotsman, and formed colonization groups to assist those willing to immigrate to Canada. Advertisements in Scottish papers read as follows: "Persons desiring to emigrate(sic) to Canada will be conveyed free of charge. The government will also supply provisions on the voyage and on arrival, a grant of 100 acres will be allotted each family as well as to each male child on reaching 21." Promises of good conditions on the journey to Canada were also promised. Between 1820 and 1821 over 3,000 immigrants set sail to Canada and arrived in Lanark County via Quebec, Cornwall and Perth. They named their new home the Lanark Highlands after their former home in Scotland.

Herron's Mills, was originally known as Gillies Mills. The Gillies arrived in the area, that would be their namesake, in 1821 from Stirlingshire, Scotland. The family consisted of James(55), Helen Stark(43) and five of their six children: Janet(21), John(10), George(8), Helen(4) and Isabel(1). In 1839, John married Mary Cullen Bain and then he began cutting timber in 1842 on the river Clyde using a sawmill that he had crafted with his own hands. He carted the saw for the mill from Brockville over 55 miles of rough, back-country roads to cut the timber that was harvested from his father's property. Before long, the place known as Gillies Mills became known for producing square cut timber for the Quebec market and sawn lumber that was shipped to the United States via Kingston to Oswego, N.Y. The hamlet became known as a lumbering town, as many other towns, such as Balaclava were in the Ottawa Valley.

In 1866, John Gillies and Peter McLaren, now business partners, pooled resources to purchase Gilmour Mills in Carleton Place which was expanded to have the capacity to produce 100,000 feet of lumber a day and employing over 100 men. Every successful business venture ensures a steady supply of raw materials. Gilmour Mills being no exception, they held the timber rights to over 300 square miles in the hills of the Upper Mississippi region of Frontenac County. Sometime between 1871 and 1873, Gillies, with his four sons, William, James, John and David, sold their portion of the business to McLaren and John Herron and moved operations to Braeside on the Ottawa River. At this point in time, the name of the little hamlet was changed to Herron's Mills. Throughout the remainder of the 1800s the Gillies, now known as "Gillies Brothers", were one of the larger lumber producers in the Ottawa Valley. Over time, James, the eldest Gillies brother became the senior partner and president of the new company, in charge of sales, finances and general policy. James Gillies died in 1909. In 1913, the company expanded outside of Ontario and Quebec by contracting timber rights in British Columbia. Throughout the 20th Century, the Gillies family continued to work exclusively with pine, in spite of dwindling natural resources and pressures to diversify. The company was sold in 1963 to Consolidated Paper Corporation with Gillies family members retaining leadership positions in the division of Consolidated Paper that was Gillies Brothers until 1978.

In addition to timber, Herron's Mills became home to a number of various businesses that were typical of those in the region. In 1895, a cheese factory, named Clyde, was operated by James Herron in the hamlet.

== Remains ==
The lumber mill and dam are visible from Herron Mills Road.
