= Clyde River =

Clyde River may refer to:

== Rivers ==
=== Australia ===
- Clyde River (New South Wales), on the south coast of New South Wales
- Clyde River (Tasmania), in central Tasmania

=== Canada ===
- Clyde River (Alberta)
- Clyde River (Baffin Island)
- Clyde River (Ontario), in eastern Ontario

=== New Zealand ===
- Clyde River, New Zealand

=== Scotland ===
- River Clyde, a major river in Scotland

=== United States ===
- Clyde River (New York), a tributary of the Seneca River
- Clyde River (Vermont), a tributary of Lake Memphremagog

== Canadian communities ==
- Clyde River, Nova Scotia
- Clyde River, Nunavut, an Inuit hamlet
- Clyde River, Prince Edward Island, a rural municipality

== Parks ==
- Clyde River National Park, New South Wales

== See also ==
- Little Clyde River, Ontario, Canada
