= Earl Manson =

Canadian ice hockey player

- Born: April 12, 1897 Middleville, Ontario, Canada
- Died: May 31, 1976 (aged 79)
- Position: Left wing
- Shot: Left
- Played for: Seattle Metropolitans
- Playing career: 1920–1921

John Earl Manson (April 12, 1897 – May 31, 1976) was a Canadian professional ice hockey player. He played with the Seattle Metropolitans of the Pacific Coast Hockey Association.
