= Kashwakamak Lake =

Lake in Ontario, Canada

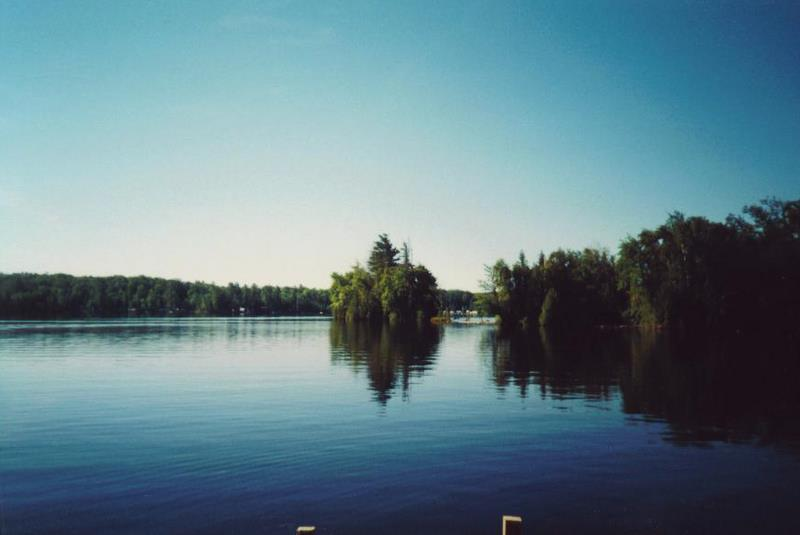

- Location within Ontario
- Location: North Frontenac, Frontenac County, Ontario
- Coordinates: 44°51′31″N 77°02′20″W
- Primary inflows: Mississippi River from Marble Lake
- Primary outflows: Mississippi River to Mud Lake
- Basin countries: Canada
- Max. length: 15 km (9.3 mi)
- Max. width: 0.75 km (0.47 mi)
- Surface area: 1,159.8 ha (2,866 acres)
- Max. depth: 22 m (72 ft)
- Surface elevation: 260 m (850 ft)

Kashwakamak Lake is a freshwater lake in North Frontenac, Frontenac County, Ontario, Canada. It is located east of Cloyne, and southeast of Bon Echo Provincial Park.

The lake is 15 kilometres (9 mi) long, 0.75 kilometres (0.5 mi) wide, has a surface area of 1,159.8 hectares (2,866 acres) with a rocky shoreline and a maximum depth of 22 metres (72 ft), and lies at an elevation of 260 metres (853 ft). The primary inflow and outflow is the Mississippi River, upstream from Marble Lake over the Whitefish Rapids, and downstream, controlled by the Kashwakamak Lake Dam, towards Mud Lake.

This lake is home to a variety of fish species including Largemouth bass, Northern pike, Smallmouth bass, Rock bass, Pumpkinseed, Walleye, and Yellow perch. It is also home to private cottages as well as Aragain Lodge, Fernleigh Lodge, Swing Wright, Twin Oaks Lodge, and Woodcrest Resort Park.

The Ministry of Environment Self Help Program makes it possible along with the Lake Partner Program to provide water quality testing by the Members of the Lake Association volunteers. The Mississippi Valley Conservation Authority has a Watershed Watch Program which provides the comparison of water testing which has taken place since 1976 to present day.

== Recreation ==
The lake has many camping sites that are available for camping. They must be reserved online due volume throughout the season. There are jumping rocks as well as a rope swing located on the lake for public use. The swing rope is located at the Brown's Bay Narrows and the jumping rocks are located west of the swing rope further down the lake.

== See also ==
- List of lakes in Ontario
