= Little Clyde River =

- Location of the mouth of the Little Clyde River in southern Ontario
- Etymology: After the River Clyde in Scotland

Location
- Country: Canada
- Province: Ontario
- Region: Eastern Ontario
- County: Lanark
- Municipality: Lanark Highlands

Physical characteristics
- Source: Tate Lake
  - coordinates: 45°02′23″N 76°35′29″W
  - elevation: 267 m (876 ft)
- Mouth: Clyde River
  - coordinates: 45°07′05″N 76°28′30″W
  - elevation: 169 m (554 ft)

Basin features
- River system: Saint Lawrence River drainage basin

The Little Clyde River is a river in the municipality of Lanark Highlands, Lanark County in Eastern Ontario, Canada. It is in the Saint Lawrence River drainage basin, is a right tributary of the Clyde River, and was named after the River Clyde in Scotland.

== Course ==
The Little Clyde River begins at the outflow from Tate Lake in geographic Dalhousie Township. It flows east, then turns northeast, passes the community of Poland, enters geographic Lanark Township, and reaches its mouth at the Clyde River. The Clyde River flows via the Mississippi River and the Ottawa River to the Saint Lawrence River.

== Tributaries ==
- Gunns Creek (right)
- Poland Creek (right)
- Wilsons Creek (right)

== Sources ==
- Map 11 (PDF) (Map). 1 : 700,000. Official road map of Ontario. Ministry of Transportation of Ontario. 2010-01-01.
- Restructured municipalities - Ontario map #5 (Map). Restructuring Maps of Ontario. Ontario Ministry of Municipal Affairs and Housing. 2006.

== See also ==
- List of rivers of Ontario
