= Plevna, Ontario =

Plevna
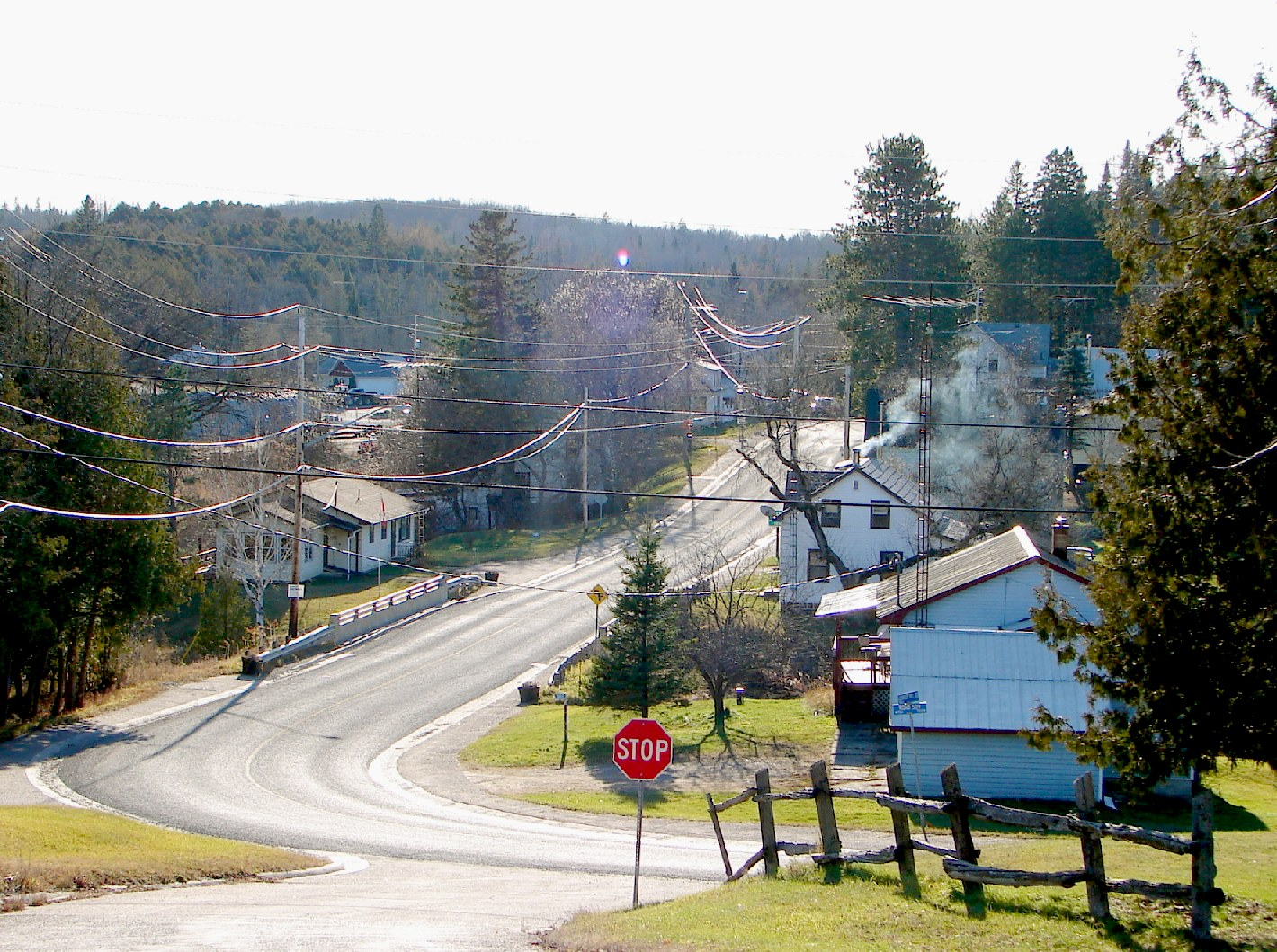
- Highway 509 in Plevna

- Location in southern Ontario
- Coordinates: 44°57′49″N 76°58′57″W
- Country: Canada
- Province: Ontario
- Region: Eastern Ontario
- County: Frontenac
- Municipality: North Frontenac
- Time zone: UTC-5 (EST)
  - Summer (DST): UTC-4 (EDT)
- Area codes: 613, 343

Plevna is an unincorporated community in the municipality of North Frontenac, Frontenac County in Eastern Ontario, Canada. It is located approximately 195 kilometres (121 mi) southwest of Ottawa, and is situated in prime cottage country with many lakes surrounding it.

== Geography ==
Lakes near Plevna include Buckshot Lake, Sand Lake, Grindstone Lake and Brule Lake as well as Fortune, Mackie and Schooner Lakes.

Plevna is on Highway 509, about midway between Highway 41 and Snow Road Station, gateway to Elphin and Lanark County.

== Amenities ==
Amenities found in Plevna include a grocery store, liquor store, restaurant and hardware store Plevna hosts an Anglican Church and River Of Life Christian Fellowship and an elementary school which services children from the surrounding area. Plevna hosts a variety of cottage and cabin rentals as well as many options for camping. Plevna is full of options for fishing, hunting, hiking and viewing Wildlife. Every 3rd Sat of the month is Jack's Jam at the Clar Mill hall, a gathering of musicians from far and wide who come together for a potluck and a night of music.

== History ==
The establishment of the village dates back to the 1860s at the junction of the Mississippi Road, Frontenac Road and Snow Road colonization roads and it still retains its small-town Ontario charm. Originally called Buckshot, the name had to be changed when the Post Office Department objected to it. In 1877, an ultimatum was given to rename the village, or the Post Office Department would do so. After much debate by the village folk, the name "Plevna" was finally decided upon after one resident commented that all the debate over the selection of a new name reminded him of the situation that was ongoing at the Siege of Plevna, then part of the Ottoman Empire. The name was suggested to the Post Office, which adopted the name.
