= North Frontenac =

- Township (lower-tier)
- Township of North Frontenac
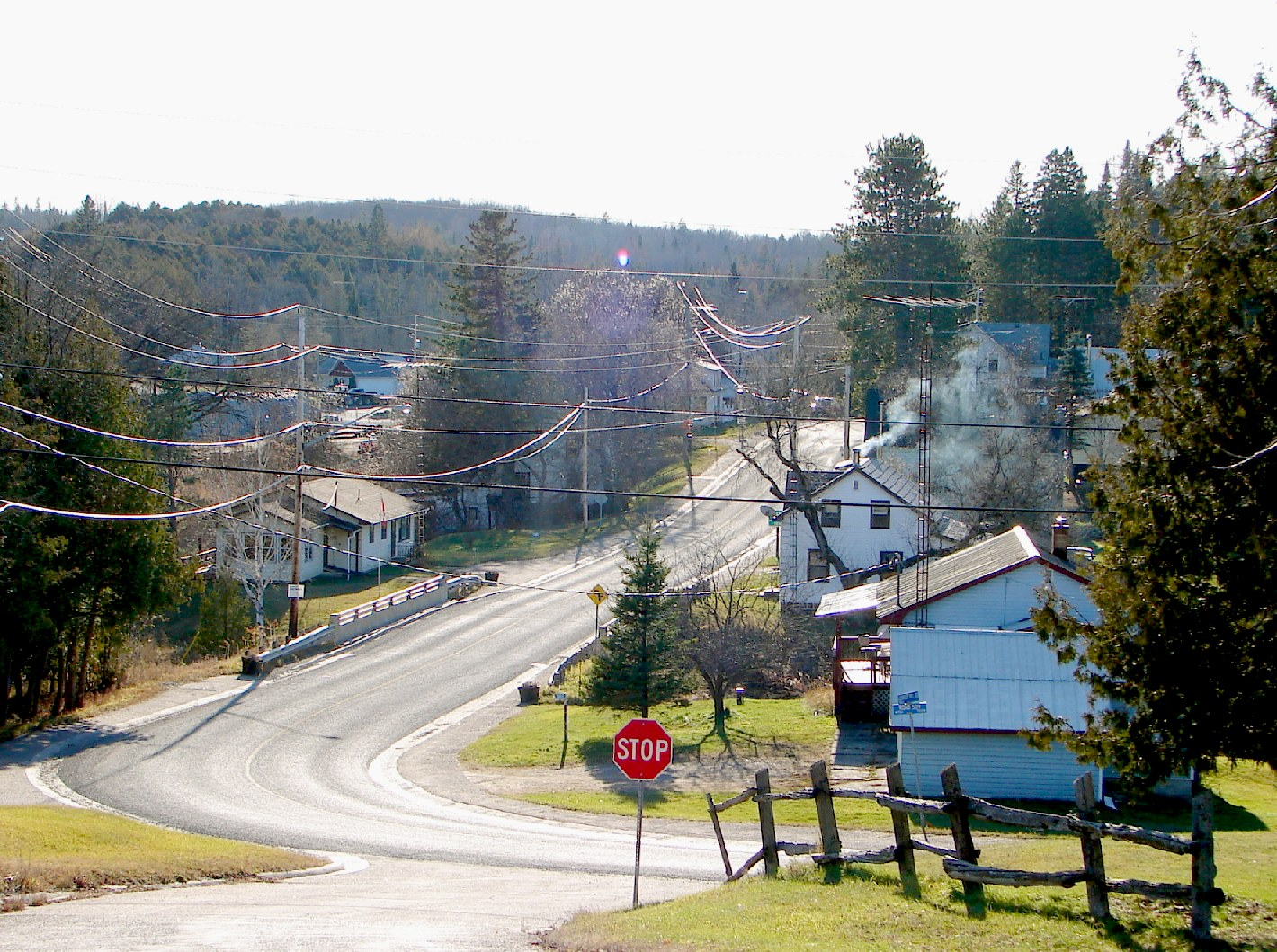
- Plevna
- Motto: Four Seasons, More Reasons
- Location in southern Ontario
- Coordinates: 44°57′N 76°54′W
- Country: Canada
- Province: Ontario
- County: Frontenac
- Incorporated: 1998

Government
  - Type: Township
  - Mayor: Gerry Lichty
  - Fed. riding: Lanark—Frontenac
  - Prov. riding: Lanark—Frontenac—Kingston

Area
  - Land: 1,157.97 km^{2} (447.09 sq mi)

Population (2021)
  - Total: 2,285
  - Density: 2/km^{2} (5.2/sq mi)
- Time zone: UTC-5 (EST)
  - Summer (DST): UTC-4 (EDT)
- Postal Code: K0H
- Area codes: 613, 343
- Website: www.northfrontenac.com

North Frontenac is a township in Frontenac County in eastern Ontario, Canada.

== History ==
North Frontenac was created on January 1, 1998, by the amalgamation of three municipalities: the Township of Barrie; the Township of Clarendon and Miller; and the Township of Palmerston, North and South Canonto.

== Geography ==
North Frontenac is in the heart of Eastern Ontario's cottage country. Cottages and campsites dot the shores of the Township's many clean lakes. Located entirely on the Canadian Shield, the landscape can often be rough and unpredictable, but at the same time provides scenic vistas. Residents, both permanent and seasonal, enjoy a wide variety of outdoor activities. The Township is bordered by Greater Madawaska to the north, Addington Highlands to the west, Central Frontenac to the south and Lanark Highlands to the east.

=== Communities ===
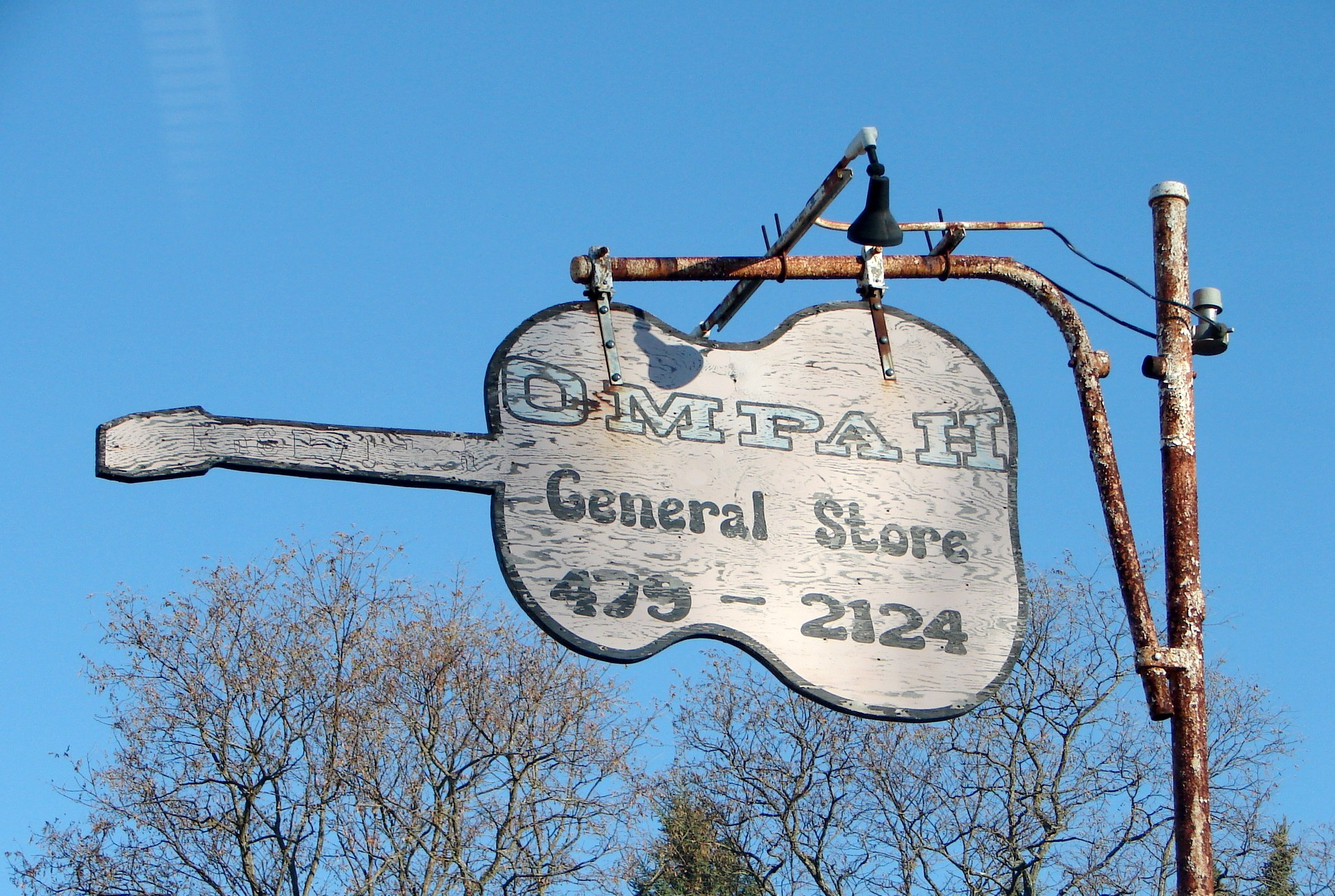
Old store sign in Ompah

The township includes the communities of Ardoch, Beatty, Beech Corners, Canonto, Coxvale, Donaldson, Fernleigh, Harlowe, Mississippi Station, Myers Cave, Ompah, Plevna, Robertsville, Snow Road Station and Wilbur.

=== Lakes ===
Lakes of notable size within the Township's borders are:

- Big Gull Lake
- Buckshot Lake
- Canonto Lake
- Crotch Lake
- Kashwakamak Lake
- Long Schooner Lake
- Malcolm Lake
- Marble Lake
- Mazinaw Lake
- Mississagagon Lake
- Mosque Lake
- Norcan Lake
- Palmerston Lake
- Pine Lake
- Round Schooner Lake

=== Fauna ===
With the Township consisting of a significant portion of Crown land administered by the Ontario Ministry of Northern Development, Mines, Natural Resources and Forestry, North Frontenac is home to many of Ontario's endangered and threatened animals such as;

Endangered:

- American eel
- American ginseng
- Butternut tree
- Eastern small-footed myotis
- Golden eagle
- Lake sturgeon
- Mountain Lion
- Northern myotis
- Tricoloured bat

Threatened:

- Bank swallow
- Barn swallow
- Blanding's turtle
- Cerulean warbler
- Least bittern
- Whip-poor-will
- Bobolink

In the many lakes, rivers and streams you can find:

- Black crappie
- Bluegill
- Brook trout
- Bowfin
- Burbot
- Common carp
- Lake sturgeon
- Lake trout
- Largemouth bass
- Longnose gar
- Muskellunge
- Northern pike
- Pumpkinseed
- Rainbow trout
- Rock bass
- Smallmouth bass
- Walleye
- White crappie
- Yellow perch

== Demographics ==
In the 2021 Census of Population conducted by Statistics Canada, North Frontenac had a population of 2,285 living in 1,131 of its 2,798 total private dwellings, a change of 20.1% from its 2016 population of 1,903. With a land area of 1,157.97 km^{2} (447.09 sq mi), it had a population density of 2.0/km^{2} (5.1/sq mi) in 2021.

Canada census – North Frontenac community profile

	2021	2016	2011
Population	2,285 (+20.1% from 2016)	1,898 (+2.2% from 2011)	1,857 (-2.5% from 2006)
Land area	1,157.97 km^{2} (447.09 sq mi)	1,164.77 km^{2} (449.72 sq mi)	1,164.73 km^{2} (449.70 sq mi)
Population density	2.0/km^{2} (5.2/sq mi)	1.6/km^{2} (4.1/sq mi)	1.6/km^{2} (4.1/sq mi)
Median age	61.6 (M: 60.8, F: 62.0)	54.1 (M: 53.9, F: 54.4)
Private dwellings	2,798 (total) 1,131 (occupied)	2,966 (total)	2,823 (total)
Median household income	$68,000	$51,942

References: 2021 2016 2011

Mother tongue (2021):

- English as first language: 93.4%
- French as first language: 2.0%
- Other as first language: 3.7%

Historical census populations – North Frontenac
Year	Pop.	±%
1996	1,773	—
2001	1,801	+1.6%
2006	1,904	+5.7%
2011	1,857	−2.5%
2016	1,898	+2.2%
2021	2,285	+20.4%
Population counts are not adjusted for boundary changes. Source: Statistics Canada

== Local government ==
North Frontenac is governed by a mayor, a deputy mayor (who serves as both deputy mayor and councilor) and five councilors. Each municipal ward is represented by two councilors. The Mayor and one other member of Council represent the municipality on the Frontenac County Council.

=== Current government ===
- Mayor: Gerry Lichty
- Deputy Mayor: Roy Huetl
- Councilors:
  - Ward 1: Wayne Good
  - Ward 1: Stephanie Regent
  - Ward 2: Vernon Hermer
  - Ward 2: Roy Huetl
  - Ward 3: Fred Fowler
  - Ward 3: John Inglis

=== List of former mayors ===
Mayors of the Township of North Frontenac:

- 1998–2003: Stan Johnson
- 2003–2010: Ron Maguire
- 2010–2014: Bud Clayton
- 2015–2022: Ron Higgins

==== Pre-Amalgamation ====
Reeves of the former Township of Barrie

- 1873–1873: T. Tapping
- 1874–1874: D. Kenyon
- 1875–1875: D. Kenyon
- 1876–1878: T. Tapping
- 1879–1881: R. Scott
- 1882–1882: T. Tapping
- 1883–1883: R. Tapping
- 1884–1886: A. Wickware
- 1887–1887: Wm. Dempsey
- 1888–1893: T. Tapping
- 1894–1894: G. Deline
- 1895–1895: G. Deline
- 1896–1896: Wm. Salmond
- 1897–1897: G. Deline
- 1898–1898: J. Mitchell
- 1899–1899: J. Mitchell
- 1900–1900: G. Deline / Wm. Salmond
- 1901–1904: Wm. Salmond
- 1905–1905: G. Deline
- 1906–1906: G. Deline
- 1907–1909: C. Macgregor
- 1910–1913: Wm. Salmond
- 1914–1917: J. Gray
- 1918–1926: C. Macgregor
- 1927–1933: S. Wheeler
- 1934–1942: H. Levere
- 1943–1951: A. Macgregor
- 1952–1952: A. Hillier
- 1953–1957: J. Head
- 1958–1966: J. Hill
- 1967–1988: T. Neal
- 1989–1990: W. Van Kempen
- 1991–1997: T. Neal

Reeves of the former Township of Clarendon and Miller

- 1865–1882: B. Watkins. (one of the first settlers in Clarendon)
- 1883–1885: J. Howell
- 1886–1891: J. Howell
- 1892–1892: B. Watkins
- 1893–1896: A. Monroe
- 1897–1900: J.F. Card
- 1901–1901: B. Watkins
- 1902–1904: J. Mcdonald
- 1905–1905: S.S. Barton
- 1906–1906: J. Mcdonald
- 1907–1907: J. Mcdonald
- 1908–1912: J.D. Godkin
- 1913–1913: J.F. Card
- 1914–1914: J.F. Card
- 1915–1919: P.J. Wensley
- 1920–1922: T. Armstrong
- 1923–1928: J. Flake
- 1929–1931: J. Brouse
- 1932–1934: J. Flake
- 1935–1951: L. Kring
- 1952–1954: C. Armstrong
- 1955–1955: L. Kring
- 1956–1956: G. Kring
- 1957–1957: C. Armstrong
- 1958–1974: G. Kring
- 1975–1984: Wm. Flieler
- 1985–1997: S. Johnston

Reeves of the former Township of Palmerston, North and South Canonto.

- 1896–1901: J. Mckenzie
- 1902–1902: P. White
- 1903–1903: J. Moore
- 1904–1904: R. Wood
- 1905–1905: Wm. Millar
- 1906–1908: D. Wood
- 1909–1909: Wm. Donaldson
- 1910–1910: D. Wood
- 1911–1915: Wm. Donaldson
- 1916–1924: D. Gemmill
- 1925–1932: S.J. Shanks
- 1933–1949: A.C. Rhodes
- 1950–1952: W.B. Cameron
- 1953–1972: A. Trombley
- 1973–1976: R. Ryder
- 1977–1988: B. Sproule
- 1989–1991: B. Carnell
- 1992–1997: B. Sproule

== Attractions ==
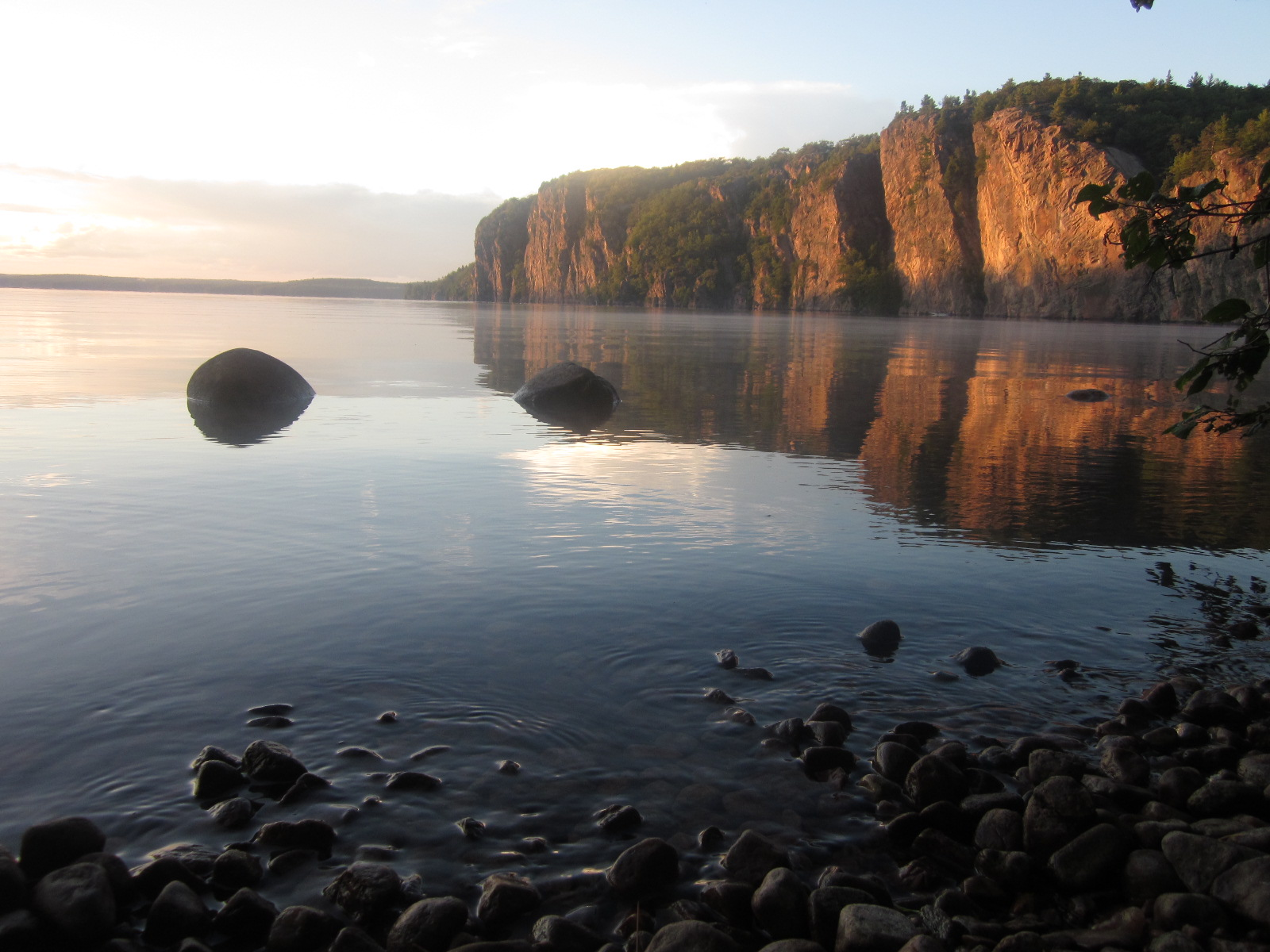
Bon Echo Provincial Park, Mazinaw Rock

The municipality is host to Bon Echo Provincial Park (shared with Addington Highlands) and the North Frontenac Parklands.

On August 3, 2013, North Frontenac became the first municipality in Canada to achieve Dark Sky Preserve Status by the Royal Astronomical Society of Canada.

== Education ==
Students attend the Clarendon Central Public School in Plevna, ON (JK to Grade 8), the North Addington Education Centre in Cloyne, ON (JK to Grade 12) or the Granite Ridge Education Centre in Sharbot Lake, ON (JK to Grade 12). All schools are part of the Limestone District School Board.
