= Peterson Creek (South Branch Little Wolf River tributary) =

Stream in Wisconsin, U.S.

Coordinates: 44°26′10″N 89°08′43″W

Peterson Creek is a stream in the U.S. state of Wisconsin. It is a tributary to the South Branch Little Wolf River.

Peterson Creek was named after A. G. Peterson, a local landowner.
