= Ompah, Ontario =

Coordinates: 45.017°N 76.833°W

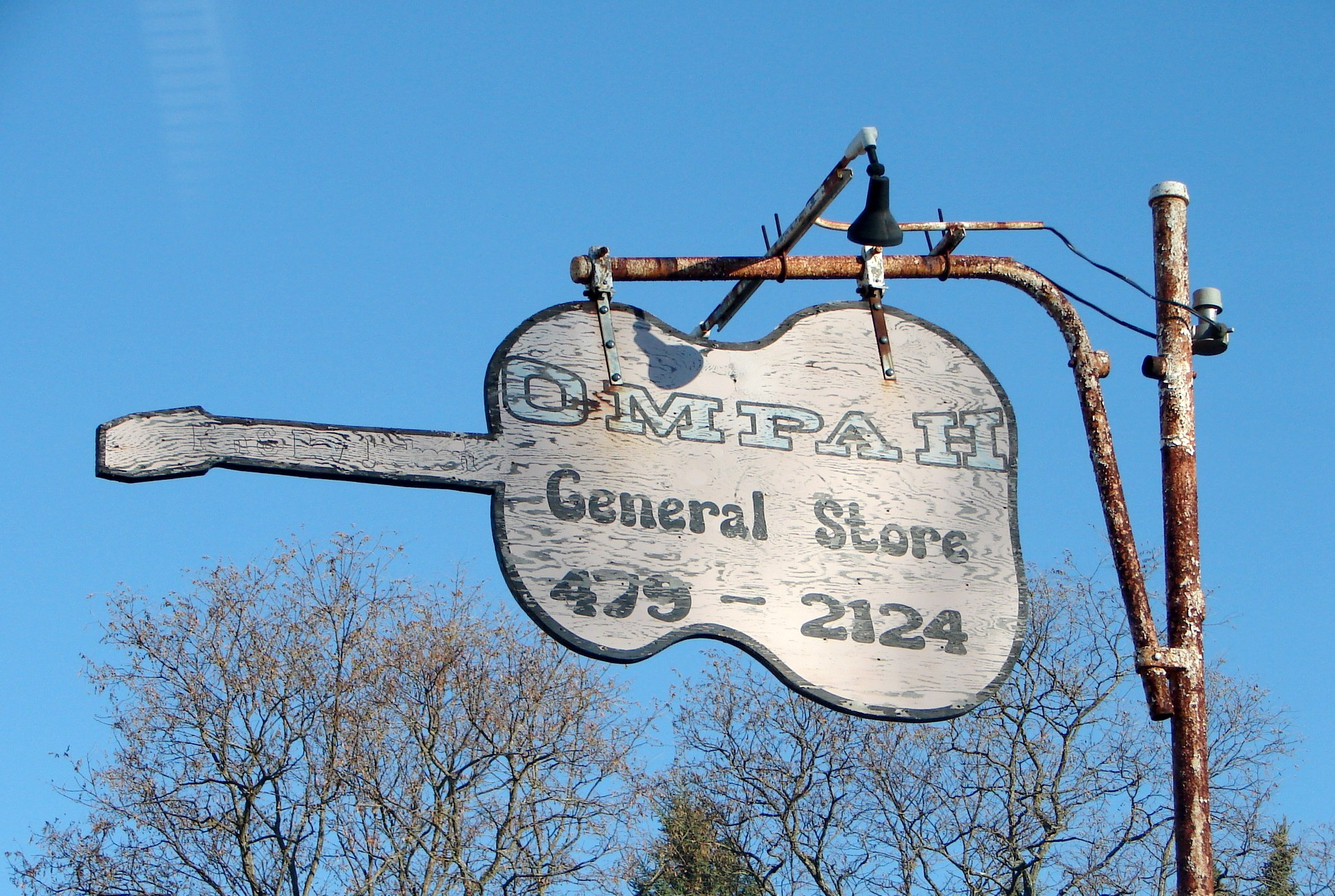
Old store sign in Ompah

Ompah is a village in eastern Ontario, Canada, located in the township of North Frontenac, approximately 100 kilometres (62 mi) southwest of Ottawa. The village is situated close to many lakes including Palmerston Lake, Canonto Lake, Sunday Lake, and Lake Lake.

Ompah is located along a traditional Native portage between Palmerston Lake and the Mississippi River, roughly along what is now River Road. Ompah is located on Highway 509 between Plevna and Snow Road Station along the original "Snow Road".

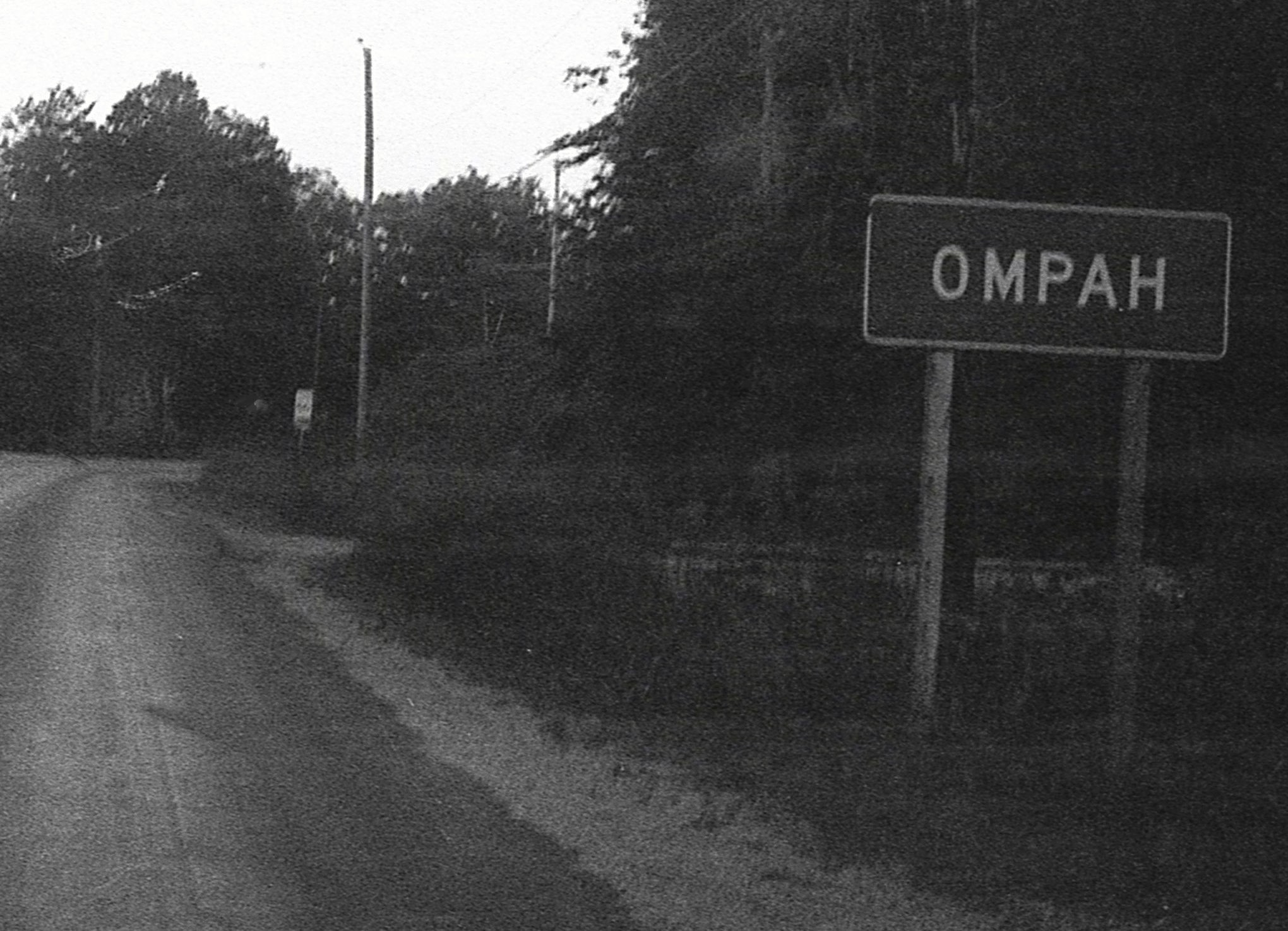
Road sign for Ompah, Ontario, 1990

Ompah was home to the Ompah Stomp, a weekend long party held every Labour Day weekend from 1978 to 1999. It would typically feature popular country music stars. The stomp was shut down after interest declined due to the rising popularity of the Havelock Country Jamboree in nearby Havelock, Ontario.

An old fire tower once stood south of the village and was known as Ompah Tower back in the 1950s.

== Etymology ==
The community name derives from Algonquian for "long step" or "long portage."

== Amenities ==
Amenities include a fire station, library, helipad, marina.

There was once a motel, tavern and a general store, but they have all been closed for various reasons.
