= Lanark, Ontario =

Lanark
- Unincorporated community
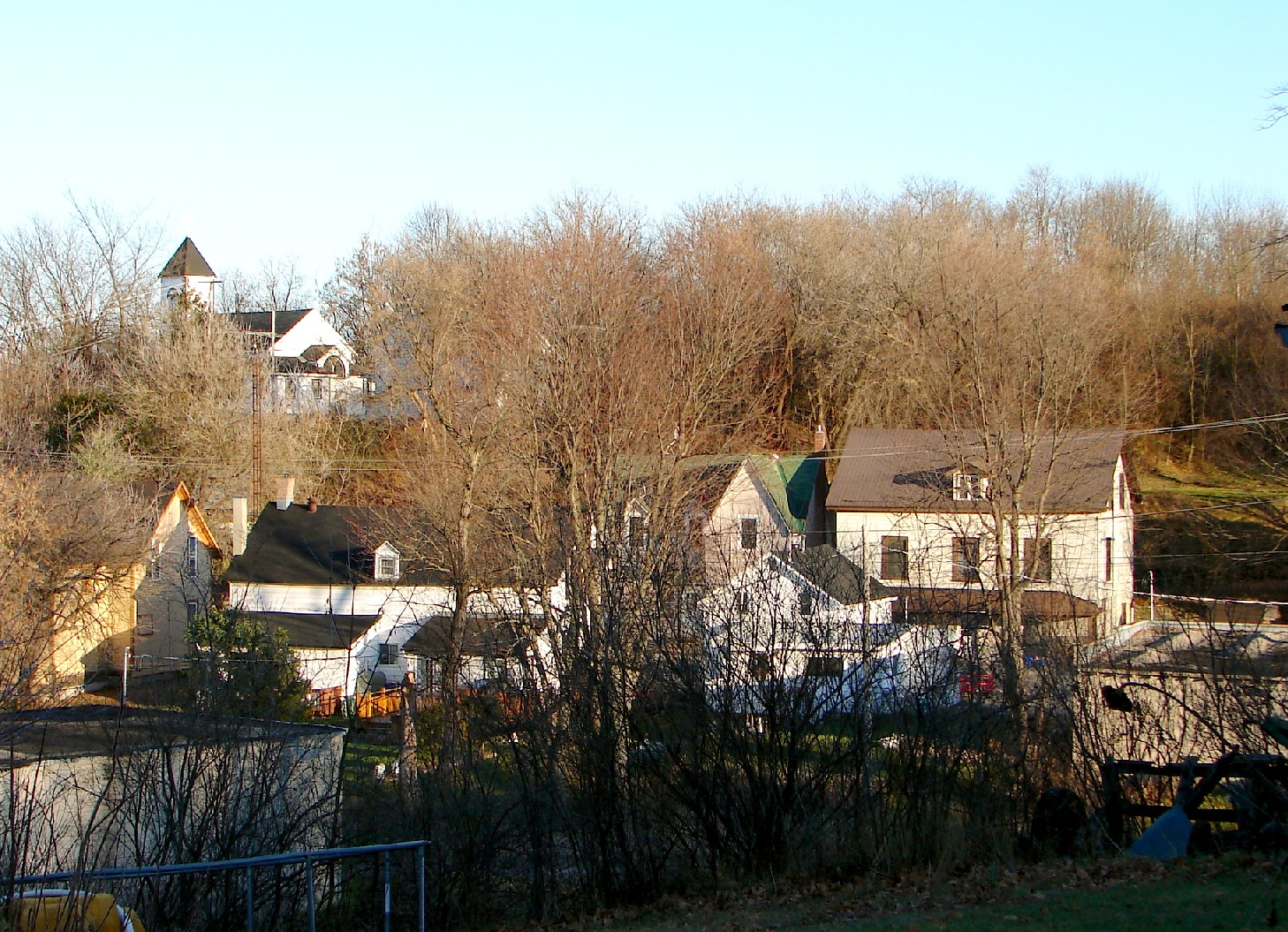

- Location of Lanark in Southern Ontario
- Coordinates: 45°01′02″N 76°21′48″W
- Country: Canada
- Province: Ontario
- County: Lanark
- Municipality: Lanark Highlands
- Settled: 1820
- Incorporated: 1862
- Dissolved (amalgamated): 1997

Area
  - Land: 4.77 km^{2} (1.84 sq mi)

Population (2021)
  - Total: 803
  - Density: 168.4/km^{2} (436/sq mi)
- Time zone: UTC-5 (Eastern Time Zone)
  - Summer (DST): UTC-4 (Eastern Time Zone)
- Postal Code: K0G 1K0
- Area codes: 613, 343

Lanark is an unincorporated community and former village in the municipality (and incorporated township) of Lanark Highlands, Lanark County, in Eastern Ontario, Canada.

It was a separate village municipality from 1862 until May 14, 1997, when it merged with Lavant Dalhousie and North Sherbrooke Township and Lanark Township to form the Township of North West Lanark (which became the Township of Lanark Highlands in July 1997).

== History ==
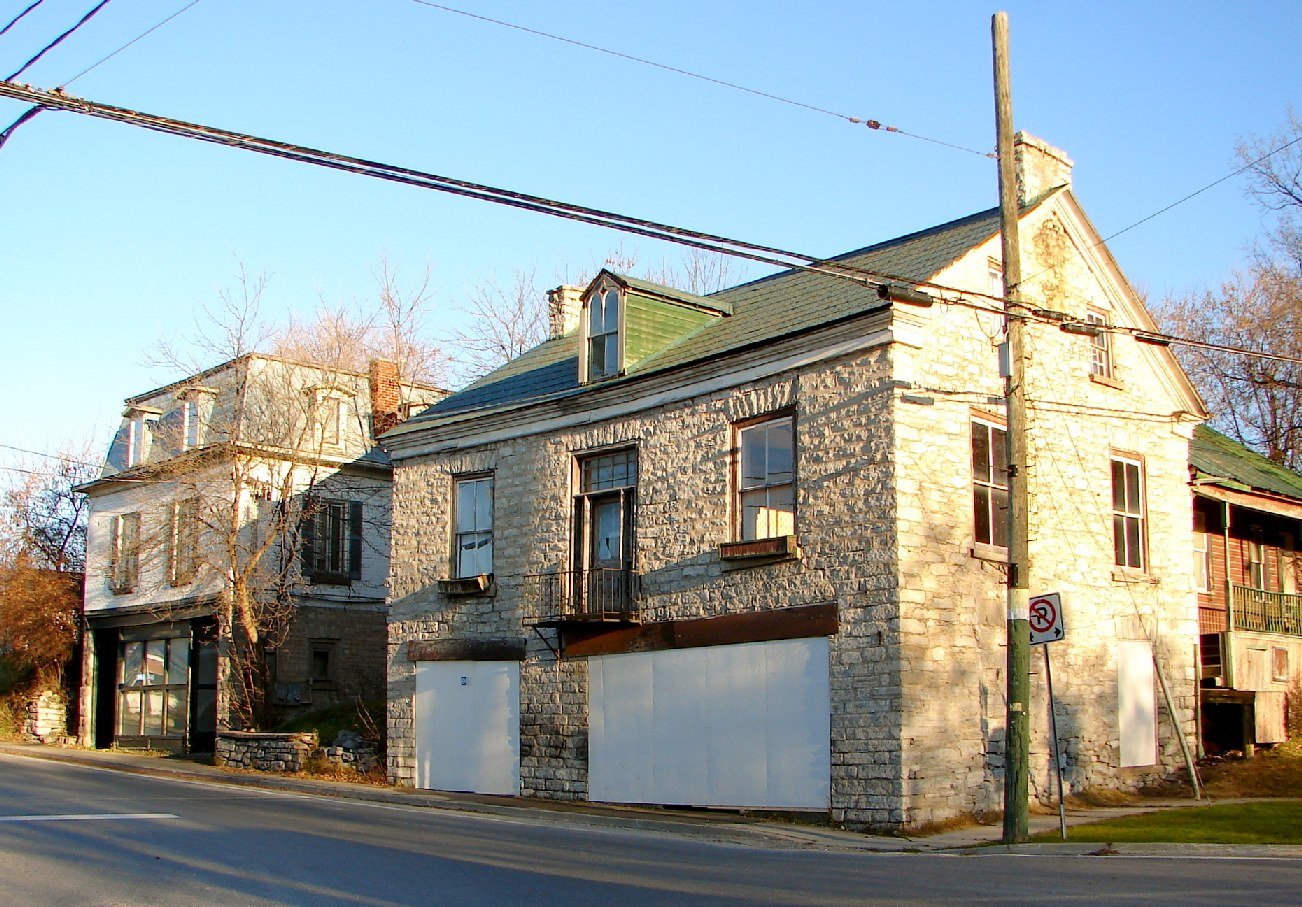
South Street at the intersection with Mill and George Streets

The village was first settled in 1820 by Scottish immigrants who named it after the town of Lanark in Scotland. In 1823 it established its first post office. It soon became a major hub of the lumbering and textile industries, both of which used the Clyde River which runs through the village, as a source of power and as a transportation route to transport logs east to the Ottawa River.

The textile industry lasted for about 170 years, but was finally defeated by the flood of cheap Asian textiles into North America. Jobs in the textile industry moved overseas.

Logging has continued, although in a much reduced manner. Wood is harvested chiefly for the pulp industry or for firewood. In 1959 a major fire destroyed many of the main commercial structures and a number of homes in the village's centre. Most buildings were inadequately insured. Replacement buildings are highly functional in their design. The village has the Lanark and District Museum featuring exhibits of local history.

Until the late 1990s, the major employer in the village was the Glenayr Kitten Mill, which produced clothing and offered their products at several factory outlet stores in the village. Several of the buildings are still known by their numbers (e.g. Kitten Factory #1) to local residents. The Clyde Woolen Mills was the founder of these properties.

== Demographics ==
In the 2021 Census of Population conducted by Statistics Canada, Lanark had a population of 803 living in 364 of its 382 total private dwellings, a change of 3.2% from its 2016 population of 778. With a land area of 4.77 km^{2} (1.84 sq mi), it had a population density of 168.3/km^{2} (436.0/sq mi) in 2021.

According to the 2001 Statistics Canada Census:

- Population: 869
- % Change (1996-2001): 0.5
- Dwellings: 362
- Area (km^{2}.): 4.73
- Density (persons per km^{2}.): 183.7

Race Break Up

- White: 98.5%
- Aboriginal: 1.1%
- Asian: .2%
- Black: .2%

Historical census populations – Lanark, Ontario

Year	Pop.	±%
1871	740	—
1881	752	+1.6%
1891	859	+14.2%
1901	979	+14.0%
1911	737	−24.7%
1921	597	−19.0%
1931	601	+0.7%
1941	663	+10.3%

Year	Pop.	±%
1951	791	+19.3%
1956	879	+11.1%
1961	918	+4.4%
1966	957	+4.2%
1971	861	−10.0%
1976	803	−6.7%
1981	753	−6.2%
1986	813	+8.0%

Year	Pop.	±%
1991	890	+9.5%
1996	865	−2.8%
2001	869	+0.5%
2006	841	−3.2%
2011	696	−17.2%
2016	778	+11.8%
2021	803	+3.2%

Population figures are for Lanark Village (1862–1997) and for Lanark Dissolved municipality/Designated place after 1997. Population counts are not adjusted for boundary changes.
Source: Statistics Canada

== Sport and recreation ==
Lanark has in the past been the location for the Canadian Big League Baseball Championships. This baseball tournament features 18-year-old players from across the country to play at Clyde Memorial Park.
