= Peterson Creek (Cataraqui River tributary) =

- Location of the mouth of Peterson Creek in southern Ontario

Location
- Country: Canada
- Province: Ontario
- Region: Eastern Ontario
- Counties: Frontenac; Leeds and Grenville
- Townships: South Frontenac; Rideau Lakes

Physical characteristics
- Source: Upper Peterson Lake
  - location: South Frontenac, Frontenac County
  - coordinates: 44°30′43″N 76°19′51″W
  - elevation: 147 m (482 ft)
- Mouth: Hart Lake
  - location: South Frontenac, Frontenac County
  - coordinates: 44°32′11″N 76°19′27″W
  - elevation: 120 m (390 ft)
- Length: 6.5 km (4.0 mi)

Basin features
- River system: Lake Ontario drainage basin

Peterson Creek is a river in the Lake Ontario and Cataraqui River drainage basins in South Frontenac, Frontenac County and Rideau Lakes, Leeds and Grenville United Counties in eastern Ontario, Canada. It flows 6.5 kilometres (4.0 mi) from Upper Peterson Lake to its mouth at Hart Lake.

== Course ==
Peterson Creek begins at Upper Peterson Lake in South Frontenac township at an elevation of 147 metres (482 ft) about 4 kilometres (2.5 mi) north of the community of Keelerville. It flows northeast through Lower Peterson Lake to Gamble Bay on Crow Lake. The creek continues northeast through the lake into Rideau Lakes township and exits the lake at the north end at Ormonds Bay. It then flows southwest, re-enters South Frontenac township, and reaches its mouth at the north centre of Hart Lake at an elevation of 120 metres (394 ft), about 7.3 kilometres (4.5 mi) southwest of the community of Jones Falls. Hart Lake drains through two outlets, each of which eventually empty into the Cataraqui River, which flows to Lake Ontario at the city of Kingston.

== See also ==
- List of rivers of Ontario
