= Clyde River (Ontario) =

- Location of the mouth of the Clyde River in southern Ontario
- Etymology: After the River Clyde in Scotland

Location
- Country: Canada
- Province: Ontario
- Region: Eastern Ontario
- County: Lanark
- Municipalities: Tay Valley; Drummond/North Elmsley; Lanark Highlands

Physical characteristics
- Source: Clyde Lake
  - location: Lanark Highlands
  - coordinates: 45°10′57″N 76°41′05″W
  - elevation: 196 m (643 ft)
- Mouth: Mississippi River
  - location: Tay Valley
  - coordinates: 44°59′20″N 76°22′07″W
  - elevation: 146 m (479 ft)

Basin features
- River system: Saint Lawrence River drainage basin
- Tributaries
  - right: Little Clyde River, South Branch Clyde River, Middle Branch Clyde Creek

The Clyde River is a river in Lanark County in Eastern Ontario, Canada. It is in the Saint Lawrence River drainage basin, is a left tributary of the Mississippi River, and was named after the River Clyde in Scotland.

== Course ==
The Clyde flows south from its source at the outflow from Clyde Lake in geographic Lavant Township in the municipality of Lanark Highlands to the community of Clyde Forks, where it takes in the right tributaries Middle Branch Clyde River and South Branch Clyde River. To this point, the river is paralleled by the K&P Rail Trail which follows the course of the former Kingston and Pembroke Railway. The river then heads east, then southeast into geographic Darling Township then geographic Lanark Township, takes in the right tributary Little Clyde River, and arrives at the community of Lanark. The river continues south passing briefly through geographic Drummond Township in the municipality of Drummond/North Elmsley, then reaches its mouth at the Mississippi River in geographic Bathurst Township in the municipality of Tay Valley, north of the town of Perth. The Mississippi River flows via the Ottawa River to the Saint Lawrence River.

== Tributaries ==
- Middleville Creek (left)
- Hopetown Creek (right)
- Bennys Creek (left)
- Little Clyde River (right)
- Eastons Creek (right)
- Black Creek (right)
- Edmunds Creek (left)
- Pilons Creek (left)
- Lavant Creek (right)
- McCreas Creek (left)
- La France Creek (right)
- South Branch Clyde River (right)
- Middle Branch Clyde Creek (right)
- Clyde Lake
  - Baldwin Depot Creek

== Sources ==
- Map 11 (PDF) (Map). 1 : 700,000. Official road map of Ontario. Ministry of Transportation of Ontario. 2010-01-01.
- Restructured municipalities - Ontario map #5 (Map). Restructuring Maps of Ontario. Ontario Ministry of Municipal Affairs and Housing. 2006. Archived from the original on 2020-05-11.

== See also ==
- List of rivers of Ontario
