= Lanark Highlands =

- Township (lower-tier)
- Township of Lanark Highlands
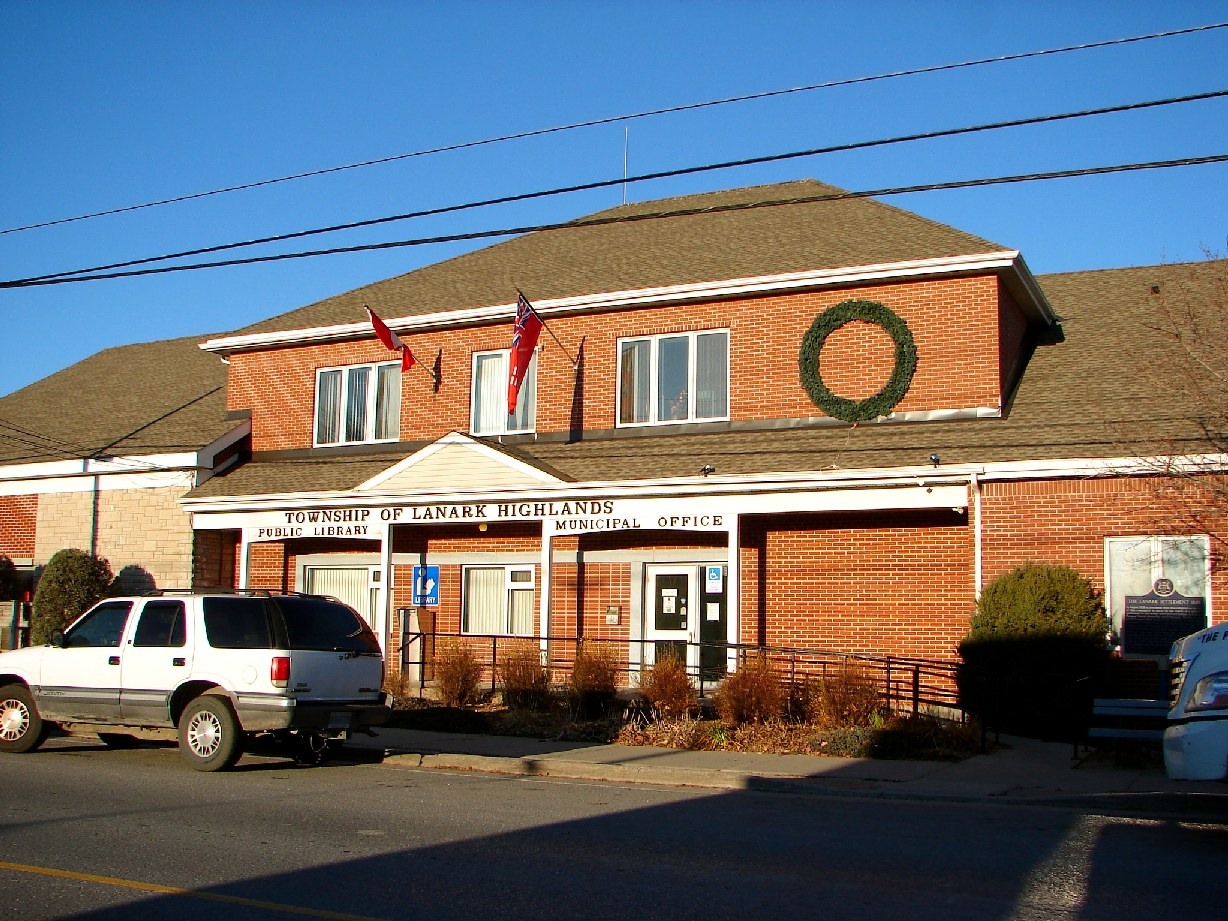
- Municipal office in Lanark

- Location in Southern Ontario
- Coordinates: 45°06′01″N 76°31′09″W
- Country: Canada
- Province: Ontario
- County: Lanark
- Settled: 1820
- Incorporated: July 1, 1997

Government
  - Type: Township
  - Reeve: Peter McLaren
  - Governing Body: Lanark Highlands Township Council
  - MP: Scott Reid (CPC)
  - MPP: Randy Hillier (OPC)

Area
  - Land: 1,031.52 km^{2} (398.27 sq mi)

Population (2021)
  - Total: 5,737
  - Density: 5.6/km^{2} (15/sq mi)
- Time zone: UTC-5 (EST)
  - Summer (DST): UTC-4 (EDT)
- Postal code: K0G 1K0
- Area codes: 613, 343
- Website: www.lanarkhighlands.ca

Lanark Highlands is a township in eastern Ontario, Canada in Lanark County. The township administrative offices are located in the village of Lanark.

== History ==
On May 15, 1997, the United Township of Lavant, Dalhousie and North Sherbrooke was amalgamated with the Township of Lanark and the Village of Lanark to form the Township of North West Lanark. In turn, North West Lanark was merged with Darling Township on July 1, 1997, to create the Township of Lanark Highlands.

== Communities ==
The township comprises the communities of:

- Arklan
- Boyds
- Brightside
- Bullock
- California
- Cedardale
- Clyde Forks
- Clydesville
- Dalhousie Lake
- Elphin
- Flower Station
- Folger
- French Line
- Halls Mills
- Halpenny
- Herron's Mills (ghost town)
- Hood
- Hopetown
- Joes Lake
- Lammermoor
- Lanark
- Lavant
- Lavant Station
- Lloyd
- Marble Bluff
- McDonalds Corners
- Middleville
- Pine Grove
- Poland
- Quinn Settlement
- Rosetta
- Tatlock
- Watsons Corners
- White
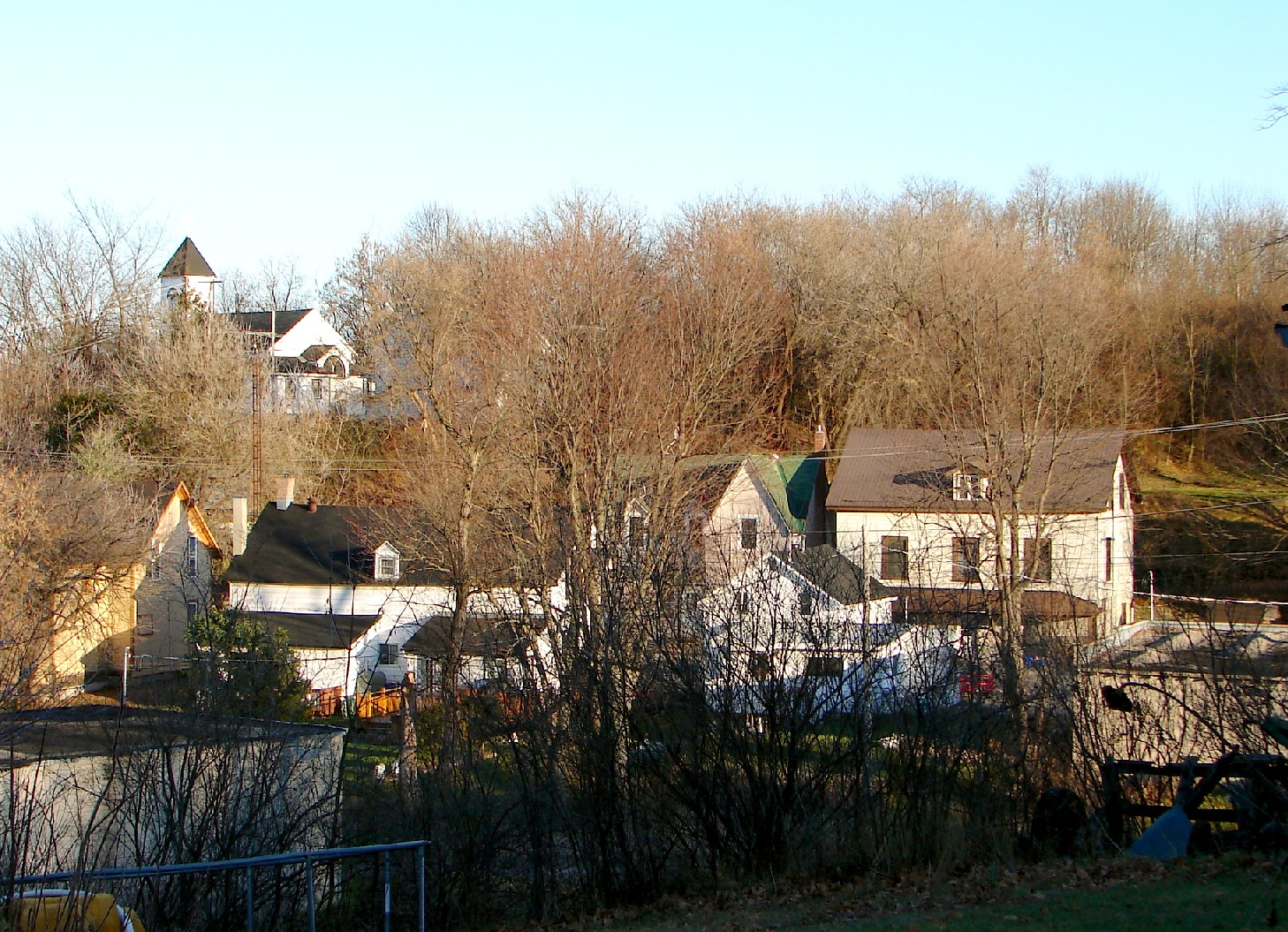
Lanark

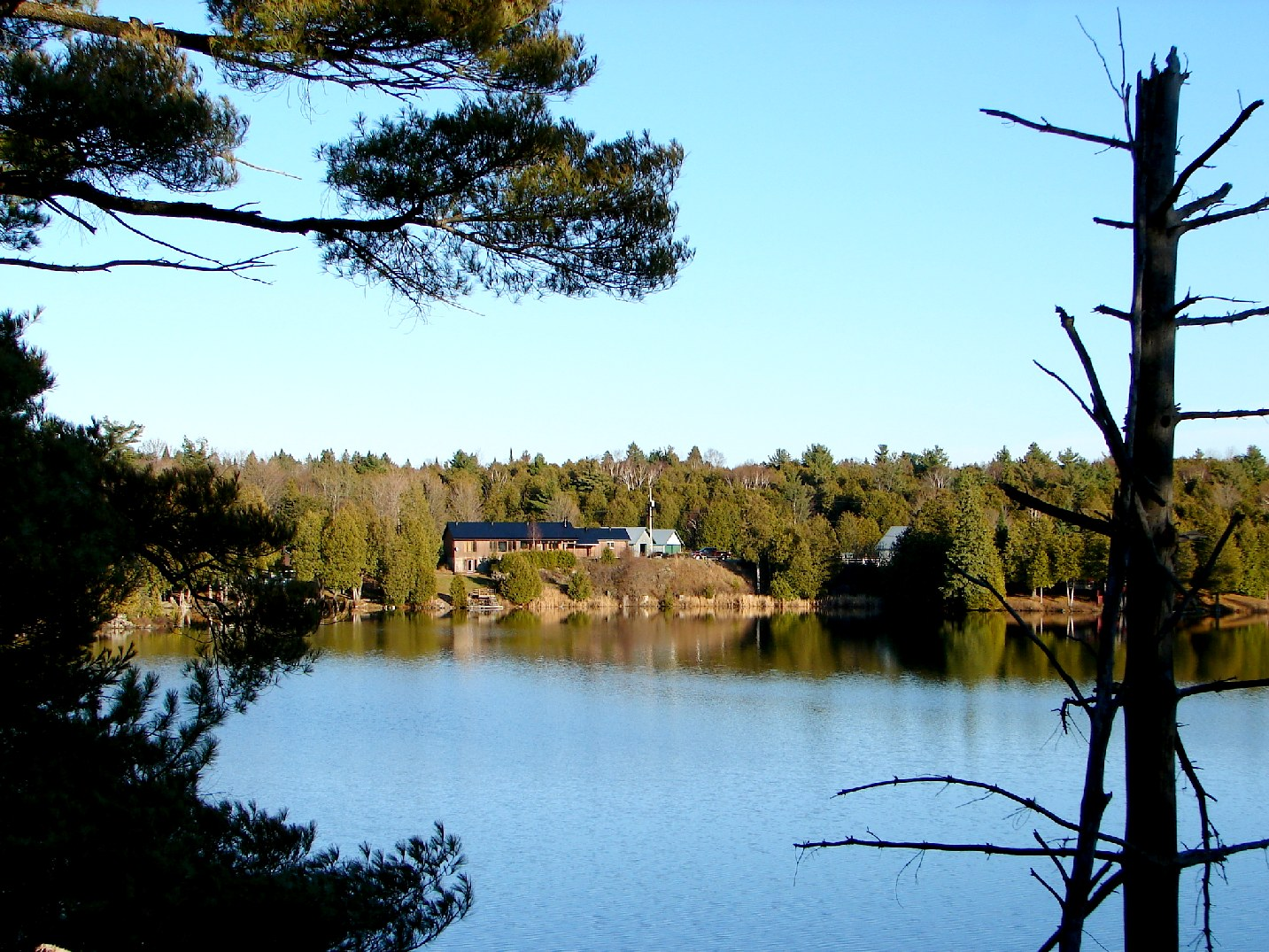
Lavant

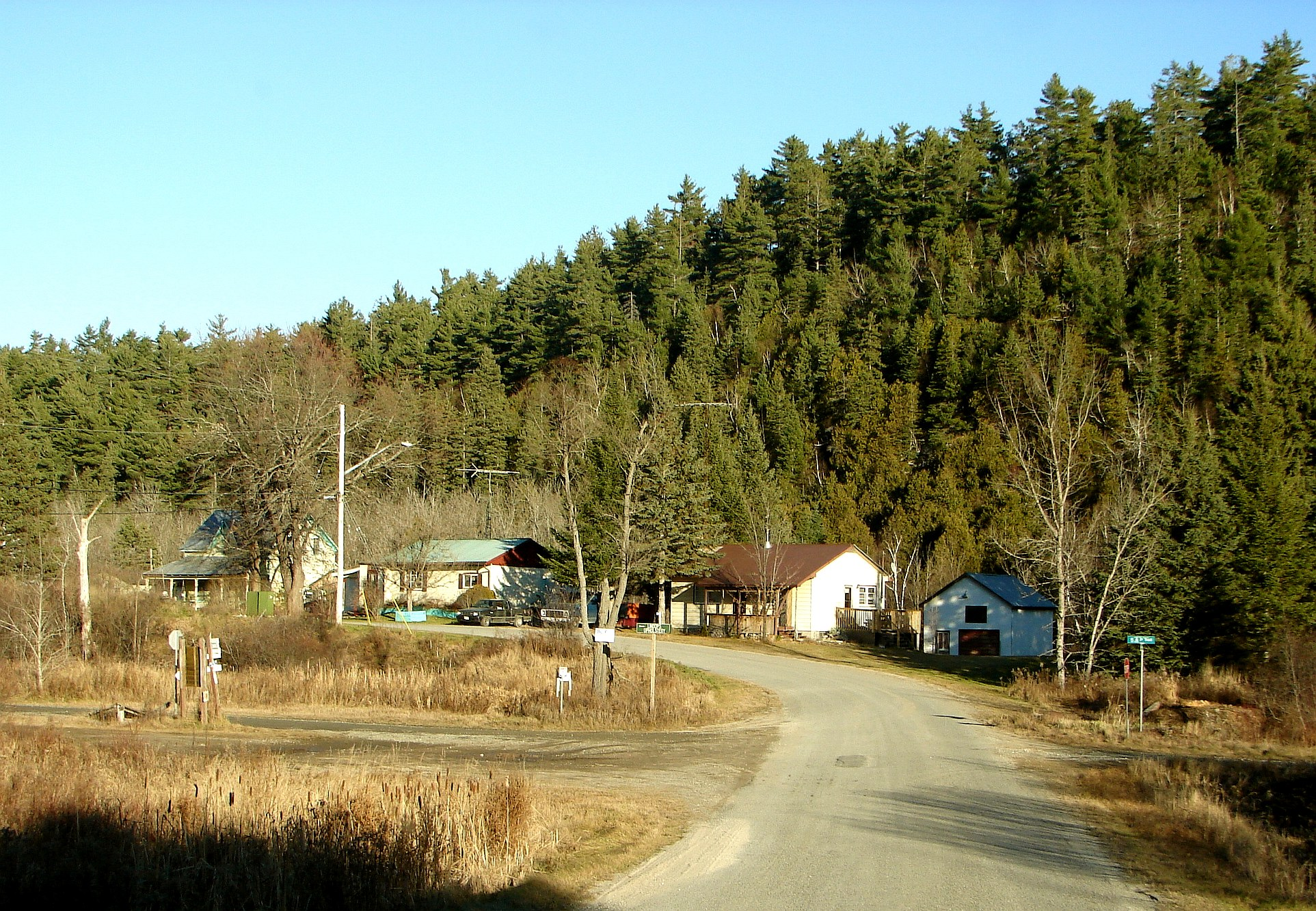
Lavant Station

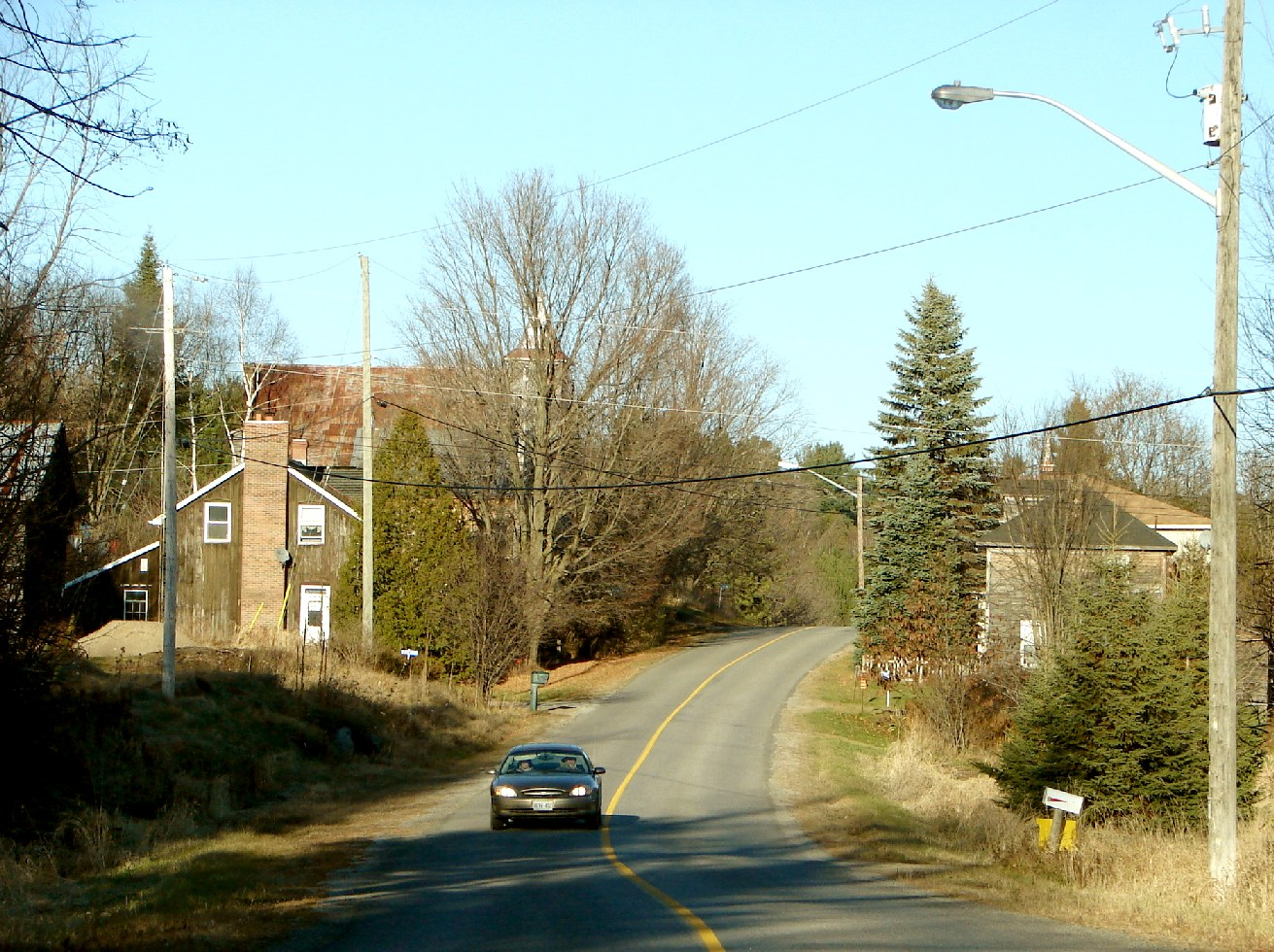
Poland

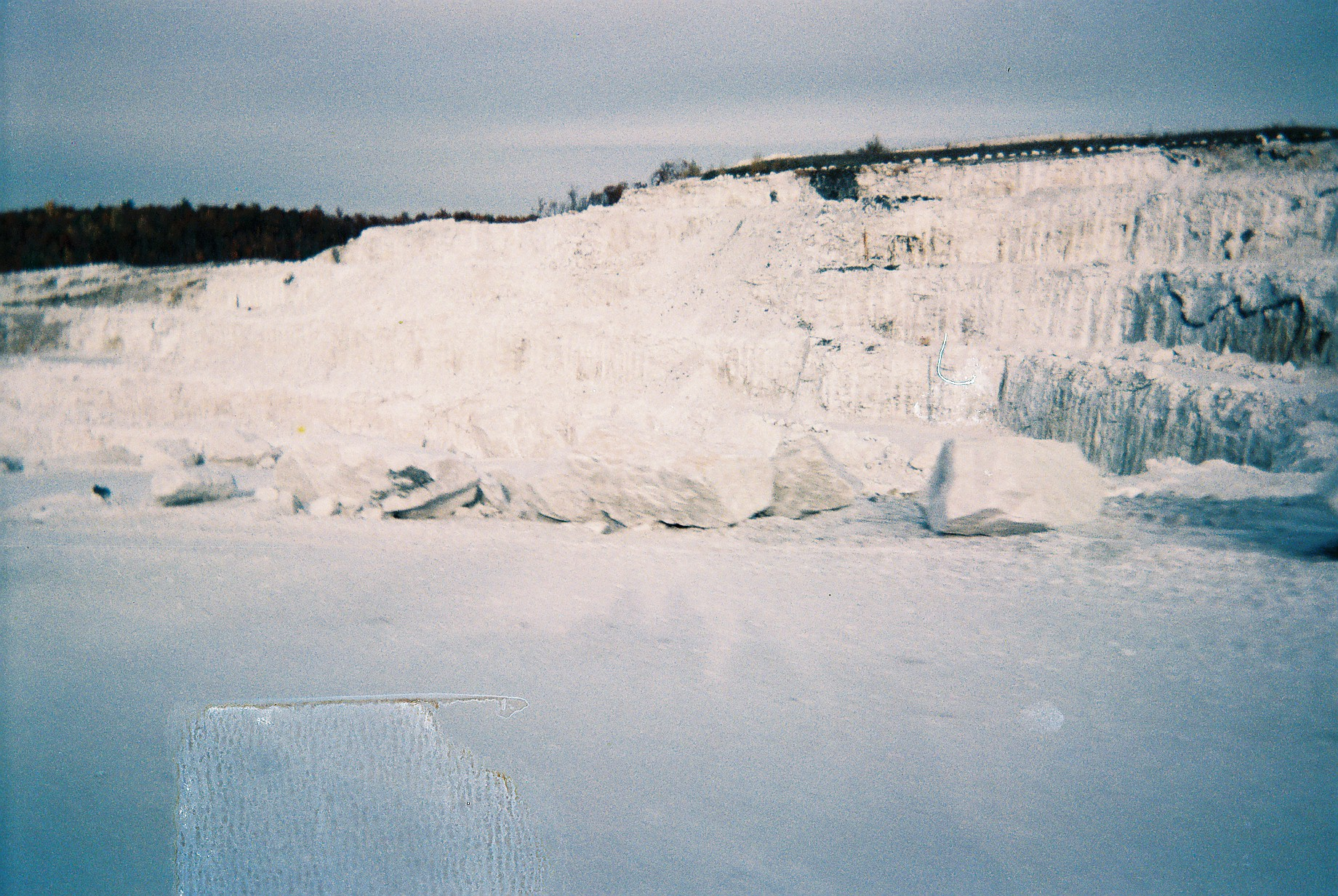
Marble mines near Tatlock

== Demographics ==
In the 2021 Census of Population conducted by Statistics Canada, Lanark Highlands had a population of 5,737 living in 2,494 of its 3,409 total private dwellings, a change of 7.5% from its 2016 population of 5,338. With a land area of 1,031.52 km^{2} (398.27 sq mi), it had a population density of 5.6/km^{2} (14.4/sq mi) in 2021.

Canada census – Lanark Highlands community profile

| | 2021 | 2016 | 2011 |
| Population | 5,737 (+7.5% from 2016) | 5,338 (+4.1% from 2011) | 5,128 (-1.0% from 2006) |
| Land area | 1,031.52 km^{2} (398.27 sq mi) | 1,048.83 km^{2} (404.96 sq mi) | 1,048.19 km^{2} (404.71 sq mi) |
| Population density | 5.6/km^{2} (15/sq mi) | 5.1/km^{2} (13/sq mi) | 4.9/km^{2} (13/sq mi) |
| Median age | 52.0 (M: 51.6, F: 52.4) | 51.2 (M: 51.1, F: 51.3) |
| Private dwellings | 3,409 (total) 2,494 (occupied) | 3,315 (total) | 3,182 (total) |
| Median household income | $81,000 | $67,669 |

References: 2021 2016 2011

Historical census populations – Lanark Highlands
| Year | Pop. | ±% |
|---|---|---|
| 2001 | 4,795 | — |
| 2006 | 5,180 | +8.0% |
| 2011 | 5,128 | −1.0% |
| 2016 | 5,338 | +4.1% |
| 2021 | 5,737 | +7.5% |
Source: Statistics Canada

== Notable people ==
- Earl Manson, professional ice hockey player with the Seattle Metropolitans
- David Francey, songwriter, carpenter.

== See also ==
- List of townships in Ontario
