= Ceinture fléchée =

Traditional French-Canadian wool sash

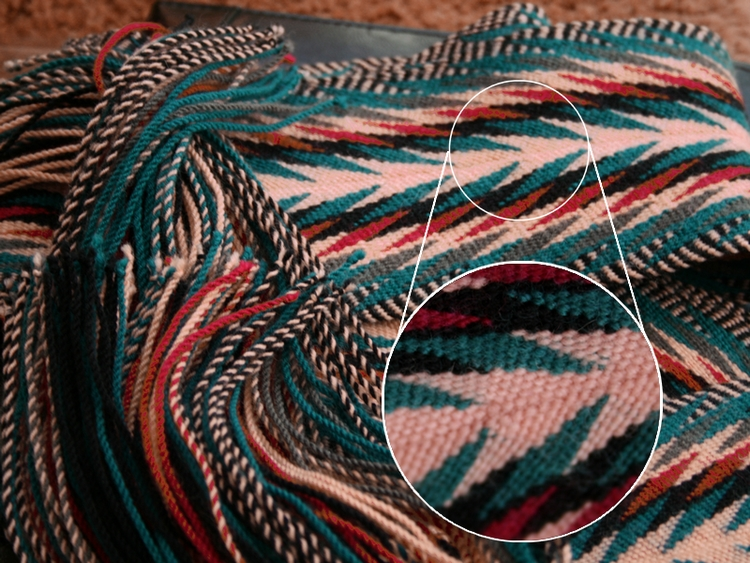
A fingerbraiding modern arrow sash handmade in 2007 (with details of the patterns)

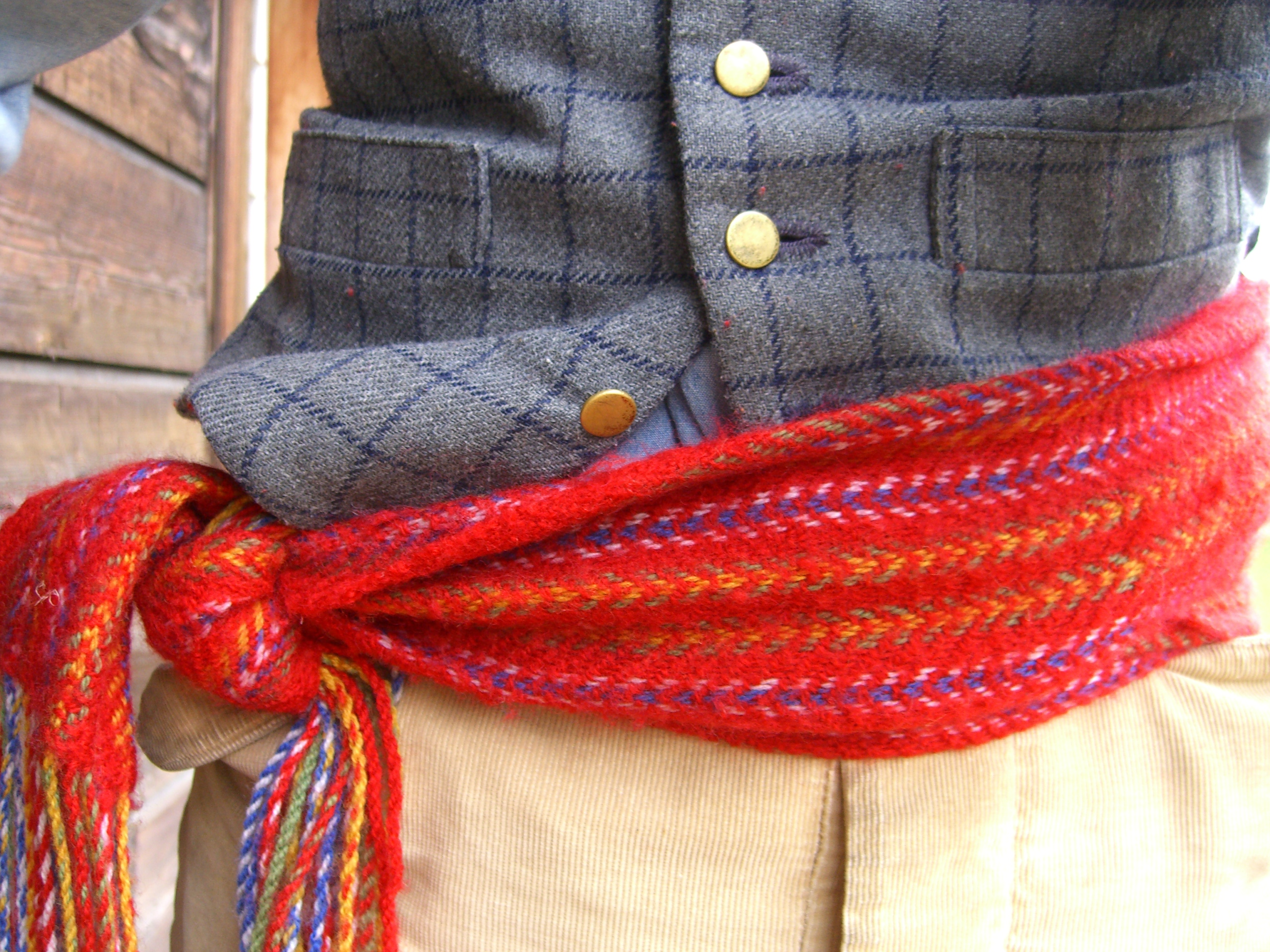
A machine-woven modern arrow sash

The ceinture fléchée [sɛ̃tyʁ fleʃe] (French, 'arrowed sash') or ('arrow sash') is a type of colourful sash, a traditional piece of Québécois clothing linked to at least the 17th century (of the Lower Canada, Canada East and early confederation eras). The Métis also adopted and made ceintures fléchées (French-Canadian and later Metis or Michif translation: "Sayncheur Flayshii" or "Saenche(i)ur Flechey") and use them as part of their national regalia. Québécois and Métis communities share the sash as an important part of their distinct cultural heritages, nationalities, attires, histories and resistances. While the traditional view is that the ceinture fléchée is a Québécois invention, other origins have been suggested as well including the traditional fingerwoven Gaelic crios. According to Dorothy K. Burnham who prepared an exhibit on textiles at the National Gallery of Canada in 1981, and published an accompanying catalogue raisonné, this type of finger weaving was learned by residents of New France from Indigenous peoples. With European wool-materials, the syncretism and unification of Northern French and Indigenous finger-weaving techniques resulted in the making of Arrowed Sashes. The Arrow Sash pattern is the oldest known sash design; it was produced by Québécois artisans in 18th century. The Assomption pattern was produced after 1852.

== History ==
In Quebec, the sash was worn by men in winter, tied around winter coats at the waist to keep out the cold. It had a utilitarian purpose and was considered fashionable and was worn by both the upper and habitant classes. The traditional width was 15 to 25 centimetres, and its length can easily be more than 2 metres. Fur traders also wore it to prevent back injuries and hernias.

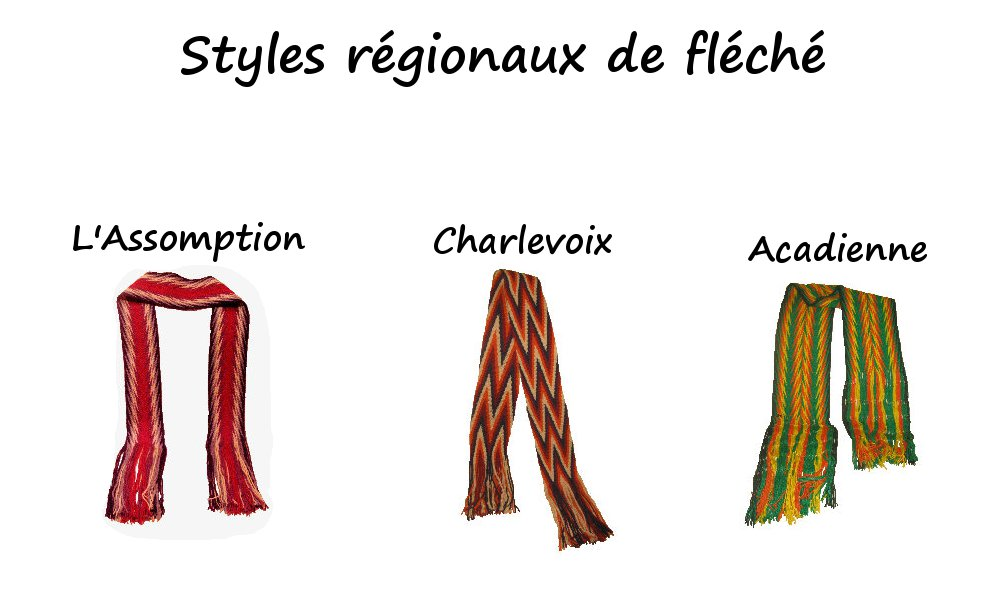
Three styles of the sash. From left to right: Assumption, Charlevoix and Acadian.

It is adorned by an arrowed pattern and was worn around the winter coats of the time. It is also a symbol of the Lower Canada Rebellion and the Quebec Winter Carnival, as it is worn by the festival mascot, Bonhomme Carnaval. Imitations are sold and seen throughout the carnival. It is also an extremely important symbol of cultural pride for Québecois and Francophones in minority contexts across Canada outside of Québec. Franco-communities across Canada wear the sash during diverse and unique winter festivals. For example, the Festival du Voyageur in Manitoba, and Festival du Flying Canoë Volant in Alberta. During the Lower Canada Rebellion, Québécois people boycotted British products to resist English-Canada dominance. Because buttons and button-up coats were typically British-produced, the Québécois "rebels" commonly sewed their own clothes and wore the ceinture fléchée to keep their coats (capotes) closed. This was the main influence to the sash becoming an important part of the Lower Canada Rebellion uniform. The belt is represented in a number of artistic creations, such as the illustration Le Vieux de '37 by Henri Julien, the painting L'Assemblée des six-comtés by Charles Alexander Smith and the song Mon Pays, suivi du Reel des Aristocrates from néo-trad musical band Les Cowboys Fringants.

The arrow sash was part of the traditional costume of the Lower Canada habitant at least from 1776 on. Although at that time the British visitors and the German mercenaries who noticed its presence called it a "coloured sash". That is what Thomas Anbury called it when he wrote his account of travel after his visit to Charlesbourg and Beauport in 1776. In 1777, Charlotte Luise de Riedesel, arriving from Germany to rejoin her husband, Major-General Frederick, related that when she met him in Chambly, he was wearing a red and blue sash with fringes over the traditional Canadian costume to keep him warm as he was still suffering from influenza. That same year, a German mercenary lodged at Sainte-Anne related how people in their home were weaving the colored sashes using their domestic wool. In 1778, E.V. Germann made a drawing showing clearly a Canadian peasant wearing his sash, the design was a chevron. That drawing is a proof of what is written by others. Elisabeth Simcoe who lived in Quebec city in 1792 for more than a year wrote about the Canadians, "(…) their coats are tied round with a coloured sash."

When in 1798, the corpse of a drowned voyageur was found along the St. Lawrence River, in Verchères, Labadie wrote in his personal diary that the voyageur was wearing "…une jolie cinture à flesche" Also in 1798, the inventory after death of Mrs Chaboillez, whose husband, Charles, was one of the founders of the Beaver Club, numbered "deux cintures à flesches" In 1806, the British John Lambert after having visited many villages wrote that five habitants out of six wore a colored sash. He even specified that sometimes the sash was decorated with beads. The sash was changing in its design, but this cannot be attributed to anyone in particular.

The coloured sash was brought to western Canada by the men working for the North West Company. These voyageurs wore their sashes when leaving Lower Canada and travelling for the fur company. Their sashes attracted the attention of several nations with whom they exchanged goods and soon these people wished to possess such sashes. The company then had many sashes woven in Montreal and area with the fine worsted wool it imported from England. Beside the NWC, the Hudson's Bay Company also became interested in that barter article. One of its agents made a request to satisfy that wish. He wrote: "…worsted of colour to make sashes of the latter I have got sample of from my neighbour which will send home". His neighbour was Charles Boyer of the NWC. The sashes adopted by the Indians and the Métis, sons of the voyageurs, are still favoured. They even name it their identity symbol. However, quite often the so-called Métis sashes are not the authentic hand-woven sashes but the kind woven on looms in England, this became the main source of sashes in the Old Northwest after the Hudson's Bay Company and North West Company amalgamated in 1821.

The design of the sash continued to be modified and finally became a standard type that was mainly produced in the L'Assomption region around 1835, according to the historian Mason Wade. The HBC agents who came to collect them at Fort Assomption named these sashes l'Assomption in the accounting books.

Despite its great popularity in Lower Canada as well as in the West, there was a slow-down in its production. That was probably due to the decline of the fur trade in 1870 and in part to the suggestion of the parish priest Tancrède Viger to the weavers, to stop producing, considering them very badly paid for their work.

Sashes were worn by snow-shoers and by retired fur traders who took residence in Montreal and area. Many artists left drawings, paintings and sketches confirming the popularity of the sash. A few women continued weaving sashes and ensured the handing-down of the craft to other generations and the current one.

Marius Barbeau was very interested in ceinture fléchée trying to find its origin. He did not, but left many clues to learn more of its presence, popularity if not its origin. E.Z. Massicotte, archivist at Montreal City Hall and folklorist, continued Barbeau's research and concluded: "la ceinture fléchée un chef d'œuvre de l'industrie domestique du Canada". Yet no such type of diagonal weaving is known elsewhere in the world, let alone in France. It seems that Native Americans were quick to improve their techniques upon the discovery of brightly coloured yarns that they did not have access to previous to contact, and often took apart fabrics to reuse the yarn for sashes, and a photo of an example is shown in Burnham's book. Since 1968 many persons learned to hand weave ceintures fléchées though not all kept weaving sashes, many taught the craft and are spreading its knowledge. Many popular singers, folklore dancers and especially Bonhomme Carnaval are contributing to make it known to visitors and in various countries.

== Fabric-making process ==
Many steps are required in the creation of a ceinture fléchée. First, the weaver picks the wool threads that they need. The threads have to be long enough so that the person who will wear the sash can pass it twice around the waist. The weaver needs to add the length of the fringes at each end of the belt. The fringes are used to tie the arrow sash.

After that, the weaver organizes the threads and weaves them to create designs of lightning bolts (zigzags), flames (lozenges) and arrow heads (usually in the middle of the sash). Finally, to make the fringes, the weaver finishes the belt by making twists or braids with the length of thread that remains.

In the creation of a perfect ceinture fléchée or the intricate beadwork designs that would adorn various artifacts a hard callus develops on the tips of the finger. This is referred to as a "needle finger". It was considered a "rite of passage" for young girls and is acknowledged by the matriarchs in the family.

== See also ==
- Culture of Quebec
- Hudson's Bay point blanket
- Folk costume
- Lower Canada Rebellion
- Metis people (Canada)
- Quebec Winter Carnival
- Festival du Voyageur

== General and cited references ==
=== In English ===
- Austin, Robert J. (2000). A Manual of Fingerweaving. A well ilustruted and colorful "How to do" sashes. Editor: Earl C. Fenner, published by Crazy Crow Trading Post Printed in Canada. ISBN 978-1-929572-00-7.
- Barbeau, Marius (1937). Assomption Sash, Ottawa: Dept. of Mines, National Museum of Canada. [Bulletin No. 93, Anthropological Series No. 24].
- Beauvais, Michelle (2007). Braided Assomption Sash: so called "ceintured fléchée" or "arrowhead-design sash" pp. 37–42 in Space, Time and Braid published by Texte. Inc. Author Makiko Tada and Hiroyuki Hamada, printed in Japan (ISBN 978-4-925252-21-8).
- Bourdeau-Picard, Michelle (2004). An Alluring Symbol: The Arrow Sash in Canadian Art. Catalogue of an exhibition held at the Musée d'art de Joliette, Québec. May 21 to Aug. 22, 78 p. (ISBN 2-921801-28-0).
- Burnham, Dorothy K. (1976).Braided "Arrow" sash of Quebec. Irene Emery Roundtable at the Textile Museum Washington D.C.. [This was attended by Noemi Speiser.]
- Burnham, Dorothy K. (1981). The Comfortable Art: spinning and weaving in Canada. Chapter 2: Indian and French Braiding, published by National Museum of Canada. Burnham joined the staff of the Royal Ontario Museum in 1929 as a "second assistant draftsman" and became its first curator of textiles in 1939.
- Findley, Gerald Lee (2019). Fingerwoven Sashes: Basic Techniques. The book provides detailed instructions for three forms of fingerweaving that were developed by the people of the First Nations, and the settlers of North America. Amazon print on demand, Paperback : 193 pages ISBN 978-1070707488, ASIN 1070707481
- Gottfred, J. "Ceinture Fléchée: Finger Weaving a Voyageur Sash", in Northwest Journal, Vol. VI, pp. 1–5.
- James, Carol (2008). Fingerweaving Untangled. An illustrated beginner's guide including detailed patterns and common mistakes, Altona, Manitoba: Friesens Printing, p. 64. ISBN 978-0-9784695-0-4.
- Speiser, Noémi (1983). "The Manual of Braiding" published by the author (Basel) Switzerland. Reedited in 1988,1991,1997. Noémi Speiser is an international authority on Braids having researched the subject for over 35 years.
- Turner, Altar A. (1973). Finger Weaving: Indian braiding, by Sterling Publishing, New York. ISBN 0-8069-5264-4. Reprinted 1989 by Cherokee Publications NC 28719
- Vien, Louise; Barkwell, Lawrence. "History of the Metis Sash" (PDF).

=== In French ===
- Association des artisans de ceinture fléchées de Lanaudière inc. (1994). Histoire et origines de la ceinture fléchée traditionnelle dite de L'Assomption, collaboration avec le département d'ethnologie de l'université Laval à Québec. 125 p. Édition du Septentrion: Sillery, Québec. (ISBN 2-89448-002-4) (preview).
- Barbeau, Marius (1945). Ceinture fléchée, Montréal: Editions Paysana, 110 p. (ISBN 0885150341)
- Beauvais, Michelle (2007). Le tressage au-delà du trois brins avec révision (ressources électronique) Granby, M. Beauvais 167 pages (ISBN 978-2-9809125-1-1)
- Beauvais, Michelle (2006). Le tressage au-delà du trois brins, Granby: M. Beauvais, 137 p. (ISBN 2-9809125-0-6)
- Bourdeau-Picard, Michelle (2004). Un symbole de taille: la ceinture fléchée dans l'art canadien. Catalogue d'une exposition tenue du 21 mars au 22 août au Musée d'art de Joliette, Québec. 78p. (ISBN 2-921801-28-0).
- Bourret, Françoise, Lucie Lavigne (1973). Le fléché : l'art du tissage au doigt, Montréal: Éditions de l'Homme, 222 p. (ISBN 077590399X)
- Brousseau, Hélène Varin (1980). Le fléché traditionnel et contemporain, Montréal: La Presse, 133 p. (ISBN 2890430464)
- Genest Leblanc, Monique (2003). Une jolie cinture à flesche. sa présence au Bas Canada, son cheminement vers l'Ouest, son introduction chez les Amérindiens. Les Presses de l'Université Laval, Québec QC. Science humaine et sociale. 178 p. (ISBN 2-7637-7858-5).
- Hamelin, Véronique L. (1983). Le Fléché authentique du Québec par la méthode renouvelée, Outremont: Léméac, 256 p. (ISBN 276095353X)
- LeBlanc, Monique (1977). Parle-moi de la ceinture fléchée!, Montréal: Fides, 107 p. (ISBN 0775506613)
- LeBlanc, Monique (1974). J'apprends à flécher, Montréal: R. Ferron Éditeur, 127 p.
- Verdeau-Hemlin, Denise (1990). Évolution des motifs de fléché, Montréal: Association des artisans de ceinture fléchée du Québec, 26 p. (ISBN 2980118915)

=== Specialized references in textiles ===
- Burnham, Dorothy, K. (1976). Braided "Arrow" sashes of Quebec. Emery Roundtable at the Textile Museum of Washington, D.C. (with the presence of Noemi Speiser). Dorothy Burnham is an historian in textile, Canada. She start working at the Royal Ontario Museum in 1929 as a second assistant "draftsman" and became its first curator. She is an authority in textile history.
- Burnham, Dorothy K. (1981). The Comfortable Art: Tradition Spinning and Weaving in Canada. Chapter 2. Indian and French Braiding, National Museum of Canada, Ottawa. En français, L'art des étoffes: filage et tissage traditionnels au Canada. Chapitre 2. Indian and French Braiding, National Museum of Canada, Ottawa.
- Emery, Irene (1966). The Primary Structures of Fabrics, The Textile Museum Washington, D.C.
- Jouppien, Jerry H. "The Ceinture Flechee: A Pictorial Gallery. Published by J. H. Jouppien, April 2017, 135pp, 80 colour plates
- Monique Genest LeBlanc. Mémoire de Maîtrise : La ceinture fléchée au Québec, 1991, un. Laval, Québec. Ethnologie des Francophones en Amérique du Nord, département d'Histoire, faculté des Lettres
- Monique Genest LeBlanc. Thèse de doctorat : Introduction de la ceinture fléchée chez les Amérindiens : création d'un symbole de statut social, 1996, Un. Laval, Québec,
- Monique Genest LeBlanc. « Une cinture à flesche » Sa présence au Bas-Canada, son cheminement vers l'Ouest, son introduction chez les Amérindiens. 2003, Les presses de l'université Laval, Québec.
- Speiser, Noémi (1983). The Manual of Braiding. Published by the author, Basel, Switzerland. Reedition:1988-1991-1997. Noémi Speiser is an international authority on braids, having researched the subject over 35 years.=
