= Assembly of the Six Counties =

1873 assembly of Patriotes

Painting of the Assembly of the Six Counties by Charles Alexander Smith and executed in 1890.

The Assembly of the Six Counties (French: Assemblée des six-comtés) was an assembly of Patriote leaders and approximately 6,000 followers held in Saint-Charles, Lower Canada (present-day Quebec) on October 23 and October 23, 1837, despite the June 15 Proclamation of the government forbidding public assemblies.

Presided by Wolfred Nelson, it is the most famous of the various public assemblies held during that year protesting the Russell Resolutions. It is a prelude to the Lower Canada Rebellion of 1837. The "six counties" refer to Richelieu, Rouville, Saint-Hyacinthe, Chambly, Verchères and L'Acadie.

== History ==
The Ninety-Two Resolutions of the Patriotes had demanded democratic reforms for Lower Canada from Great Britain. They had been denied mainly by the Russell Resolutions, which sparked a number of assemblies of protest in 1837. The Saint-Charles assembly was attended by 13 members of the Legislative Assembly of Lower Canada. On the field, a column, the Colonne de la liberté, had been raised with the inscription "À Papineau ses compatriotes reconnaissants" ("To Papineau his thankful compatriots"). A replica, inaugurated in 1982, stands today on the site.

It saw the speeches of the likes of Louis-Joseph Papineau and Wolfred Nelson. Papineau advocated pursuing the constitutional struggle through economic boycotts of British products while Nelson and Doctor Cyrille Côté supported an armed uprising. "I claim the time has come to melt our spoons to make bullets", thundered Nelson. Étienne Parent also spoke and supported non-forceful methods. The assembly voted a number of resolutions, as did the other 1837 assemblies. They notably proclaimed human rights, refused to recognize the new Executive Council of Lower Canada and approved the Société des fils de la liberté. They did not mention the use of force.

This event prompted the negative reaction of the Lower Canada Church. At a banquet in honour of Bishop Ignace Bourget (himself one of the relatively rare clerics in favour of the Patriotes), Bishop Jean-Jacques Lartigue declared: "Never is it permitted to transgress laws of to revolt against the legitimate authority under which people have the joy of living". Three weeks after the assembly, an arrest warrant for Patriote leaders was issued by the government.

== Proceedings ==
The Six Counties Assembly of October 23–24, 1837, was the most significant Patriote gathering of that year. It was organized by “some of the most turbulent Patriote leaders”: Wolfred Nelson, Cyrille-Hector-Octave Côté, Thomas Storrow Brown, and Amury Girod. Saint-Charles in Montérégie was chosen as the meeting place for its central location for Patriotes from five federated counties: Richelieu, Saint-Hyacinthe, Rouville, Chambly, and Verchères. The county of L'Acadie was admitted on the day of the assembly after requesting inclusion by the other five counties.

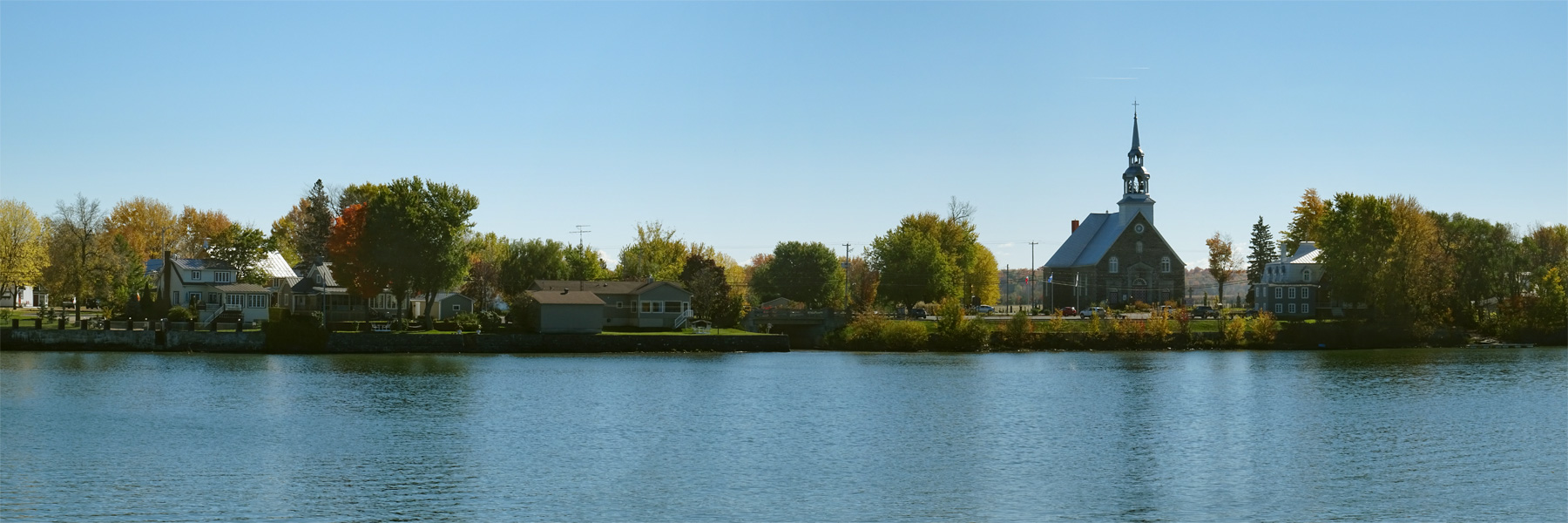
Saint-Charles-sur-Richelieu, viewed from Saint-Marc-sur-Richelieu.

Nearly 5,000 people, including 13 elected Assembly members, attended the assembly, chaired by Wolfred Nelson. On the first day, October 23, Patriote associations were welcomed. A platform was set up on the field of Dr. François Chicou Duvert. Nearby, a Column of Liberty topped with a Phrygian cap was erected, and a plaque was inscribed: “To Papineau, his grateful compatriots, 1837.”

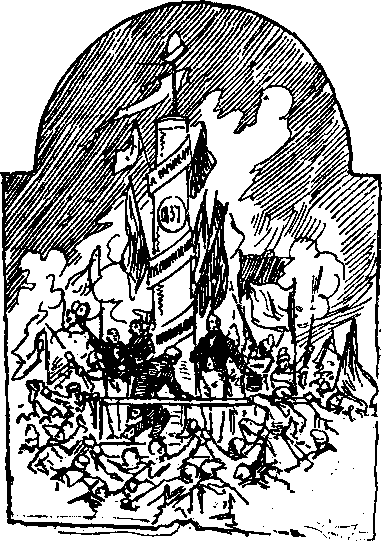
The Column of Liberty, erected during the Six Counties Assembly.

Wolfred Nelson then took the presidential chair, appointing Dr. Duvert and Verchères MP Joseph-Toussaint Drolet as vice-presidents, and Amury Girod and Jean-Baptiste Boucher-Belleville as secretaries. Nelson delivered a particularly radical opening speech, criticizing the Russell Resolutions and advocating violence in response to violence:

The time for speeches is over; now we must send lead to our enemies.

He then introduced Louis-Joseph Papineau, the first speaker of the day. Papineau was greeted by an ecstatic crowd that regarded him as a national hero. However, rather than energizing him, the enthusiastic reception unsettled Papineau. More moderate than Nelson, he felt the president’s speech went too far and worried about the potential radicalization of the movement. Papineau had noticed “hotheads” in the crowd and feared a violent turn. In his speech, Papineau denounced the ministers, government, oligarchy, Councils, and bureaucrats but advocated for an economic boycott rather than armed resistance.

Wolfred Nelson quickly expressed his disapproval. Responding to Papineau, he reiterated the need to radicalize the movement: “Well, I differ with Mr. Papineau, and I believe the time has come to melt our pewter plates to make bullets!” Following speeches by Denis-Benjamin Viger (a member of the Legislative Council), Louis Lacoste (MP for Chambly), and Édouard-Étienne Rodier (MP for L'Assomption), Cyrille-Hector-Octave Côté, MP for L'Acadie, escalated Nelson’s rhetoric with a particularly fiery speech.

Côté’s speech so energized the audience that Édouard Mailhot’s call for Papineau’s moderation was interrupted by the crowd. Finally, Thomas Storrow Brown and Amury Girod concluded the speeches with interventions aligning with Nelson’s stance. The speeches thus highlighted a “dilemma” and a contrast between Papineau’s approach and the more radical Patriote members.

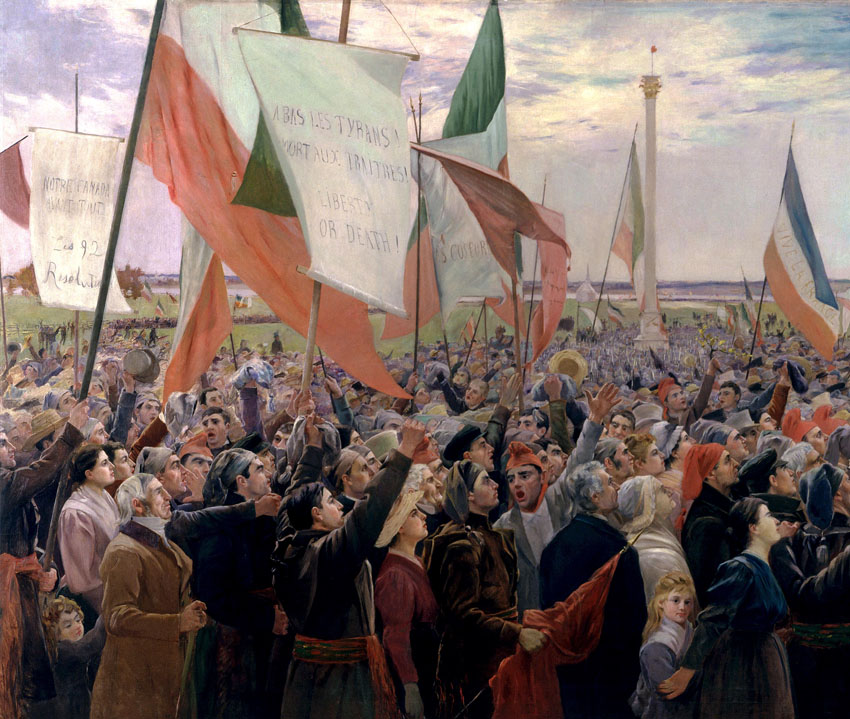
Patriotes at the Six Counties Assembly.

After the speeches, the assembly put forward 13 resolutions prepared by delegates from various Lower Canadian counties. These resolutions proclaimed human rights, denounced the Legislative and Executive Councils of Lower Canada, and endorsed the Sons of Liberty (a paramilitary organization) for defensive purposes. Despite the radical tone of some speeches, the 13 resolutions of Saint-Charles aligned with Papineau’s approach and did not encourage the use of force.

The second day, October 24, was dedicated to adopting an Address of the Six Counties Confederation to the People of Lower Canada and concluded with the announcement of a constituent assembly to draft a new constitution.

== Consequences ==
=== For the Patriote Movement ===
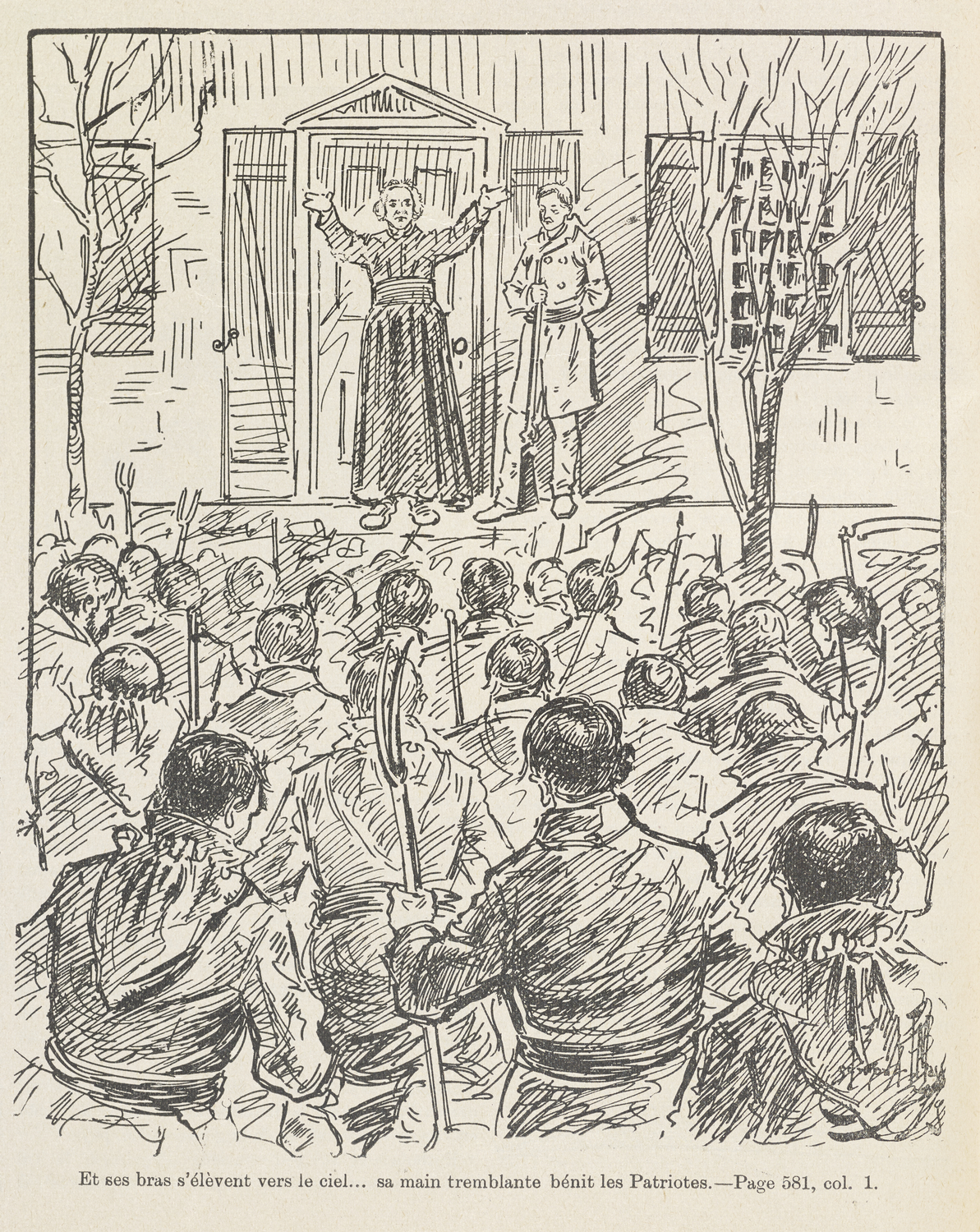
Priest blessing a group of Patriotes, 1837–1838. Original title: “And his arms rose to the sky... his trembling hand blessed the Patriotes.”

The Six Counties Assembly had a significant impact across Lower Canada and was critical for the Patriote movement’s trajectory. For Gilles Laporte, the Patriotes emerged divided, split between moderates and radicals. According to Filteau, the radicals gained momentum after the Saint-Charles gathering, and the moderate faction struggled to contain their revolutionary zeal. Lower Canada was in turmoil, with Montreal newspapers publishing fiery editorials. In the streets, the Sons of Liberty organized, and clashes erupted between Patriotes and their opponents. Movement leaders like Papineau and Viger attempted to moderate their supporters, with little success.

=== Reactions from the opposition ===
In the mid-1830s, opposition to the Patriotes was also organizing. As early as 1834, the year of the 92 Resolutions, “constitutional associations” were formed to defend the 1791 constitution: the St George's Society, the St. Andrew's Society, the St. Patrick's Society, and the German's Society. In January 1835, these groups united under the banner of the Constitutional Association. During the Six Counties Assembly in the fall of 1837, this association became active. Under the leadership of Peter McGill and John Molson, the Constitutional Association met at the Sainte-Anne Market to call for military intervention against the Patriotes.

On November 6, following a confrontation with the Sons of Liberty on Place d'Armes, the Doric Club, a loyalist paramilitary group, attacked Louis-Joseph Papineau’s home, smashing its windows. This prompted historian Gilles Laporte to describe the situation as a “double uprising.” The Canadian clergy also reacted swiftly. The day after the assembly, Jean-Jacques Lartigue, Bishop of Montreal, issued a pastoral letter stating that one must never rebel against “legitimate authority.” British authorities responded by issuing arrest warrants for 26 Patriote leaders on November 16, two weeks after the Saint-Charles gathering.

== Historiographical interpretations ==
Historians broadly agree that the Six Counties Assembly was a precursor to the Patriote rebellion. For Gilles Laporte, historians largely concur that the Saint-Charles Assembly reflects the radicalization of the Patriote movement:

Regarding that fateful day of October 23, 1837, historians are largely in agreement. For Laurent-Olivier David, the term “Patriote” no longer refers to members of a mere political party but to those who choose to engage in armed struggle. For Garneau, it is the moment when political struggle transforms into a call to arms. For Filteau, it is a catastrophe as the Patriotes turn away from constitutional and moderate action, giving the initiative to the most radical elements. For Allan Greer, it is the moment when bourgeois Patriotes reach out to the more radical rural masses. In sum, the Six Counties Assembly represents a turning point: when a political party, for better or worse, begins to transform into a war machine.

== In popular culture ==
=== Comics ===
- In 2012, the Société St-Jean-Baptiste Richelieu-Yamaska, in collaboration with Kaméléon Productions, produced an animated comic. Directed by François Forget, this 28-minute short film outlines the assembly’s key events within a fictional narrative. The film was presented at the Cannes Film Festival in May 2013.

=== Painting ===
- Charles Alexander Smith, The Six Counties Assembly at Saint-Charles-sur-Richelieu, 1837, 1891, oil on canvas, 300.8 by 691.3 centimetres (118.4 in × 272.2 in), Musée national des beaux-arts du Québec, Quebec.

== See also ==
- Patriote popular assemblies
- Patriote movement
- Quebec nationalism
- Quebec independence movement
- History of Quebec
