= Patriote popular assemblies =

Painting of the Assembly of the Six Counties by Charles Alexander Smith, executed in 1890.

The Patriote popular assemblies gathered supporters and leaders of the Patriote movement and the Parti patriote in 1837 Lower Canada. The assemblies, concentrated in the Montreal and Montérégie region, saw votes on resolutions and speeches of some of Lower Canada's most reputed orators.

== History ==
The resolutions and the speeches often protested against the Russell Resolutions and what the Patriotes saw as the injustice of the colonial government that imposed its will by force and without the direct democratic participation of the people. A number of occasions honored Patriote leader Louis-Joseph Papineau. The text of the resolutions were often prepared by members of a permanent central committee in Montreal. Speeches also appealed to either economic boycotts of British products or to an armed uprising. Papineau believed in the former while Wolfred Nelson became a proponent of the latter.

Often, allusions were also made to the great liberty of the United States of America and the possible support for Lower Canada that could arise in the neighbouring republic. The American Revolution was indeed a major influence of the Patriote movement and its rebellion. Ultimately, the United States would be of little help to the coming Lower Canada Rebellion, despite plans by American northeastern citizens to provide weapons and the passive role that country played hosting the Frères chasseurs and the banished and hunted Patriotes (notably Papineau). The USA eventually proclaimed its neutrality and, in January 1838, American President Martin Van Buren even cautioned Americans against providing any assistance or protection to the rebels, declaring that anyone compromising the neutrality of the United States would expose themselves to arrest and punishment.

== See also ==
- List of the public meetings held in Lower Canada between May and November 1837
- Quebec nationalism
- Quebec independence movement
- History of Quebec
- Timeline of Quebec history
