= L'Assemblée des six-comtés (painting) =

Painting by Charles Alexander Smith

The Assembly of the Six Counties, 1890, by Charles Alexander Smith.

L'Assemblée des six-comtés (French for "The Assembly of the Six Counties"), also known as Manifestation des Canadiens contre le gouvernement anglais, à Saint-Charles, en 1837 ("Demonstration of the Canadiens against the British colonial government, at Saint-Charles, in 1837"), is a large oil painting executed on canvas by Ontario artist Charles Alexander Smith in 1890.

It depicts the Assembly of the Six Counties, an event in 1837, part of the history of Quebec and the Patriote movement. It is displayed in the permanent exhibition of the Musée national des beaux-arts du Québec in Quebec City.

== Composition ==
The picture includes many elements of what is known about the Patriote movement and their time. It features a number of Patriote leaders, upon the stage at the right, with accurate appearance. Patriote leader Louis-Joseph Papineau is shown in a speech to the crowd. At the bottom right stand three flags. From the left, the first represents the influence the Patriotes received from the French Revolution, the second is the Patriote flag and the third embodies the admiration of the Patriote for the American Revolution. The Patriote flag remains a visual leitmotiv across the composition.

The right field profusely displays maple leaves, a symbol of the French Canadians of the time (they have now been discarded by their modern-day Québécois and Quebec nationalist successors because of their appropriation by the Canadian federation). In the same section is the Coat of arms of Quebec, leaning upon the wooden stage structure (one anachronistic detail, as this version, contemporary to the painting's execution, is the first arms of Quebec post-Confederation, granted in 1868).

The crowd, mesmerized and invigorated at the same time by Papineau's much celebrated oratory skills, holds many signs reading nationalist and independence slogans. Many in attendance wear the tuques and ceintures fléchées belts characteristic of the Patriote symbology. The Colonne de la liberté stands tall in the background (the one from Henri Julien's illustration and the contemporary replica appear much shorter). Finally, a very young girl at the immediate left-of-the-middle evocatively stares at the spectator.

== History ==
Smith was commissioned to paint it for display in the chamber of the Legislative Assembly in the Parliament of Quebec City. However, the government of Premier of Quebec Charles-Eugène Boucher de Boucherville did not accept it, and the work was passed unto various owners before finally becoming part of the Musée national des beaux-arts du Québec collection.

Located in Room 10, it is a part of the permanent exhibition of Quebec history-related art called Je me souviens : Quand l’art imagine l’histoire ("Je me souviens [motto of Quebec]. When Art Imagines History"). The picture has seen restoration. Nowadays, a great number of books related to the Patriotes, or their era in Quebec, use the painting, often cropped, to illustrate their cover page.

In a similar fashion, initial plans to erect a statue in honour of Louis-Joseph Papineau on the Quebec City Parliament Hill were aborted because of the then-controversial aspect of what was seen as a revolutionary figure. A smaller statue was instead made for interior display in the Parliament and a monument such as the one originally envisioned was inaugurated in the 2000s.

== Subject ==
The Assembly of the Six Counties gathered Patriote leaders and approximately 4,000 followers in Saint-Charles, Lower Canada (present-day Quebec) on October 23 and October 24, 1837. Presided by Wolfred Nelson, it is the most famous of the various popular assemblies held during that year protesting the Russell Resolutions. It was a prelude to the Lower Canada Rebellion of 1837 that sought the independence of a Lower Canadian republic. Speakers were united in their protest of the British colonial government, but, as one part supported economic boycotts of British products, the other appealed to an armed uprising.

== See also ==
- Patriote popular assemblies
- History of Quebec
- Timeline of Quebec history
- Quebec nationalism
- Quebec independence movement
