= Musée national des beaux-arts du Québec =

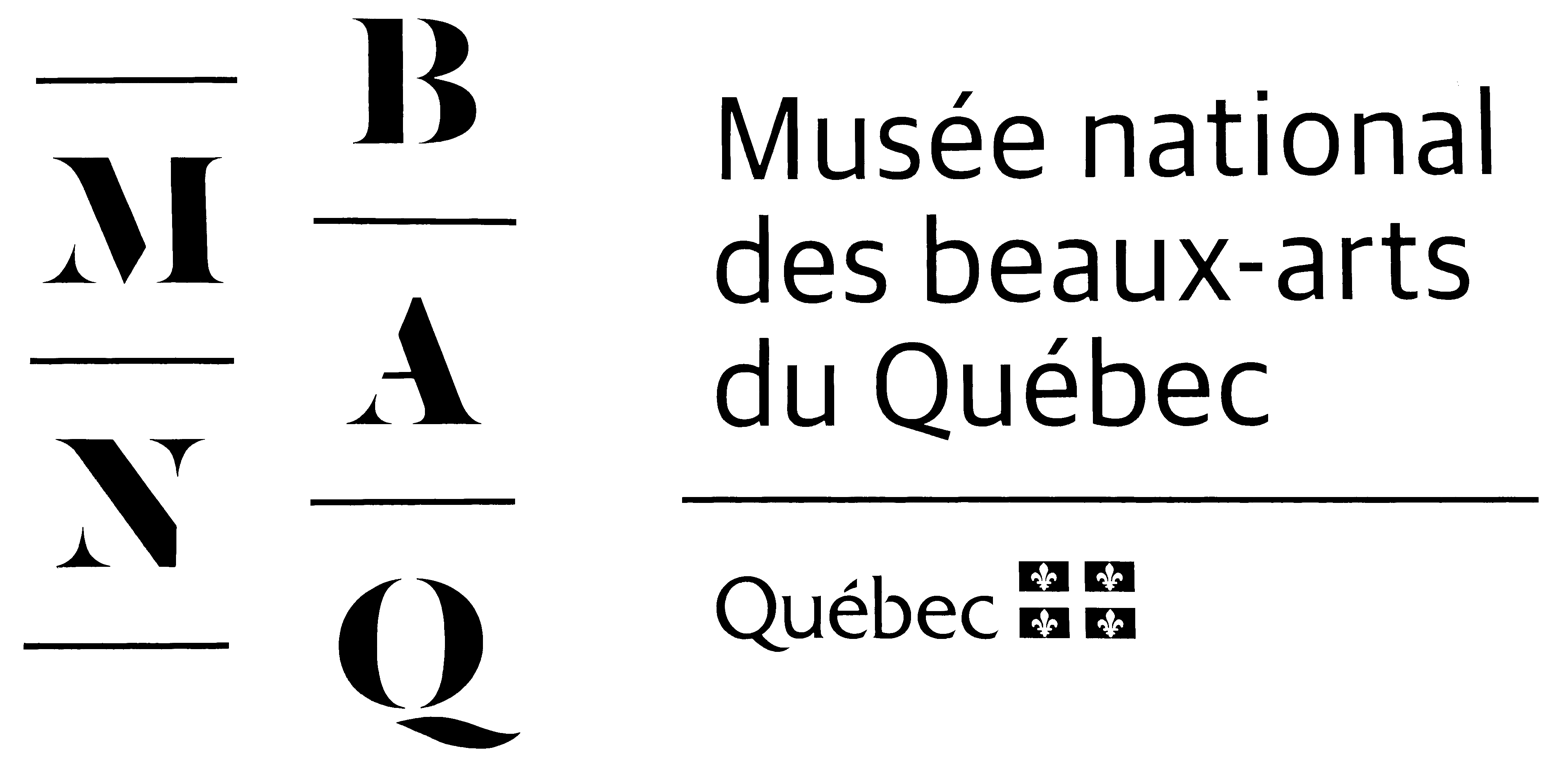

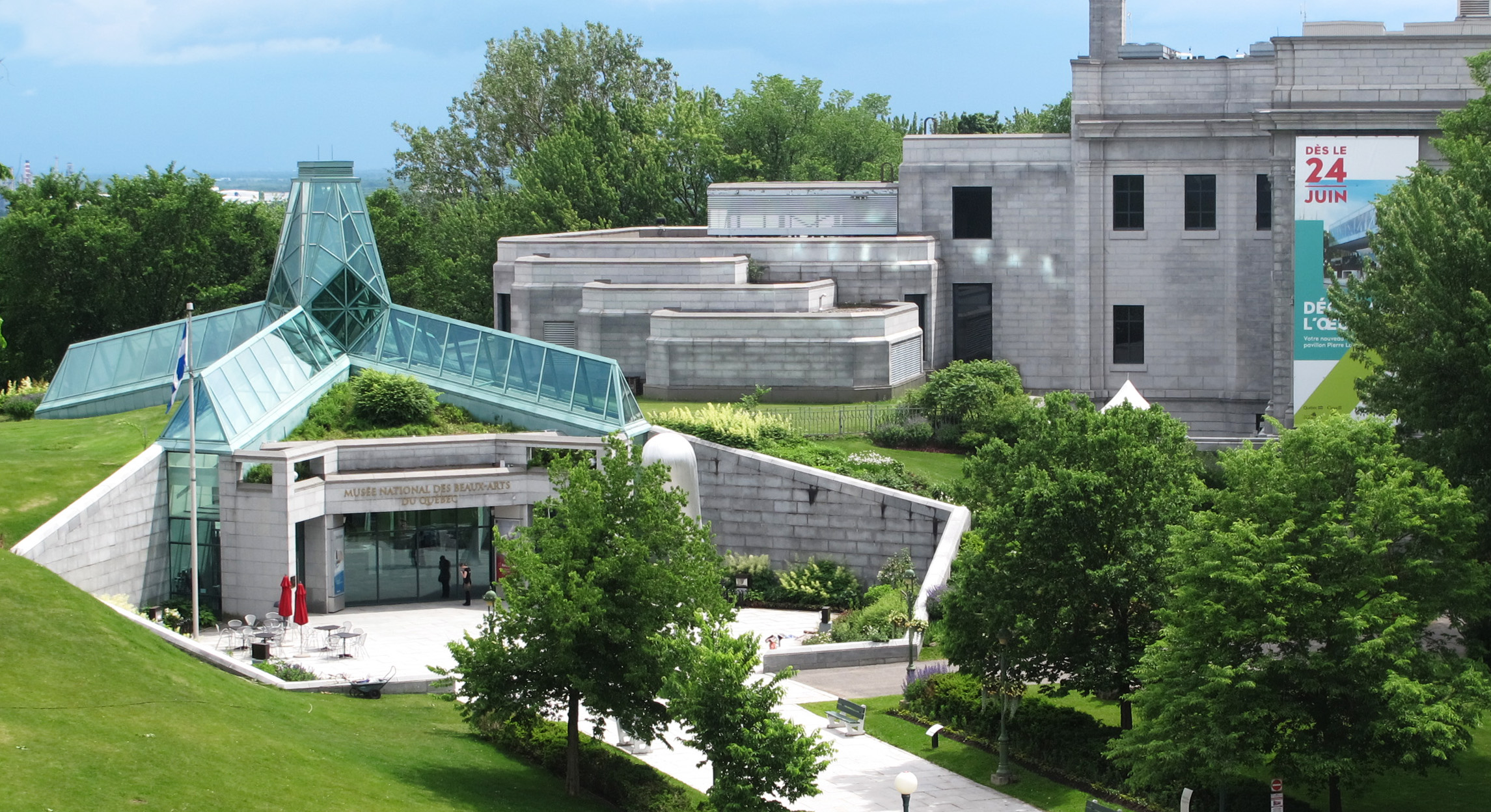
- The Central Pavilion with Gérard-Morisset Pavilon in the background

- Location of Musée national des beaux-arts du Québec in Quebec City
- Former name: Musée de la province de Québec (1933–1963); Musée du Québec (1963–2002)
- Established: 5 June 1933; 93 years ago
- Location: The Battlefields Park, Quebec City, Quebec, Canada
- Coordinates: 46°47′56″N 71°13′29″W
- Type: Art museum
- Visitors: 252,232 (2024–25)
- Director: Anne Élisabeth Thibault
- President: Christiane Germain
- Owner: Government of Quebec
- Website: www.mnbaq.org/en

The Musée national des beaux-arts du Québec (English: National Fine Arts Museum of Quebec), abbreviated as MNBAQ, is an art museum in Quebec City, Quebec, Canada. The museum is located in National Battlefields Park and is a complex of four buildings. Three of them were purpose-built for the museum and one was originally a provincial prison.

The institution was opened as the Musée de la province de Québec in 1933. The museum was a provincial archives, arts, and natural science museum until 1962, when the natural science collection was removed. In the following year, the museum was renamed the Musée du Quebec. The provincial archives were relocated from the museum in 1979, leaving the institution with only an arts collection. In 2002, the museum was renamed the Musée national des beaux-arts du Québec.

The collection includes over 40,000 works from the 16th century to the present day. The collection primarily includes works that were produced in Quebec, or by a Quebec artist, although it also includes works from other parts of Canada, and the rest of the world. The museum is affiliated with the Canadian Museums Association, the Canadian Heritage Information Network, and the Virtual Museum of Canada.

== History ==
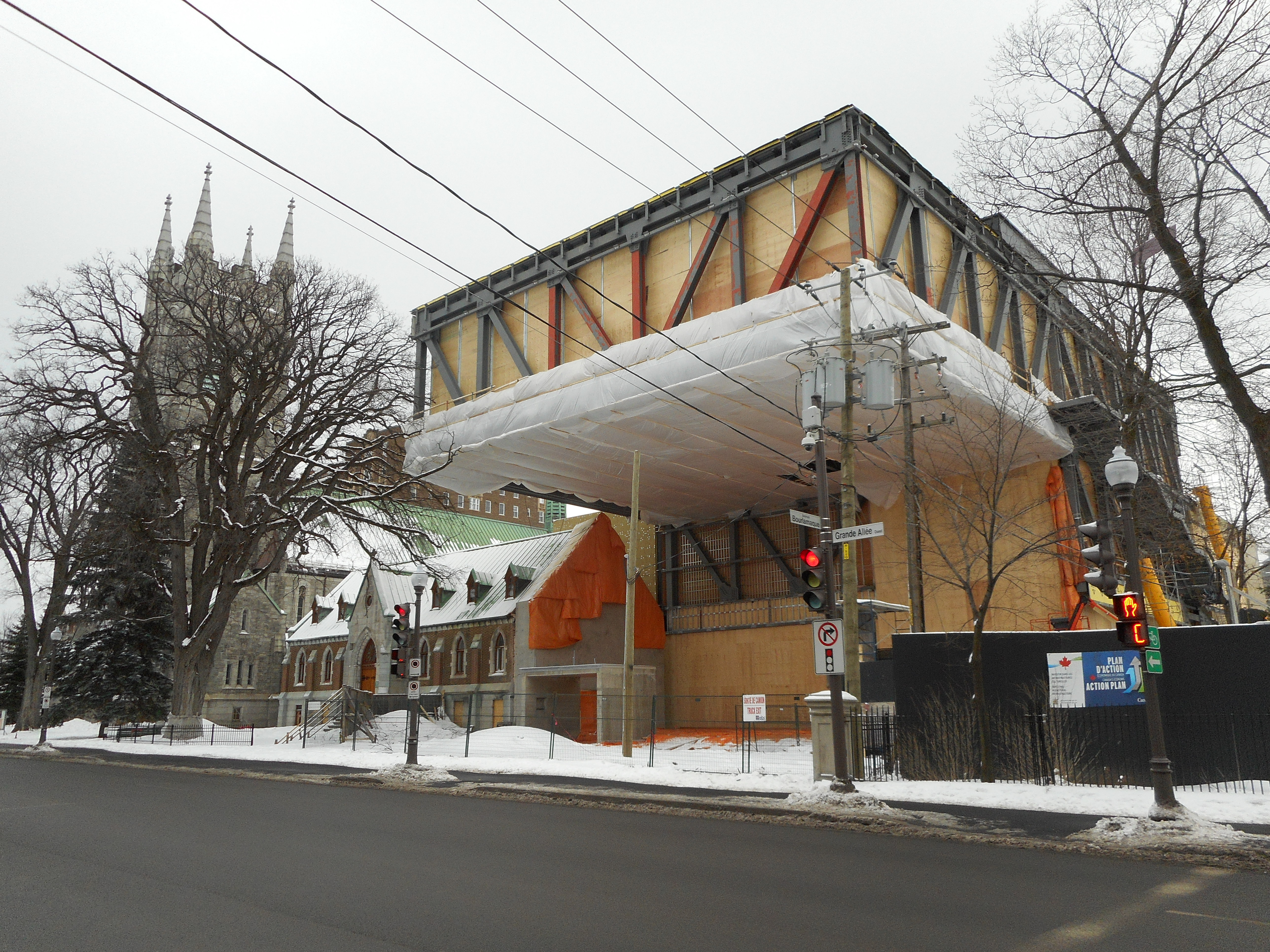
Construction for the Pierre Lassonde Pavilion in 2014

Prior to the establishment of the museum, the province acquired several items and works in order to establish a provincial collection of art and natural history. The premier of Quebec, Lomer Gouin, first proposed the idea of establishing a provincial collection of art as a part of a program to "define the Quebec nation". However, the collections were primarily established and organized under his successor, Louis-Alexandre Taschereau. The program formally began in March 1920, when the cabinet minister, Athanase David, announced an initiative where the province would support Quebec-based artists by purchasing their works. A five-man jury initially selected works for the collection, selecting works they believed pushed the concept of a common rural past, and affirmed "innovative art trends", by artists in Quebec.

In 1922, the legislature of Quebec passed the Loi des musées de la province de Québec (English: Act Respecting Museums in the Province of Quebec), providing funding for the construction of museums throughout the province. However, construction for the Gérard-Morisset Pavilion did not begin until 1928; the museum finally opened to the public in June 1933. Initially, the institution served as an art, natural science museum, and provincial archive.

The natural history collection was removed from the museum in 1962, and the institution was renamed Musée du Québec the following year. The provincial archives moved from the museum to Université Laval in 1979, leaving the institution with only its art collection. The institution was formally made into a provincial Crown corporation in 1983.

From 1989 to 1991, the museum renovated its original building, and expanded the building complex with the acquisition of the Charles Baillairgé Pavilion. The acquisition and renovation of the former prison building more than doubled the surface space the museum had. The renovation of the former prison expanded the museum's viewing space to 12 galleries, and provided space for an auditorium, a giftshop, restaurant, storerooms, and workshops. The museum's sculpture garden was completed shortly after the Charles Baillairginé Pavilion opened in 1993.

In 2002, the museum was renamed the Musée national des beaux-arts du Québec. Construction for the Pierre Lassonde Pavilion began in 2013 and opened to the public in 2016. The newest pavilion, the Espace Riopelle - Pavillon Michael Audain, is permanently dedicated to the work of Jean-Paul Riopelle. It opened in October 2026.

== Grounds ==
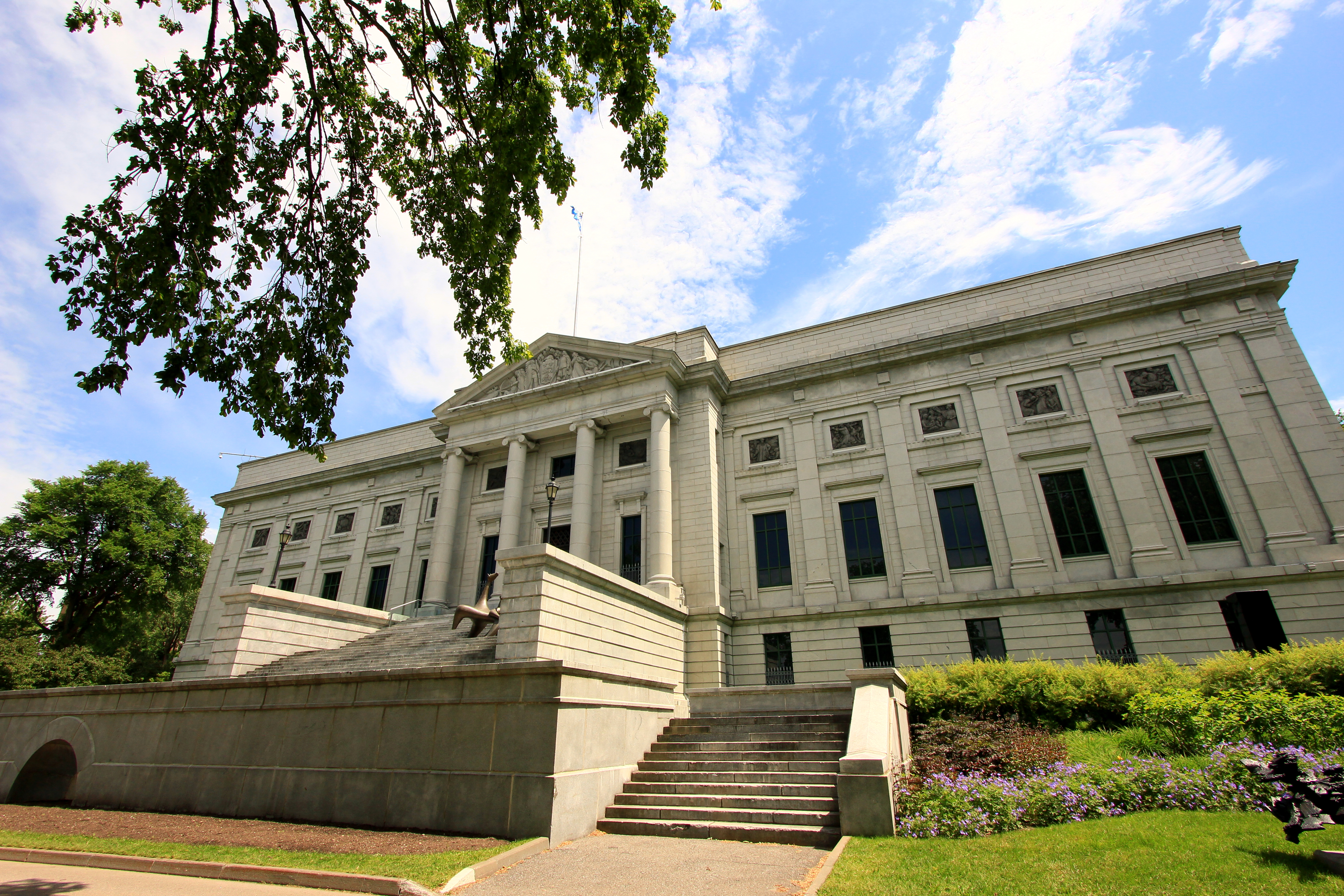
The Gérard-Morisset Pavilion was the first building used by the museum

The property is situated in Battlefield Park, with the museum complex made up of four buildings, the Gérard-Morisset Pavilion, the Charles Baillairgé Pavilion, the Pierre Lassonde Pavilion, and the Central Pavilion/Grand Hall. A tunnel network connects the pavilions.

=== Gérard-Morisset Pavilion ===
The Gérard-Morisset Pavilion was the first building built for the museum. Work on the building began in May 1928 and was completed in early 1931. Wilfrid Lacroix designed the building in a Beaux-Arts style and Joseph-Émile Brunet sculpted the reliefs on the facade. The building was opened to the public in June 1933. The building features white marble, wide Victorian style steps, and carved ceilings. In 2018, the museum completed renovations of the Gérard-Morisset Pavilion, which saw the brightening of its viewing spaces, as well as harmonizing the structure with the rest of the museum complex.

=== Charles Baillairgé Pavilion ===
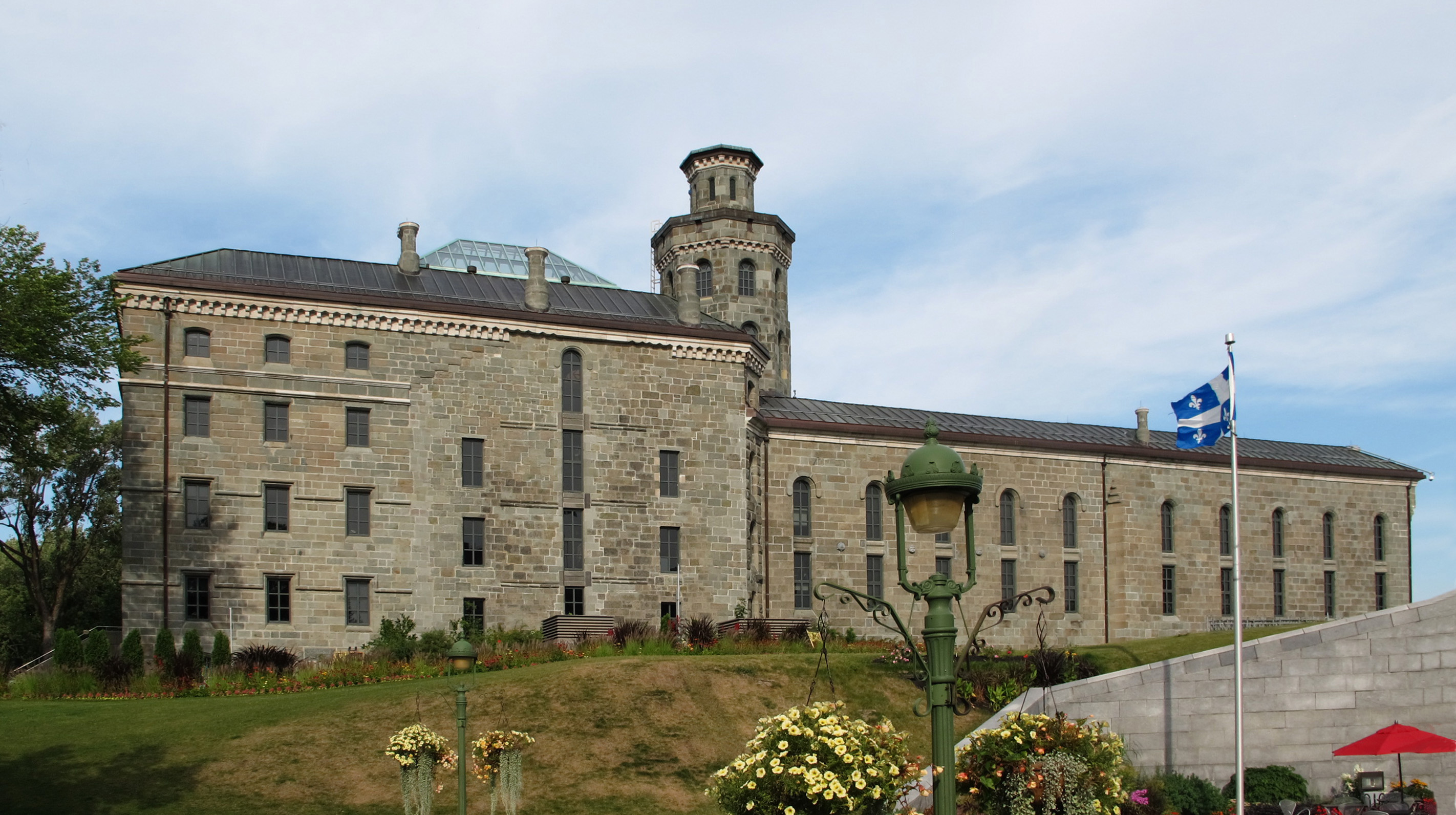
Charles Baillairgé Pavilion was formerly a prison that was later re-purposed by the museum

The Charles Baillairgé Pavilion is the second building that the museum occupied, although its age predates the other buildings in the museum complex. Charles Baillairgé designed the pavilion in 1867 for use as a prison. The design was modelled after the Auburn Correctional Facility, in Auburn, New York. The building housed inmates until 1970.

Shortly after acquiring the property, the museum underwent a two-year renovation beginning in 1989. The renovations led to the creation of four exhibition galleries within the pavilion, and a section of preserved jail cells to highlight the building's former use as a prison. Designs for the renovation were by Charles Dorval and Louis Fortin. Along with the building, Dorval and Fortin also designed the underground access that connected the Gérard Morisset pavilion with the Charles Baillairgé pavilion. In an effort to maintain the Battlefield Park, the design concealed a section of the new wing under the park's natural landscaping. The museum opened the pavilion to the public in May 1991.

=== Central Pavilion ===
The glass-facade pyramid, known as the Central Pavilion or Grand Hall, was built during the 1989–1991 renovations of the museum complex, and was also designed by Dorval and Fortin. The Central Pavilion lies in between the Gérard-Morisset Pavilion and the Charles Baillairgé Pavilion. It serves as the museum's visitor centre. The pavilion was dismantled ahead of the construction of the Espace Riopelle - Michael Audain Pavilion.

=== Pierre Lassonde Pavilion ===
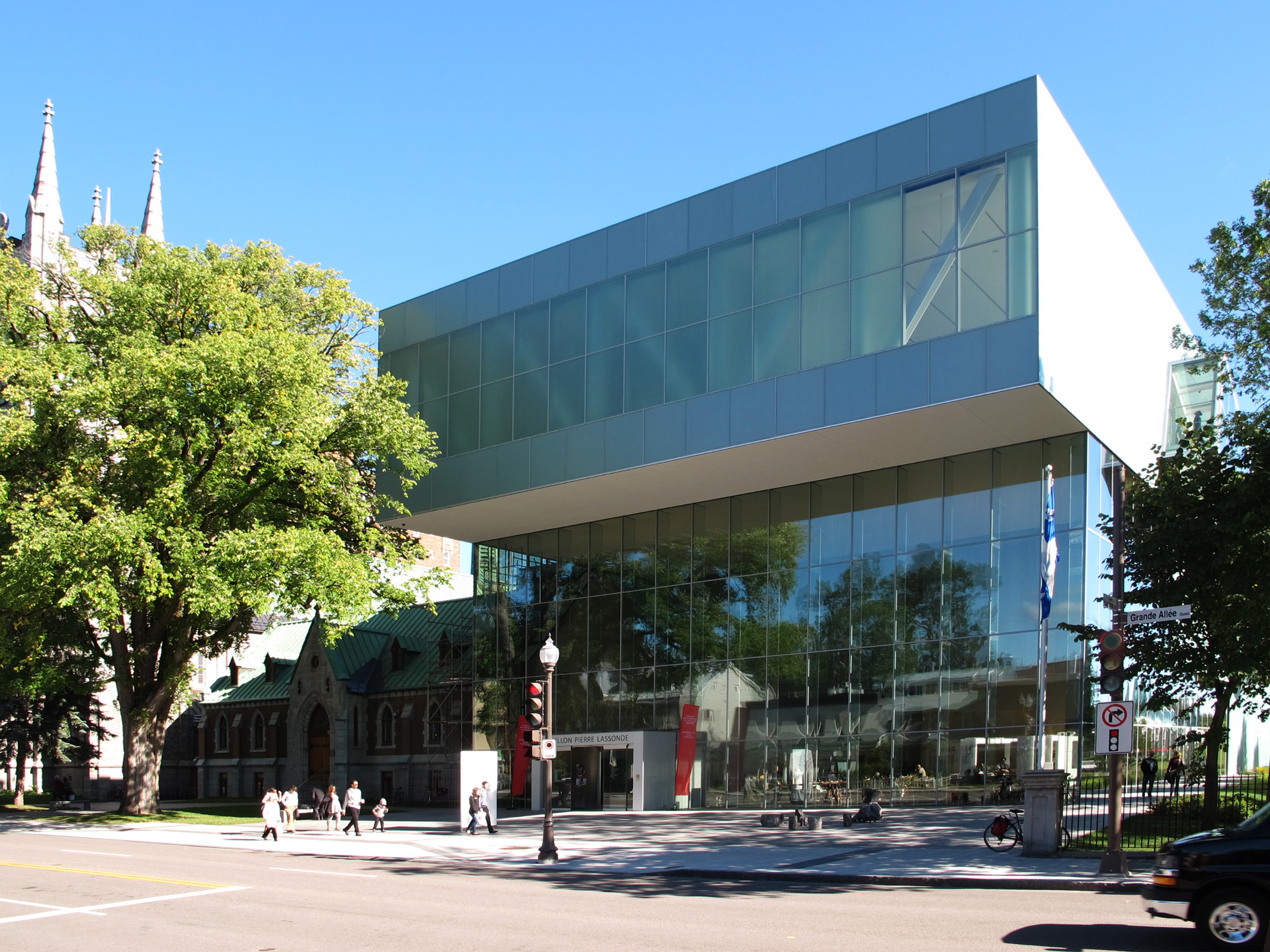
The Pierre Lassonde Pavilion in 2016, three years after its opening

Construction of the Pierre Lassonde Pavilion began in 2013, with the building opened to the public in June 2016. The pavilion has a glass-enclosed access point from Grande Allée to the rest of the museum complex further within Battlefield Park. The Office for Metropolitan Architecture designed the 14,900 square metres (160,000 sq ft) pavilion, with the lead partners being Jason Long and Shohei Shigematsu. During the construction of the building, renovations were also undertaken to the museum's tunnel system, transforming them into viewing spaces. The pavilion largely uses glass and steel for its building material, in an effort to foster transparency between the museum and the general public. The building is adjacent to Saint-Dominique Church.

The total cost of building the pavilion was approximately C$103.4 million. The pavilion features 2,741 square metres (29,500 sq ft) of gallery space; and also includes a café in its main lobby, a courtyard adjacent to the lobby, a white spiral staircase, and a gold-coloured elevator. The building was named after Pierre Lassonde, a benefactor of the museum. The colouring of the gold elevator was chosen to reflect Lassonde's work with gold.

=== Espace Riopelle - Michael Audain Pavilion ===
The new pavilion, erected in place of the previous Central Pavilion, is dedicated to the permanent exhibition of Jean-Paul Riopelle's works and was partly financed through the contribution of philanthropist Michael Audain. Its third and uppermost storey's sole exhibition space consists of the display of the artist's Hommage à Rosa Luxembourg.

At its opening, the pavilion displayed about 130 paintings, sculptures and works on paper by Riopelle alongside roughly 100 works by other Quebec artists. Designed by FABG Architectes, the three-storey building covers more than 5,000 square metres.

== Permanent collection ==
As of March 2019, the museum's permanent collection includes 40,000 works from 4,524 different artists from Quebec, the rest of Canada, and around the world from the 16th century to present day. The legislative act that governs the institutions notes that the museum's purpose is to promote, and preserve art from Quebec, from all periods in history, as well as ensure a presence for international art. The museum's permanent collection was acquired through donations, purchases, or ordered directly from the artist/collector/merchant. The first works acquired for the collection were from the Art Association of Montreal's 37th Spring Exhibition in 1920, although only six pieces purchased from the exhibition remain in the museum's permanent collection.

Each pavilion in the museum complex houses a different department of the museum's collection. Gérard-Morisset Pavilion houses the museum's historical art collection; the Charles Baillairgé Pavilion houses works of modern art, while the Pierre Lassonde Pavilion houses works of contemporary art.

=== Selected works ===
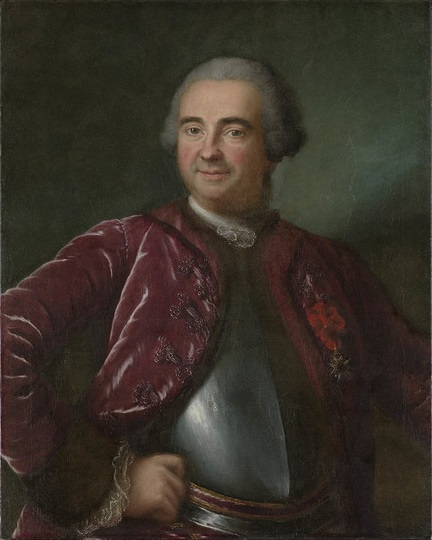
Unknown, Gaspard-Joseph Chaussegros de Léry, c. 1718

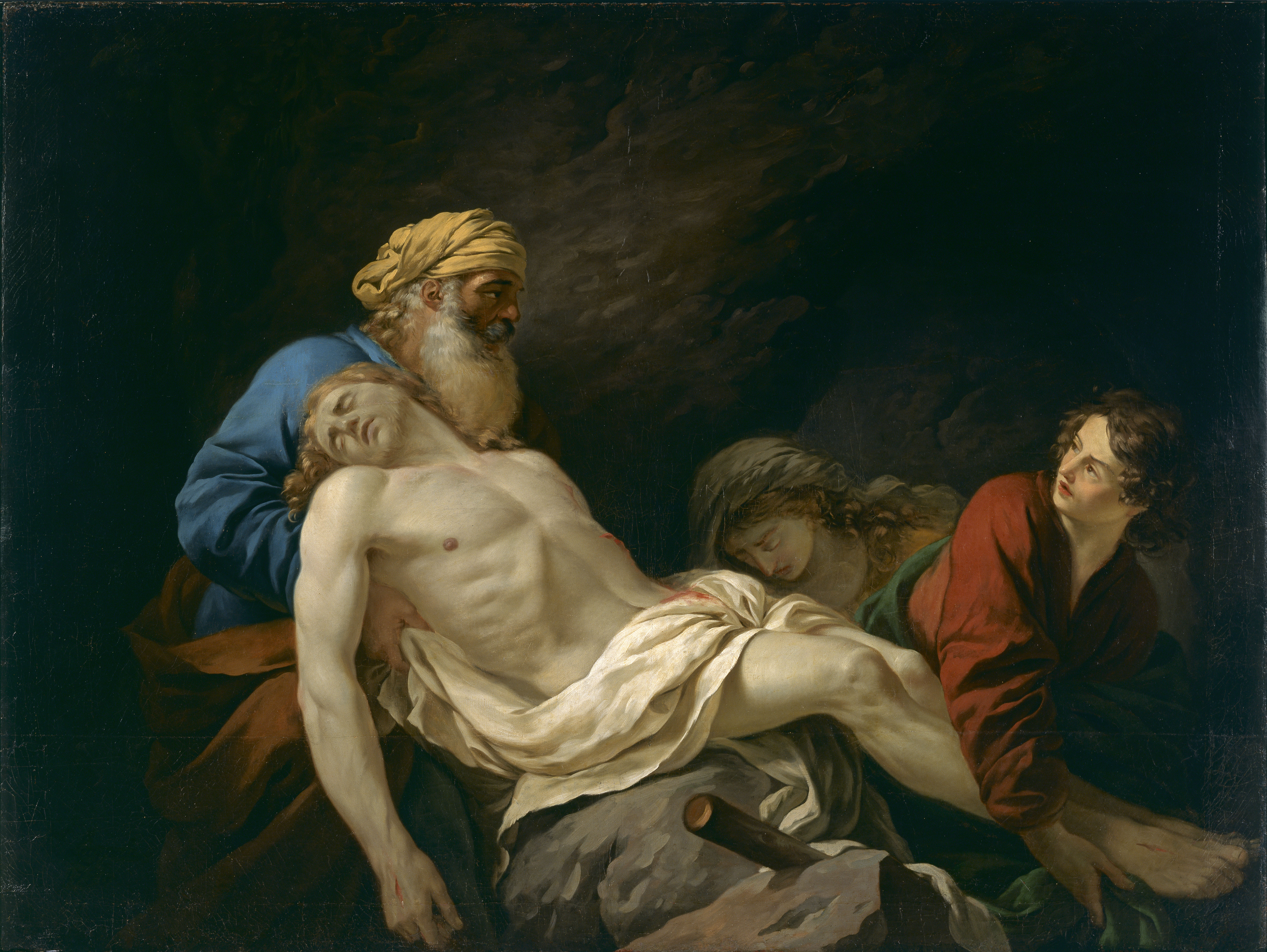
Jean-Jacques Lagrenée, La Mise au tombeau, 1770

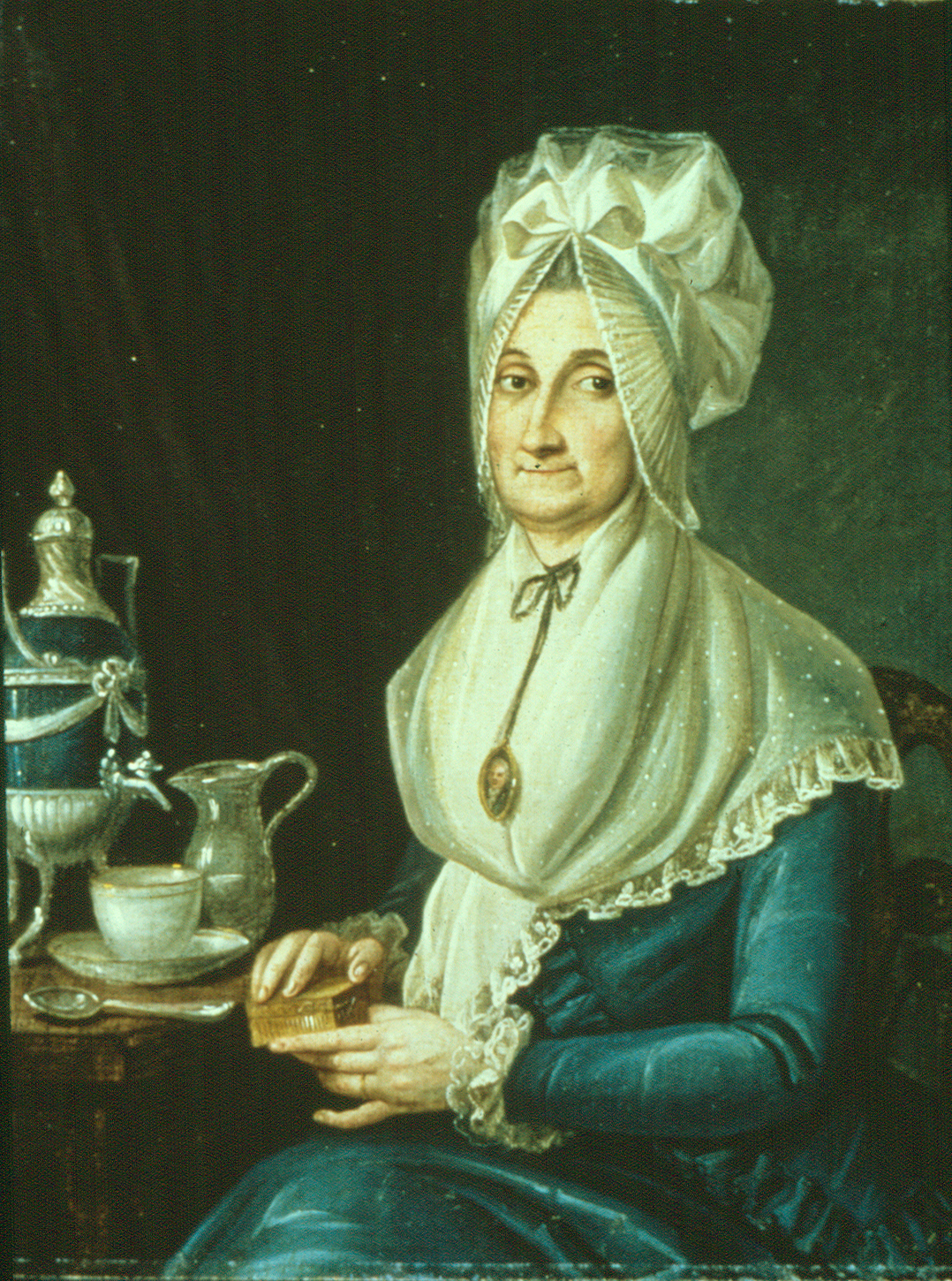
François Beaucourt, Madame Eustache Trottier Desrivières Beaubien, née Marguerite Malhiot, 1793

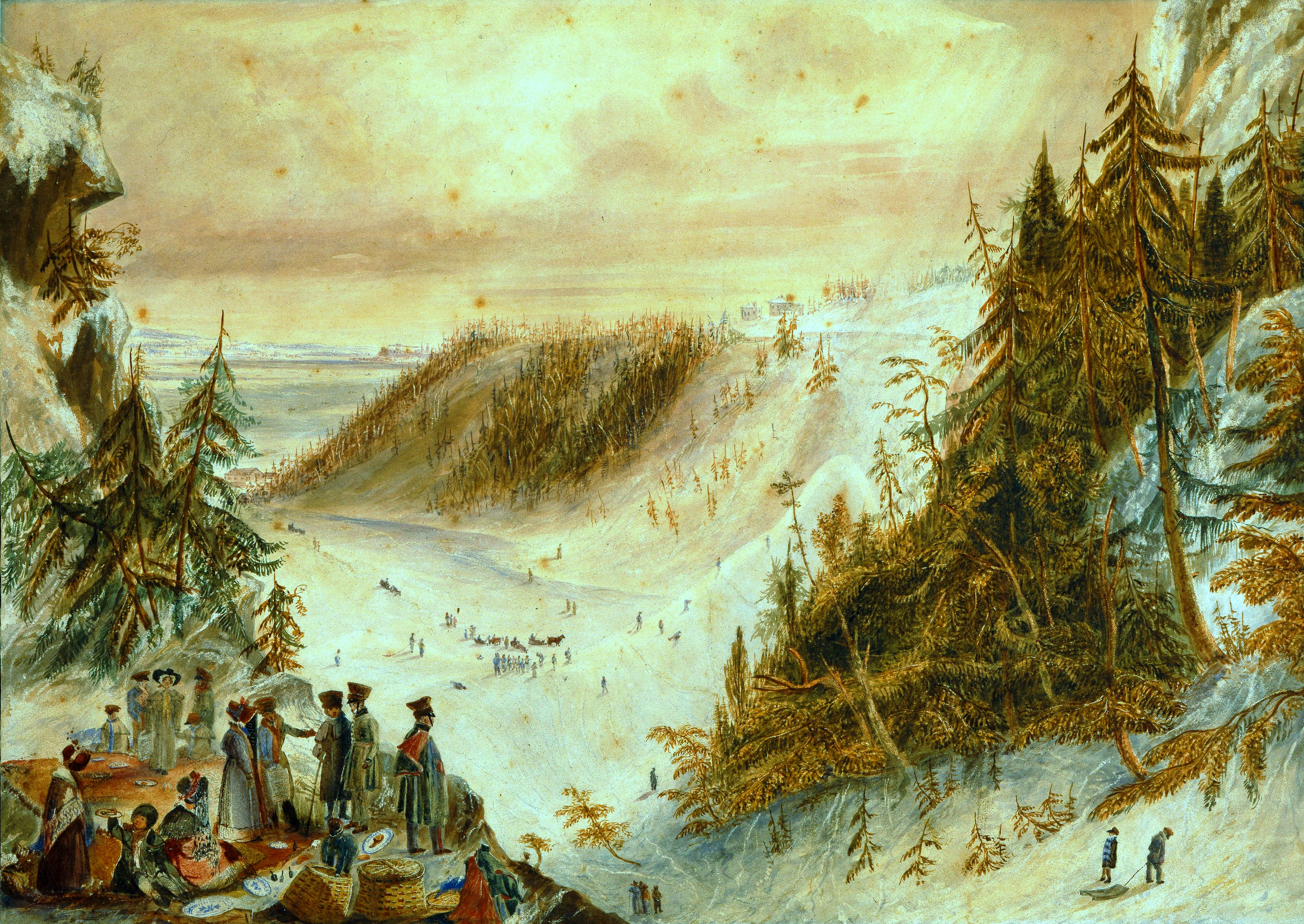
James Pattison Cockburn, The Ice Cone at Montmorency Falls. c. 1830

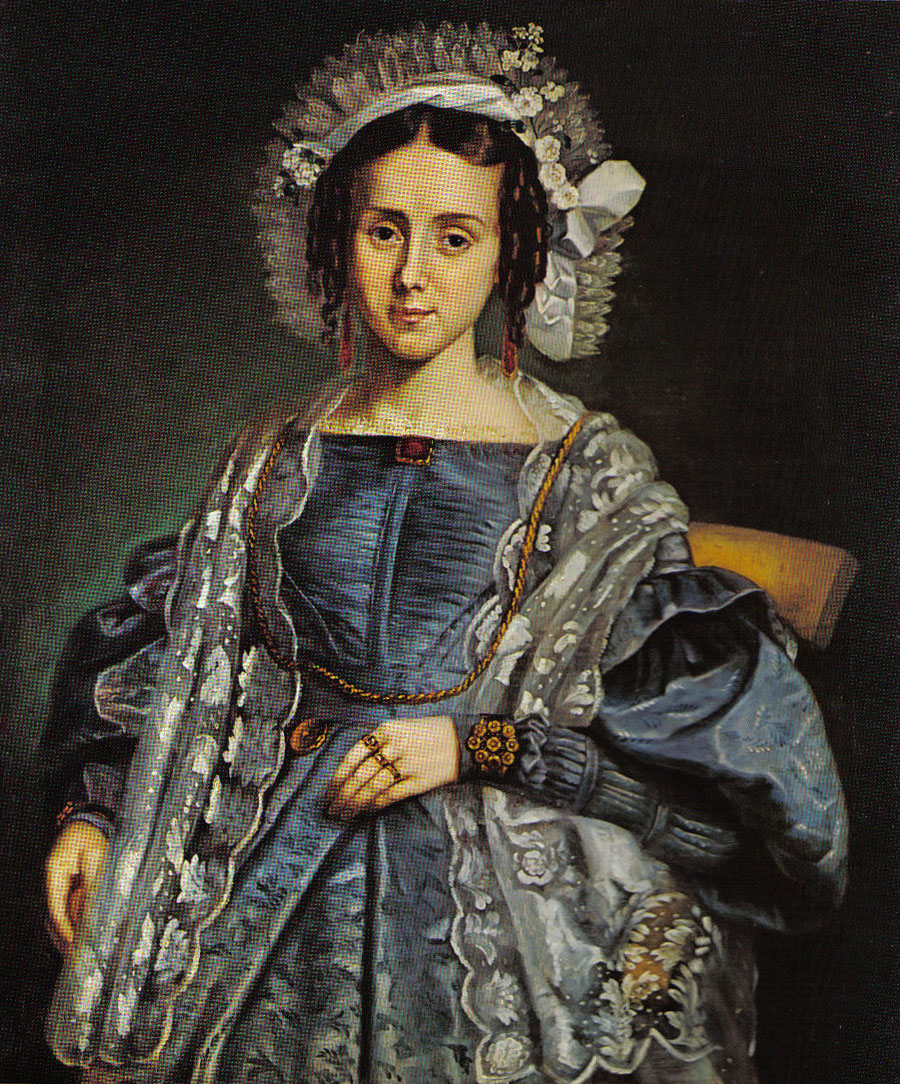
Antoine Plamondon, Madame Joseph Laurin, née Marie-Louise Dalaire, 1839

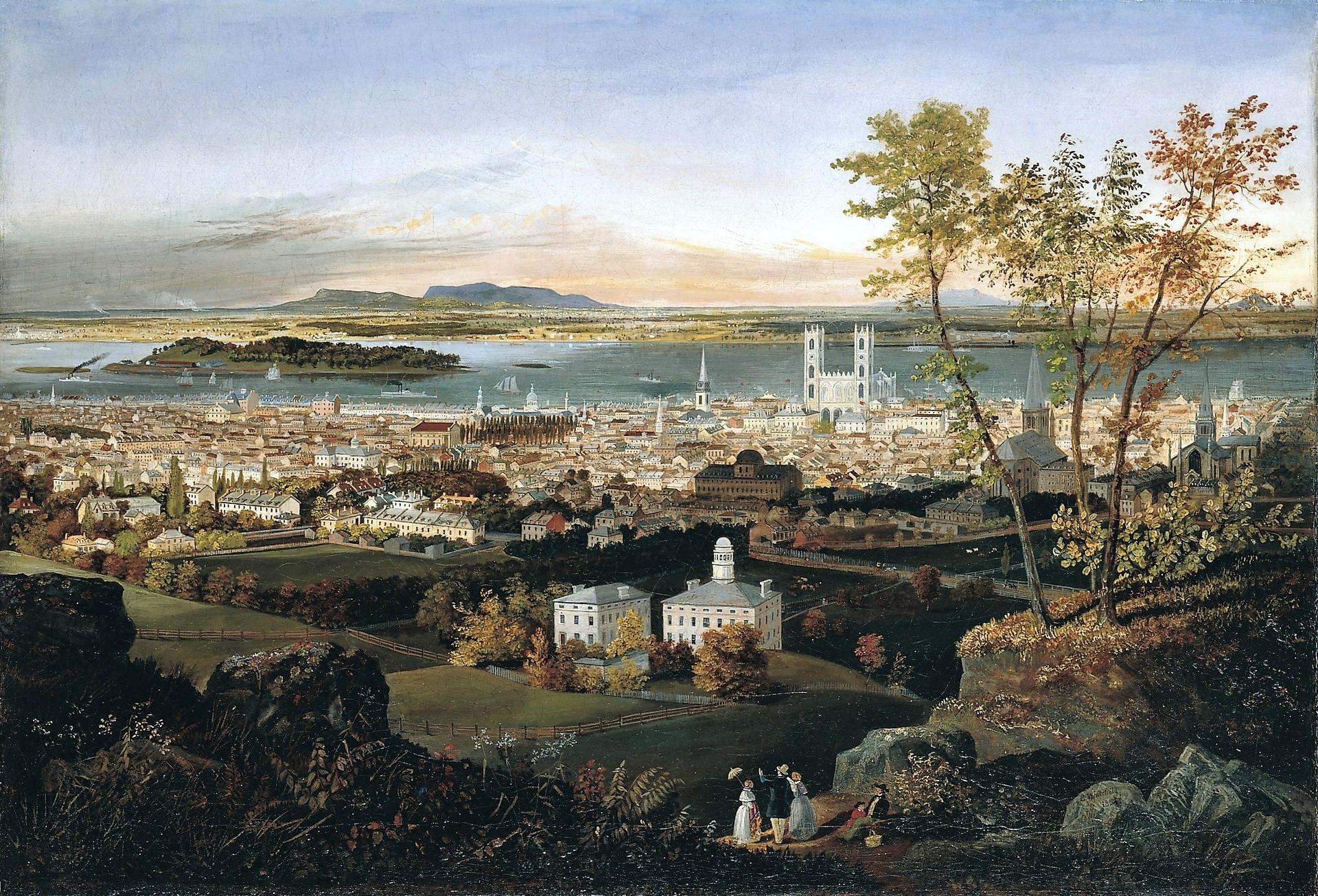
Edwin Whitefield, Montréal vu du mont Royal, 1853–54

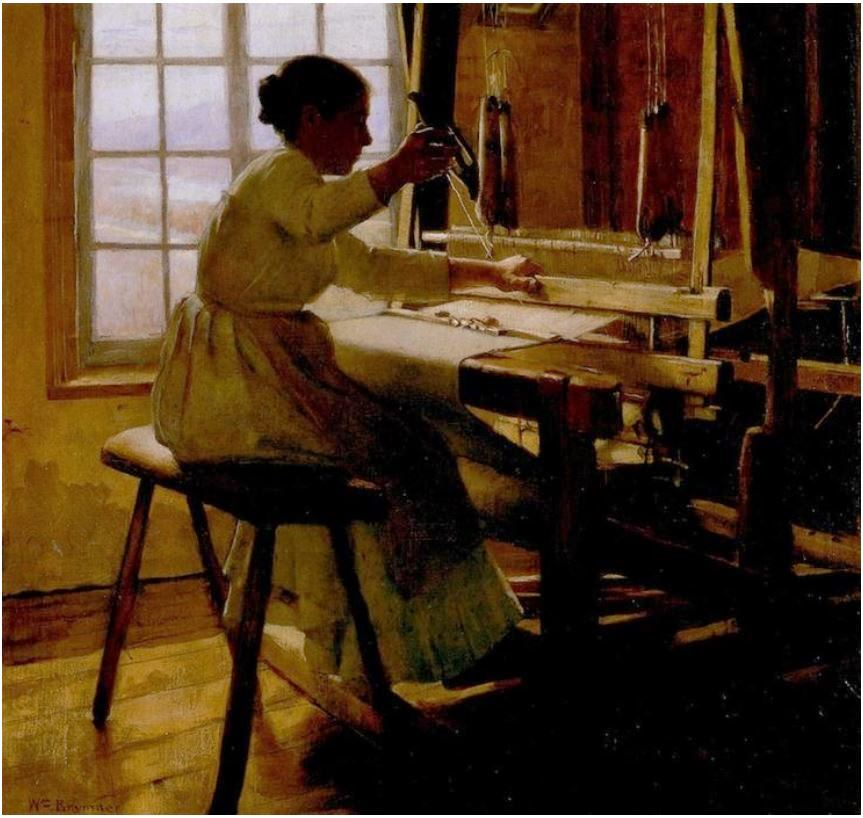
William Brymner, Femme en train de tisser/La Femme au métier/Woman at Work, 1885

Charles Alexander Smith, L'Assemblée des six comtés à Saint-Charles-sur-Richelieu, en 1837, 1891

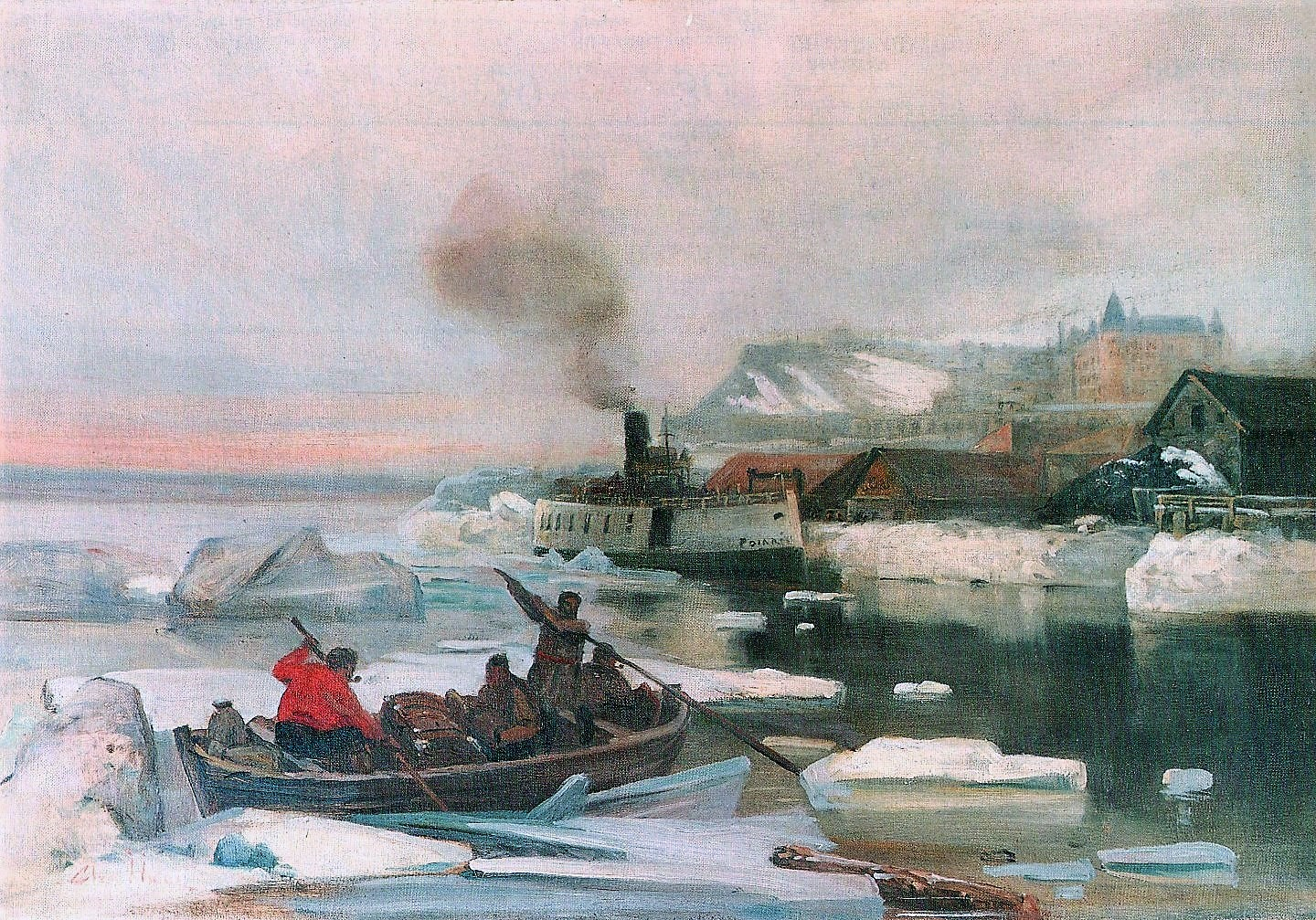
Charles Huot, La Traversée du fleuve en hiver, c. 1902

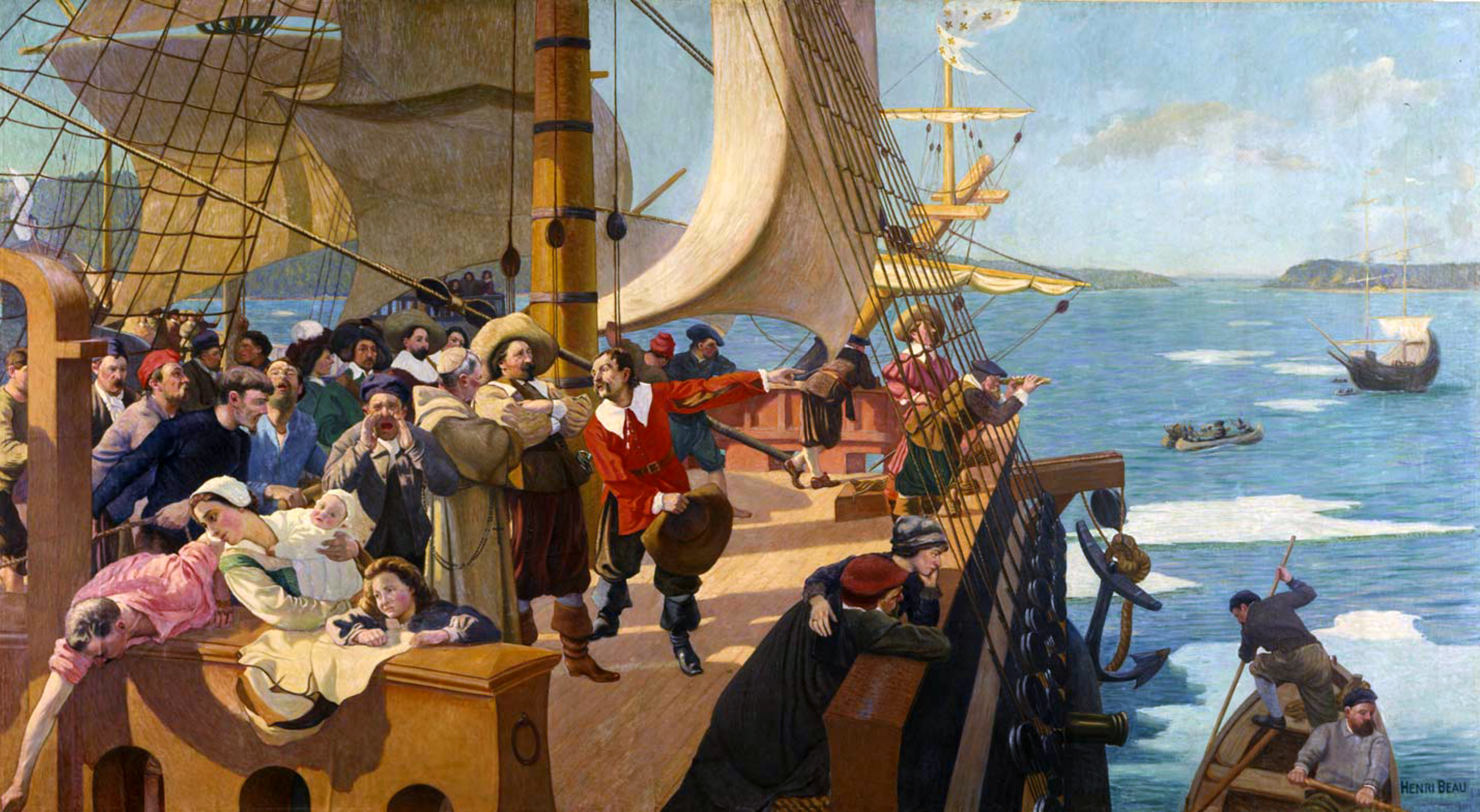
Henri Beau, L'arrivée de Champlain à Québec, 1903

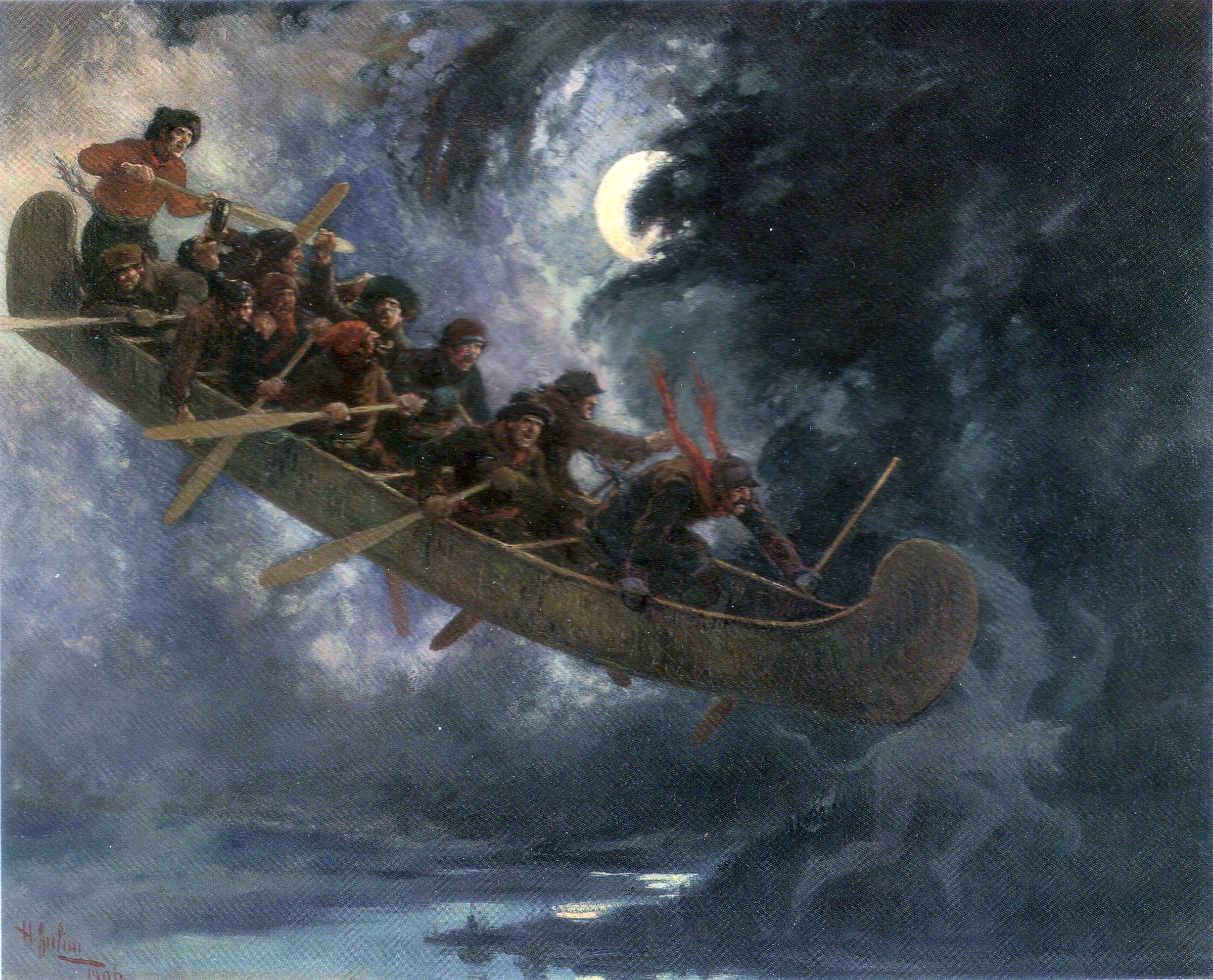
Henri Julien, La Chasse-galerie, 1906

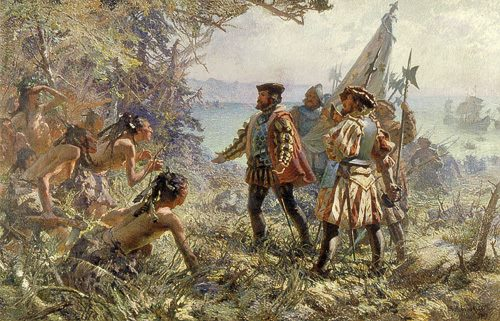
Marc-Aurèle de Foy Suzor-Coté, Jacques Cartier rencontre les Indiens à Stadaconé, 1535, 1907

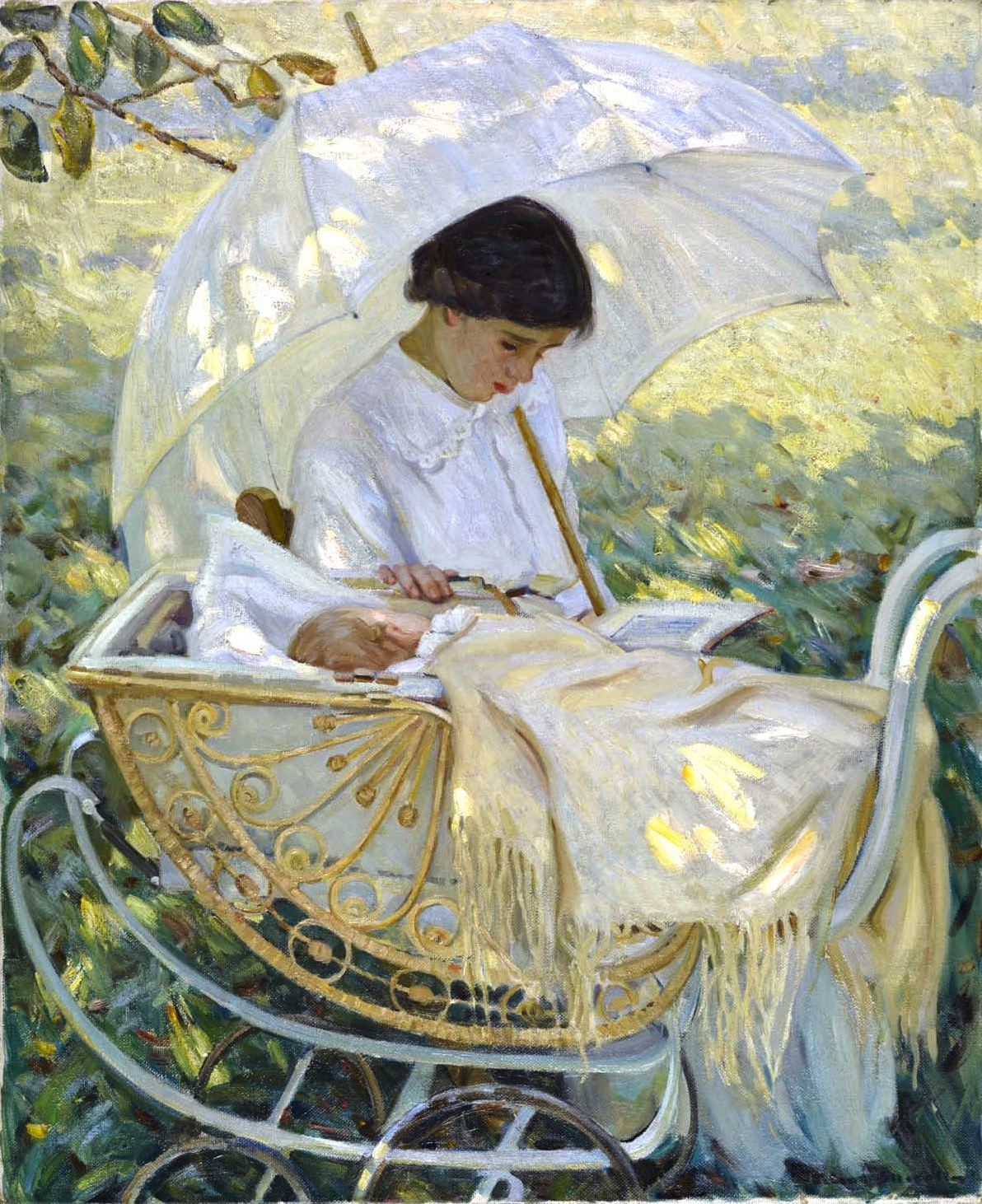
Helen McNicoll, À l'ombre de l'arbre/In the Shadow of the Tree, c. 1910

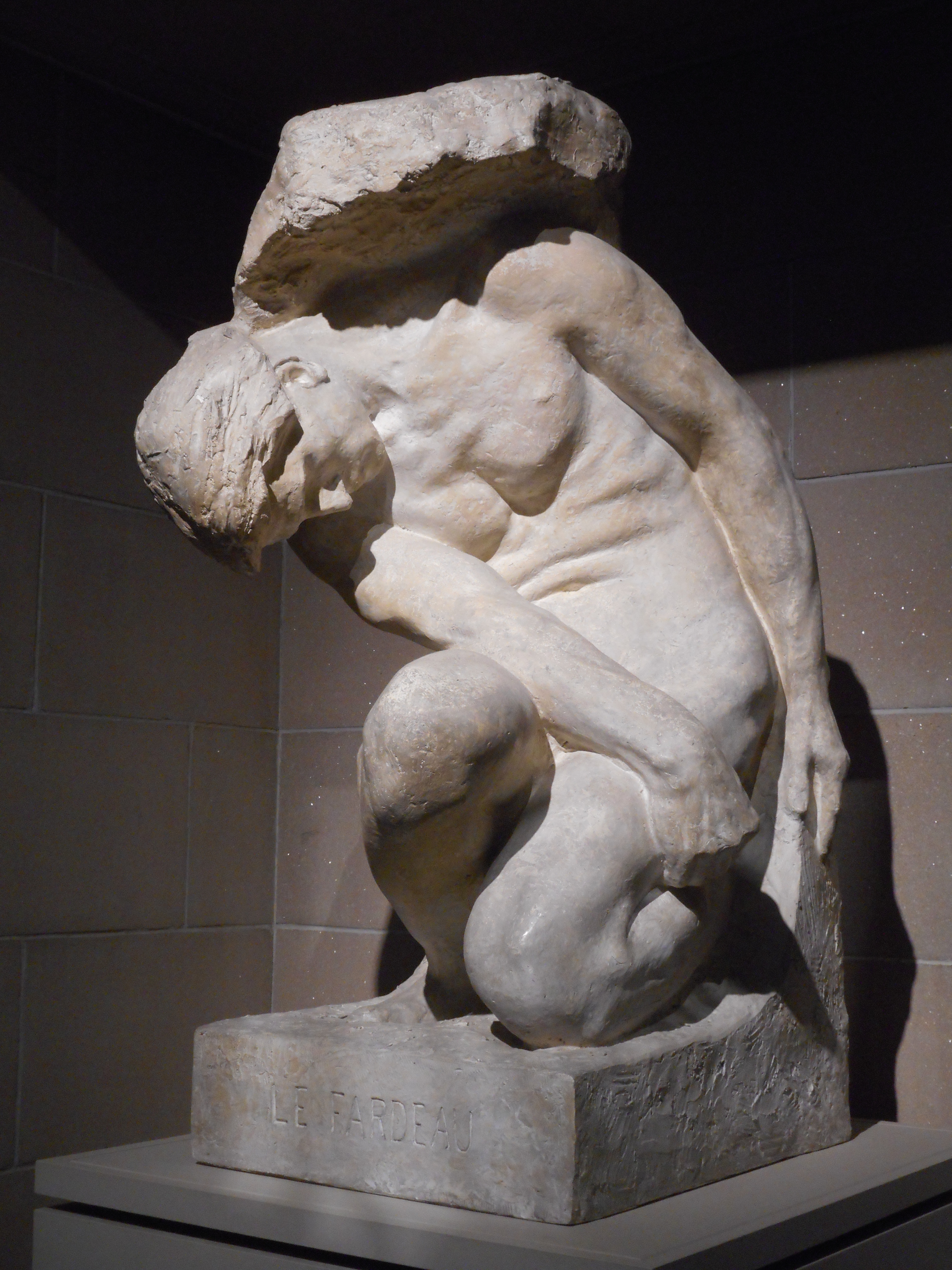
Alfred Laliberté, Le Fardeau, c. 1925

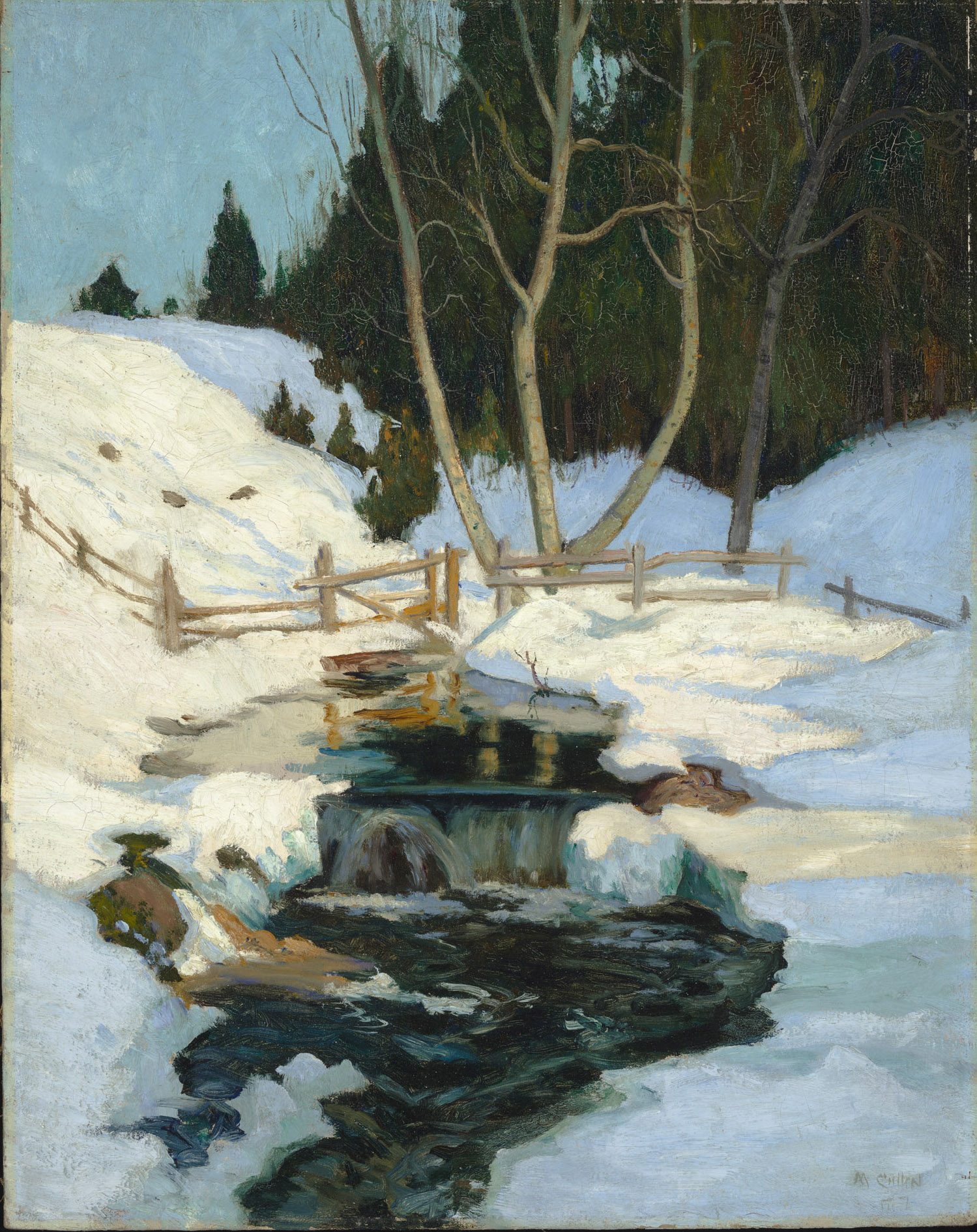
Maurice Cullen, La Fonte des neiges, 1930

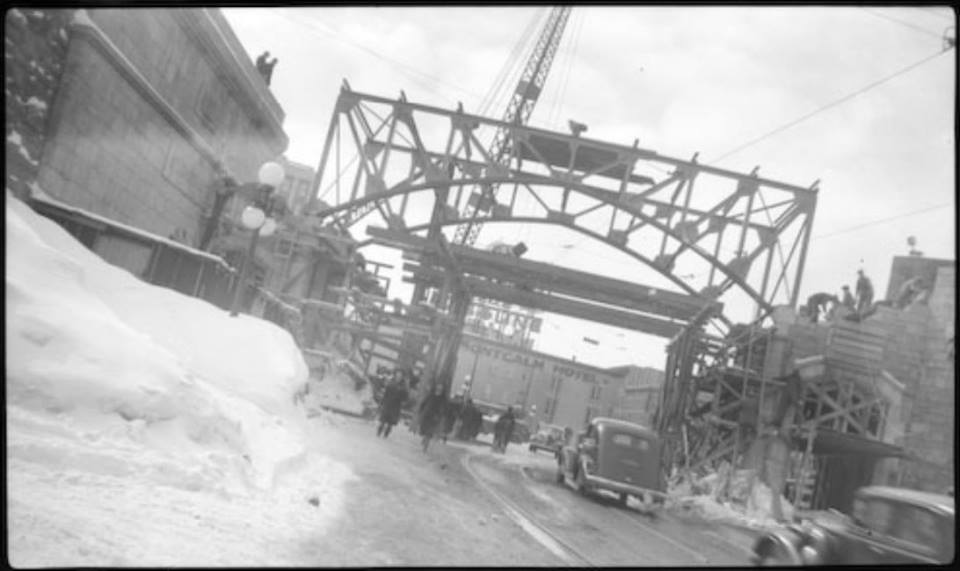
Unknown, La Construction de la porte Saint-Jean, Québec, c. 1938–39

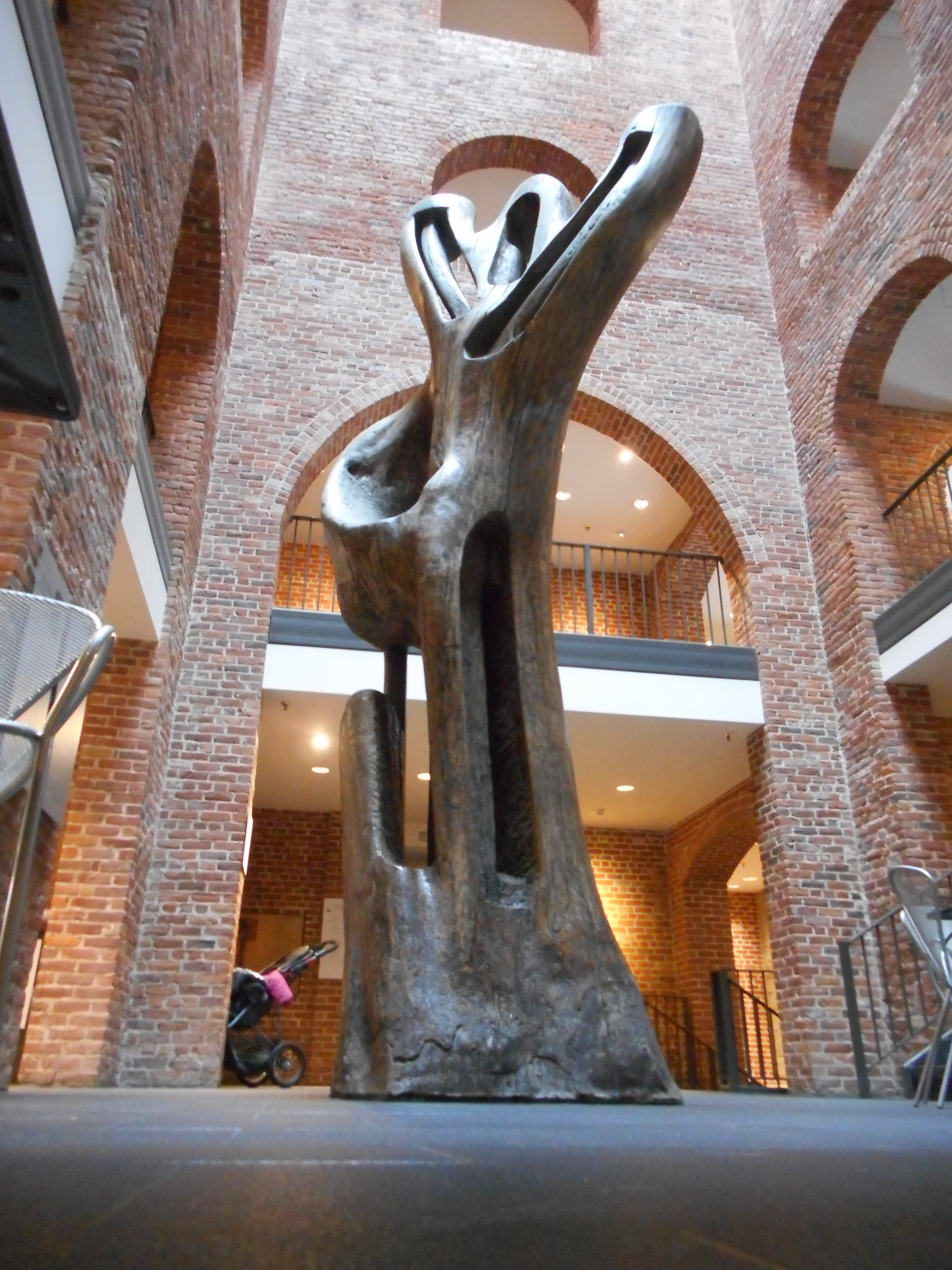
Armand Vaillancourt, L'Arbre de la rue Durocher, 1953–1956

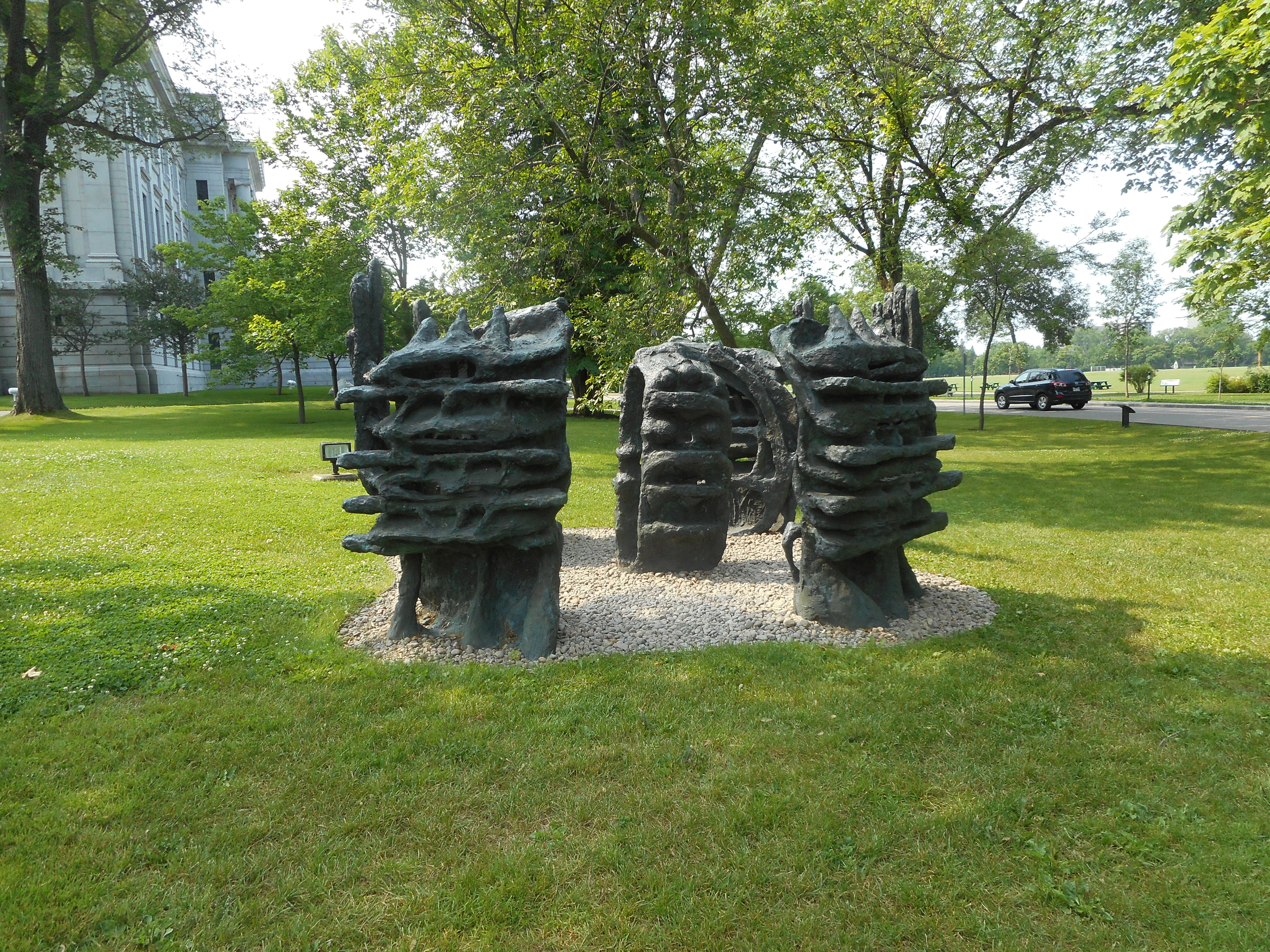
Étienne Martin, Demeure III, 1960

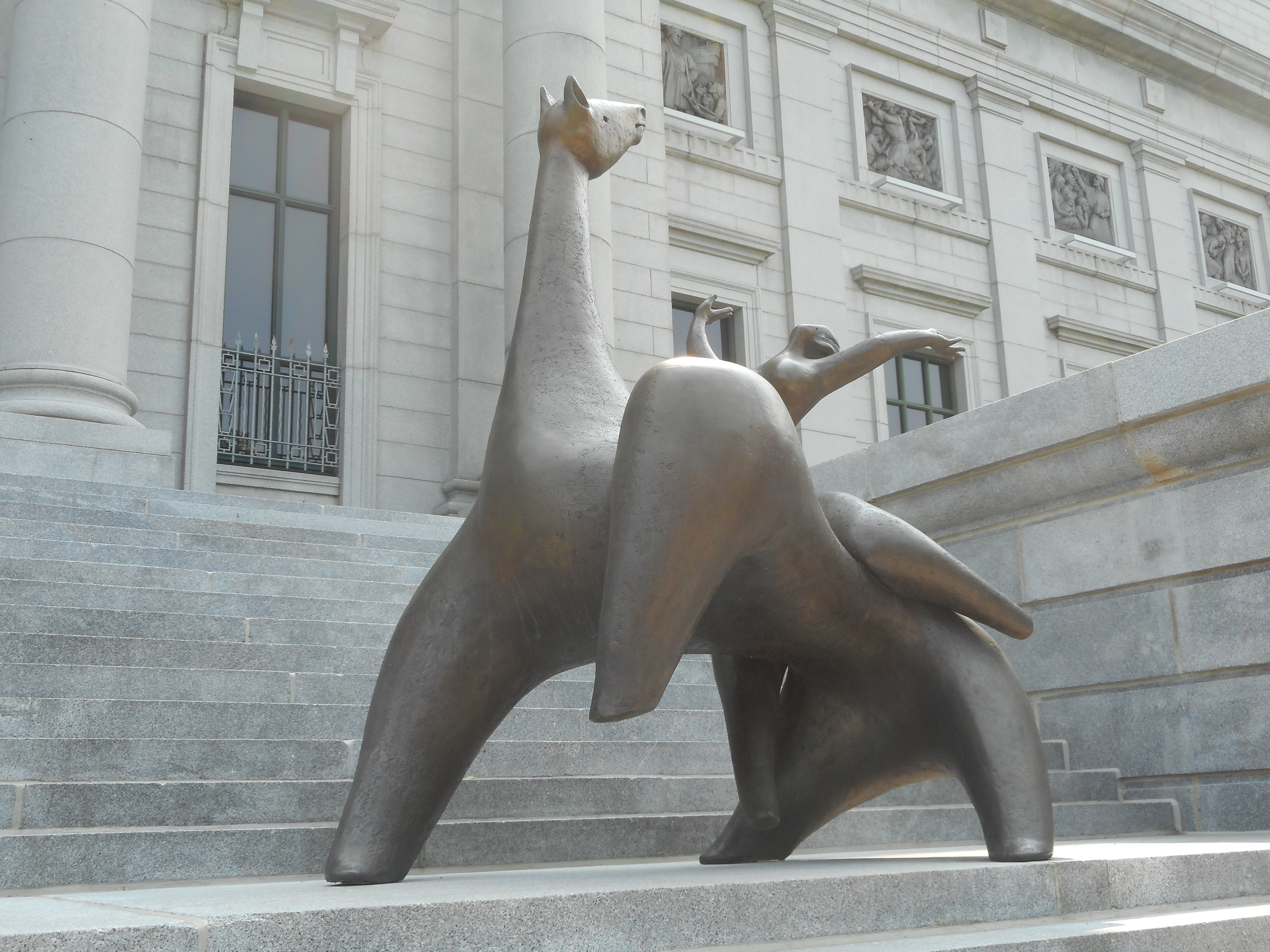
Charles Daudelin, La Cavalière, 1963

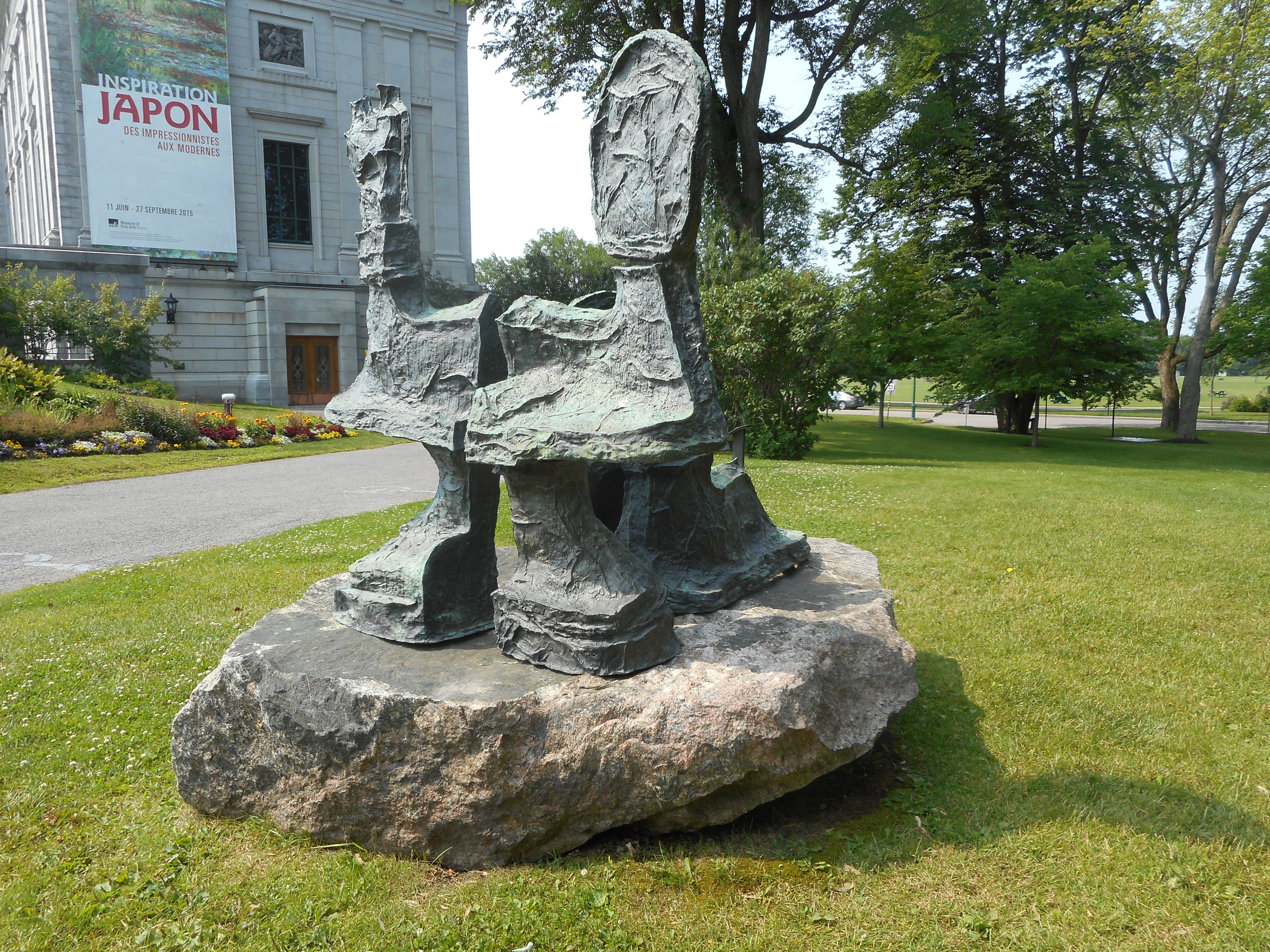
Jean-Paul Riopelle, La Victoire et le Sphinx, 1963–1965

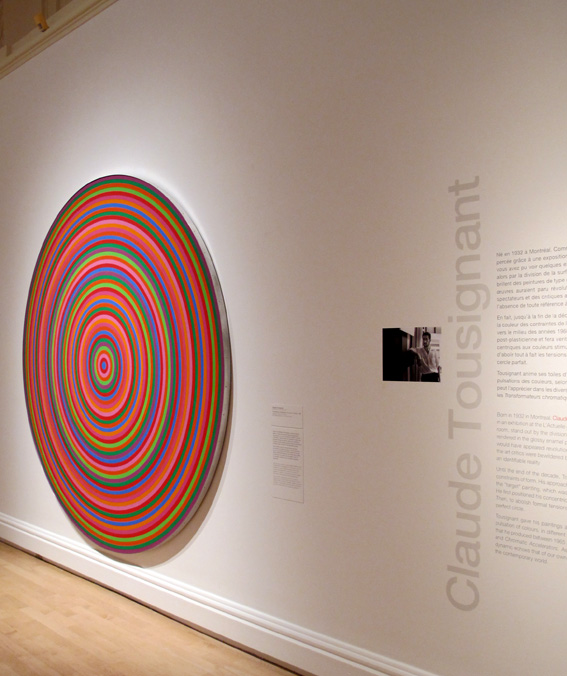
Claude Tousignant, Accélérateur chromatique 1967, de l'album, 1971

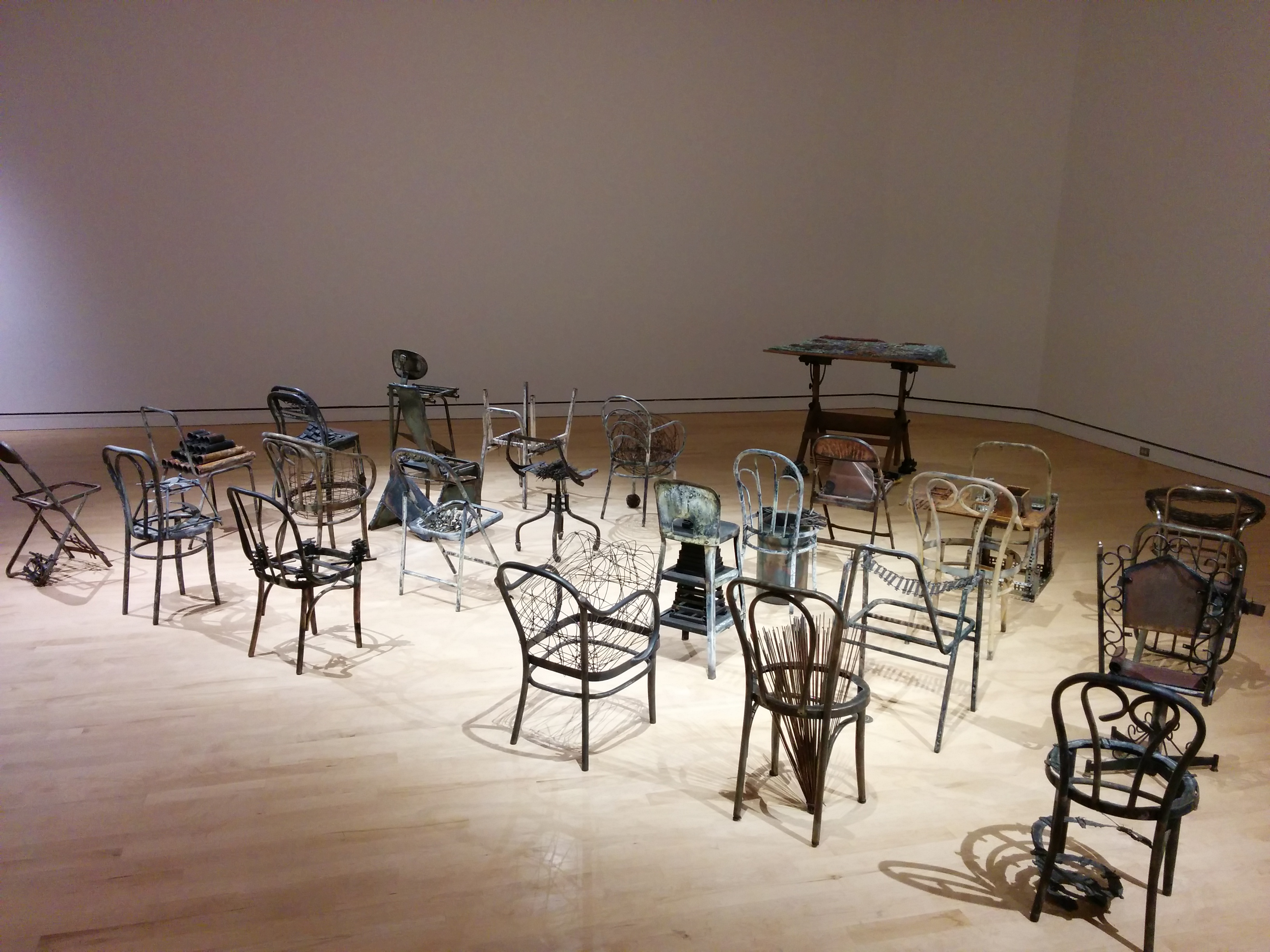
Michel Goulet, Assemblée, 1987

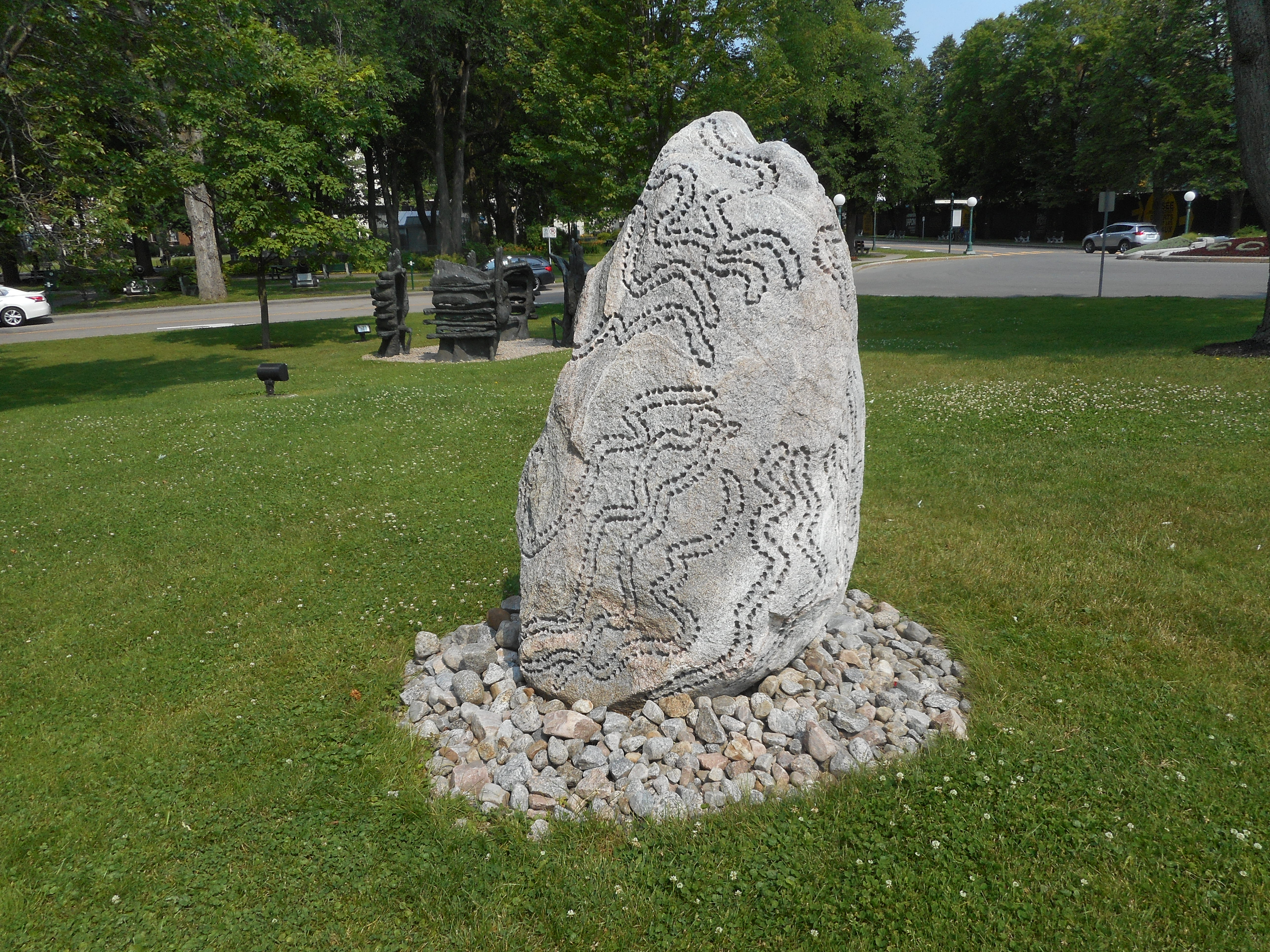
Bill Vazan, Event Horizon, 1989–1991

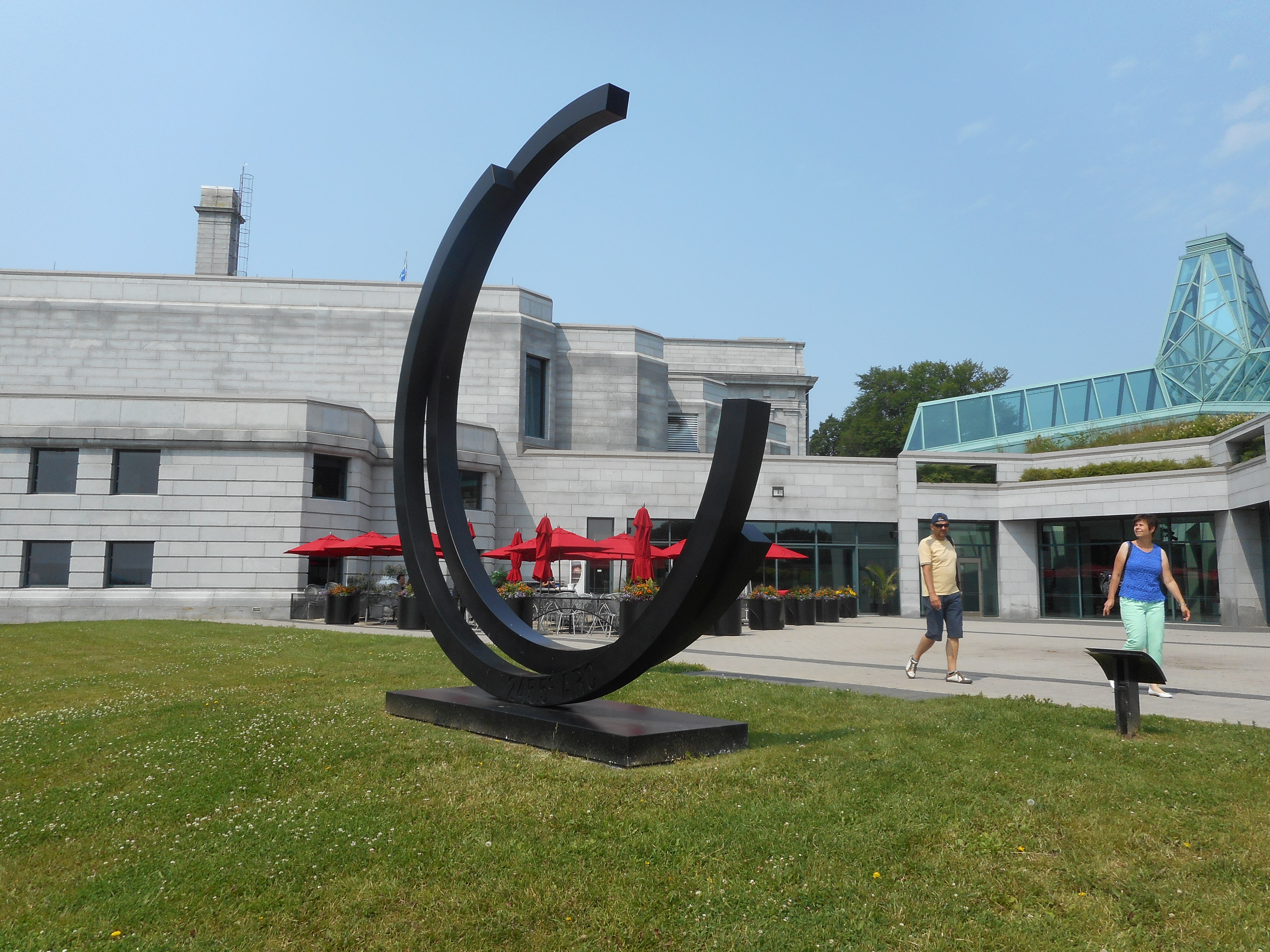
Bernar Venet, Deux Arcs de 245,5°, 1997

== Library and archives ==
The museum also operates a library and archives that specializes in Quebec art. The library contains over 13,000 biographical files, in addition to catalogs, monographs, and audiovisual documents relating to art in Canada, and around the world. Access to the museums library and archives requires a scheduled appointment made with the museum. Fonds that have been computerized may be accessed from CUBIQ, the central catalogue for publicly operated libraries in Quebec.

== See also ==
- List of art museums
- List of museums in Quebec
- List of national galleries
