= Dorothy K. Burnham =

Canadian textile scholar, author and museum curator (1911–2004)

- Born: Dorothy Kate Burnham; November 6, 1911; Toronto, Canada
- Died: October 24, 2004 (aged 92)
- Occupations: Textile scholar; author; curator

Dorothy Kate Burnham CM LL. D. (November 6, 1911 – October 24, 2004) was a Canadian textile scholar, author, and museum curator.

== Early career ==
Burnham was born on November 6, 1911, in Toronto. She began her career at the Royal Ontario Museum (ROM) in Toronto, Canada, in 1929, at the age of 17, as a second assistant draftsman. In 1939, she became the museum's first curator of textiles, taking responsibility for a growing international collection begun by founding director Charles Trick Currelly. She took courses at the Cranbrook Academy of Art and the Banff School of Fine Arts and studied museum practices in Europe. In 1944, she married Harold B. Burnham and over the next sixty years, either independently or in conjunction with Harold, carried out research on Canadian and global textiles and costume. Inspired by a donation of a Canadian coverlet, the couple in 1947 launched a research project on the history of Canadian handweaving, traveling to interview weavers and study looms and collections, first throughout Ontario, and then in all the eastern provinces, leading to the 1971 exhibition and publication Keep Me Warm One Night: Early Handweaving in Eastern Canada (1972). From 1949 to 1973, Burnham took leave from the museum to raise her family and to operate, with Harold, a private weaving enterprise called Burnham&Burnham, located in the Niagara Peninsula.

== Later career ==
In 1973, Burnham rejoined ROM to curate a string of exhibitions and publications, notably Cut My Cote (1973), which revealed basic garment constructions shared the world over, and the influence of weave on costume cut. Following her retirement from the ROM in 1977, she published Warp & Weft: A Dictionary of Textile Terms (1981) a work which advanced the standardization of terminology in the emerging discipline of textile studies. She undertook further research and exhibition projects with the National Gallery of Canada, the Provincial Museum of Alberta and the Canadian Museum of Civilization. These include studies of the painted caribou-skin coats of the Montagnais-Naskapi tribe of the Quebec-Labrador area and of the textile traditions of the Doukhobors.

== Legacy ==
In 1984, Burnham was made a Member of the Order of Canada and in 1990 she was named an Honorary Doctor of Laws, Trent University, Peterborough, Ontario. Burnham’s work at the ROM and throughout her career has made her a seminal figure in Canadian and international textile studies, informing generations of subsequent scholarship.

== Selected works ==
- To please the caribou: painted caribou-skin coats worn by the Naskapi, Montagnais, and Cree hunters of the Quebec-Labrador Peninsula (1992)
- Unlike the lilies: Doukhobor textile traditions in Canada (1986)
- Warp & weft: a dictionary of textile terms (1981)
- The comfortable arts: traditional spinning and weaving in Canada (1981)
- L'art des étoffe: le filage et le tissage traditionnels au Canada (1981)
- Pieced quilts of Ontario (1975)
- Cut my cote (1973)
- Coptic knitting: an ancient technique (1972)
- Keep me warm one night: early handweaving in Eastern Canada (1972)
- Costumes for Canada's birthday: the styles of 1867 (1966)
- Fibres, spindles and spinning wheels (1950)
