= Charles Alexander Smith =

Canadian painter

"L'Assemblée des six-comtés", a painting of the Lower Canada (Quebec) Assembly of the Six Counties made in 1890 by Charles Alexander Smith.

Charles Alexander Smith (1864–1915) was a Canadian painter from Ontario. He was professionally known as Charles Alexander.

== See also ==
- Assemblée des six-comtés (painting)
- List of Canadian painters
- List of Canadian artists
