= Viger =

Viger may refer to:

== People ==
- André Viger (1952–2006), wheelchair marathoner and Paralympic
- Denis Viger (1741–1805), merchant and politician
- Denis-Benjamin Viger (1774–1861), one of the Joint Premiers of the Province of Canada, son of Denis
- Jacques Viger (Member of the Assembly) (1735–1798), member of the Legislative Assembly of Lower Canada
- Jacques Viger (mayor) (1787–1858), first mayor of Montreal
- Joseph Viger (1739–1803), businessman and political figure in Lower Canada
- Louis-Michel Viger (1785–1855), lawyer, politician and businessman
- Viger (Surrey cricketer), English professional cricketer

== Places ==
- Viger, Hautes-Pyrénées, a commune of the Hautes-Pyrénées département, in southwestern France
- Viger (electoral district), a former Quebec provincial electoral district
- Place Viger, both a grand hotel and railway station in Montreal
- Viger Square, a public square in Montreal
