= List of Canadian political families =

During its history, a number of Canadian families have produced multiple politicians. As there are no term limits in Canada for any legislative or executive office, these families have sometimes held uninterrupted political power.

== Allard–Joly ==
(stepmother, stepdaughter)

- Carole-Marie Allard, Liberal MP for Laval East
  - Mélanie Joly, Liberal MP for Ahuntsic-Cartierville and cabinet minister

== Amery ==
(father, son)

- Moe Amery, Alberta PC MLA for Calgary-East
  - Mickey Amery, UCP MLA for Calgary-Cross

== Ashton ==
(father, daughter)

- Steve Ashton, Manitoba NDP cabinet minister for Thompson
  - Niki Ashton, NDP MP for Churchill—Keewatinook Aski

== Bédard ==
- Marc-André Bédard, Vice-Premier of Quebec and Quebec Minister of Justice
  - Stéphane Bédard, leader of the opposition in the National Assembly of Quebec and interim leader of the Parti Québécois
  - Éric Bédard, adjunct-director for the cabinet of Quebec Premier Jacques Parizeau and counsellor for the Parti Québécois led by Pauline Marois (not to be confused with Éric Bédard (historian))

== Bennett ==
(3rd cousins once removed, son)

- R. B. Bennett, eleventh prime minister of Canada
- W. A. C. Bennett, Premier of British Columbia, 1952–1972
  - William R. Bennett, Premier of British Columbia, 1975–1986
    - Brad Bennett, Chair of BC Hydro 2015–present

== Bernier ==
(father, son)

- Gilles Bernier, Quebec Progressive Conservative then Independent MP
  - Maxime Bernier, Quebec Conservative MP and cabinet minister then People's Party of Canada founder and leader

== Blaikie ==
(father, daughter, son)

- Bill Blaikie, Manitoba NDP MP, MLA, and provincial cabinet minister
  - Rebecca Blaikie, President of the federal NDP
  - Daniel Blaikie, Manitoba NDP MP

== Braden ==
(brothers)

- George Braden, 2nd Premier of the Northwest Territories
- Bill Braden, MLA, Northwest Territories

== Bradford ==
(mother, son)

- Valerie Bradford, Liberal MP for Kitchener South—Hespeler
  - Brad Bradford, Toronto city councillor and mayoral candidate in 2023

== Brewin ==
(father, son, daughter-in-law)

- Andrew Brewin, NDP MP for Greenwood (1962–1979)
- John Brewin, NDP MP for Victoria (1988–1993)
- Gretchen Brewin, Mayor of Victoria, BC NDP MLA for Victoria-Beacon Hill (1991–2001), and Speaker of the BC legislature

Andrew Brewin's grandfather Andrew George Blair was also Liberal Premier of New Brunswick and a federal MP and cabinet minister

== Cadman ==
(husband, wife)

- Chuck Cadman, Reform, Canadian Alliance, and Independent MP for Surrey North (1997–2005)
- Dona Cadman, Conservative MP for Surrey North (2008–2011)

== Cannon–Power ==
(GGG-grandfather, G-grandfather, granduncles, grandfathers, uncles, son)

- John Cannon, member of the Legislative Assembly of Lower Canada
  - William Power, member of the House of Commons
    - Joseph Ignatius Power, member of the Quebec Legislative Assembly
    - William Gerard Power, member of the Quebec Legislative Council
    - Lawrence Arthur Dumoulin Cannon, member of the Legislative Assembly of Quebec and Supreme Court Justice
      - Charles Gavan Power, federal cabinet minister (Minister of Pensions and National Health, Postmaster General), Senator for Quebec (1955–1968), MP for Quebec South (1917–1955)
      - Lucien Cannon, federal cabinet minister (Solicitor General), Liberal MLA for Dorchester (1913–1917), MP for Dorchester (1917–1930) and Portneuf (1935–1936).
        - Francis Gavan Power, Liberal MP for Quebec South (1955–1958)
        - Charles-Arthur Dumoulin Cannon, Liberal MP for Îles-de-la-Madeleine (1949–1958)
          - Lawrence Cannon, provincial cabinet minister (Parliamentary Secretaries to the Ministers of Foreign Trade and Technological Development, Tourism; Minister for Communications) and federal cabinet minister (Foreign Minister, Minister of Transport), Liberal MNA for La Peltrie (1985–1994), Conservative MP for Pontiac (2006–2011)
            - Philippe Cannon, chief of staff in two ministries of Quebec

== Caouette ==
(father, son)

- Réal Caouette, MP for Pontiac (1946–1949), MP for Villeneuve (1962–1968,) Leader of the Ralliement créditiste (1963–1971), MP for Témiscamingue (1968–1976), Leader of the Social Credit Party (1971–1976)
  - Gilles Caouette, MP for Charlevoix (1972–1974), MP for Témiscamingue (1976–1979), Acting Leader of the Social Credit Party (1976)

== Caplan ==
(mother, son)

- Elinor Caplan, Liberal MPP and provincial cabinet (Health, Management Board), Liberal MP and federal cabinet minister (as Minister of Citizenship and Immigration, National Revenue)
  - David Caplan, Liberal MPP and provincial minister (Health, Infrastructure)

== Carr (Manitoba) ==
(father, son)

- Jim Carr, Manitoba MLA, Liberal MP for Winnipeg South Centre and federal minister
- Ben Carr (politician), Liberal MP for Winnipeg South Centre

== Carr (New Brunswick) ==
(two twin brothers and their older brother)

- Jack Carr, MLA, New Brunswick
- Jody Carr, MLA, New Brunswick
- Jeff Carr, MLA, New Brunswick

== Casgrain-Beaubien ==
- Charles-Eusèbe Casgrain Sr, MLA Lower Canada
  - Philippe Baby Casgrain MNA, son of Charles-Eusèbe
  - Charles Eusèbe Casgrain, Senator for Ontario, son of Charles-Eusèbe
    - Thomas Chase Casgrain MNA, MP, son of Charles Eusèbe
  - Léon Casgrain (1892–1967), Quebec MLA, great-grandson of Charles-Eusèbe
- Pierre Beaubien, MLA Canada East, president of SSJBM, municipal politician in Montreal
- Joseph-Octave Beaubien (nephew), MLA Canada East, MP
  - Louis Beaubien, MNA, president of SSJBM, co-founder of Outremont
    - Charles-Philippe Beaubien (son of Louis), senator
      - Louis-Philippe Beaubien (grandson of Louis), senator

(many more, see fr:Famille Casgrain)

== Chiarelli ==
(cousins)

- Bob Chiarelli, mayor of Ottawa, Regional Chair of Ottawa-Carleton, provincial MPP and cabinet minister (Ministers of Energy, Municipal Affairs and Housing, Transportation, Energy and Infrastructure)
- Rick Chiarelli, city councillor in Ottawa
- John Chiarelli, former Catholic school board trustee in Ottawa
- Peter Chiarelli, ice hockey executive, nephew of Bob

== Chan–Yip ==
(husband, wife)

- Arnold Chan, Liberal MP for Scarborough—Agincourt
- Jean Yip, Liberal MP for Scarborough—Agincourt (widow's succession beginning in a by-election upon Chan's death)

== Chartrand ==
- Michel Chartrand, president of CSN union federation, founder of Parti Socialiste du Québec
- Simonne Monet-Chartrand (wife of Michel), founder of Fédération des femmes du Québec

== Chrétien–Desmarais ==
(father-nephew-daughter)

- Jean Chrétien, prime minister
  - Raymond Chrétien, Ambassador to the USA
  - France Chrétien Desmarais, husband advisor to Hong Kong Special Administrative Region (China) international advisors council

== Clark ==
(husband-wife-their daughter)

- Joe Clark, 16th Prime Minister of Canada (1979–1980)
- Maureen McTeer, 1988 Progressive Conservative candidate in Carleton—Gloucester, and legal scholar and ethicist
  - Catherine Clark, Cable Public Affairs Channel presenter and marketing consultant

== Clement ==
(stepfather-stepson)

- John Clement, Ontario cabinet minister
  - Tony Clement, Ontario cabinet minister, federal cabinet minister

== Copps ==
(father-daughter)

- Victor K. Copps, mayor of Hamilton, Ontario
  - Sheila Copps, federal cabinet minister

== Crosbie ==
(grandfather, father, son)

- Sir John Chalker Crosbie, cabinet minister in pre-Confederation Newfoundland
  - Chesley Crosbie, politician and anti-Confederation campaigner
    - John Crosbie, federal cabinet minister
      - Ches Crosbie, MHA, Leader of the Newfoundland and Labrador Progressive Conservative Party and Leader of the Opposition

Beth Crosbie, daughter of John and sister of Ches, was a PC candidate for the Newfoundland and Labrador House of Assembly and was President of the Canadian Real Estate Association.

== Cuzetto–Gualtieri ==
(siblings)

- Rudy Cuzzetto, MPP for Mississauga—Lakeshore
- Silvia Gualtieri, MPP for Mississauga East—Cooksville

Silvia Gualtieri is also the mother-in-law of Patrick Brown via his marriage to her daughter, Genevieve Gualtieri.

== David ==
(great-grandfather, grandfather, father, sisters)

- Laurent-Olivier David, MNA Montréal-Est, senator Mille-Isles, founder of newspapers, journalist, historian
  - Athanase David, federal cabinet minister, senator
    - Paul David, senator
      - Françoise David, co-speaker of Québec Solidaire, MNA for Gouin
      - Hélène David, Quebec minister of Culture and communications, Liberal MNA for Outremont

== Davie-Fulton ==
(2 brothers, son-in-law, grandson)

- Theodore Davie, Premier of British Columbia, 1878–1879
- Alexander Edmund Batson Davie, Premier of British Columbia 1892–1895 (brother of Theodore Davie)
  - Frederick John Fulton, Unionist Member of Parliament for Cariboo, 1917 (father of Davie Fulton)
    - Davie Fulton, Member of Parliament Progressive Conservative and British Columbia Conservative Leader (grandson of Premier Davie)

== De Lorimier ==
- Claude-Nicolas-Guillaume de Lorimier Jr, MLA Lower Canada
- François-Marie-Thomas Chevalier de Lorimier (grandson of brother), notary, Parti patriote activist, captain of patriot army, executed at Pied-du-Courant Prison

== De Lotbinière ==
- Louis-Théandre Chartier de Lotbinière Lieutenant-General for Civil and Criminal Affairs, Attorney-General of New France
  - René-Louis Chartier de Lotbinière Chief Councillor of the Sovereign Council of New France, Deputy Attorney-General of New France
    - Eustache Chartier de Lotbinière Councillor of the Sovereign Council of New France (1710–1749), Keeper of the Seals of New France (1717–1726)
      - Michel-Eustache-Gaspard-Alain Chartier de Lotbinière (grandson of Eustache), MLA Lower Canada (Speaker in 1794–1797)
        - Antoine Chartier de Lotbinière Harwood (grandson of Michel), MLA Canada-East, MNA
        - Henri-Gustave Joly de Lotbinière (grandson of Michel), MLA Canada-East, MNA, Premier of Quebec (1878–1879), MP, federal minister
        - Henry Stanislas Harwood (grandson of Michel), Mayor of Vaudreuil, Liberal Party of Canada MP
        - Robert Harwood (politician) (grandson of Michel), Liberal-Conservative Party MP

== Dewar ==
(mother-son)

- Marion Dewar, mayor of Ottawa (1978–85) and NDP MP for Hamilton Mountain (1987–88)
  - Paul Dewar, NDP MP for Ottawa Centre (2006–15)

== Dinn ==
(brothers)

- Jim Dinn, Newfoundland and Labrador NDP Member of the House of Assembly
- Paul Dinn, Newfoundland and Labrador PC Member of the House of Assembly

The brothers served together in the legislature for the competing parties.

== Dorion ==
- Pierre-Antoine Dorion, MLA Lower Canada
  - Jean-Baptiste-Éric Dorion, MLA Canada East, co-founder of Institut canadien de Montréal
  - Antoine-Aimé Dorion, MLA Canada East, Premier Canada East 1858–1858 & 1863–1864
  - Vincislas-Paul-Wilfrid Dorion, lawyer, journalist, politician, judge

== Douglas ==
(father, daughter)

- Tommy Douglas, Co-operative Commonwealth Federation (CCF) and then founder of the New Democratic Party (NDP), member of Canadian House of Commons (CCF), MLA, leader of the Saskatchewan CCF and Premier of Saskatchewan (CCF), set up North America's first single-payer, universal healthcare program (Saskatchewan), leader of federal NDP, Canadian Member of Parliament (NDP)
  - Shirley Douglas (daughter of Tommy Douglas), Canadian actress and activist, ex-wife of actor Donald Sutherland, mother of Thomas Emil Sicks, actor Kiefer Sutherland, and film and television producer Rachel Sutherland

== Duceppe ==
(grandfather, father, son)

- Jean Duceppe, actor, radio personality, president of Union des artistes
  - Gilles Duceppe, first MP elected as Bloc Québécois, leader of Bloc Québécois, 24th federal Leader of Opposition
    - Alexis Brunelle-Duceppe, Bloc Québécois MP for Lac-Saint-Jean

== Eyking ==
(husband, wife)

- Mark Eyking, Liberal MP
- Pam Eyking, Liberal MLA

== Fanjoy ==
(uncle, nephew)

- Harold Fanjoy, Progressive Conservative MLA for Kings Centre (1974–1987)
  - Bruce Fanjoy, Liberal MP for Carleton

== Ferron ==
- J.-Émile Ferron, MP (PLC), lawyer
  - Jacques Ferron (son of J.-Émile), founder of the Rhinoceros Party of Canada (1963–93), physician, writer
  - Madeleine Ferron (daughter of J.-Émile), wife of politician/judge Robert Cliche

== Flaherty-Elliott ==
(husband, wife)

- Jim Flaherty, late provincial and federal cabinet minister
- Christine Elliott, PC MPP

== Ford ==
- Doug Ford, Sr., former PC MPP (1995–1999)
  - Rob Ford, 64th Mayor of Toronto, Toronto City Councillor; son of Doug
  - Doug Ford, Jr., 26th Premier of Ontario, Toronto City Councillor; son of Doug
    - Michael Ford, Toronto City Councillor; nephew of Rob and Doug Jr

Additionally, Rob Ford's widow Renata Ford was People's Party candidate in the 2019 federal election in Etobicoke North, and Doug Ford, Jr.'s daughter Krista Haynes advocates controversial positions about vaccines and public health measures.

== Fry ==
(mother, son)

- Hedy Fry, Liberal MP for Vancouver Centre (1993–)
  - Pete Fry, Green Vancouver City Councillor (2018–)

== Gérin-Lajoie ==
- Antoine Gérin-Lajoie, writer, lawyer, author of the political song "Un Canadien errant"
  - Marie Lacoste-Gérin-Lajoie, promoter of women's rights, got Quebec's Code Civil modified
    - Marie Gérin-Lajoie (daughter of Marie L & Henri/Henry), founder of Notre-Dame-du-Bon-Conseil institute and of FNSJB (feminist organisation)
      - Paul Gérin-Lajoie, MNA, founder of the Ministry of Education of Quebec; see also Gérin-Lajoie doctrine (international policy)

== Gerretsen ==
(father, son)

- John Gerretsen, 90th Mayor of Kingston, Ontario (1980–1988), Ontario Liberal MPP for Kingston and the Islands (1995–2014)
- Mark Gerretsen, Mayor of Kingston Ontario (2010–2014), Liberal MP for Kingston and the Islands (2015–)

== Ghiz ==
(father, son)

- Joe Ghiz, Premier of Prince Edward Island (1986–1993)
  - Robert Ghiz, Premier of Prince Edward Island (2007–2015)

== Grewal ==
(husband, wife)

- Gurmant Grewal and Nina Grewal, Conservative Members of Parliament, the first married couple to serve as MPs in the same session of Parliament

== Hampton–Martel ==
(husband-wife, wife's father and maternal grandfather)

- Norman Fawcett, New Democrat MP
  - Elie Martel, Ontario New Democrat MPP (married Fawcett's daughter)
    - Shelley Martel, Ontario New Democrat MPP
      - Howard Hampton, Ontario New Democrat leader, 1996–2009

== Harris ==
(father, son)

- Mike Harris, Progressive Conservative premier of Ontario (1995–2002)
  - Mike Harris Jr., Ontario Progressive Conservative MPP for Kitchener—Conestoga

== Henderson ==
(father, son)

- George Henderson, federal MP (1980–1988)
  - Robert Henderson, PEI provincial MLA (2007–present)

== Hinman ==
(grandfather, grandson)

- Edgar Hinman, Provincial Treasurer, Alberta
  - Paul Hinman, leader of the Alberta Alliance Party

== Horner ==
- Ralph Horner, patriarch for the Horner family, Senator (1933–1964)
- Samuel Norval Horner, brother, Saskatchewan MLA (1929–1934)
  - Jack Horner, son, MP (1958–1959)
    - Nate Horner, grandson, MLA (2019–present)
  - Hugh Horner, son, MP (1958–1967)
  - Norval Horner, son, MP (1972–1974)
    - Norval Horner, son to Norval Horner, Alberta Liberal Party candidate in the 2012 election
  - Albert Horner, nephew, MP (1958–1968)
    - Doug Horner, son of Alberta Horner, Alberta MLA and Cabinet Minister (2001–2015)
      - Byron Horner, grandson, Conservative candidate for Courtenay-Alberni in the 2019 federal election

== Ignatieff ==
(great-grandfather, grandfather, father, son)

- Count Nikolai Pavlovich Ignatiev, Minister of the Interior (Russia)
  - Count Paul Ignatieff, Minister of Education (Russia)
    - George Ignatieff, ambassador/president of UN security council (1968–1969)
      - Michael Ignatieff, federal Member of Parliament and leader of the Liberal Party of Canada (2008–2011)

== Jackman ==
(grandfather, son-in-law, son-in-law's children)

- Newton Rowell, Ontario Liberal Party leader
  - Harry Jackman, Member of Parliament (married Rowell's daughter)
    - Hal Jackman, Lieutenant Governor of Ontario
    - Nancy Ruth, Senator

== Johnson ==
(father-sons)

- Daniel Johnson, Sr., Union Nationale Premier of Quebec 1966–1968
  - Pierre-Marc Johnson, Parti Québécois Premier of Quebec, 1985; son of Daniel, Sr.
  - Daniel Johnson, Jr., Liberal Party of Quebec Premier of Quebec, 1994; son of Daniel, Sr.; brother of Pierre-Marc

== Kelley ==
(father-son, wife)

- Geoffrey Kelley, Quebec Liberal Party MNA for Jacques-Cartier 1994–2018
  - Greg Kelley, Quebec Liberal Party MNA for Jacques-Cartier 2018–present; son of Geoffrey
  - Marwah Rizqy, Quebec Liberal Party MNA for Saint-Laurent 2018–present; wife of Greg, daughter-in-law of Geoffrey

== Lacoste ==
- Alexandre Lacoste, president of senate
  - Marie Lacoste-Gérin-Lajoie (daughter of Alexandre) (see Gérin-Lajoie)
  - Justine Lacoste-Beaubien (daughter of Alexandre), co-founder & director of Hôpital Sainte-Justine

== Lamoureux ==
(father, daughter)

- Kevin Lamoureux, federal Liberal Member of Parliament for Winnipeg North
  - Cindy Lamoureux, Manitoba Liberal MLA

(Darrin Lamoureux, Kevin's brother, was leader of the Saskatchewan Liberal Party at a time that party was a minor party unrepresented in the legislature.)

== Layton ==
- Gilbert Layton, Member of the National Assembly of Quebec and cabinet minister
  - Robert Layton, federal Member of Parliament and cabinet minister
    - Jack Layton, Toronto City Councillor and leader of the federal New Democratic Party
      - Olivia Chow, Mayor of Toronto, and Toronto City Councillor and Member of Parliament
      - Mike Layton, Toronto City Councillor (son of Jack, stepson of Olivia)

Jack Layton is also a descendant of William Steeves, a Father of Confederation and Senator, on his maternal side.

== LeBlanc ==
(father, son)

- Roméo LeBlanc, federal cabinet minister, Speaker of the Senate, 25th Governor General of Canada
  - Dominic LeBlanc, federal cabinet minister

== Léger ==
(father, son, daughter)

- Marcel Léger, co-founder of Léger Marketing, Member of the National Assembly of Quebec, PQ cabinet minister, founder of Parti nationaliste du Québec
  - Jean-Marc Léger, co-founder and current leader of Léger Marketing (one of the two main pollsters of Quebec politics)
  - Nicole Léger, Member of the National Assembly of Quebec, PQ cabinet minister

== Lewis ==
(grandfather-father-son)

- David Lewis, leader of the New Democratic Party of Canada
  - Stephen Lewis, leader of the Ontario New Democratic Party, Canadian Ambassador to the United Nations
    - Avi Lewis, filmmaker and leader of the New Democratic Party of Canada

== Lougheed ==
(grandfather and grandson)

- Sir James Lougheed, Senator
  - Peter Lougheed, Premier of Alberta

== MacKay ==
(father-son)

- Elmer MacKay, Progressive Conservative MP and cabinet minister
  - Peter MacKay, Progressive Conservative and then Conservative MP and former Progressive Conservative leader

== Mancini ==
(husband-wife)

- Peter Mancini, Nova Scotia NDP MP
- Marian Mancini, Nova Scotia NDP MLA

== Manly ==
(father-son)

- James Manly, BC NDP MP
  - Paul Manly, BC Green Party MP

== Manning ==
(father-son)

- Ernest Manning, Premier of Alberta, 1943–1968
  - Preston Manning, founder of the Reform Party, MP

== Martin ==
(father-son)

- Paul Martin Sr., long serving Cabinet minister
  - Paul Martin, 21st prime minister

== Macdonald ==
(father-son)

- John A. Macdonald, first prime minister of Canada
  - Hugh John Macdonald, federal cabinet minister, premier of Manitoba

== Mackenzie King ==
(grandfather-grandson)

- William Lyon Mackenzie, rebel, first mayor of Toronto
  - William Lyon Mackenzie King, Canada's longest serving prime minister

== Marcelino ==
(sister-in-law, brother-in-law, sister-in-law's daughter)

- Flor Marcelino, former Manitoba NDP MLA, cabinet minister, and interim party and opposition leader
  - Ted Marcelino, former Manitoba NDP MLA
  - Malaya Marcelino, Manitoba NDP MLA

== Mathyssen ==
(mother, daughter)

- Irene Mathyssen, former NDP MP for London—Fanshawe
  - Lindsay Mathyssen, NDP MP for London—Fanshawe

== McGuinty ==
(father-son)

- Dalton McGuinty, Sr., MPP from Ottawa South
  - Dalton McGuinty, MPP from Ottawa South, and Premier of Ontario
  - David McGuinty, MP from Ottawa South and federal cabinet minister

== McLeod ==
(brothers)

- Bob McLeod, Premier of the Northwest Territories
- Michael McLeod, MLA in the Northwest Territories and Liberal MP for Northwest Territories

== Meighen ==
(father, son, daughter, grandson, grandson's stepfather)

- Arthur Meighen, ninth prime minister of Canada
  - Lillian Meighen, philanthropist
  - Theodore Meighen, lawyer and philanthropist
    - Michael Meighen, Senator
      - Hartland Molson, Senator, married Theodore Meighen's widow

== Mercier-Gouin ==
- Honoré Mercier, Premier of Quebec (1887–1891)
  - Honoré Mercier Jr. (son of Honoré & brother-in-law of Lomer Gouin), MNA
    - Honoré Mercier III, MNA
- Lomer Gouin, Premier of Quebec (1905–1920)
  - Paul Gouin (son of Lomer & Éliza, grandson of Honoré), MNA, founder of Action Libérale Nationale party, co-founder of Bloc populaire party
  - Léon Mercier Gouin (son of Lomer & Éliza, grandson of Honoré), co-founder of HEC Montréal university, political writer
    - Ollivier Mercier Gouin (son of Léon-Mercier), writer, reporter, actor
- Louis Gouin (?), MLA Lower Canada
  - Thomas Mulcair, great-great-grandson of Honoré Sr. and great-great-great-grandson of Pierre-Joseph-Olivier Chauveau, Federal Leader of Opposition for NPD, cabinet minister in Quebec

== Miville-Dechêne ==
- François-Gilbert Miville Dechêne, MLA, cabinet minister in Québec
- Alphonse-Arthur Miville Déchêne, MP, senator, brother of François-Gilbert
- Aimé-Miville Déchêne, MP, son of Alphonse-Arthur
- Louis-Auguste Dupuis, MLA Québec, president of notaries, nephew of François-Gilbert & Alphonse-Arthur
- Pamphile-Gaspard Verreault, MLA Québec, other uncle of Louis-Auguste
- Jean-Baptiste Couillard Dupuis, MLA Québec, father-in-law of Pamphile-Gaspard
- Joseph Miville Dechene, MP, MLA Alberta, city councillor

== Mulroney ==
(father, daughter, son)

- Brian Mulroney, 18th prime minister of Canada (1984–1993)
  - Caroline Mulroney, former Ontario provincial Cabinet minister; daughter of Brian Mulroney
  - Ben Mulroney, Canadian television host; son of Brian Mulroney
  - Jessica Mulroney, Canadian fashion stylist and marketing consultant; ex-wife of Ben Mulroney, daughter-in-law of Brian Mulroney

== Nickle ==
(father, son)

- William Folger Nickle, MP for Kingston and namesake of the Nickle Resolution
  - William McAdam Nickle, MPP for Kingston

== Nixon (Alberta) ==
(brother, brother)

- Jason Nixon, Alberta United Conservative Party MLA
- Jeremy Nixon, Alberta United Conservative Party MLA

== Nixon (Ontario) ==
(grandfather, father, daughter)

- Harry Nixon, Ontario premier
  - Robert Nixon, Ontario Liberal Party leader
    - Jane Stewart, Liberal MP, cabinet minister, chief of staff

== Notley ==
(father, daughter)

- Grant Notley, Alberta MLA, Leader of the Alberta New Democratic Party
  - Rachel Notley, Premier of Alberta

== Nowlan ==
(father, son)

- George Nowlan, federal minister of finance
  - Pat Nowlan, MP for Annapolis Valley—Hants

== Osborne ==
(mother, son)

- Sheila Osborne, Newfoundland and Labrador PC MHA
  - Tom Osborne, Newfoundland and Labrador PC MHA and cabinet Minister, then Independent then Liberal MHA

Sheila's son and Tom's brother Bob Osborne was also a candidate for the House of Assembly.

== O'Toole ==
(father, son)

- John O'Toole, Ontario Progressive Conservative MPP for Durham
  - Erin O'Toole, leader of the Conservative Party of Canada and leader of the Official Opposition (2020–2022), and MP for Durham

== Papineau ==
(see also Viger)

- Joseph Papineau, MLA Lower Canada
  - Louis-Joseph Papineau (#1, son of Joseph), leader of the Parti patriote
    - Talbot Mercer Papineau (grandson of Louis-Joseph #1, son of Louis-Joseph #2, cousin of Henri Bourassa)
  - Denis-Benjamin Papineau (son of Joseph), MLA Canada East, Premier of Canada East (1846–1848)
    - Denis-Émery Papineau (son of Denis-Benjamin), MLA Canada East
- Henri Bourassa (son of Mrs Azélie Papineau), MP, MNA, founder of Ligue nationaliste, founder of Le Devoir newspaper
- Louis-Joseph Papineau (#3, son of Narcisse), MP, MNA
- François Bourassa (uncle of Henri, brother-in-law of Azélie), captain of patriote army, MLA Canada-East, MP

== Parizeau ==
- Damase Dalpé dit Parizeau, MNA
  - Télesphore Parizeau, dean of medecine at Université de Montréal
    - Gérard Parizeau, insurer & historian
      - Jacques Parizeau (great-grandson of Damase), Deputy Minister, MNA, Minister of Finance of Quebec, Premier of Quebec (1994–1996)
- Alice Parizeau (Alicja Poznańska) (1st wife of Jacques), writer, journalist, criminologist, Croix de Guerre (WW2 French decoration)
- Lisette Lapointe (or Lizette) (2nd wife of Jacques), MNA, mayor of Saint-Adolphe-d'Howard

== Peterson ==
(brother, brother, brother and wife)

- Jim Peterson, MP for Willowdale and Cabinet Minister
- David Peterson, MPP for London Centre and Premier of Ontario
- Tim Peterson, MPP for Mississauga South
- Deb Matthews, MPP for London North Centre

== Pouliot ==
- Jean-Baptiste Pouliot, MP for Témiscouata, MLA Canada-East for Témiscouata
  - Joseph-Camille Pouliot, son of Jean-Baptiste, lawyer, judge of Superior Court of Quebec
    - Georges Bouchard, son-in-law of Joseph-Camille, MP for Kamouraska
    - Camille Pouliot (Camille-Eugène), son of Joseph-Camille, MNA for Gaspé-Sud, minister, mayor
  - Rodolphe Lemieux, brother of 3rd wife of Joseph-Camille, senator
  - Charles-Eugène Pouliot, son of Jean-Baptiste, MP for Témiscouata, MNA for Témiscouata
    - Jean-François Pouliot, son of Charles-Eugène, MP for Témiscouata

== Rae ==
(father-brother-brother)

- Saul Rae, career diplomat
  - Bob Rae, New Democratic Party of Ontario premier of Ontario, diplomat, candidate in the 2006 Liberal Party of Canada leadership election
  - John Rae, strategic political advisor to Liberal prime ministers

== Regan-Harrison ==
(maternal grandfather-father-son-son's wife)

- John Harrison, Saskatchewan Liberal MP
  - Gerald A. Regan, Liberal Party of Nova Scotia premier of Nova Scotia, federal cabinet minister
    - Geoff Regan, federal Liberal cabinet minister, speaker of the House of Commons.
    - Kelly Regan, provincial MLA

== Rideout ==
- George R. Rideout, Police Chief of Moncton
  - Sherwood Rideout, Mayor of Moncton, MP
  - Margaret Rideout, MP
    - George S. Rideout, MP
    - Bob Rideout, Chair of the Mental Health Commission of New Brunswick

== Roblin ==
(grandfather-grandson)

- Rodmond Roblin, premier of Manitoba
  - Dufferin ("Duff") Roblin, premier of Manitoba, federal senator

== Rowe ==
(father-daughter)

- William Earl Rowe, Ontario Conservative Party leader and Lieutenant Governor of Ontario
  - Jean Casselman Wadds, Member of Parliament and diplomat

== Schulz-Schreyer ==
(grandfather-son-in-law-grandson)

- Jacob Schulz, CCF Member of Parliament for Springfield
  - Ed Schreyer, NDP Premier of Manitoba and Governor General of Canada
    - Jason Schreyer, Winnipeg City Councillor for Elmwood-East Kildonan

== Shaw–McDonough ==
(father-daughter)

- Lloyd R. Shaw, first research director of the federal CCF, and provincial secretary of the Nova Scotia CCF
  - Alexa McDonough, Member of the Legislative Assembly and leader of the Nova Scotia New Democratic Party, and Member of Parliament and leader of the federal NDP (the NDP being the CCF's successor)

== Shulman–Saxe ==
(father-daughter)

- Morton Shulman, Ontario chief coroner and later NDP MPP for High Park
  - Dianne Saxe, Environmental Commissioner of Ontario, Deputy Leader of the Green Party of Ontario, and Toronto city councillor

== Singh ==
(brothers)

- Jagmeet Singh, former Ontario NDP MPP for Bramalea—Gore—Malton, Leader of the New Democratic Party
- Gurratan Singh, Ontario NDP MPP for Brampton East

== Sifton ==
(father-sons)

- John Wright Sifton, MLA, speaker of the house in Manitoba
  - Arthur Sifton, premier of Alberta, federal cabinet minister
  - Clifford Sifton, Manitoba cabinet minister, federal cabinet minister

== Simpson ==
(father, son)

- Rocky Simpson Sr., Northwest Territories MLA for Hay River South
  - R. J. Simpson, Northwest Territories MLA for Hay River North

== Sinclair–Trudeau ==
(grandfather, son-in-law, grandson)

- James Sinclair, federal cabinet minister (Minister of Fisheries) and father of Margaret Trudeau
  - Pierre Trudeau, federal Liberal cabinet minister, 15th prime minister of Canada
    - Justin Trudeau, 23rd prime minister of Canada
    - Alexandre Trudeau, television journalist

== Strahl ==
(father, son)

- Chuck Strahl, Former Conservative MP for Chilliwack—Fraser Canyon
  - Mark Strahl, Conservative MP for Chilliwack—Hope, previously Chilliwack—Fraser Canyon

== Streatch-Keddy ==
(father, daughter, son)

- Ken Streatch, former Conservative MP for Chilliwack—Fraser Canyon
  - Steve Streatch, former Halifax Regional Municipality Councillor
  - Judy Streatch, former Progressive Conservative MLA for Chester-St. Margaret's
    - Gerald Keddy, former Conservative MP for South Shore-St. Margaret's (married to Judy Streatch)

== Stronach ==
(father, daughter)

- Frank Stronach, Austrian-Canadian businessman, founder of Magna International and Team Stronach
  - Belinda Stronach, businesswoman and MP for Newmarket—Aurora from 2004 to 2008, crossing the floor from Conservative to Liberal in 2005

== Taschereau ==
- Gabriel-Elzéar Taschereau, MLA Lower Canada
  - Jean-Thomas Taschereau (1778–1832) Sr, MLA Lower Canada, judge
    - Elzéar-Alexandre Taschereau, first catholic cardinal born in Canada
    - Jean-Thomas Taschereau Jr, Quebec Superior Court
      - Louis-Alexandre Taschereau, Premier of Quebec 1920–1936
        - Robert Taschereau, chief justice of Supreme Court, interim Governor General
  - Thomas-Pierre-Joseph Taschereau, businessman, judge, Legislative Council of Lower Canada
    - Joseph-André Taschereau, lawyer, MLA Lower Canada, MLA Canada-East, judge of Superior Court of Quebec
    - Pierre-Elzéar Taschereau, lawyer, MLA Lower Canada, MLA Canada-East
      - Henri-Elzéar Taschereau, MLA Canada-East, first French-Canadian chief justice of Supreme Court, Judicial Committee of the Privy Council

== Tascona–Brown ==
(uncle, nephew)

- Joe Tascona, MPP for Simcoe Centre and then Barrie—Simcoe—Bradford
- Patrick Brown, MP for Barrie (2006–2015) and MPP for Simcoe North (2015–2018), Ontario Progressive Conservative leader and leader of the Official Opposition (2015–2018), Mayor of Brampton (2018–present)

== Taylor ==
(father-children)

- Tom Taylor, mayor of Newmarket, Ontario (1997–2006)
  - John Taylor, mayor of Newmarket, Ontario (2018–present)
  - Leah Taylor Roy, Liberal MP for Aurora—Oak Ridges—Richmond Hill (2021–2025)

== Tucker ==
(brothers)

- George Tucker (Ontario MPP)
- James Tucker (Ontario MPP)

== Tupper ==
(father-sons)

- Charles Tupper, 6th prime minister of Canada
  - Charles Hibbert Tupper, Minister of Justice
  - William Johnston Tupper, Lieutenant Governor of Manitoba

== Vallières ==
- Yvon Vallières, MNA, President of Assemblée Nationale
- Monique Gagnon-Tremblay, MNA, Vice-Premier, wife of Yvon Vallières
  - Karine Vallières, MNA, daughter

== Viger ==
(see also Papineau)

- Denis Viger, MLA Lower Canada
  - Denis-Benjamin Viger, owner of newspapers, MLA Lower Canada, MLA Canada East, Premier of Canada East (1843–1846)
- Jacques Viger (sr), MLA Lower Canada
  - Jacques Viger (1787–1858) (Jr), 1st mayor of Montreal
- Bonaventure Viger, patriote in Lower Canada Rebellion, cousin of Denis-Benjamin
- Joseph Viger, MLA Lower Canada
- Louis-Michel Viger, MLA Lower Canada, MLA Canada East

== Wagner ==
(father-son)

- Claude Wagner, judge, Quebec Liberal MNA and cabinet minister and Progressive Conservative MP and Senator
  - Richard Wagner, judge, Chief Justice of Canada, Administrator of Canada

== Whelan ==
(brother-father-daughter)

- Edward Charles Whelan, Member of Legislative Assembly (Saskatchewan) 1960–1979, Minister of Mineral Resources 1975–1976, Minister of Consumer Affairs 1976–1979
- Eugene Whelan, Member of Parliament 1962–1984, Minister of Agricultuture 1972–1979 and 1980–1984, Canadian Senate 1996–1999, Officer of the Order of Canada
  - Susan Whelan, Member of Parliament 1993–2004, Minister for International Cooperation

== Whitehead ==
(grandfather-father-daughter)

- Joseph Whitehead, Member of Parliament (Huron North, Ontario) 1867–1871
- Joseph Donovan Ross, Member of Legislative Assembly (Alberta) 1952–1971, Minister of Health 1955–1968, Minister of Lands and Forests 1968–1971
  - Val Meredith, Member of Parliament (South Surrey – White Rock – Langley, British Columbia) 1993–2004

== Woodsworth-MacInnis ==
(father-son in law-daughter)

- J.S. Woodsworth, founding leader of the CCF, MP 1921–1942
  - Angus MacInnis, MP from BC 1930–1957, involved in founding of the CCF, husband of Grace MacInnis
  - Grace MacInnis, BC CCF MLA 1941–45, NDP MP 1965–1974, daughter of J.S. Woodsworth

== Yakabuski ==
(father-son)

- Paul Yakabuski, Reeve of Barry's Bay, Ontario, MPP, Renfrew South, Ontario
  - John Yakabuski MPP, Renfrew—Nipissing—Pembroke, Ontario

== See also ==
- Political families of the world
