= Jacques Viger =

Jacques Viger may refer to:

- Jacques Viger (mayor) (1787–1858), antiquarian, archaeologist and mayor of Montreal, Quebec
- Jacques Viger (Member of the Assembly) (1735–1798), political figure in Lower Canada
