= Howard Blair =

Howard Blair may refer to:

- Red Blair (Howard Holt Blair, 1900–1947), American college football and college basketball player, coach, and athletics administrator
- Howard G. Blair (1949–2023), American politician, mayor of Auburn, Kentucky
