= Howard G. Blair =

American politician and civil servant

Howard Blair

26th Mayor of Auburn, Kentucky
- In office April 24, 1981 – April 14, 1993

Personal details
- Born: September 20, 1949 Auburn, Kentucky, USA
- Died: July 29, 2023 (aged 73)
- Party: Republican

Howard Blair (September 20, 1949 – July 29, 2023) was an American politician, who served as Mayor of Auburn, Kentucky from 1981 to 1993. He was a member of the Republican Party, as was his father George Blair.

Blair and his father are distant relatives of the Brewin family, and have followed in their cousins footsteps, entering into the politics of Kentucky. Howard served in multiple county and city level positions prior to running for mayor of Auburn in 1981, an election which he won by approximately 300 votes. He served as mayor for three consecutive terms, before an unsuccessful campaign for the Kentucky senate seat representing Logan County.
