= Joseph-Ovide Turgeon =

Canadian politician

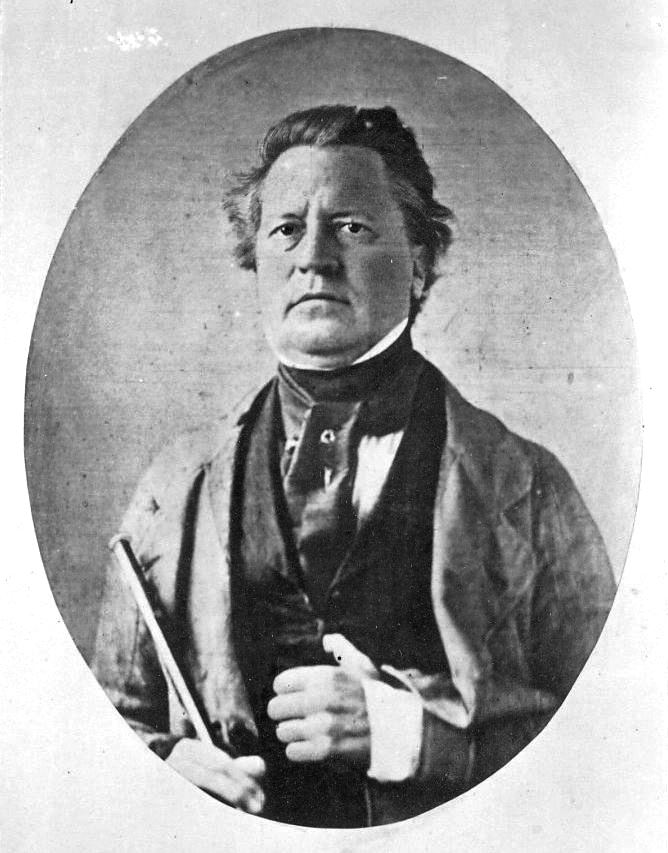
Joseph-Ovide Turgeon

Joseph-Ovide Turgeon (1797 – 9 November 1856) was a Quebec official and political figure.

== Early life and education ==
He was born at Terrebonne in 1797, a cousin of Louis Turgeon, and studied at the Petit Séminaire de Montréal.

== Career ==
He travelled in the United States before settling again at Terrebonne. He was named commissioner in charge of extending the Effingham road to Killkenny in 1830.

Turgeon was elected to the Legislative Assembly of Lower Canada for Effingham in 1824 as a member of the parti canadien and was reelected in 1827.

In 1830, he was elected again, this time in Terrebonne. Turgeon voted in support of the Ninety-Two Resolutions. He was appointed to the Legislative Council of the Province of Canada in 1848 and died at Terrebonne while still in office in 1856.

== Family ==
His daughter later married Charles Laberge, a member of the Legislative Assembly, and his son married the adopted daughter of Amable Berthelot.
