= Louis Turgeon =

Canadian politician

Louis Turgeon (French pronunciation: [lwi tyʁʒɔ̃]; April 10, 1762 – September 26, 1827) was a notary, seigneur and political figure in Lower Canada.

He was born in Beaumont, in the French colony of Canada in 1762, studied at the Petit Séminaire de Québec, articled as a notary and was licensed to practice in 1792. He set up his office at Saint-Charles near Quebec City. He was named a justice of the peace in Quebec district in 1794. In 1804, he was elected to the Legislative Assembly of Lower Canada for Hertford, usually supporting the parti canadien; he was reelected in 1808 and then in 1816. He served in the local militia during the War of 1812, becoming lieutenant-colonel in 1821. In 1818, he resigned his seat when he was appointed to the Legislative Council of Lower Canada. He had inherited part of the seigneury of Beaumont in 1768 when his mother died; by 1819, he had become principal seigneur for Beaumont.

He died in Saint-Charles in 1827.

His daughter Marie-Ermine married Louis-Michel Viger. His cousin Joseph-Ovide Turgeon also served in the legislative assembly.
