= Louis-Michel Viger =

Lower Canada lawyer, banker and politician

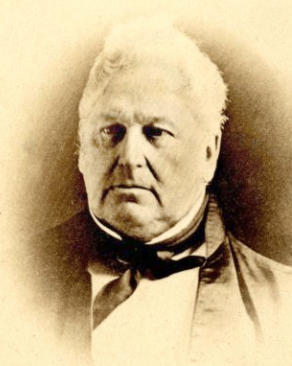
- Louis-Michel Viger, 1850

Member of the Legislative Assembly of Lower Canada for Chambly
- In office 1830 – 1838 (two elections) Serving with Frédéric-Auguste Quesnel (1830–1834); Louis Lacoste (1834–1838)
- Preceded by: Denis-Benjamin Viger
- Succeeded by: None; position abolished on suspension of the constitution

Member of the Legislative Assembly of the Province of Canada for Nicolet
- In office 1842–1844
- Preceded by: Augustin-Norbert Morin
- Succeeded by: Antoine-Prosper Méthot

Receiver General of the Province of Canada
- In office March 11, 1848–November 26, 1849
- Preceded by: François-Pierre Bruneau
- Succeeded by: Étienne-Paschal Taché

Member of the Legislative Assembly of the Province of Canada for Terrebonne
- In office 1848–1851
- Preceded by: Louis-Hippolyte LaFontaine
- Succeeded by: Augustin-Norbert Morin

Member of the Legislative Assembly of the Province of Canada for Leinster
- In office 1851–1854
- Preceded by: Norbert Dumas
- Succeeded by: None; district abolished in redistribution

Personal details
- Born: September 28, 1785 Montreal, Old Province of Quebec
- Died: May 27, 1855 (aged 69) L'Assomption, Canada East, Province of Canada
- Resting place: Église Notre-Dame-des-Champs, Repentigny, Quebec
- Party: Lower Canada: Parti Patriote; Province of Canada: French-Canadian Group; Ministerialist
- Spouses: (1) Marie-Ermine Turgeon (July 19, 1824–June 9, 1839 (her death)); (2) Aurélie Faribault (September 10, 1843–May 27, 1855 (his death))
- Relations: Denis Viger (uncle) ∟ Denis-Benjamin Viger (cousin); Jacques Viger (uncle) ∟ Jacques Viger fils (cousin); Joseph Viger (uncle); Joseph Papineau (uncle) ∟ Louis-Joseph Papineau (cousin) ∟Denis-Benjamin Papineau (cousin); Côme-Séraphin Cherrier (cousin); Louis Turgeon (father-in-law)
- Children: 4 children
- Occupation: Banker
- Profession: Lawyer
- Nickname: Le beau Viger

Military service
- Allegiance: Britain
- Branch/service: Lower Canada militia
- Years of service: 1812 to 1827
- Rank: Captain
- Unit: 2nd Militia Battalion, Montreal; 5th Select Embodied Militia Battalion
- Battles/wars: War of 1812

Louis-Michel Viger (French pronunciation: [lwi miʃɛl viʒe]; September 28, 1785 – May 27, 1855) was a lawyer, banker, businessman, seigneur and political figure in Lower Canada, and then in Canada East in the Province of Canada.

== Family and early life ==
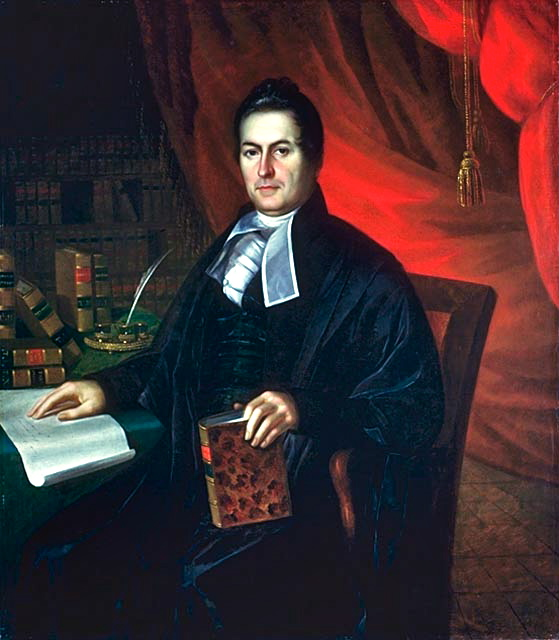
Louis-Joseph Papineau, one of Viger's cousins and major Patriote leader

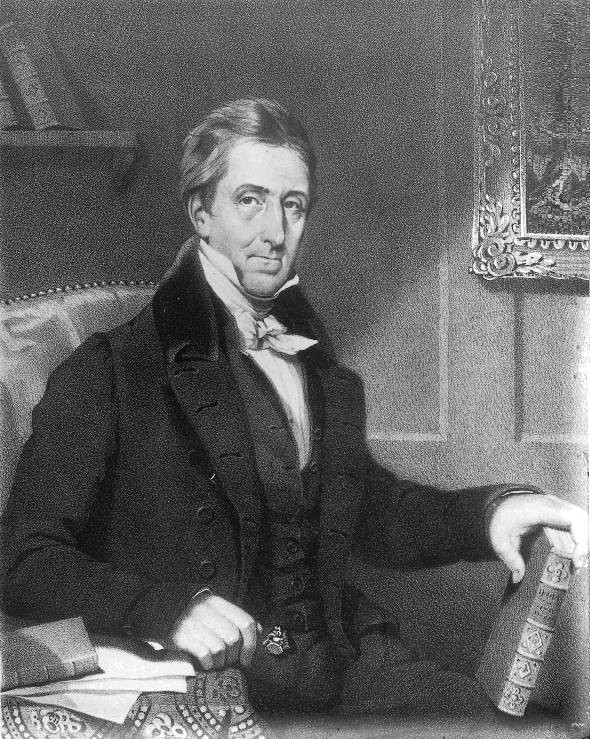
Denis-Benjamin Viger, another of Viger's cousins, also a Patriote

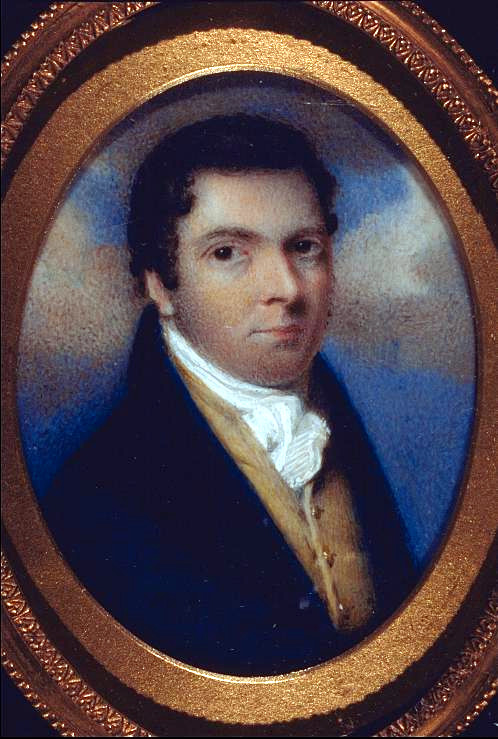
Côme-Seraphin Cherrier, another cousin, Patriote, and law partner

Viger was born in 1785 in Montreal, in the old Province of Quebec. His parents were Louis Viger and Marie-Agnès Papineau, who were part of a rising professional middle class. Their families were also heavily involved in the political life of the province of Lower Canada, created in 1791.

Louis-Michel's grandfather had been a shoemaker, but his four sons all advanced in the social scale. Louis-Michel's father, Louis, began as a blacksmith but eventually became an ironmaster. One of Louis-Michel's uncles, Denis Viger, began as a carpenter but developed a business selling potash to English markets. Another uncle, Joseph Viger, became a lumber merchant, while another uncle, Jacques Viger, was an artisan. All three uncles were elected to the Legislative Assembly of Lower Canada.

Louis-Michel's mother, Marie-Agnès Papineau, was the sister of Joseph Papineau, who began as a surveyor and then became a notary. Joseph Papineau also became a member of the Legislative Assembly.

Several of Louis-Michel's cousins became prominent in the political life of Lower Canada. Louis-Joseph Papineau, son of Joseph Papineau, became the leader of the Parti canadien (later called the Parti patriote) and the Speaker of the Legislative Assembly. He was the most significant leader in the struggles with the appointed governor of the province, and in the Lower Canada Rebellion of 1837–1838. Denis-Benjamin Papineau, brother of Louis-Joseph, was also involved in provincial politics, and became joint premier of the new Province of Canada. Another of Louis-Michel's cousins, Denis-Benjamin Viger, son of Denis Viger, was heavily involved with the Parti patriote and also became joint premier of the Province of Canada, while another cousin, Jacques Viger fils, was the first mayor of Montreal. A cousin on his mother's side, Côme-Séraphin Cherrier, also became a lawyer and was active in the Patriote movement.

Louis-Michel Viger studied at the Collège Saint-Raphaël in Montreal, gaining a classical education. He was a student at the same time as his cousin, Louis-Joseph Papineau. The two cousins formed a life-long friendship. After his studies at Collège Saint-Raphaël, Viger articled in law with his cousin, Denis-Benjamin Viger.

Louis-Michel Viger was admitted to the bar in 1807 and set up practice in Montreal. He quickly gained a reputation as a brilliant and popular young lawyer known for his diligence and competence, as well as his kindness. He developed a large practice, eventually entering into partnership with his cousin Côme-Séraphin Cherrier. His family connections gave him the entrée to many social settings in Montreal, and he acquired the nickname, Le beau Viger. He also began to invest in real estate, and by 1825 his properties in the old town of Montreal were bringing in between £100 and £200 annually.

In 1824, he married Marie-Ermine Turgeon. They would have four children. Marie-Ermine was the daughter of Louis Turgeon, seigneur of Beaumont, who was a member of the Legislative Council of Lower Canada, and had formerly been a member of the Legislative Assembly, supporting the Parti canadien. Louis Turgeon's brother, and Marie-Ermine's uncle, was Pierre-Flavien Turgeon, future Archbishop of Quebec.

== Militia service ==
In 1807, there was a threat of invasion by the United States. Viger joined the Lower Canada militia in 1808, commissioned as an ensign. During the War of 1812, he was commissioned as a lieutenant in the 2nd Militia Battalion of Montreal in 1812, and in 1814 was commissioned as a captain. He was also commissioned as a lieutenant in the 5th Select Embodied Militia Battalion of Lower Canada. He served throughout the war, demonstrating his support for the British colonial government.

== Lower Canada politics ==
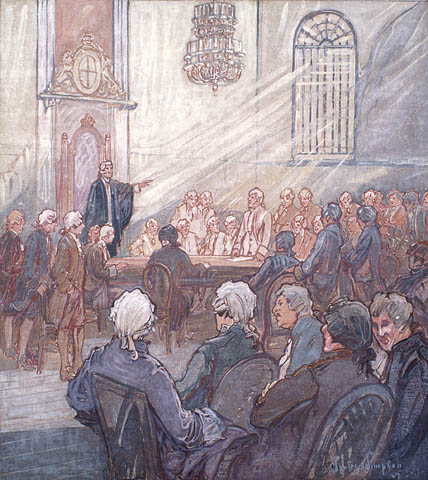
Legislative Assembly of Lower Canada meeting in the Bishop's Chapel, Quebec

Viger became involved in politics in Lower Canada around the time he was called to the bar. Canadiens of his generation were developing a new form of French-Canadian identity and nationalism, linked to self-government and liberty. His cousins Louis-Joseph Papineau and Denis-Benjamin Viger had both been elected in 1809, beginning their long political careers; both were re-elected in the general elections of 1810, called by Governor Craig in reaction to an impasse with the Legislative Assembly. Louis-Michel Viger was likely starting to be involved in Parti canadien politics, although not himself a candidate. When senior government officials and businessmen circulated a letter of congratulations to Craig, asking for signatures, Viger refused to sign the letter and successfully encouraged others in the Montreal business community to refuse as well. He was accused by two justices of the peace of disloyalty to the government and interfering in the electoral process, but no charges were laid.

Viger became more active in politics as time passed, to the point where he was stripped of his commission in the militia in 1824, after participating in a public meeting that passed resolutions criticising the financial policies of Governor Dalhousie. In 1830, at the urging of Louis-Joseph Papineau, he stood for election in the two-member riding of Chambly, taking the place of his cousin, Denis-Benjamin Viger, who had given up his seat in the assembly to take an appointment to the Legislative Council. Louis-Michel Viger was elected, along with Frédéric-Auguste Quesnel, both as members of the Parti canadien.

In the assembly, Viger was a strong, dependable supporter of Papineau. In 1834, he voted in favour of the Ninety-Two Resolutions proposed by Papineau, highly critical of the colonial government and calling for substantive constitutional changes, including making the Legislative Council an elected body, instead of appointed by the Governor. In the general elections later in 1834, the Parti canadien campaigned on the Ninety-Two Resolutions and won a strong majority in the assembly. Viger was re-elected in Chambly; Quesnel, who had voted against the resolutions, was defeated.

== La Banque du Peuple ==
Because of his intensive political involvement, Viger found he did not have time to continue with his legal practice after his election to the assembly. Instead, in 1835 he entered into the banking business in partnership with wealthy Montreal businessman Jacob De Witt. The Bank of Montreal had a near-monopoly on banking in the province, and was dominated by English-Canadian business interests. Viger's goal was the creation of a bank to provide credit for French-Canadian businessmen and farmers, breaking the Bank of Montreal's dominance. Viger and De Witt set up a private bank, originally called Viger, De Witt et Compagnie, and later La Banque du Peuple, as a partnership of Viger, De Witt, and ten other investors. The initial capitalisation, provided by the twelve partners, was £75,000, a large portion coming from De Witt.

Papineau was initially sceptical of Viger's plan, warning that the Banque would be "the tomb of your popularity and even your patriotism". As time passed, Papineau became more approving, seeing the value of the Banque to counter the English dominance of business credit and financing in Lower Canada. He encouraged French-Canadian businesses to use the Banque. Under the direction of Viger and De Witt, the Banque was successful.

== Lower Canada Rebellion, 1837–1838 ==
Assembly of the Six Counties, October 23, 1837

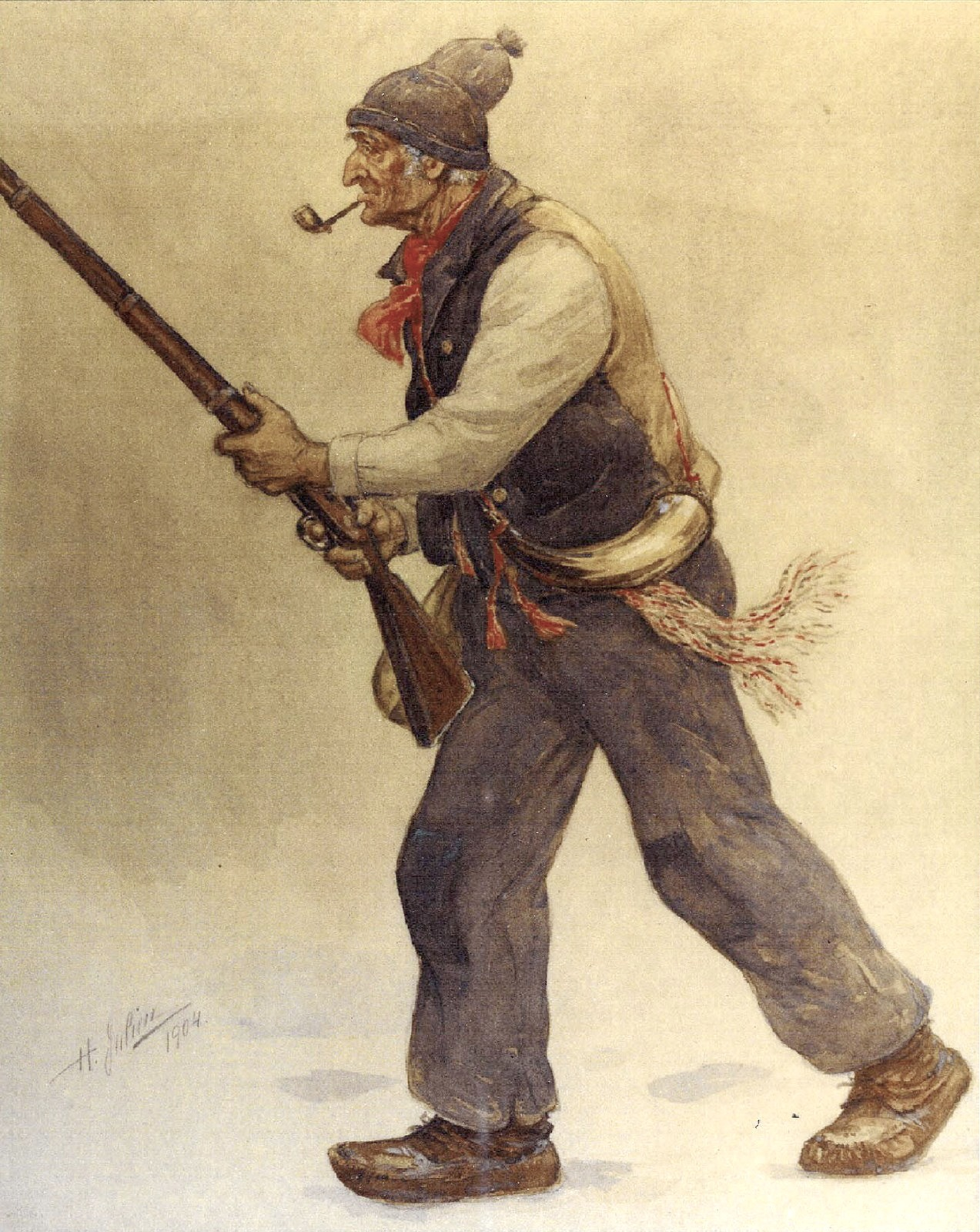
Henri Julien's drawing of an armed Patriote in the 1837 Rebellion

In March, 1837, the British House of Commons rejected the demands set out in the Ninety-Two Resolutions, and instead passed the Russell Resolutions, proposed by the Home Secretary, Lord John Russell. The Russell Resolutions would have increased the power of the Governor over the provincial finances, undercutting the existing authority of the elected Legislative Assembly. News of the Russell Resolutions immediately heightened tensions in Lower Canada. The British response appeared to cut off the option of peaceful constitutional change. Talk of rebellion increased.

Viger's support of the Patriote movement increased in response to the Russell Resolutions. He participated in public protest meetings organised by the Patriotes, and joined Papineau's call for a boycott of British goods. When the assembly met in August, he and De Witt appeared wearing clothes made from homespun cloth, part of the boycott. At one of the most significant public rallies in October 1837, the Assembly of the Six Counties, Viger appeared on the platform with Papineau and spoke immediately after his cousin.

As tensions grew, there were rumours that the Banque du Peuple was funnelling funds to the Patriotes to purchase arms and other supplies. In particular, there were suspicions that Denis-Benjamin Viger, who was one of the leaders of the Patriote movement, may have had an undisclosed financial interest in the Banque. Denis-Benjamin Viger was very successful financially, his picture was on the ten-dollar banknote issued by the Banque, and he had close family ties to Louis-Michel Viger and to Papineau.

When the Rebellion broke out in November 1837, Louis-Michel Viger was arrested and charged with treason. There was speculation that the British authorities arrested him to weaken the Banque. One of the directors of the Banque, Édouard-Raymond Fabre, then made a hurried trip to Saint Denis, where Papineau was staying, and met with him shortly before the Battle of Saint Denis. The reason for the trip and the meeting have never been identified. What is clear is that two days after the Patriote victory at Saint Denis, De Witt and the other directors of the Banque who were still at liberty published a sworn deposition that the Banque du Peuple had no role in funding the Patriotes.

Viger was detained in prison for nearly a year, but was never brought to trial. His lawyer, William Walker, made four different applications for habeas corpus over the course of 1837 and 1838. Viger was finally released in August, 1838, having posted bail of £2,000. When the Rebellion broke out again in November, 1838, he was again arrested, but was freed in December, 1838.

In response to the Rebellion, the British government suspended the constitution of Lower Canada. The provincial Parliament and Executive Council were replaced by the Special Council of Lower Canada, appointed by the Governor, and composed largely of British-Canadians and upper-class French-Canadians. Viger lost his seat in the assembly as a result.

Once released from prison, Viger withdrew from public life, likely exhausted from his imprisonment. As well, his wife, Marie-Ermine, died in June, 1839. Viger spent the two years after his release attending to his personal affairs. He also handled the personal affairs of Papineau, who was in exile in the United States and then France until 1845.

== Province of Canada politics ==
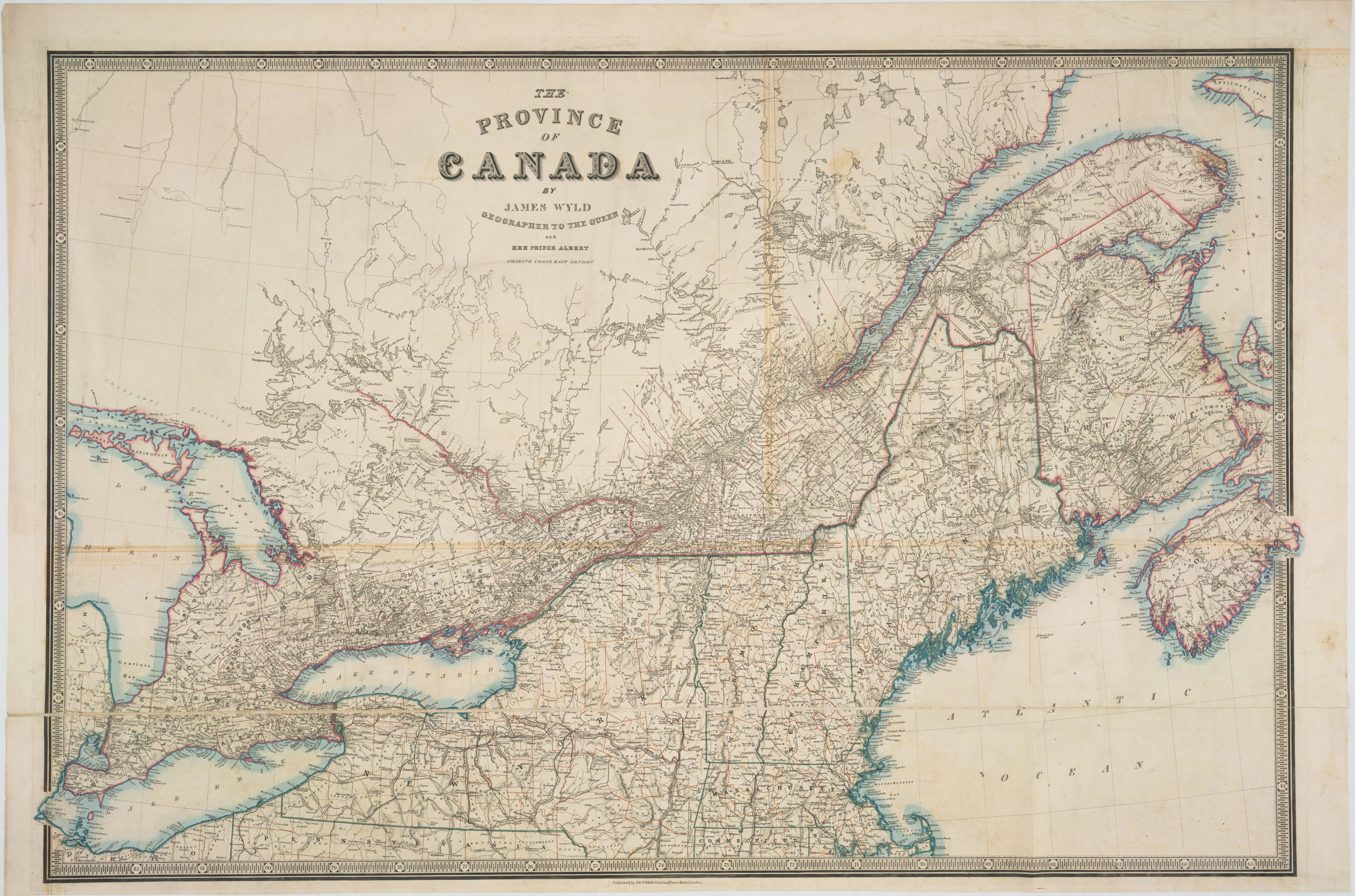
Map of the Province of Canada

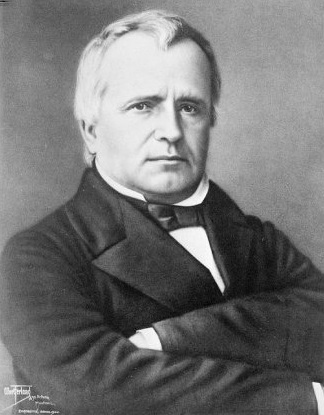
Louis-Hippolyte LaFontaine, leader of the French-Canadian Group and first joint-premier from Canada East

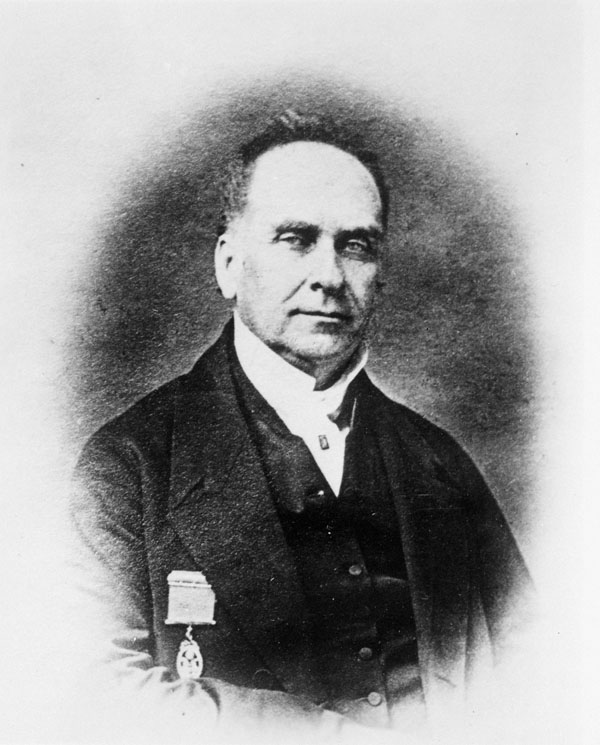
Robert Baldwin, leader of the Canada West Reformers and first joint-premier from Canada West

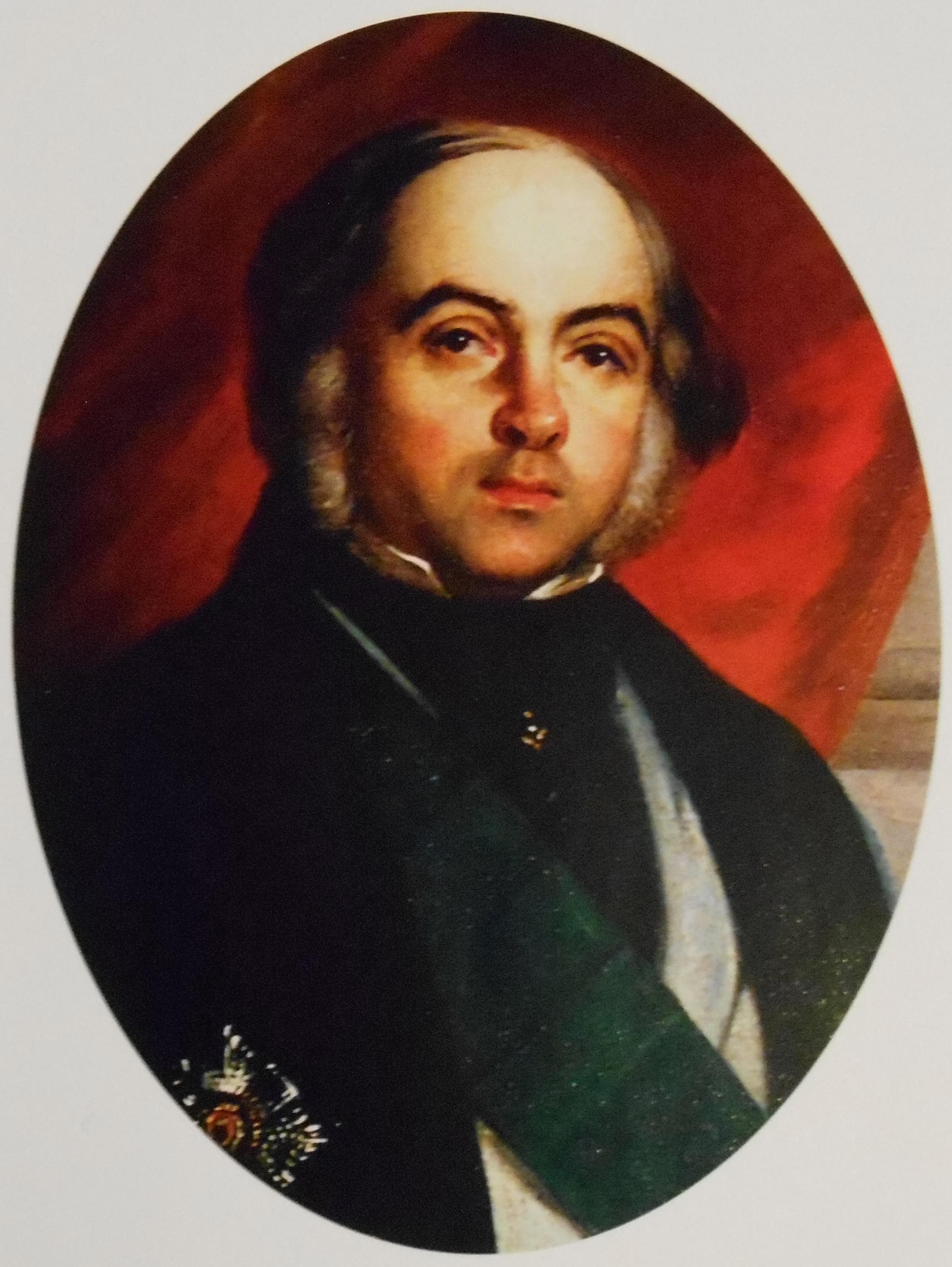
Governor General Lord Elgin, who granted royal assent to the Rebellion Losses Bill

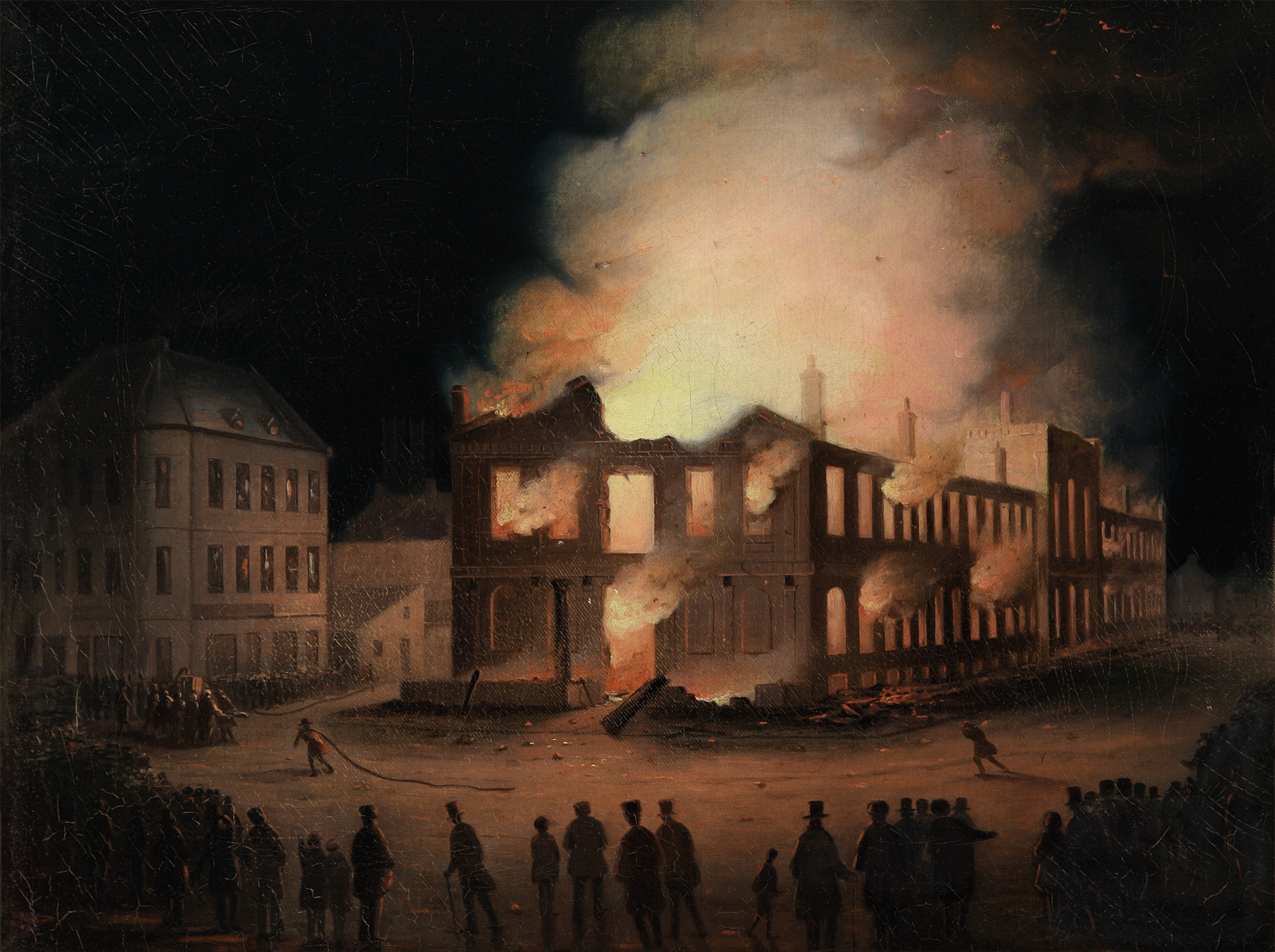
The Montreal Parliament Building, after Lord Elgin granted royal assent to the bill

Following the rebellion in Lower Canada, and the similar rebellion in 1837 in Upper Canada (now Ontario), the British government decided to merge the two provinces into a single province, as recommended by Lord Durham in the Durham Report. The Union Act, 1840, passed by the British Parliament, abolished the two provinces and their separate parliaments. It created the Province of Canada, with a single Parliament for the entire province, composed of an elected Legislative Assembly and an appointed Legislative Council. The Governor General initially retained a strong position in the government.

Viger returned to public life. He joined in the protests in the Montreal area against the merger into the Province of Canada. Like Denis-Benjamin Viger and Louis-Hippolyte LaFontaine, he signed a petition against the union in 1840, criticising the support for union given by the Special Council and the Parliament of Upper Canada. In the general elections of 1841, Viger stood for election in his former riding of Chambly, campaigning as an opponent of the union. He was defeated by John Yule, who supported the union and the British governor general, Lord Sydenham. There was electoral violence, as was common at the time, and Viger was defeated by ten votes, after supporters of Yule seized control of the hustings. Following the elections, Viger, LaFontaine and four other defeated candidates filed elections petitions with the Legislative Assembly, seeking to have the elections in their ridings overturned for electoral violence and other irregularities, but the assembly dismissed the petitions on technical grounds.

In 1842, a vacancy occurred in the riding of Nicolet. Viger was elected to the Legislative Assembly in the resulting by-election. He joined the French-Canadian Group, along with his cousin Denis-Benjamin Viger and LaFontaine. In 1843, there was a major dispute over the role of the governor general and his relationship with the Executive Council. LaFontaine and almost all the members of the Council resigned, and were supported by a majority in the assembly, including Louis-Michel Viger. Denis-Benjamin Viger, however, took the side of Governor General Metcalfe, who appointed him to the Executive Council. When Metcalfe called the general elections in 1844, LaFontaine successfully challenged Denis-Benjamin Viger for control of the French-Canadian Group. Louis-Michel Viger chose not to stand for election.

In the general elections of 1848, LaFontaine and the French-Canadian Group carried a majority of seats in Canada East, and Robert Baldwin and the Reform group won a majority of seats in Canada West. Under the new principle of responsible government, Governor General Lord Elgin invited LaFontaine and Baldwin to form a government. LaFontaine appointed Viger to the Executive Council as receiver general. Viger had been an unsuccessful candidate in the general elections for the riding of Leinster, but he was elected in a by-election in the Terrebonne riding. Papineau, returned from exile and also elected to the assembly, criticised Viger for taking an appointment in the union government that he had originally opposed.

In the parliamentary session of 1849, held in Montreal, one of the major government initiatives was the Rebellion Losses Bill, which would provide compensation to residents of Lower Canada who had suffered property losses during the Rebellion. It was an important measure for LaFontaine, to demonstrate that the new system of responsible government could satisfy the political needs of French-Canadians. All of the members of the French-Canadian Group, including Viger, voted for the bill. It was strongly opposed by Tories, who saw it as a reward to French-Canadians for their rebellion. After the bill passed Parliament, it went to Governor General Elgin. The Tories pressured him to refuse to grant royal assent, but acting on the advice of LaFontaine and Baldwin, he granted assent on April 25, 1949. That night, Tory opponents of the bill began to riot in Montreal, eventually setting fire to the Parliament building. As a result, the members of Parliament decided to move the rest of their sessions to Toronto. Although he had supported the bill, Viger opposed the decision to move the Parliament from Montreal and resigned from the executive council in protest, continuing to sit as a backbencher in the assembly.

Viger was elected to the assembly again in the general elections of 1851, this time for the Leinster riding. He did not hold a position in the executive council. He retired from politics prior to the general elections of 1854.

== Later life and death ==
Viger re-married in 1843, to Aurélie, the daughter of Joseph-Édouard Faribault. She was the seigneur of Saint-Ours in L'Assomption, which she had inherited after the death of her first husband. In 1848, Viger purchased the seigneury of Repentigny, an indication that he was financially well-off.

Even while he was involved in politics, Viger continued his business interests. Under the management of Viger and De Witt, the Banque du Peuple had survived and prospered. In 1844, they obtained a charter from the provincial Parliament, this time with a capitalisation of £200,000. In 1845, he was appointed president of the Banque, a position he held for the rest of his life, with De Witt as vice-president. In 1846, Viger was appointed an honorary director of a new bank, the Montreal City and District Savings Bank, set up to provide a savings bank for French-Canadians. That bank is still in business as of 2024, under the name Laurentian Bank of Canada.

Louis-Michel Viger died of a paralytic stroke in L'Assomption in 1855 and was buried at Repentigny. He left the seigneury of Repentigny and several other properties to his widow.

When he heard the news of Viger's death, Louis-Joseph Papineau wrote in a letter to Jean-Joseph Girouard, another veteran of the Patriote movement and the Rebellion:

"My friend and kinsman of the heart and of boyhood, with whom I grew up like a brother, Louis Viger, only one year older than I, is gone, and I learn this just as I write to you."
