= Marie-Amable Foretier =

Lower Canada humanitarian for the poor

Marie-Amable Foretier (1778-1854) was a philanthropist in Lower Canada (now Quebec).

She was the daughter of Thérèse Legrand and Pierre Foretier, and the eleventh child of their family of fourteen. The family was well-off, with a large house, including a well-stocked library. Her father was a businessman and a landowner in the seigneurial system. Her mother had brought the family home into the marriage, ceded by her parents.

At age 30, Foretier married Denis-Benjamin Viger, a lawyer in Montreal and member of the Legislative Assembly of Lower Canada. The couple only had one child, who died in infancy.

The couple became well-off financially. Viger inherited land and houses in Montreal from his parents and invested his earnings from his law practice in land. When Foretier's parents died, she also inherited land, including her father's seigneurie on Île Bizard, one of the Montreal islands. However, her inheritance was tied up in litigation for many years, because her father had put a clause in his will that attempted to exclude Viger from management of her inheritance.

Foretier played a significant role in managing their many properties in Montreal, because of her husband's frequent absences from their home. Viger was heavily involved in the politics of Lower Canada for the next forty years, first as a member of the Parti canadien, then as a member of the more nationalist Parti patriote. His work took him away from their home for long periods, attending Parliament in Quebec City, and also in delegations to London, representing the interests of Lower Canada.

Throughout her life, Foretier used her financial resources to assist numerous charities, dedicated to improving life for those at the lower socio-economic scale. She was an early member of the Association des dames bienveillantes de Saint-Jacques, which began in 1828, working particularly on the committee which provided educational assistance to poor girls. She was the treasurer of the Association for three years. She was a major supporter of the Association des Dames de la Charité, which provided support to young women, orphans, and aged and infirm persons. In 1833, she was one of the group of women who successfully petitioned the Lower Canada Legislative Assembly for financial grants of up to £500 for the support of widows and orphans in Montreal. From 1836 to 1846, she was the president of the Charitable Institution for Female Penitents, and donated a plot of land on Sherbrooke Street to the Institution. From 1841 until her death, she was president of the Roman Catholic Orphan Asylum of Montreal, and a life member of the council of administration of the Montreal Asylum for Aged and Infirm Women. She likely influenced her husband to introduce bills for the incorporation of the two asylums.

Foretier died in 1854 from cholera. The historian Joseph Royal stated that she deserved the title "mother of the poor" of Montreal. Louis-Joseph Papineau, a major political leader and cousin of her husband, wrote: "How inclined she was to believe the best of a person and how ready to do good; how far removed she was from thinking evil possible, and how incapable of speaking ill of anyone at all."
