= Denis-Benjamin Viger =

Lower Canada lawyer, journalist and politician

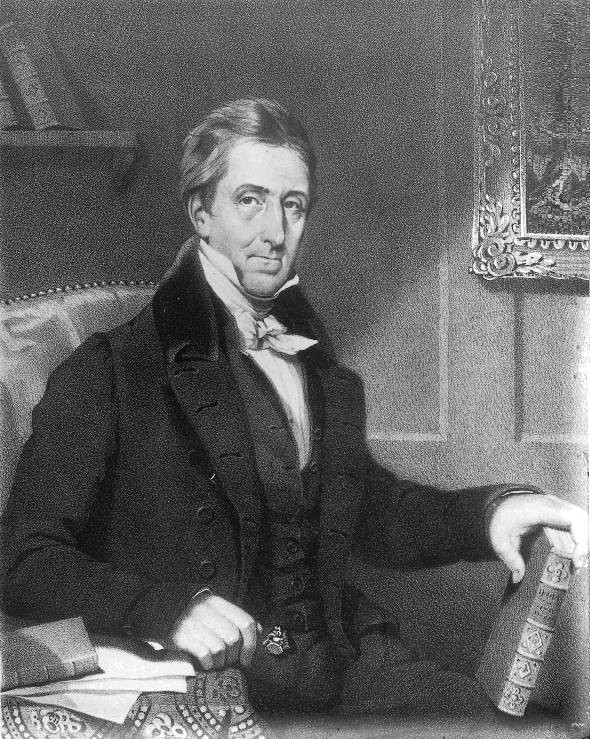
- Denis-Benjamin Viger by Théophile Hamel

Joint Premier of the Province of Canada (Canada East)
- In office December 12, 1843 – June 17, 1846 Serving with William Henry Draper
- Monarch: Queen Victoria
- Governors General: Sir Charles Metcalfe; Earl Cathcart
- Preceded by: Dominick Daly (acting)
- Succeeded by: Denis-Benjamin Papineau

Member of the Legislative Assembly of Lower Canada
- In office 1808 – 1829 (three different electoral districts, nine elections; for details, see succession box at end of article)

Member of the Legislative Council of Lower Canada
- In office 1829–1838

Member of the Legislative Assembly of the Province of Canada for Richelieu
- In office 1841–1844
- Preceded by: New position
- Succeeded by: Wolfred Nelson

Member of the Legislative Assembly of the Province of Canada for Three-Rivers
- In office 1845–1847
- Preceded by: Edward Greive
- Succeeded by: Antoine Polette

Member of the Legislative Council of the Province of Canada
- In office February 17, 1848 – March 17, 1858
- Succeeded by: None; constitution suspended

Personal details
- Born: August 19, 1774 Montreal, Old Province of Quebec
- Died: February 13, 1861 (aged 86) Montreal, Canada East, Province of Canada
- Party: Lower Canada: Parti canadien / Parti patriote (1808–1838); Province of Canada: French-Canadian Group (1841–1843) "British" Tory (1843–1847)
- Spouse: Marie-Amable Foretier (d. July 22, 1854)
- Relations: Denis Viger (father); Jacques Viger (uncle) ∟Jacques Viger fils (cousin); Joseph Viger (uncle); Louis-Michel Viger (cousin); François-Pierre Cherrier (maternal grandfather) ∟ Benjamin-Hyacinthe-Martin Cherrier (uncle) ∟ Séraphin Cherrier (uncle) ∟ Côme-Séraphin Cherrier (cousin); Joseph Papineau (uncle by marriage) ∟ Louis-Joseph Papineau (cousin) ∟ Denis-Benjamin Papineau (cousin); Pierre Foretier (father-in-law); Louis-Michel Viger (cousin); Jean-Jacques Lartigue (cousin)
- Education: Collège Saint-Raphaël
- Occupation: Journalist, landowner
- Profession: Lawyer
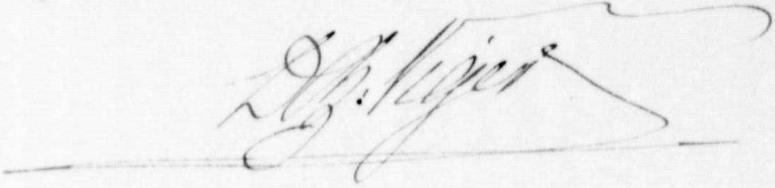
- Signature
- Nickname: Le Vénérable

Military service
- Allegiance: British Empire
- Branch/service: Lower Canada militia
- Years of service: 1803–1824
- Rank: Lieutenant (1803); Captain (1812); Major (1824)
- Battles/wars: War of 1812

Denis-Benjamin Viger (French pronunciation: [dəni bɛ̃ʒamɛ̃ viʒe]; August 19, 1774 – February 13, 1861) was a 19th-century politician, lawyer, and newspaper publisher in Lower Canada, who served as joint premier of the Province of Canada for over two years. A leader in the Patriote movement, he was a strong French-Canadian nationalist, but a social conservative in terms of the seigneurial system and the position of the Catholic church in Lower Canada.

Viger came from a well-connected middle class family. Trained as a lawyer, he invested in land and gradually became one of Montreal's largest landowners. He held public office for most of his adult life, often working alongside his cousin, Louis-Joseph Papineau, a fiery nationalist. From 1808 to 1829, he was a member of the elected Legislative Assembly of Lower Canada, then from 1829 to 1838 he was a member of the appointed Legislative Council, the upper house of the Parliament of Lower Canada.

Imprisoned during the Lower Canada Rebellion in 1838, he was subsequently elected to the Legislative Assembly of the Province of Canada in 1841. From 1843 to 1846, he served as a joint-premier of the province, which triggered criticism from his former party colleagues. He was later appointed to the Legislative Council of the Province of Canada, serving from 1848 to 1858.

In his later years, Viger lived quietly in Montreal, surrounded by his well-stocked library. He remained fond of entertaining, and his wine-cellar was said to be one of the best in Montreal. He died in 1861, at the age of 86.

== Early life and family ==
Viger was born in Montreal to Denis Viger and Périne-Charles Cherrier, daughter of François-Pierre Cherrier, a merchant and notary.

The Viger family was part of a rising middle class. Denis-Benjamin's grandfather, Jacques Viger, had been a shoemaker. Denis-Benjamin's father, Denis Viger, began as a carpenter, branched out into small construction projects, and then developed a business selling potash to English markets. Denis Viger represented the electoral constituency of Montreal East in the Legislative Assembly of Lower Canada from 1796 to 1800. Denis Viger's two brothers, Jacques Viger and Joseph Viger, were also members of the Assembly. Jacques' son Jacques Viger fils (cousin to Denis-Benjamin), became the first mayor of Montreal. Another cousin, Louis-Michel Viger, became one of the founding partners of the Banque du Peuple.

Through his mother, Denis-Benjamin was related to the Cherrier and Papineau families: Louis-Joseph Papineau, the future leader of the Parti patriote, was his cousin, as was Jean-Jacques Lartigue, future Bishop of Montreal. In 1801, Denis-Benjamin's parents took in one of his cousins, Côme-Séraphin Cherrier, aged three when his mother died, and raised him in their family. Côme-Séraphin was later elected to the Assembly as well.

In 1782, Viger's father sent him to the Collège Saint-Raphaël, run by the Sulpician order. He had no difficulty in completing his studies. Upon graduation, he trained in the law from 1794 to 1799, first under Louis-Charles Foucher, the solicitor-general for the province, then under Joseph Bédard, brother of the leader of the Parti canadien, and finally under Jean-Antoine Panet, the speaker of the Legislative Assembly. In addition to learning the law, he learnt about the allure of politics, coupled with a commitment to public service.

Viger joined the militia as a lieutenant in 1803. By the time of the War of 1812, he was a captain. Like many other French-Canadians he fought alongside English-Canadians against the Americans. He retired from the militia in 1824 with the rank of major.

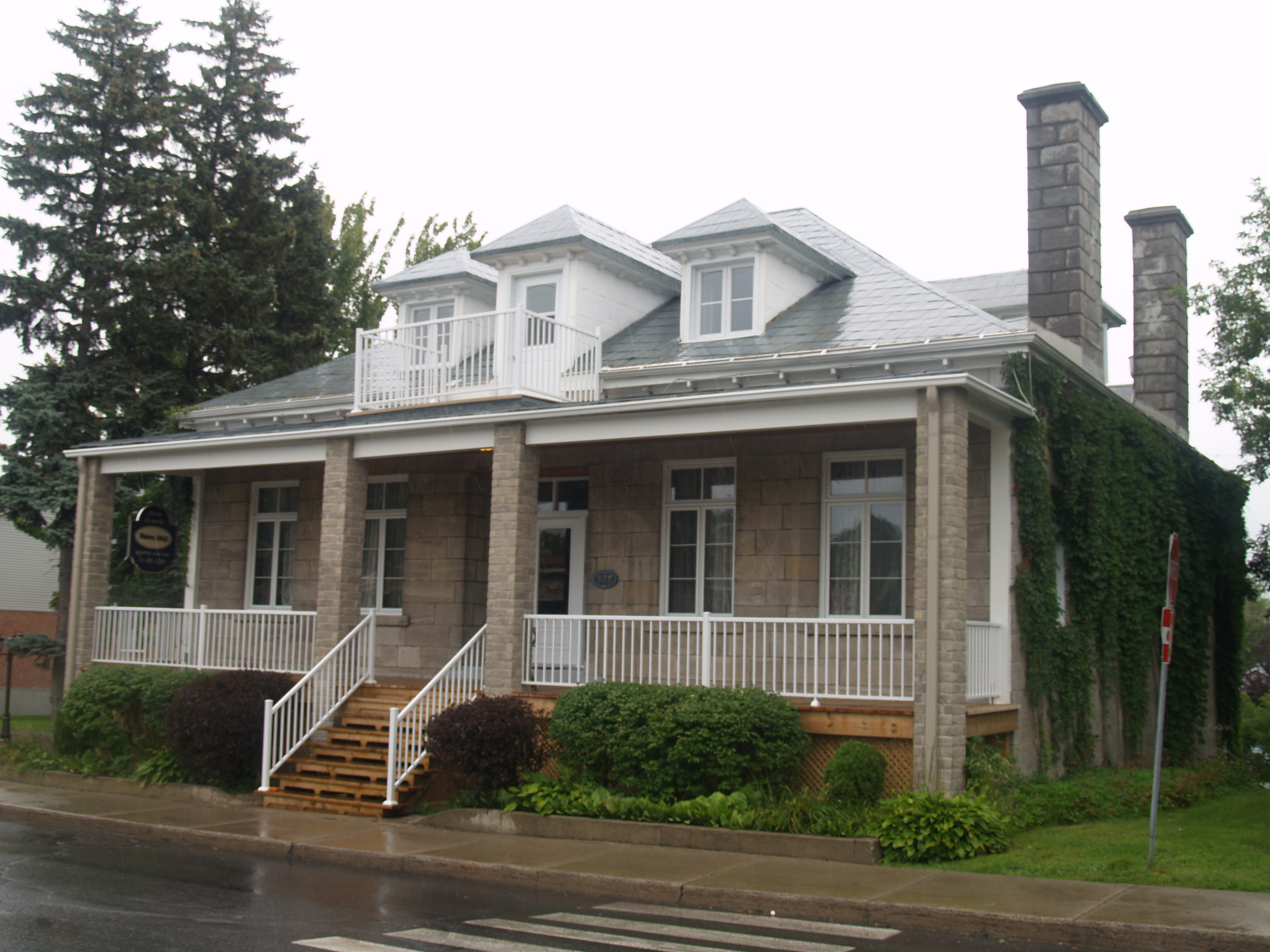
Maison Dénis-Benjamin Viger, 376, rue Cherrier, Île Bizard, Montreal

In 1808, Viger married Marie-Amable Foretier. They had one child who died in infancy in 1814. Marie-Amable was the daughter of Pierre Foretier, a seigneur who had a well-established business in connection with the fur trade. By their marriage, Viger entered the established, aristocratic class. When her father died in 1815, Marie-Amable became an heir to his estate, but the estate was tied up in litigation for twenty-five years. It was not until 1842 that Marie-Amable finally obtained her father's seigneurie on Île Bizard, one of the Montreal islands. Throughout her life, Marie-Amable was involved in charitable activities, focussing on the underprivileged. She was a founder of the Institution pour les Filles Repenties, and was president of the Orphelinat Catholique de Montréal.

== Legal career, journalism and landholdings ==
Viger entered the legal profession in 1799. Although skilled in the law and idealistic, he lacked charisma or personal presence. As time went on, he became very comfortable financially, but it is not clear how much of that came from his legal practice, and how much from land investments. He bought land and houses himself, and in 1823 inherited substantial land holdings from his parents, becoming one of the most important landowners in Montreal. At one point he donated a plot of land to his cousin, Jean-Jacques Lartigue, Bishop of Montreal, for a new building. There was some malicious gossip that the donated land was close to many of his other landholdings, which would likely increase their value as a result.

Even before he completed his legal studies, Viger began writing articles on political issues for the newspapers, with the first appearing in 1792 in the Montreal Gazette. He gradually acquired financial interests in other newspapers, including the Canadian Spectator, La Minerve and L'Ordre. His writings at this time indicated an early interest in political issues, taken from an intellectual point of view. Throughout his life he wrote books and articles on political issues, particularly relating to the constitutional position of Lower Canada. He was a good writer, logical, thoughtful, and showing a depth of knowledge. He was also an enthusiastic book-buyer, focussing on law and politics, but he was not very interested in fiction.

When Viger was an established lawyer, he took in law students. One of his students was Augustin-Norbert Morin, who was also a future joint premier. During his time with Viger, Morin taught Latin and mathematics in order to earn additional money. Viger did not have a reputation of generosity towards his law clerks.

== Lower Canada politics ==
=== Member of the Legislative Assembly, 1808 to 1829 ===
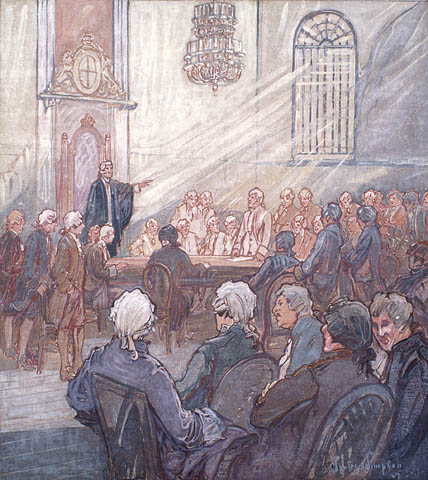
Legislative Assembly of Lower Canada, meeting in the Bishop's Chapel, Quebec

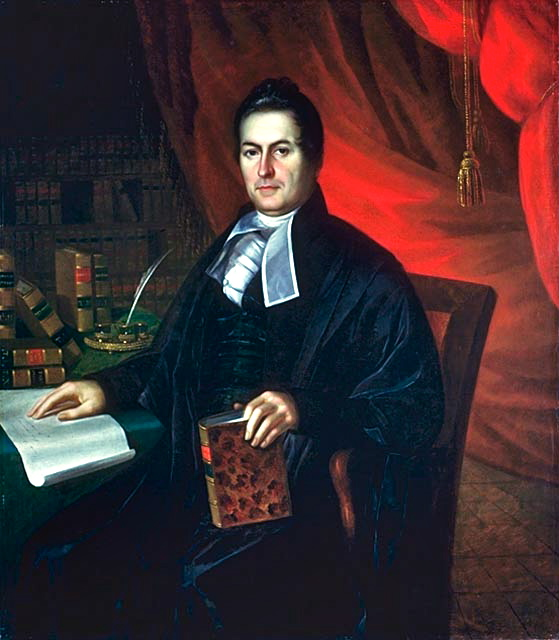
Viger's cousin, Louis-Joseph Papineau, who became leader of the Parti canadien

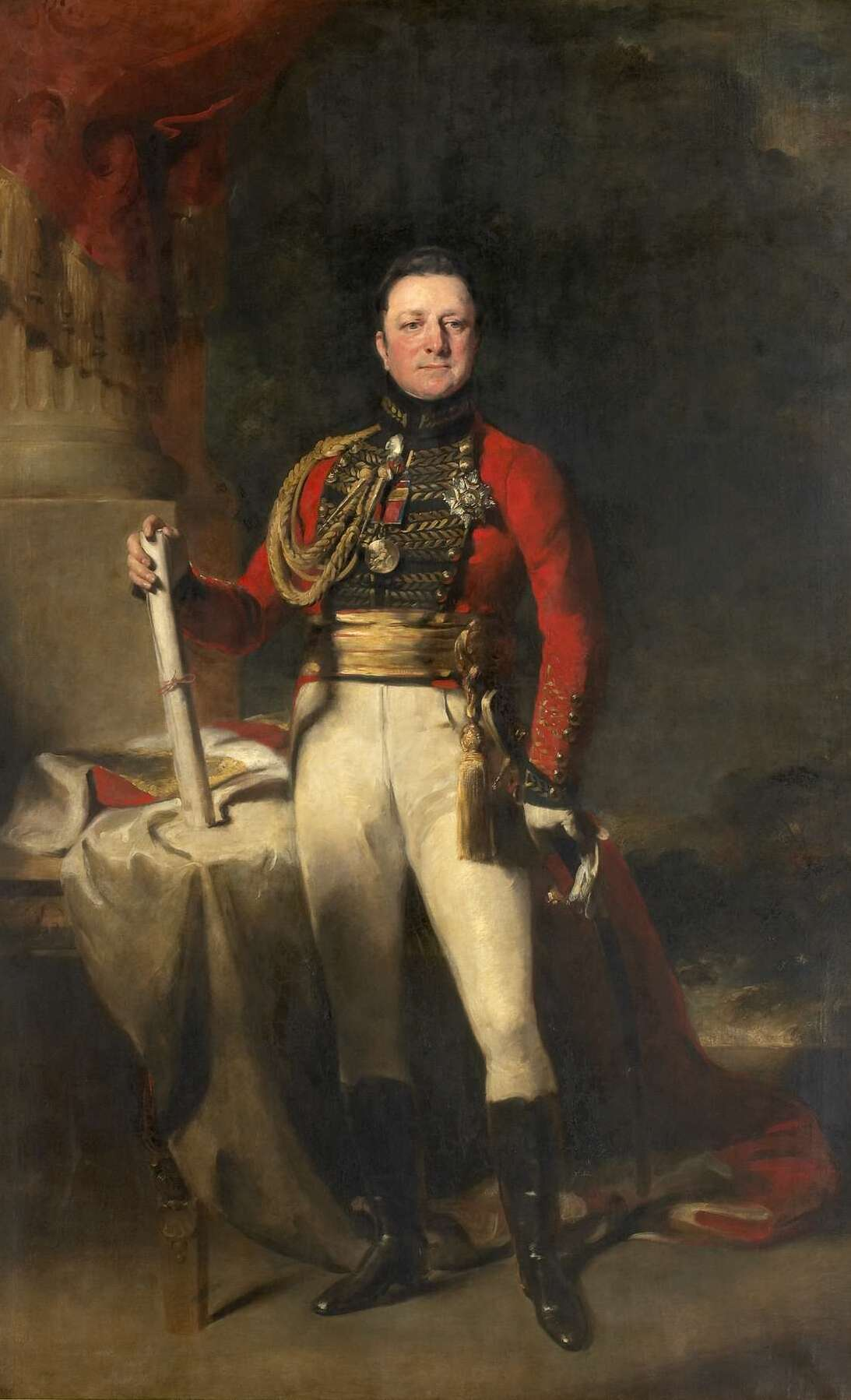
Earl of Dalhousie, Governor General of British North America, 1820–1828, the target of the Parti canadien in the debate over control of public finances

In 1804, at age 30, Viger entered electoral politics, unsuccessfully contesting a seat in Montreal. Four years later, in 1808, he was elected to the Legislative Assembly of Lower Canada from Montreal West, and was re-elected in 1809. He was elected in Leinster County in 1810 and 1814, and then regularly elected in Kent County from 1816 until 1827, until appointed to the Legislative Council of Lower Canada in 1829.

Viger's younger cousin, Louis-Joseph Papineau, was also elected for the first time in 1808. Papineau was much more dynamic and charismatic than Viger, who was considered retiring and not eloquent. The two worked together, allying themselves with the Parti canadien. They followed the older leaders of the party, first Pierre-Stanislas Bédard, later James Stuart. Eventually, Papineau became the undoubted leader of the party, as it developed into the Parti patriote. Viger helped to develop the intellectual framework for the party.

Viger was a strong admirer of the British constitution, which he considered was an excellent balancing of the royal, aristocratic, and popular elements of the country. Socially conservative, he was distrustful of the various constitutional developments in French, and did not consider American republicanism as an option, unlike his cousin Papineau. He believed that French-Canadian culture and existence was threatened by immigration from the United States and from Britain.

The Parti canadien was focussed on obtaining greater control of the government for the elected Legislative Assembly, and weakening the authority of the appointed Legislative Council and ultimately, the governors, appointed by the British government. They tried different tactics at different times. Under Bédard, the party challenged the Assembly's lack of control over public finances. Stuart brought impeachment hearings against some of the judges who also held positions in the Legislative Council and the Executive Council. When Papineau became Speaker in 1815, he continued the financial tactics, along with a trend towards developing nationalist arguments for French-Canadian control. He also worked on outreach to English-speaking politicians who shared concerns over popular control over public finances, such as John Neilson, who worked closely with Papineau.

Viger was one of the leaders of the party, and was involved in developing its tactics and ideology. In the Assembly and its committees, he defended the seigneurial system, the use of the customary law of Paris in Lower Canada, and the Catholic Church. When his cousin, Jean-Jacques Lartigue, became the first Bishop of Montreal, Viger supported Lartigue in a dispute with the Sulpician order. Viger later acted as a go-between for his two cousins, Lartigue and Papineau, when tensions rose between the church and the Parti canadien in the lead-up to the Lower Canada Rebellion in 1837.

=== Delegations to London ===
In 1822, an issue arose which united most Lower Canada political groups. The British government proposed to unite Lower Canada with Upper Canada into a single province. Papineau and Viger organised opposition to the proposal, with local committees meeting to pass petitions against union. Viger was so heavily involved that opposition to union became known as "Vigerism". Papineau and Neilson were then chosen to be envoys to London, to make the opposition to union known to the British government. They were successful, and the union proposal was shelved.

Six years later, in 1828, there was another delegation to London. Papineau and the Parti canadien had continued to press for greater control of the public finances by the Legislative Assembly. They adopted the same tactic of popular meetings and petitions in support of greater financial control. This time, the delegation to London to press their demands was composed of Neilson, Viger, and Austin Cuvillier, armed with petitions with more than 80,000 signatures. Reform movements were growing in Britain, and the Lower Canada delegation had a favourable reception, both with the Colonial Secretary and before a parliamentary committee set up to consider governance of Lower Canada. The British parliamentary committee issued a report which accepted most of the positions of the delegation.

=== Member of the Legislative Council ===
The next year, 1829, Viger was appointed to the Legislative Council, the upper house of the Parliament of Lower Canada, but did not take his seat until 1831. He did not play a major role in the Council, because that same year the members of the Legislative Assembly appointed him as the Assembly's representative in Britain, over the objections of the Legislative Council. He stayed there from 1831 to 1834, but did not have as successful a time as in the previous delegation.

The increasing radicalisation of the Parti patriote was leading the British government to fear that Papineau and his supporters were seeking republicanism and ultimately independence. It was also driving Neilson and other English-speaking Lower Canadians away from the party, as well as more moderate French-Canadians who had previously supported the Parti canadien, such as Frédéric-Auguste Quesnel. In consequence, the British government was not receptive to Viger's representations, nor those of Augustin-Norbert Morin, whom the Assembly sent over in 1834 to press their concerns. Viger returned to Lower Canada towards the end of 1834. In 1835, he succeeded his cousin Jacques Viger as the second president of the Saint Jean Baptiste Society of Montréal.

Viger remained a member of the Legislative Council until the suspension of the constitution of Lower Canada in 1838, a result of the Lower Canada Rebellion. He was highly critical of the Special Council of Lower Canada, appointed by the Governor General to replace the Parliament.

== Role in the Rebellion ==
Assembly of the Six Counties, October 23, 1837

Front page of La Minerve, around the time of Viger's critique of Bishop Lartigue in August 1837

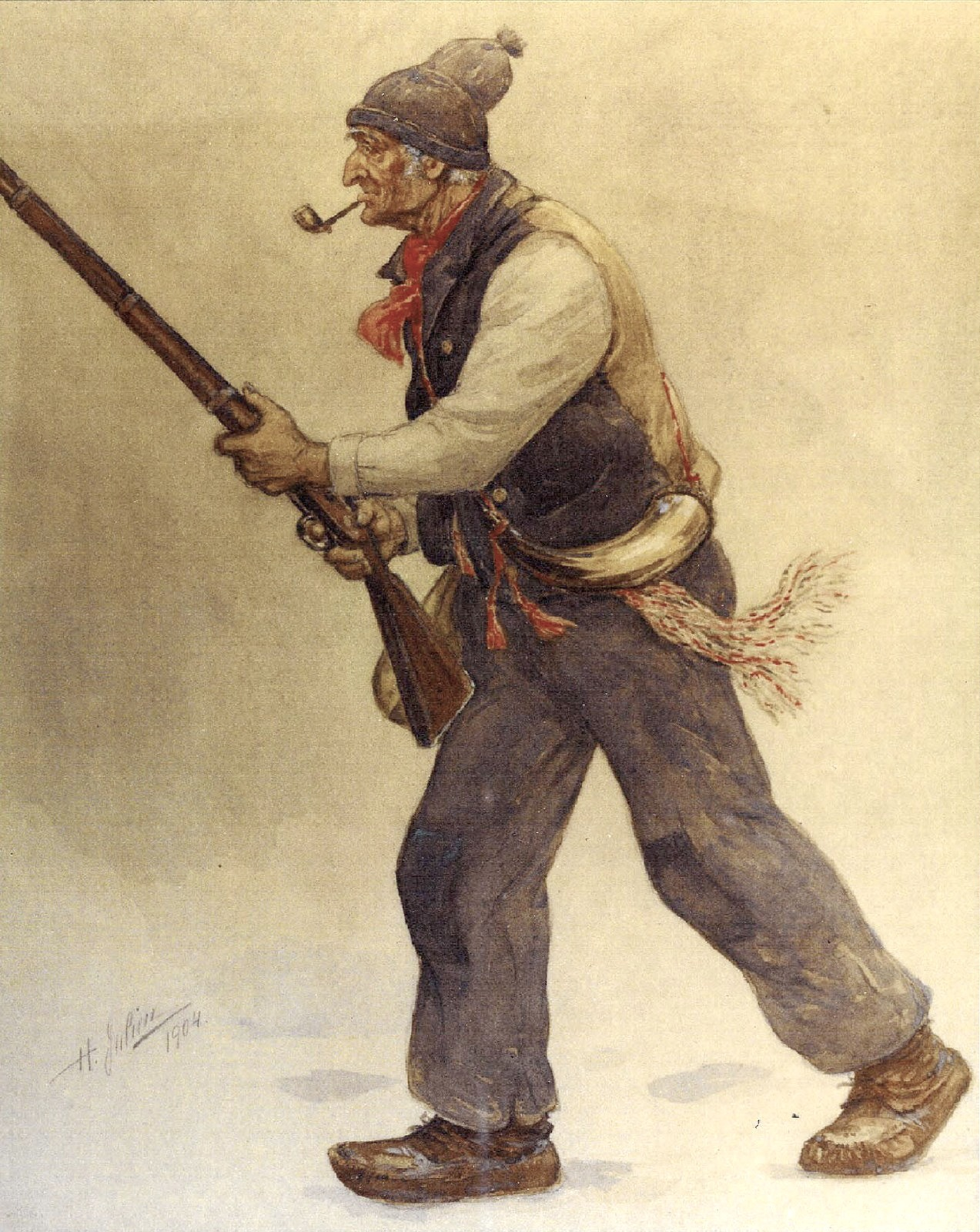
Henri Julien's drawing of an armed Patriote in the 1837 Rebellion

It is not clear exactly what role Viger played in the Lower Canada Rebellions of 1837 and 1838. He was still heavily involved in the Parti patriote with Papineau, and so he is assumed to have participated in planning for the public meetings which were held to increase popular support for the Patriote movement. There is some evidence which suggests that Papineau, Viger and Côme-Séraphin Cherrier had discussions around the time of the most significant of the public meetings, the Assembly of the Six Counties, in which Viger argued against rapid developments, and to wait for the winter freeze-up. He did not appear at the Assembly of the Six Counties, where one of the leaders of the movement, Wolfred Nelson, openly called for rebellion. Nor was he a member of the nascent para-military group, the Société des Fils de la Liberté, but he allowed them to train on his lands.

There were also suspicions that the Banque du Peuple, in which his cousin Louis-Michel Viger was a major investor, was funnelling money to the Patriotes for the purchase of arms. It is not clear what connection Denis-Benjamin Viger had with the Banque, although two historians, Fernand Ouellet and André Lefort, assume that Viger had close links with the directors of the Banque; he was featured on the ten-dollar notes issued by the Banque. The Banque eventually felt it necessary to issue a public denial that they had been providing money for the rebellion.

It is clear that Viger and his newspaper, La Minerve, were strong supporters of the Patriotes. For example, in the summer of 1837, his cousin, Bishop Lartigue of Montreal, issued an episcopal letter, condemning the drift of the Parti patriote towards radicalism. Viger in turn published an editorial in La Minerve, strongly critical of the bishop, and equating the bishop's letter to a second edition of the Governor General's critique of the Patriote movement. After La Minerve temporarily ceased publication in November 1837, two other newspapers sprang up to take its place as supporters of the Patriotes and the possibility of independence: La Quotidienne (1837 to 1838) and Le Temps (1838). Although François Lemaitre (later one of the Frères chasseurs) was the editor of both papers, Viger was suspected to own both of them.

It is also clear that when the colonial government moved to arrest leaders of the Rebellion in November 1837, Viger was in a position to alert Papineau that a warrant for his arrest was likely. Viger also gave encouraging words to Papineau:

"... the sun shone for everyone and would shine again for them and perhaps he would see the day when they would be victorious and masters of the country; ... that they must call on the supreme being to support their cause; ... that he [Viger] would not be responsible for having the streets reddened with the blood of those who were not of their political persuasion [and] were only outcasts."

Viger also assured Papineau that they could expect help from the Americans to overthrow the British, and possibly also from the Indian population.

Whatever his connections to the Rebellion in 1837, Viger initially did not come under serious scrutiny from the British authorities. His house was searched once, in November 1837, but thereafter he was left alone for a year, even after the government declared martial law in the Montreal district on December 5, 1837. However, when the Rebellion broke out a second time the next year, Viger was arrested on November 4, 1838, denounced by the Montreal Herald as the promoter of seditious newspapers. In December 1838, the superintendent of police offered him bail, but he refused, insisting instead that he be put on trial. For the first two months of his detention, he was kept in close confinement, denied pen, paper and newspapers, and not allowed exercise. He was also denied the solace of playing his flageolet, a small recorder-like instrument, which was one of his few hobbies. He was not released until May 1840, without ever standing trial.

== Province of Canada politics ==
=== Opposition to union ===
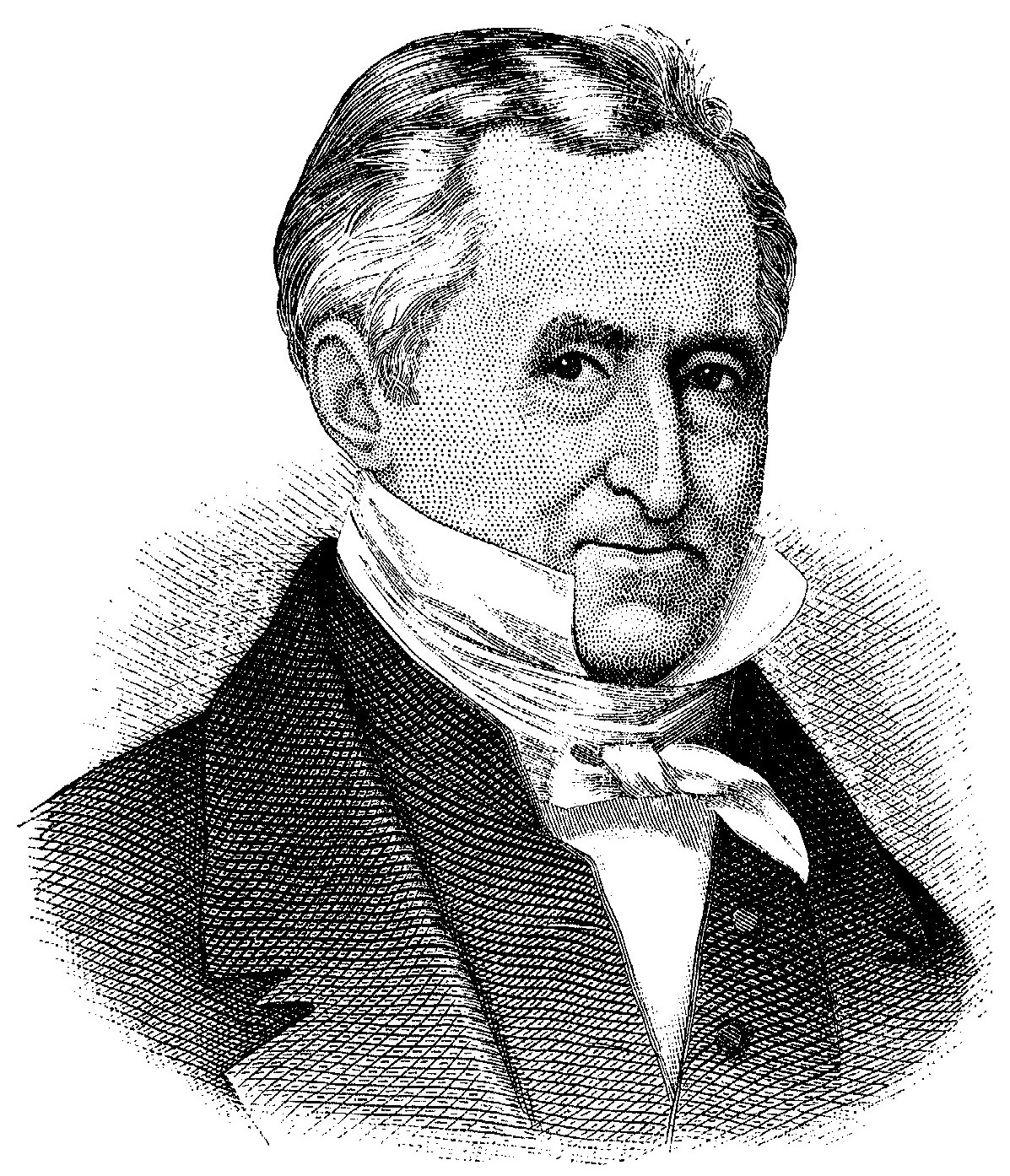
Denis-Benjamin Viger in later life

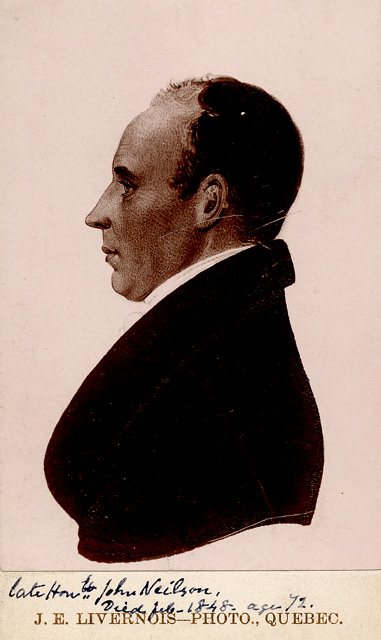
John Neilson, Viger's ally in Parliament

Following the rebellion in Lower Canada, and the similar rebellion in 1837 in Upper Canada (now Ontario), the British government decided to merge the two provinces into a single province, as recommended by Lord Durham in the Durham Report. The Union Act, 1840, passed by the British Parliament, abolished the two provinces and their separate parliaments, and created the Province of Canada, with a single Parliament for the entire province, composed of an elected Legislative Assembly and an appointed Legislative Council. The Governor General initially retained a strong position in the government.

Upon his release from prison in 1840, Viger threw himself into opposition to the proposed union, which he had opposed when it had first been suggested nearly twenty years earlier. Now in his mid-60s, a political veteran and nicknamed Le Vénérable, Viger was worried that the union proposal was designed to assimilate French-Canadians and undercut their culture. He was specifically critical of the provision that barred the use of French in the new Parliament. He also critiqued the provision that would make the new Province of Canada liable for all debts of Upper Canada and Lower Canada: Upper Canada's public debt was larger than Lower Canada's debt, but the payment of the combined debt would fall jointly on all residents of the new Province.

In the first general elections in 1841, Viger stood for election to the new Legislative Assembly. He campaigned against the union and won the riding of Richelieu, defeating a unionist candidate. He realigned with Neilson, who had broken with Papineau in the increasing radicalism leading to the Rebellion, but who shared Viger's opposition to the union. Neilson was also elected to the Assembly. The two became the leaders of the French-Canadian Group of twenty members from Lower Canada, opposed to the union. In the first session of the new Parliament, the French-Canadian Group voted against the union.

=== Responsible government and the Governor General ===
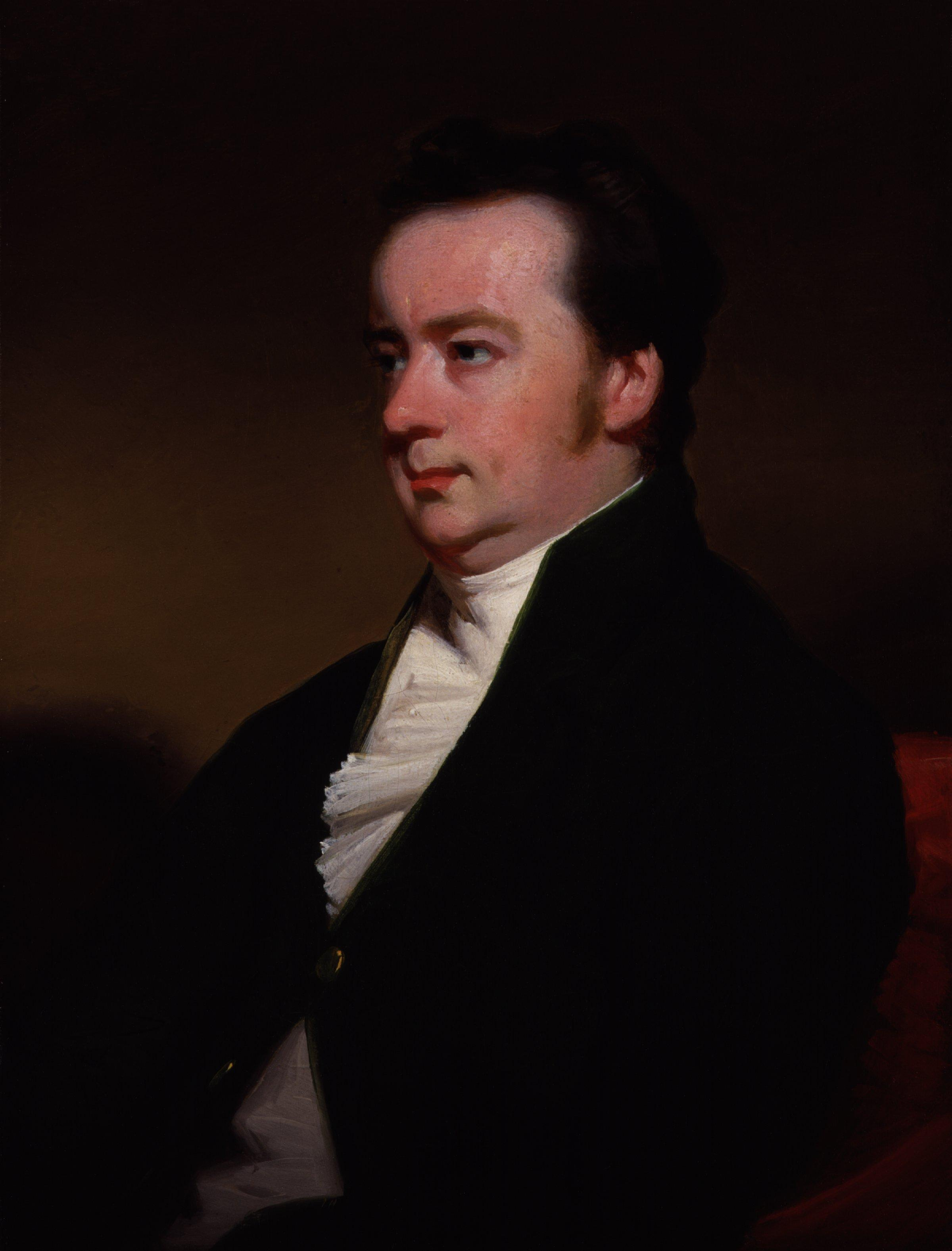
Governor General Sir Charles Metcalfe, who opposed responsible government

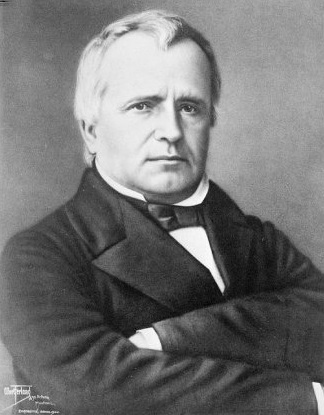
Louis-Hippolyte LaFontaine, joint premier who resigned on the issue of responsible government

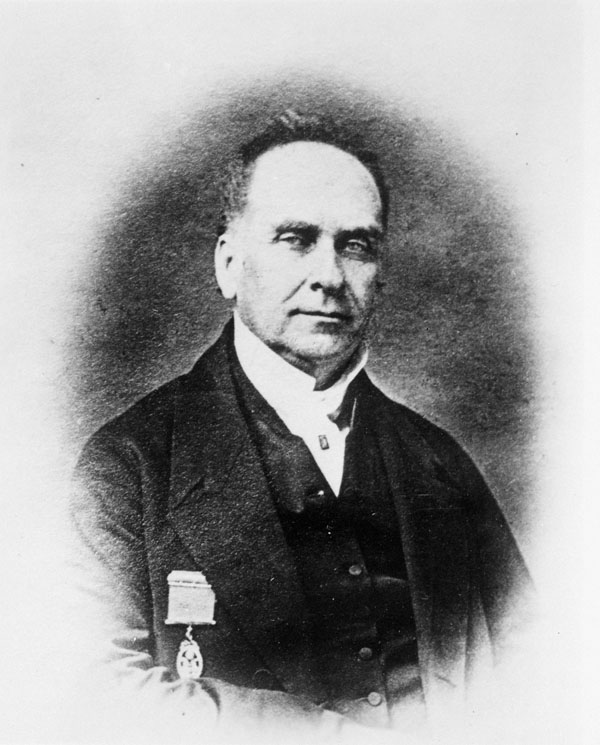
Robert Baldwin, joint premier who also resigned

Throughout the term of the first Parliament, there were running disputes over the balance of powers between the elected Legislative Assembly and the appointed Governor General. During the first session of the Parliament, the members of the French-Canadian Group, led by Viger and Neilson, were consistent opponents of Governor General Lord Sydenham, who was hostile to the concept of responsible government and took the position that as governor of a colony, he was the head of the government, simply assisted by the elected officials.

Viger cooperated with Robert Baldwin, leader of the Reformers from Canada West, in introducing a series of resolutions affirming the role of the Legislative Assembly in reviewing the actions of the executive. Although the final version was watered down by Sydenham's supporters, the resolutions were the first statement by the Assembly of the concept of responsible government. A year later, when Baldwin lost his seat in the Assembly in a ministerial by-election, Viger offered to resign his seat to allow Baldwin an opportunity to re-enter the Assembly. Ultimately, a backbench member in another seat in Canada East resigned and Baldwin was elected to represent Rimouski.

Sydenham died suddenly in 1841 and was replaced as governor general by Sir Charles Bagot, who was more conciliatory. He appointed Louis-Hippolyte LaFontaine from the French-Canadian Group, and Robert Baldwin from Canada West, to lead the Executive Council. They had substantial support in the Legislative Assembly. However, when Governor General Sir Charles Metcalfe succeeded Bagot in 1843, he asserted that while he would consult with the Executive Council, he could act independently, particularly in the appointments to government positions.

Matters came to a head in November of 1843, when the LaFontaine–Baldwin ministry resigned because of Metcalfe's refusal to consult the Executive Council on various appointments. Only one member of the Executive Council, Dominick Daly, remained in office. There was a major debate in the Legislative Assembly, which passed a motion supporting the former members of the Executive Council and criticising Metcalfe for his actions. The motion passed with a strong majority (46–23), composed of Reformers and the French-Canadian Group, but with two major exceptions: Viger and Neilson both voted in support of the Governor General. While both wanted the Assembly to have greater control, neither were convinced that the new concept of responsible government, advanced by LaFontaine and Baldwin, was workable. Neilson considered it a trick "to humbug the people".

=== Joint premier of the Province of Canada ===
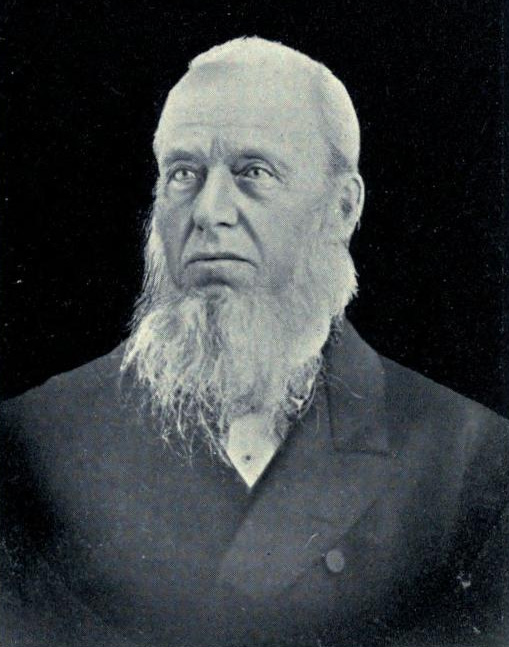
William Draper, joint premier from Canada West with Viger

Following the resignation of the LaFontaine–Baldwin ministry, Governor General Metcalfe was left with only one member in the Executive Council, the Provincial Secretary, Dominick Daly. Metcalfe tried to put together a broad-based ministry to exclude LaFontaine and Baldwin and reject the idea of responsible government. Although he canvassed several leading politicians opposed to Baldwin and LaFontaine, they could not agree on forming a ministry together. In December, Metcalfe persuaded Viger to accept office as joint premier, along with a moderate conservative Tory from Canada West, William Draper. For the next nine months, the Executive Council only had the three members. In light of the Assembly's strong political opposition to his policies, Governor General Metcalfe prorogued Parliament indefinitely. The first Parliament was never called back into session.

Viger was heavily criticised by his former party companions for taking office under a Governor General who was hostile to responsible government and French-Canadians. He was accused by some former Parti patriote colleagues of treason. He was also criticised by William Lyon Mackenzie, who had led the Upper Canada Rebellion. Political commentators at the time, and historians since, have found it difficult to understand Viger's decision to take office under Governor General Metcalfe, along with Draper, a Tory who had opposed the rebellions and strongly supported the ties with the United Kingdom. One theory is that Viger believed that ultimately the united Province of Canada would fall apart, leaving the path open for Lower Canada to become fully independent. He opposed LaFontaine's efforts to build a fully functioning alliance with Baldwin and the Reformers, because in his view that would delay the ultimate break-up. He was prepared to work with Metcalfe and Draper in the meantime. At around this time he proposed the concept of the "double majority": that the Executive Council should be composed of members who represented a majority in each section, and that bills in the Assembly would need majority support from both section to pass.

Viger and Draper appear to have envisaged building a moderate conservative ministry, but they found it difficult to attract support. LaFontaine had developed a firm grip on the leadership of the French-Canadian Group, and few considered joining the Draper–Viger ministry. Viger's only success was to attract his cousin, Denis-Benjamin Papineau (younger brother of Louis-Joseph Papineau, still in exile) to accept a position as Commissioner of Crown Lands. The appointment triggered even more Patriote criticism, this time accusing the Papineau family of betraying the French-Canadian cause.

In October, 1844, nearly a year since the last sitting of Parliament, Metcalfe called a general election. The Draper–Viger ministry, already with little support in Canada East, lost even that support. Viger was defeated in his riding of Richelieu by Wolfred Nelson, the former leader in the Rebellion, now returned from exile and supporting LaFontaine. As was permitted at that time, Viger stood for election in a second riding, Montreal County. He was also defeated there, by André Jobin. Viger remained without a seat in the Assembly until 1845, when he won a by-election in the Three Rivers riding after the death of the incumbent member. Neilson, who was not a member of the ministry but supported it, was also defeated, as were other supporters, such as Austin Cuvillier. Viger's cousin Denis-Benjamin Papineau was the only member of the ministry re-elected in Canada East.

The Draper–Viger ministry stayed in power for another year, but with narrow majorities. It was sustained by the support of the Governor General, and by Draper's majority from Canada West in the Assembly. Finally, on June 17, 1846, Viger resigned his position in the Executive Council. He was succeeded as joint premier from Canada East by his cousin, Denis-Benjamin Papineau.

Viger did not stand for election in the general elections of 1847.

=== Member of the Legislative Council ===
In 1848, Viger was appointed to the Legislative Council. Draper recommended the appointment to the new Governor General, the Earl of Elgin, to strengthen the Draper ministry in the Council. However, Viger's interest in politics was waning. His last speech in the Council was in 1849, when he opposed the controversial Rebellion Losses Bill, put forward by the new LaFontaine–Baldwin ministry. Although the purpose of the bill was to compensate individuals in Canada East who had suffered property damage during the Rebellion, he argued that it was too costly for the provincial government.

In articles written for the newspapers, Viger opposed the abolition of seigneurial tenure, a major land reform brought in by Lafontaine. Viger critiqued it as pillaging the property rights of the seigneurial class. He also wrote articles opposing the Montreal Annexation Manifesto, which proposed that the Province of Canada should be annexed by the United States.

Viger rarely appeared in the Council. In 1858, fifty years after he was first elected to the Assembly of Lower Canada, he lost his seat in the Council for failure to attend two sessions of the Parliament.

== Later life and death ==
Viger's wife died in 1854. Thereafter, he mainly kept to himself in his house in Montreal. Amédée Papineau, son of Louis-Joseph Papineau, said that Viger had the finest art collection and library in Montreal. His wine cellar was said to be one of the best in Montreal. He maintained a social life, entertaining friends and families.

Viger died in Montreal in 1861. He left most of his fortune to his younger cousin, Côme-Séraphin Cherrier, whom Viger's parents had taken in when Cherrier's mother had died. Viger left his library to the Séminaire de Saint-Hyacinthe.

His funeral was celebrated at Notre-Dame in Montreal. He is buried in Notre Dame des Neiges Cemetery.

== Legacy ==
Joseph Royal, former editor of La Minerve, eulogised Viger:

C'était l'un des derniers chefs survivants de cette glorieuse phalange de patriotes qui ont rempli du bruit de leurs paroles et de leurs actes plus d'un demi-siècle de notre histoire. Sa vie, comme celle des Bédard, des Panet, des Papineau, se trouve liée à ces luttes héroïques où l'existence de la nationalité canadienne fut tant de fois mise en jeu et fut autant de fois sauvée par ces nobles soutiens de la liberté.

Translation: He was one of the last surviving leaders of the glorious phalanx of patriots who filled more than a half-century of our history with the sounds of their words and deeds. His life, like those of the Bédards, the Panets, the Papineaus, was tied to the heroic battles where the existence of the Canadien nationality was several times in play and each time was saved by these noble supporters of liberty.

The Montreal Gazette commented shortly after Viger's death that his life could be summed up by "a desire to secure the blessings of free government for his fellow countrymen."

Viger's home is listed on the federal listing of Canada's Historic Places, and also on the Répertoire du patrimoine culturel du Québec.

The Montreal West Island Integrated University Health and Social Services Centre operates the Centre d'hébergement Denis-Benjamin-Viger, providing psychosocial, nursing, pharmaceutical, medical and rehabilitation services. It is located on Cherrier Street, L'Île-Bizard, Montreal, the same street as the Manoir Denis-Benjamin-Viger.

There is a long-term care and housing centre for retired individuals, the CHSLD Denis-Benjamin-Viger, also on Cherrier Street, Île-Bizard, Montreal.

== Works ==
- Considérations sur les effets qu'ont produit en Canada, la conservation des établissemens du pays, les moeurs, l'éducation, etc., de ses habitans [...] (Montréal, 1809)
- Analyse d'un entretien sur la conservation des établissements du Bas-Canada [...] (Montréal, 1826)
- Considérations relatives à la dernière révolution de la Belgique (Montréal, 1831)
- Observations sur la réponse de Mathieu, lord Aylmer, à la députation du Tattersall, [...] sur les affaires du Canada [...] (Montréal, 1834)
- Observations de l'hon. D.B. Viger, contre la proposition faite dans le Conseil législatif [...] de rejeter le bill de l'Assemblée, pour la nomination d'un agent de la province (Montréal, 1835)
- Mémoires relatifs à l'emprisonnement de l'honorable D.B. Viger (Montréal, 1840)
- La Crise ministérielle et Mr. Denis Benjamin Viger [...] (Kingston, 1844).

== See also ==
- 1st Parliament of the Province of Canada
- List of presidents of the Saint-Jean-Baptiste Society of Montreal

Political offices
Preceded by John Richardson; Jean-Marie Mondelet	Member of the Legislative Assembly of Lower Canada for Montreal West (two members); 1808–1810 (two elections); Serving with: William McGillivray (1808–1809); Thomas McCord (1810)	Succeeded by Archibald Norman McLeod; Étienne Nivard Saint-Dizier
Preceded by Jean-Thomas Taschereau; Bonaventure Panet	Member of the Legislative Assembly of Lower Canada for Leinster (two members); 1810–1816 (two elections); Serving with: Jacques Archambault (1810–1814); Jacques Trullier, dit Lacombe (1815); Michel Prévost (1815–1816)	Succeeded by Jacques Trullier, dit Lacombe; Benjamin Beaupré
Preceded by Noël Breux; Joseph Bresse	Member of the Legislative Assembly of Lower Canada for Kent (two members); 1816–1829 (five elections); Serving with: Pierre Bruneau (1816–1820); Frédéric-Auguste Quesnel (1820–1829)	Succeeded by Frédéric-Auguste Quesnel; Louis-Michel Viger
