= Joseph Viger =

Canadian politician

Joseph Viger (February 13, 1739 – November 17, 1803) was a businessman and political figure in Lower Canada.

He was born Joseph-René Viger in Montreal in 1739, the son of Jacques Viger, a shoemaker. He became a lumber merchant at Rivière-des-Prairies near Montreal and then at L'Assomption. He was elected to the Legislative Assembly of Lower Canada in Leinster County in 1796.

Viger died at Saint-Sulpice in 1803.

His brothers, Denis and Jacques, also served in the legislative assembly. His nephew, Jacques Viger, later became the first mayor of Montreal.
