= Denis Viger =

Canadian politician

Denis Viger (June 6, 1741 – June 16, 1805) was a carpenter, businessman, and politician in Lower Canada.

He was born in Montreal in 1741, the son of a shoemaker. He worked as a carpenter and also carved wooden objects for the church in Saint-Denis. In 1772, he married Périne-Charles, the daughter of François-Pierre Cherrier, a notary. Viger then worked for the Hôtel-Dieu in Montreal and was also involved in the sale and export of potash. In 1796, he was elected to the Legislative Assembly of Lower Canada in Montreal East as a supporter of the Parti canadien.

He died in Montreal in 1805.

His son Denis-Benjamin later played an important role in the politics of the province. His nephew, Jacques Viger, was the first mayor of Montreal, and his nephew Louis-Michel Viger became a lawyer and served in the Legislative Assembly.
