= Jacques Viger (Member of the Assembly) =

Canadian politician

Member of the Lower Canada Parliament for Kent
- In office January 24, 1797 – January 21, 1798
- Preceded by: René Boileau
- Succeeded by: Michel-Amable Berthelot Dartigny

Personal details
- Born: November 23, 1735 Montreal
- Died: January 21, 1798 (aged 62)
- Party: Parti canadien
- Spouse: Amaranthe Prévost
- Relations: Denis Viger (brother)
- Children: Jacques Viger

Jacques Viger (November 23, 1735 – January 21, 1798) was a political figure in Lower Canada.

== Biography ==
He was born in Montreal on November 23, 1735, the son of the shoemaker Jacques Viger. On May 7, 1764, he married Amaranthe Prévost, the daughter of Eustache Prévost and Marie-Madeleine Sarrault.

In 1796, Jacques Viger was elected to the 2nd Parliament of Lower Canada for Kent County (later Chambly County) as a supporter of the parti canadien. His brother Denis Viger was also elected to the legislative assembly in Montreal East. He died on January 21, 1798.

His son, Jacques Viger, was the first mayor of Montreal and his nephew Louis-Michel Viger became a lawyer and also served in the Legislative Assembly of Lower Canada. His nephew Denis-Benjamin later played an important role in the politics of the province.
