= Jacques Viger (mayor) =

First mayor of Montreal, Québec, Canada

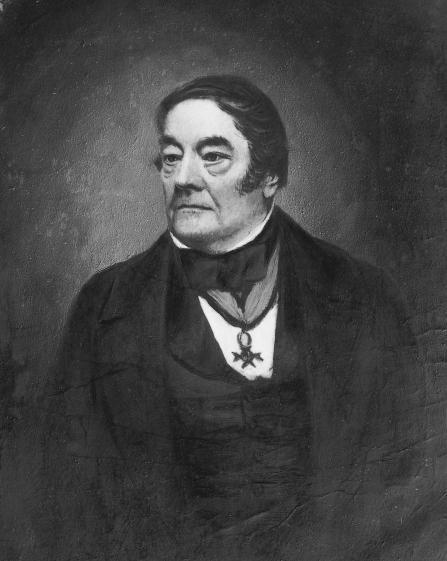

1st Mayor of Montreal
- In office June 5, 1833 – 1836
- Succeeded by: Peter McGill

Personal details
- Born: May 7, 1787 Montreal, Lower Canada
- Died: December 12, 1858 (aged 71) Montreal, Lower Canada
- Resting place: Notre-Dame-de-Grâce Church
- Spouse: Marie-Marguerite La Corne
- Relations: Louis-Joseph Papineau (cousin)
- Children: 3
- Education: Collège de Montréal
- Profession: Antiquarian, archaeologist

Jacques Viger (May 7, 1787 – December 12, 1858) was an antiquarian, archaeologist, and the first mayor of Montreal, Quebec, Canada.

== Biography ==
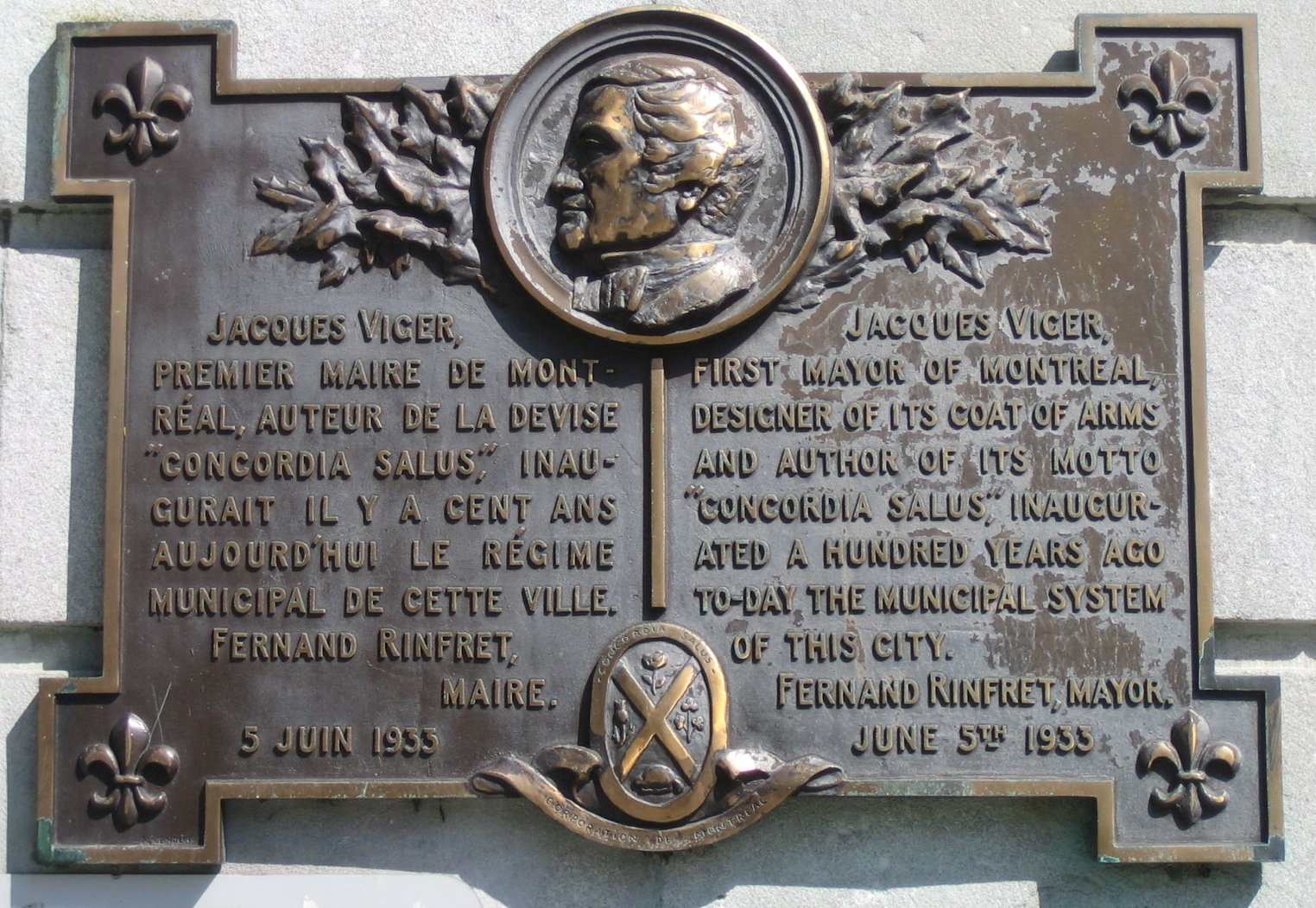
Plaque honouring Viger in Vauquelin Square

Viger was born in Montreal, the son of Jacques Viger who represented Kent in the 2nd Parliament of Lower Canada, and studied at the Sulpician college of Montreal. On November 17, 1808, he married Marie Marguerite La Corne, daughter of Luc de la Corne, and widow of Major the Hon. John Lennox. They had three children, all of whom died in infancy.

After his studies he went to Quebec, where he worked as an editor of the newspaper Le Canadien from November 1808 to May 1809. Viger served as captain in the Canadian Voltigeurs unit under Charles de Salaberry during the War of 1812. He was elected the first mayor of Montreal in 1833 and worked to improve its sanitary conditions. Although he wrote little, his reputation as an archaeologist was universal, and the greatest contemporary historians of France and the United States have drawn from his collection of manuscripts, based on forty years of research. He compiled a chronicle under the title of "Sabretache" (28 vols.), wherein he gathered plans, maps, portraits, and valuable notes illustrating many contested historical points. He was the founder of the Historical Society of Montreal in 1857, one year before his death. Pope Pius IX honoured him with the knighthood of the Order of St. Gregory the Great.

He died December 12, 1858, at age 71, and was buried in the crypt of the Notre-Dame-de-Grâce Church on December 15.

== Honours ==
The Viger Square and Jacques Viger Building in Montreal are named in his honour.

== See also ==
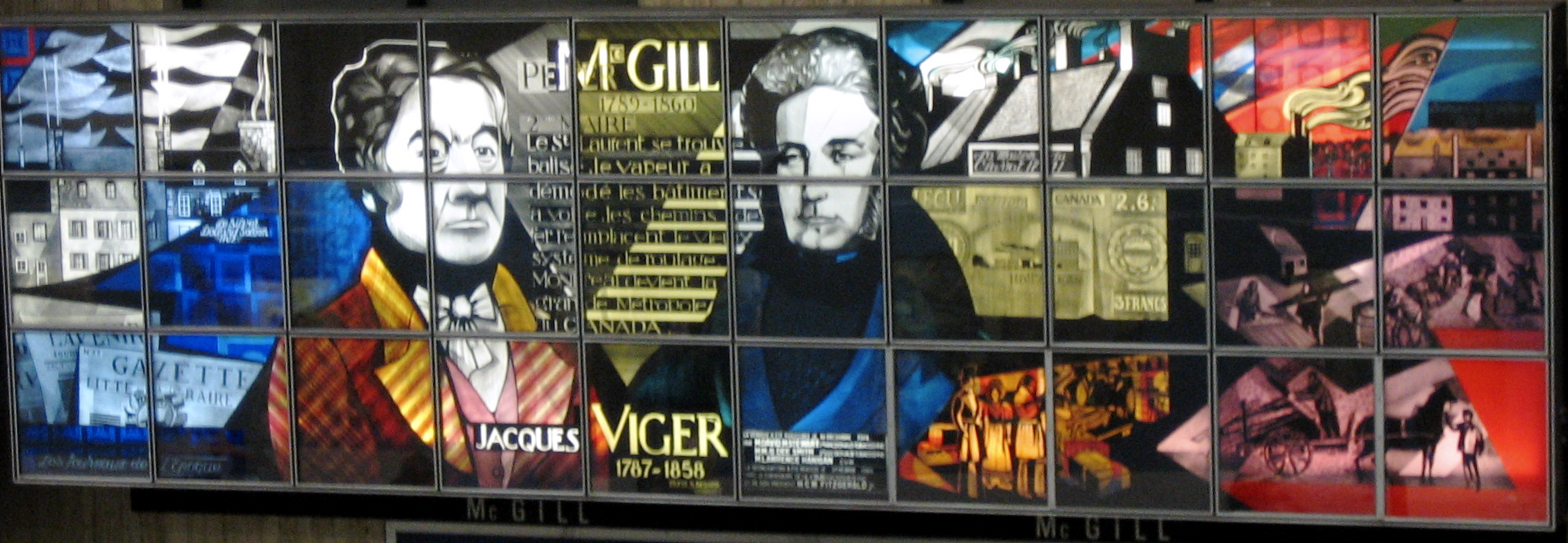
Jacques Viger's image in stained glass in the McGill Station of the Montreal Metro, next to the image of his successor as mayor, Peter McGill.

- List of presidents of the Saint-Jean-Baptiste Society of Montreal
- List of mayors of Montreal
