= Cherrier =

Cherrier is the French surname of the following persons:

- Beatrice Cherrier, French historian of economics
- Côme-Séraphin Cherrier (Lower Canada politician) (1798–1885), a member of the Legislative Assembly of Lower Canada
- Côme-Séraphin Cherrier (Quebec politician) (1848–1912), a member of the Legislative Assembly of Quebec
- François-Pierre Cherrier (1717–1793), a French-born merchant and notary in Lower Canada.
- Lionel Cherrier (born 1929), a New Caledonian politician.
- Séraphin Cherrier (1762–1843), a merchant and political figure in Lower Canada

== See also ==
- Cherrier Lake, Quebec, Canada
