= André-Benjamin Papineau =

Canadian politician

André-Benjamin Papineau (December 23, 1809 – February 1, 1890) was a notary and political figure in Lower Canada. He represented Terrebonne in the Legislative Assembly of Lower Canada from 1837 until the suspension of the constitution in 1838.

He was born in Montreal, the son of André Papineau and Marie-Anne Roussel, was educated at the Petit Séminaire de Montréal and received his commission as notary in 1835. Papineau was elected to the assembly in an 1837 by-election held following the death of Séraphin Bouc. He took part in several Patriote assemblies and was a leading member of the Fils de la Liberté. Papineau participated in the Battle of Saint-Eustache and afterwards went into hiding for a short time before turning himself into the authorities. He was imprisoned in Montreal in December 1837 and released in July of the following year. Papineau settled at Saint-Martin on Île Jésus, where he returned to practising as a notary. In 1843, he married Hermine-Eugénie Provencher. He died in Saint-Martin at the age of 80.

His uncle Joseph Papineau and his cousins Denis-Benjamin Papineau and Louis-Joseph Papineau were prominent politicians in Lower Canada. His sister Eugénie married Thomas Boutillier.
