= François-Pierre Cherrier =

François-Pierre Cherrier (September 3, 1717 – July 21, 1793) was a French-born merchant and notary in Lower Canada.

He was born in Savigné-l'Évêque in Sarthe, the son of François Cherrier and Périnne Isambart, and came to Saint-Antoine-de-Longueuil in New France, where his uncle was parish priest, in 1736. Cherrier opened a store there and became notary for the seigneury in 1738. He married Marie Dubuc in 1743. In 1750, Cherrier was named royal notary for the parish of Longueuil. After the conquest of New France by the British, Cherrier's commission as a notary was renewed but his finances suffered as the result of the conversion of the currency. In 1765, he moved to Montreal in the hope of better prospects but returned to Longueuil two years later. In 1770, he moved to Saint-Denis where his son François was parish priest. Cherrier continued to practise as a notary there until 1789 and died in Saint-Denis at the age of 75.

His sons Benjamin-Hyacinthe-Martin and Séraphin and his grandson Côme-Séraphin served in the Legislative Assembly of Lower Canada.

His daughter Rosalie married Joseph Papineau, also a member of the Assembly. Her son, Louis-Joseph Papineau, was the leader of the Parti patriote in the Legislative Assembly and a major participant in the events leading up to the Lower Canada Rebellions of 1837–1838. Her second son, Denis-Benjamin Papineau, was also active in the Patriote movement. After the reunification of Lower Canada with Upper Canada in 1841, he became joint premier of the new Province of Canada from 1846 to 1848.

Another daughter, Périne-Charles, married Denis Viger and was the mother of Denis-Benjamin Viger, who was also active in the Patriote movement. He also became co-premier of the Province of Canada, from 1843 to 1846.
