= André Papineau =

Canadian politician

André Papineau (March 5, 1765 – June 22, 1832) was a cooper and political figure in Lower Canada. He represented Effingham in the Legislative Assembly of Lower Canada from 1827 to 1830.

He was born in Montreal, the son of Joseph Papineau and Marie-Josephte Beaudry, and settled at Saint-Martin. In 1797, Papineau married Marie-Anne Roussel. He served as a lieutenant in the militia during the War of 1812. Papineau was named a census commissioner for Effingham County in 1825. He did not run for reelection to the assembly in 1830. Papineau died in Saint-Martin at the age of 67.

His brother Joseph and his son André-Benjamin Papineau also served in the assembly. His nephews Louis-Joseph Papineau and Denis-Benjamin Papineau were prominent politicians in Canada East. His daughter Eugénie married Thomas Boutillier, another prominent politician.
