= Ottawa County (Province of Canada electoral district) =

Electoral district in former Province of Canada

Province of Canada electoral district

Defunct pre-Confederation electoral district
- Legislature: Legislative Assembly of the Province of Canada
- District created: 1841
- District abolished: 1867
- First contested: 1841
- Last contested: 1863

Ottawa County was an electoral district of the Legislative Assembly of the Parliament of the Province of Canada. It was located in Canada East (now Quebec), in the Outaouais region, on the north bank of the Ottawa River. It was created in 1841 and was based on the previous electoral district of the same name for the Legislative Assembly of Lower Canada. It was represented by one member of the Legislative Assembly.

In 1853, the provincial Parliament redrew the electoral map. The boundaries for Ottawa County were altered to some extent in the new map, which came into force for the 1854 general elections.

The electoral district was abolished in 1867, upon the creation of Canada and the province of Quebec.

== Boundaries ==
=== 1841 to 1854 ===
The Union Act, 1840, passed by the British Parliament, merged the two provinces of Lower Canada and Upper Canada into the Province of Canada, with a single Parliament. The separate parliaments of Lower Canada and Upper Canada were abolished.

The Ottawa County electoral district was located in the Outaouais region in the western part of Canada East (now Quebec). The Ottawa River formed the southern boundary of the electoral district, and also the boundary with Canada West.

The Union Act provided that the pre-existing electoral boundaries of Lower Canada and Upper Canada would continue to be used in the new Parliament, unless altered by the Union Act itself. The Ottawa County electoral district of Lower Canada was not altered by the Act, and therefore continued with the same boundaries which had been set by a statute of Lower Canada in 1829:

The County of Ottawa shall be bounded on the south east by the south easterly boundary line of the Seigniory of La Petite Nation, running northward along the said boundary line, from the Ottawa River, to the depth of the said Seigniory, and thence the same course continued to the northern boundary of the Province, on the west by the northerly and westerly bounds and limits of the Province, and on the south west by the Grand or Ottawa River, in its whole extent to the Lake Temiscaming, and from the head of the said Lake, by a line due north to the boundary line of the Hudson Bay Territory, and shall include all the Islands in the said Grand or Ottawa River, and in the Lake Temiscaming, nearest to the said County, and in the whole or in part fronting the same; which County so bounded, comprises the seigniory of La Petite Nation, and the following Townships, situate on the Grand or Ottawa River, that is to say, Lochaber, and its augmentation, Buckingham, Templeton, Hull, Eardly, Onslow and all the Townships in the said limits, on the north of the said Grand or Ottawa River.

=== 1854 to 1867 ===
In 1853, the Parliament of the Province of Canada passed a new electoral map. The boundaries of Ottawa County were altered to some extent by the new map, which came into force in the general elections of 1854:

The County of Ottawa shall be bounded on the east by the County of Argenteuil, on the north-east by the northern portion of the County of Montcalm, on the south-east by the Grand or Ottawa River comprising all Islands in the same opposite to the County and belonging to Lower Canada, on the south-west by the south-western limits of the Township of Eardly prolonged to the County of Montcalm; the said County so bounded comprising the Seigniory of La Petite Nation, the Townships of Lochaber and its augmentation, Buckingham, Hull, Eardley, Masham, Wakefield, Portland, Derry, Rippon, Denholm, Low, Aylwin, Hincks, Bowman, Villeneuve, Lathbury, Hartwell, Suffolk, Ponsonby, Amherst, Addington, Preston, Bidwell, Wells, Bigelow, Wright, Northfield, Blake, McGill, Killaly, Dudley, Chabot, Bouchette, Cameron, Maniwaky, Kensington, Egan, Aumond, Bouthillier, Kiamica, Merritt and Campbell.

== Members of the Legislative Assembly (1841–1867) ==
Ottawa County was a single-member constituency in the Legislative Assembly.

The following were the members of the Legislative Assembly from Ottawa County. The party affiliations are based on the biographies of individual members given by the National Assembly of Quebec, as well as votes in the Legislative Assembly. "Party" was a fluid concept, especially during the early years of the Province of Canada.

Parliament	Members	Years in Office	Party
1st Parliament; 1841–1844	Charles Dewey Day (Note: Seat vacated on appointment to the Bench, June 21, 1842: Côté, Appointments and Elections, p. 59, note (29).)	1841–1842	Unionist and Government Tory
1st Parliament; 1841–1844	Denis-Benjamin Papineau (Note: Elected in by-election, August 17, 1842. Seat vacated on being appointed Commissioner of Crown lands, an office of profit under the Crown, September 3, 1844: Côté, Appointments and Elections, p. 59, note (30).)	1842–1844 (by-election)	French-Canadian Group
2nd Parliament; 1844–1847	Denis-Benjamin Papineau	1844–1847	"British" Tory
3rd Parliament; 1848–1851	John Egan	1848–1854	"English" Liberal (1848); Moderate independent (1849–1851)
4th Parliament; 1851–1854	John Egan	1848–1854	"English" moderate
5th Parliament; 1854–1857	Alanson Cooke	1854–1857	Rouge
6th Parliament; 1858–1861	Denis-Émery Papineau	1858–1861	Rouge
7th Parliament; 1861–1863	William McDonell Dawson	1861–1863	Conservative
8th Parliament; 1863––1867	Alonzo Wright	1863–1867	Confederation; Conservative

== Abolition ==
The district was abolished on July 1, 1867, when the British North America Act, 1867 came into force, splitting the Province of Canada into Quebec and Ontario. It was succeeded by electoral districts of the same name in the House of Commons of Canada and the Legislative Assembly of Quebec.

== See also ==
- List of elections in the Province of Canada
