= Benjamin-Hyacinthe-Martin Cherrier =

Canadian politician

Benjamin-Hyacinthe-Martin Cherrier (November 11, 1757 – December 15, 1836) was a surveyor and political figure in Lower Canada.

He was born Benjamin-Hyacinthe Cherrier at Longueuil in 1757, the son of François-Pierre Cherrier, and studied at the Collège Saint-Raphaël. He settled at Saint-Denis on the Richelieu River, where he set up his practice as a surveyor. He was elected to the 1st Parliament of Lower Canada for Richelieu in 1792 and was reelected in 1796. Cherrier died at Saint-Denis in 1836.

His brother Séraphin practiced medicine and also served in the legislative assembly. His nephew, Côme-Séraphin Cherrier, became a lawyer and served in the legislative assembly. His sister Rosalie married notary Joseph Papineau, also a member of the assembly, and was the mother of Louis-Joseph Papineau. Another sister, Périne-Charles, married Denis Viger and was the mother of Denis-Benjamin Viger. His daughter Marguerite married Léonard Godefroy de Tonnancour.
