= Thomas Boutillier =

Lower Canada doctor, Patriote, and politician

Member of the Legislative Assembly of Lower Canada for Saint-Hyacinthe county (two-member constituency)
- In office 1834–1838 Serving with Louis Raynaud, dit Blanchard
- Preceded by: Louis Poulin
- Succeeded by: None; constitution suspended

Member of the Legislative Assembly of the Province of Canada for Saint Hyacinthe (three elections)
- In office 1841–1851
- Preceded by: New position
- Succeeded by: Louis-Victor Sicotte

Personal details
- Born: October 9, 1797 Quebec, Lower Canada
- Died: December 8, 1861 (aged 64) Saint-Hyacinthe, Canada East, Province of Canada
- Party: Lower Canada: Parti patriote Province of Canada: French-Canadian Group
- Spouse: Eugénie Papineau
- Relations: André Papineau (father-in-law); Louis-Joseph Papineau (cousin by marriage); Denis-Benjamin Papineau (cousin by marriage)
- Children: 1 daughter
- Profession: Physician

Military service
- Allegiance: Patriotes
- Branch/service: Patriote militia
- Years of service: 1837
- Battles/wars: Battle of Saint-Charles

Thomas Boutillier (October 9, 1797 – December 8, 1861) was a medical doctor, Patriote, and politician in Lower Canada. Elected to the Legislative Assembly of Lower Canada in 1834, he was a member of the Parti patriote led by Louis-Joseph Papineau, which was challenging the British colonial government of the largely French-speaking province of Lower Canada. When the Lower Canada Rebellion broke out in 1837, he fought on the Patriote side in the Battle of Saint-Charles. Following the Patriotes' defeat, he fled to the United States. He returned to Lower Canada in 1838.

When the Province of Canada was created three years later, in 1841, he was elected to the new Parliament of the Province of Canada. His views had moderated and he now followed Louis-Hippolyte LaFontaine, who was working to achieve responsible government in partnership with Robert Baldwin, the leader of Reformers from Upper Canada. Boutillier served three terms in the Legislative Assembly before retiring in 1851.

== Early life ==
Boutillier was born in Quebec City in 1797, the son of Guillaume Boutillier and Anne-Françoise Normand. His father had held the position of Gentleman Usher of the Black Rod in the Legislative Council of Lower Canada. Boutillier studied at the Séminaire de Saint-Hyacinthe, and then at the University of Philadelphia. He was licensed to practise medicine in 1817 and settled at Saint-Hyacinthe. In 1826, he married Eugénie Papineau, the daughter of André Papineau, a member of the Lower Canada assembly, and a cousin of Louis-Joseph Papineau and Denis-Benjamin Papineau. She died in 1830. The couple had one daughter.

== Lower Canada politics and the Rebellion ==
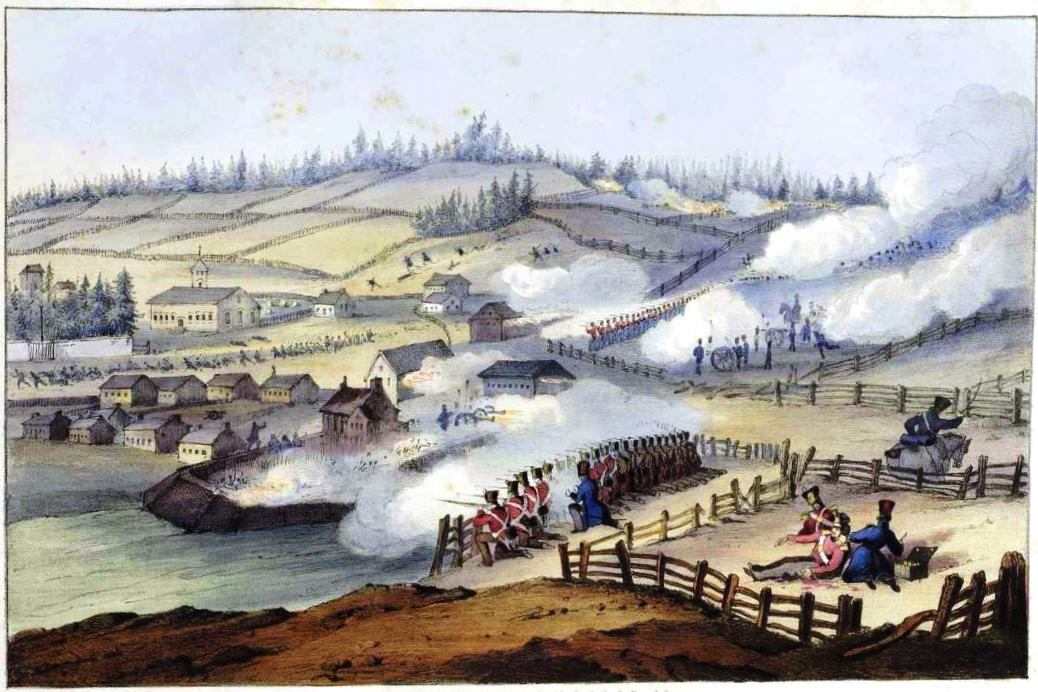
The Battle of Saint-Charles, where Boutillier led a group of 100 men on the Patriote side

In 1832, Boutillier stood for election to the Legislative Assembly of Lower Canada in a by-election in the riding of Saint-Hyacinthe, but was defeated. Two years later, he was elected in the general elections. The political situation in Lower Canada was very tense. The Parti patriote, led Louis-Joseph Papineau, was becoming increasingly radical in reaction to the oligarchic government of the Governor-General, appointed by the British government. Boutillier joined the radical wing of the Parti patriote. In 1836, he was part of a delegation from Saint-Hyacinth which presented a petition to Governor General Lord Gosford and discussed the political situation. They advised Gosford that they favoured peace and order, but if their Patriote colleagues in Montreal were attacked, they would spring to their help.

In 1837, the Lower Canada Rebellion broke out, with armed encounters. The provincial government was able to call on British troops and local militia, against self-armed Patriote units. The Battle of Saint-Charles occurred on November 25, 1837, at the town of Saint-Charles in the valley of the Richelieu River. Boutillier commanded a group of one hundred men at the battle, which the Patriotes lost. Boutillier fled to the United States, as did Papineau. While there, they took part in a meeting of several Patriotes at Middlebury, Vermont, on January 2, 1838, to discuss their future course. Some of the participants, particularly Robert Nelson, favoured issuing a declaration of independence modelled on the American example. Papineau objected, because the proposal included the abolition of the seigneurial system, customary law, and tithes. Papineau came under criticism for his refusal to endorse the proposal, which split the Patriote movement, but Boutillier later came to his defence. In June 1838, Boutillier stated that Papineau "has made mistakes, but he is not a traitor to his country."

By the summer of 1838, Boutillier had returned to Saint-Hyacinthe and resumed his practice. The British authorities placed him under surveillance when the Rebellion broke out again in November 1838, but he was not arrested. He had softened his political views.

== Province of Canada ==
=== First Parliament, 1841–1843 ===
Following the rebellion in Lower Canada, and the similar rebellion in 1837 in Upper Canada (now Ontario), the British government decided to merge the two provinces into a single province, as recommended by Lord Durham in the Durham Report. The Union Act, 1840, passed by the British Parliament, abolished the two provinces and their separate parliaments, and created the Province of Canada, with a single Parliament for the entire province, composed of an elected Legislative Assembly and an appointed Legislative Council. The Governor General initially retained a strong position in the government.

Boutillier opposed the union, and in 1841 was elected by acclamation to represent Saint Hyacinthe in the new Legislative Assembly. He was one of the members of the French-Canadian Group, an informal group of members from Canada East. As part of that group, he voted against the union. In the first session of the Assembly, he was a consistent opponent of Governor General Lord Sydenham.

Boutillier's political views had evolved. He was now a supporter of Louis-Hippolyte LaFontaine, a former supporter of Papineau who now took a more moderate approach. LaFontaine was convinced that the union could be used to form an alliance of reformers from Lower Canada and Upper Canada to achieve responsible government, where the Executive Council was drawn from the group with a majority in the Assembly. LaFontaine had some initial success with this approach, working with Robert Baldwin, the leader of the Upper Canada Reformers. Boutillier was a steady supporter for LaFontaine in his efforts to achieve responsible government.

=== Second Parliament, 1844–1848 ===
Boutillier again stood for election in 1844. This time he had an opponent: Louis-Antoine Dessaulles, from a seigneurial family in the Saint-Hyacinth area, and a supporter of Papineau. In 1843, LaFontaine and Baldwin, and almost all the Executive Council, had resigned their positions in the Council over a dispute with the Governor General over government appointments. The dispute caused a rupture in the French-Canadian Group. Denis-Benjamin Viger, a veteran of the Parti patriote and colleague of Papineau, was appointed to the Executive Council. In the 1844 election, Boutillier continued to support LaFontaine, while Dessaules supported Viger. Boutillier won a close-fought election and was returned to the Assembly. An election petition challenging his election was dismissed. Throughout the second Parliament, the Reformers and French-Canadian Group were in opposition, with Boutillier a consistent supporter of LaFontaine.

In 1845, Papineau returned from his exile. On a visit to some of his relatives in the Saint-Hyacinthe area, he met with Boutillier, who was anxious to repair relations between Papineau and LaFontaine. Boutillier even offered to resign his seat in the Assembly, to give Papineau the opportunity to return to electoral politics. Papineau declined the offer. Disappointed, Boutillier reported the discussion in a letter to LaFontaine: "I believe that M. Papineau does not wish to return immediately to public life."

=== Third Parliament, 1848–1851 ===
Boutillier stood for re-election in the 1847 general elections. He again had an opponent, Louis-Victor Sicotte. Boutillier was re-elected, with strong support from his hometown of Saint-Hyacinth. This time, the reformers of both Canada East and Canada West formed a clear majority in the Assembly. The new Governor General, the Earl of Elgin, called on LaFontaine and Baldwin to form the government, under the principle of responsible government.

In 1849, the LaFontaine-Baldwin ministry introduced the highly controversial Rebellion Losses Bill to compensate residents of Lower Canada who had lost property during the Rebellion. Boutillier, along with most of the government supporters, voted for the bill. Elgin then granted royal assent, firmly establishing the principle of responsible government, even though opponents of the Bill rioted and burnt the Parliament buildings.

Another political issue in 1849 was the question of annexation to the United States. The British government had ended tariffs which gave imperial preference to the colonies in British North America. The repeal had a significant impact on the economy of the Province of Canada. As well, Papineau was now strongly supporting annexation, as a republican option. Supporters of annexation issued the Montreal Annexation Manifesto. Dessaules, Boutillier's opponent in the 1844 election, supported annexation. Boutillier opposed the proposal and signed a counter-manifesto affirming loyalty to Great Britain.

In 1849 and 1850, Boutillier worked in the Assembly to have a statute passed to incorporate Saint-Hyacinthe as a town. Here again, he and Dessaules clashed, this time over the issue of the boundaries and tax structure for the town. Dessaules lobbied for a more expansive tax base than Boutillier wished. Boutillier achieved his goal in the resulting statute, but in subsequent municipal elections, he was defeated and Dessaules was elected.

== Later life and death ==
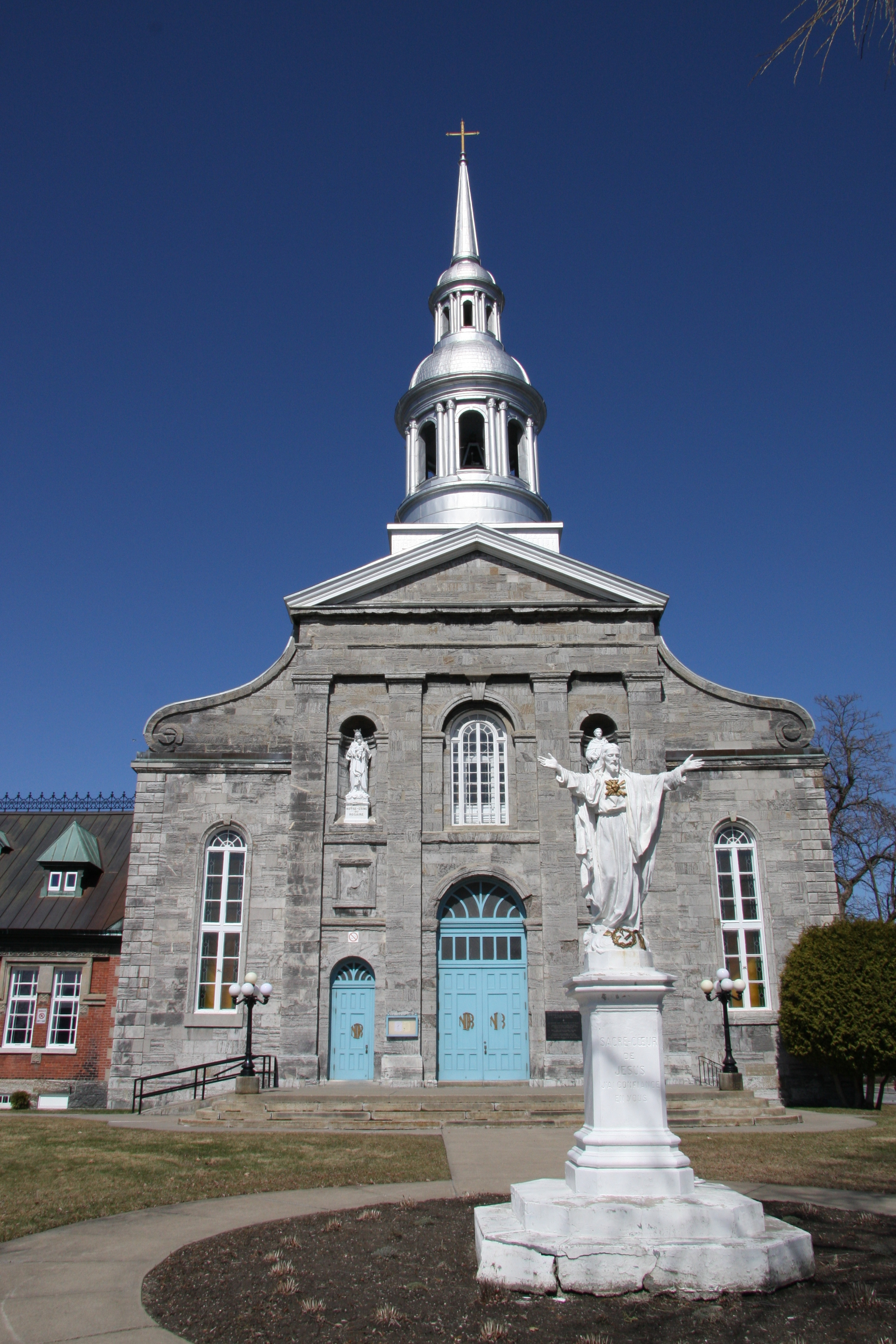
Notre-Dame-du-Rosaire, Saint-Hyacinthe, where Boutillier's funeral was held

Boutillier did not stand for election in the general elections of 1851, ending his political career. Louis-Victor Sicotte, whom Boutillier had defeated in 1848, was elected in his place.

In 1853, Boutillier was one of the founders of the local newspaper, the Courrier de Saint-Hyacinthe, which is still in operation in 2023, the longest-running French newspaper in North America.

In 1854, Boutillier was named inspector of land offices for Lower Canada. As part of his duties, in 1855 he published a report on the causes of French-Canadian immigration to the United States.

He died at Saint-Hyacinthe in 1861, and was buried from the parish church, Notre-Dame-du-Rosaire.

== Works ==
- Rapport des travaux de colonisation de l'année 1855 (Toronto: 1855)

== See also ==
- 1st Parliament of the Province of Canada
- 2nd Parliament of the Province of Canada
- 3rd Parliament of the Province of Canada
