= Commissioner of Crown Lands =

Commissioner of Crown Lands may refer to:

- Commissioners of Crown Lands (United Kingdom)
- Commissioner of Crown Lands (Australia)
  - Minister for Lands (Western Australia)
- Commissioners of Crown Lands (Province of Canada)
- Commissioners of Crown Lands (Ontario)
