= Terrebonne (Province of Canada electoral district) =

Electoral district in former Province of Canada

Terrebonne Canada East
Province of Canada electoral district

Defunct pre-Confederation electoral district
- Legislature: Legislative Assembly of the Province of Canada
- District created: 1841
- District abolished: 1867
- First contested: 1841
- Last contested: 1863

Terrebonne was an electoral district of the Legislative Assembly of the Parliament of the Province of Canada, in Canada East. It was centred on the town of Terrebonne, immediately north-west of Montreal. It was created in 1841, based on the previous electoral district of the same name for the Legislative Assembly of Lower Canada.

Terrebonne was represented by one member in the Legislative Assembly. It was abolished in 1867, upon the creation of Canada and the province of Quebec.

== Boundaries ==
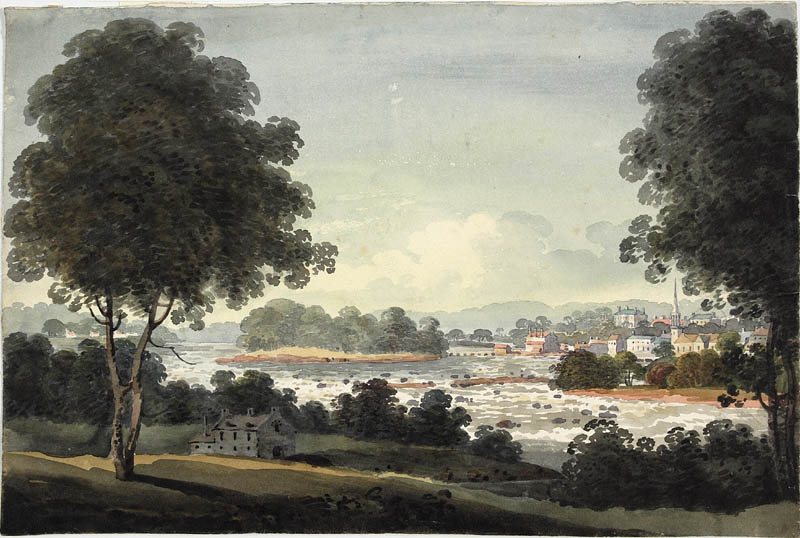
Terrebonne in 1810

Terrebonne electoral district was located to the north-west of Montreal (now included in the city of Terrebonne).

The Union Act, 1840 merged the two provinces of Upper Canada and Lower Canada into the Province of Canada, with a single Parliament. The separate parliaments of Lower Canada and Upper Canada were abolished. The Union Act provided that the pre-existing electoral boundaries of Lower Canada and Upper Canada would continue to be used in the new Parliament, unless altered by the Union Act itself.

The Lower Canada electoral district of Terrebonne was not altered by the Act, and therefore continued with the same boundaries in the new Parliament. Those boundaries had been set by a statute of Lower Canada in 1829:

The County of Terrebonne shall be bounded on the north east by the south west boundary line of the Seigniory of Lachenaie to the depth thereof, thence westward along the rear boundary line thereof, thence westward along the rear boundary line of the augmentation of Terrebonne to the south west boundary of the Township of Kilkenny, thence along the said boundary north westerly to the depth thereof, and thence on the same course to the northern boundary of the Province, on the south west by the said County of the Two Mountains, on the north west by the northern boundary of the Province, and on the south east by that part of the River Ottawa commonly called Rivière des Prairies, together with the Island and Seigniory of Isle Jesus, and all the Islands in the said River, nearest to the said County and in whole or in part, fronting the same; which County so bounded comprehends the Seigniories of Isle Jesus, Terrebonne, Des Plaines, augmentation of Terrebonne, Blainville, part of Mille Isles and its augmentation, and the Township of Abercrombie.

== Members of the Legislative Assembly (1841–1867) ==
Terrebonne was a single-member constituency.

The following were the members of the Legislative Assembly for Terrebonne. The party affiliations are based on the biographies of individual members given by the National Assembly of Quebec, as well as votes in the Legislative Assembly. "Party" was a fluid concept, especially during the early years of the Province of Canada.

Parliament	Members	Years in Office	Party
1st Parliament; 1841–1844	Michael McCulloch (Note: McCulloch was elected by acclamation after LaFontaine withdrew from the poll due to intimidation and threats of physical violence by McCulloch’s supporters: Careless, The Union of the Canadas, pp. 43–44.)	1841–1844	Unionist; "British" Tory
2nd Parliament; 1844–1847	Louis-Hippolyte LaFontaine	1844–1847	French-Canadian Group
3rd Parliament; 1848–1851	Louis-Hippolyte LaFontaine (Note: LaFontaine stood for election in both Terrebonne and Montreal, as was permitted under the election law at that time. He was elected in both seats and chose to sit in the Montreal seat, declining the Terrebonne seat, March 10, 1848: Côté, Political Appointments and Elections, p. 61, note (120).)	Declined seat	French-Canadian Group
3rd Parliament; 1848–1851	Louis-Michel Viger (Note: Elected in by-election, April 14, 1848: Côté, Political Appointments and Elections, p. 61, note (121).)	1848–1851 (by-election)	French-Canadian Group
4th Parliament; 1851–1854	Augustin-Norbert Morin	1851–1854	Ministerialist
5th Parliament; 1854–1857	Gédéon-Mélasippe Prévost (Note: Resigned seat May 29, 1857: Côté, Political Appointments and Elections, p. 63, note (197).)	1854–1857	Rouge
5th Parliament; 1854–1857	Louis-Siméon Morin (Note: Elected in by-election, June 23, 1857: Côté, Political Appointments and Elections, p. 63, note (198).)	1857 (by-election)	Bleu
6th Parliament; 1858–1861	Louis-Siméon Morin	1858–1861	Bleu
7th Parliament; 1861–1863	Louis Labrèche-Viger	1861–1867	Rouge
8th Parliament; 1863–1867	Louis Labrèche-Viger	1861–1867	Anti-Confederation; Rouge

== The 1841 election in Terrebonne ==
The first general election in 1841 was marked by considerable threats of violence and intimidation by supporters of one of the candidates, Michael McCulloch. McCulloch was a supporter of the Governor General, Lord Sydenham, who was trying to ensure that as many English-speaking members were elected from Canada East, part of the British government's policy of assimilation of French-Canadians. The reform candidate was Louis-Hippolyte LaFontaine, who was campaigning on a policy of a reform alliance between Canada East and Canada West, to achieve popular control of the government by means of responsible government. LaFontaine's "Address to the Electors of Terrebonne" set out his platform of constitutional changes and other reforms.

Terrebonne had a French-Canadian majority, but the riding was targeted by Sydenham and McCulloch's supporters as a constituency that could return an English-speaking supporter of the union. One of the English-language newspapers made this point expressly in the run-up to the election:

From the known character of the majority of the electors in Terrebonne, we doubt not that LaFontaine would be returned if all the voters were polled; but it must be the duty of the loyalists to muster in their strength and keep the poll!"

At this time, it was not unknown for the supporters of a candidate to try to take control of the poll and prevent the supporters of the other candidates from voting.

The single poll was intentionally located in New Glasgow, one of the few towns in the constituency that had an English-speaking majority. Lafontaine led his supporters in a march to New Glasgow, which was distant from the centre of the constituency. Many of his group were armed with clubs and pitchforks, which was not uncommon in the elections. As they approached the poll, they encountered a group of six or seven hundred supporters of McCulloch, most armed with clubs, some with firearms. Many of them had been brought in from other parts of the province. Sporadic fighting began to break out, with blood-stains appearing on the snow. The danger of violence and risks to personal safety of his supporters was so great that LaFontaine was forced to withdraw his candidacy to avoid major bloodshed. As the sole candidate with voters at the poll, McCulloch was elected.

Robert Baldwin, one of the leaders of the reform movement in Canada West, proposed that Lafontaine then stand for election in a by-election in an electoral district in Canada West, York 4th. Lafontaine did so and was elected as a member from Canada West. Baldwin's proposal was one of the starting points for the alliance between Baldwin and Lafontaine, which ultimately led to the establishment of responsible government in the Province of Canada in 1849.

== Abolition ==
The district was abolished on July 1, 1867, when the British North America Act, 1867 came into force, creating Canada and splitting the Province of Canada into Quebec and Ontario. It was succeeded by electoral districts of the same name in the House of Commons of Canada and the Legislative Assembly of Quebec.

== See also ==
- List of elections in the Province of Canada
