= Dalnavert =

Dalnavert Museum Macdonald House
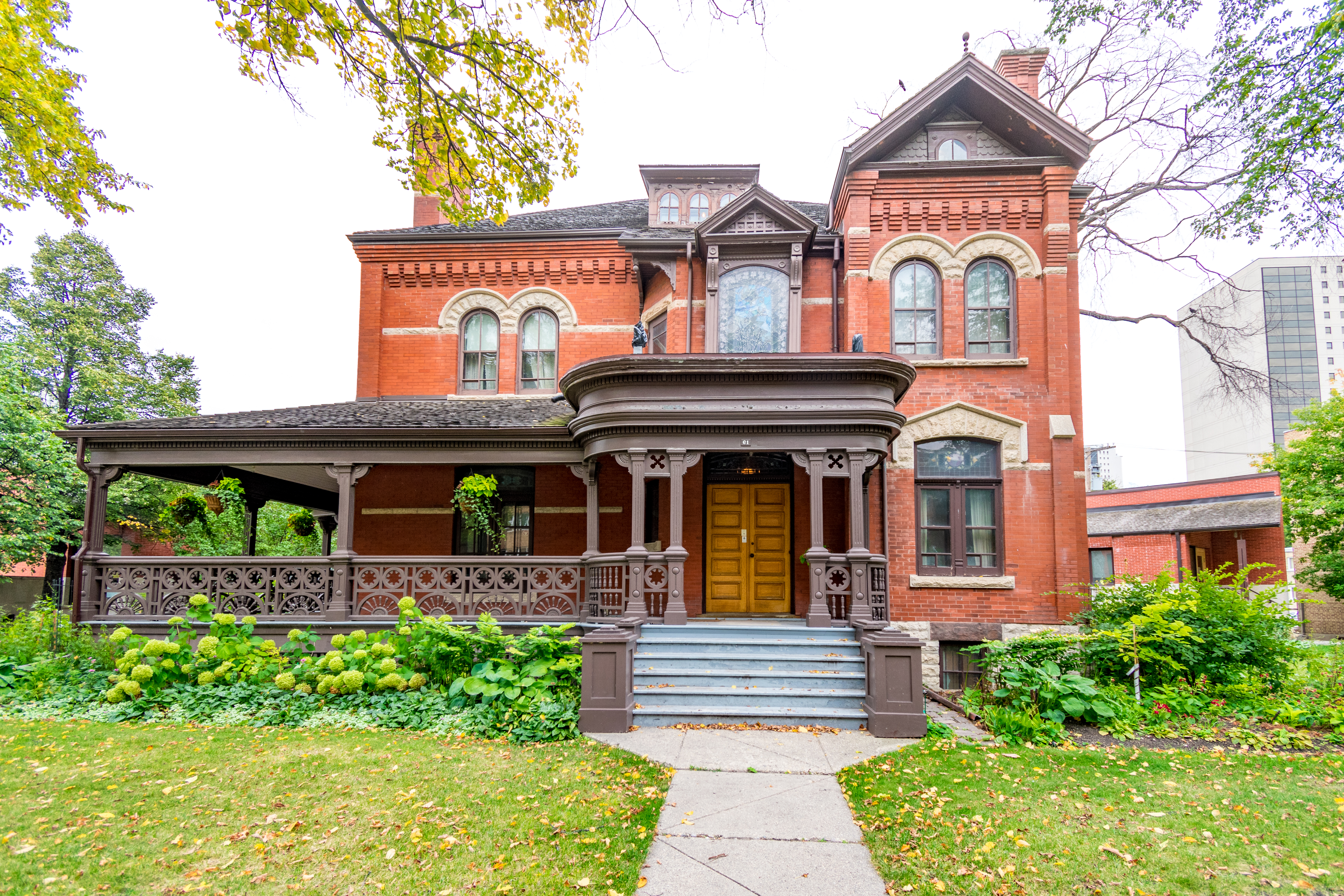
- Location: 61 Carlton Street, Winnipeg, Manitoba, Canada
- Coordinates: 49.885963°N 97.14188°W
- Type: Historic house museum
- Website: dalnavertmuseum.ca

National Historic Site of Canada
- Official name: Dalnavert National Historic Site of Canada
- Designated: 1990

Municipally Designated Site
- Official name: Macdonald House
- Designation: Winnipeg Landmark Heritage Structure
- Recognized: April 4, 1995
- CRHP listing: October 25, 2007
- Recognition authority: City of Winnipeg
- ID: 8120

Dalnavert, also known as Macdonald House, is a historic house museum located in Winnipeg, Manitoba, Canada. It was designated as a National Historic Site of Canada in 1990.

== History ==
Built in 1895 on Hudson's Bay Company Reserve land, it was the home of Sir Hugh John Macdonald, former Premier of Manitoba and son of Canada's First Prime Minister, Sir John A. Macdonald; his wife Gertrude Agnes VanKoughnet; and their children, Daisy and Jack. The house is an example of Queen Anne Revival architecture, and it has been furnished for the late Victoria era. It was restored by the Manitoba Historical Society with the supervision of John Chivers, Restoration Architect, and George Walker, Interior Designer. A committee of the Junior League of Winnipeg completed acquisition of equipment for the kitchen. The furnishing of the balance of the house was under the joint chairmanship of Miss Kathleen Richardson and Mrs. Kathleen Campbell. A Visitors Centre was constructed in 2005 with Wins Bridgman as its architect. The Museum and Visitors' Centre are currently operated by the Friends of Dalnavert.

It was temporarily closed in November 2013, but was reopened in May 2015 thanks to extensive community support and campaigning by the Friends of Dalnavert. It is now a tourist attraction, especially at Christmas time.

The Dalnavert Museum is open to visitors year round. Summer hours are 10:00 a.m. - 4:00 p.m. Wednesday to Sunday, and 12:00 p.m. - 4:00 p.m. Wednesday to Sunday during the winter. The museum is affiliated with the CMA, CHIN, and Virtual Museum of Canada.
