= Agnes Gertrude VanKoughnet =

Canadian socialite (c.1860–1940)

- Born: c. 1860
- Died: July 18, 1940; Dalnavert, Winnipeg, Manitoba, Canada
- Resting place: St. John’s Cathedral Cemetery
- Other names: Gertie Macdonald; Agnes Gertrude, Lady Macdonald
- Spouse: Hugh John Macdonald
- Children: John Alexander ("Jack")
- Father: S. J. VanKoughnet
- Relatives: Philip Michael Matthew Scott VanKoughnet (uncle)

Agnes Gertrude Macdonald née VanKoughnet (c. 1860 – 1940) also known as Gertie Macdonald, was a Canadian socialite and second wife of Hugh John Macdonald.

== Biography ==
VanKoughnet married Hugh John MacDonald, who was ten years her senior, on April 26, 1883, at St. Stephen's church in Toronto. After their marriage, the two moved from Winnipeg to Toronto, where they lived until 1887. In 1885, the two had a son who they named John Alexander after MacDonald's father and nicknamed Jack.

In 1887, the Macdonalds returned to Winnipeg. Construction of Dalnavert House was completed in 1895 when the family moved in. VanKoughnet was First Lady of Manitoba in 1900. Later, when Hugh John was made a Knight Bachelor in 1913, she officially became Lady Agnes Gertrude Macdonald. In 1905, VanKoughnet's son Jack died from complications due to diabetes; her husband, Hugh John, died in 1929. Following her husband's death, VanKoughnet moved from Dalnavert to an apartment on Roslyn Road.

In Winnipeg, VanKoughnet was involved in many social events. When the Duke and Duchess of Cornwall visited in 1901, she attended a luncheon in their honour and was seated at the head table. She also attended a luncheon at the Government House of Manitoba in 1939 celebrating a visit from King George VI and Queen Elizabeth.

While living at Dalnavert, VanKoughnet had two strokes leading to health complications. VanKoughnet died on July 18, 1940, and was over 80 years old at the time. She was buried in St. John's Cathedral Cemetery in Winnipeg next to Hugh John MacDonald and her son Jack.

== Political career ==
Hugh John MacDonald counted on VanKoughnet to assist him with many of his political dealings. VanKoughnet was responsible for supervising Macdonald's 38 clerical workers and acting as his assistant. While serving as minister of the interior and superintendent general of Indian Affairs, Macdonald often left notes in the margins of his political papers with instructions for VanKoughnet.
