= Robert Baldwin Sullivan =

Canadian judge (1802–1853)

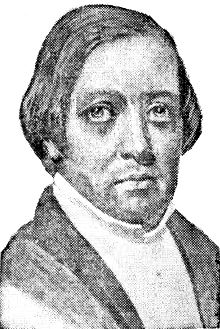

2nd Mayor of Toronto
- In office 1834–1836
- Preceded by: William Lyon Mackenzie
- Succeeded by: Thomas David Morrison

Member of the Legislative Council of the Province of Canada
- In office 1841–1851

Personal details
- Born: May 24, 1802 Bandon, County Cork, Ireland
- Died: April 14, 1853 (aged 50) Toronto, Canada West
- Resting place: Spadina House (Baldwin family cemetery)
- Relations: William Warren Baldwin, uncle

Robert Baldwin Sullivan, QC (May 24, 1802 – April 14, 1853), was an Irish-Canadian lawyer, judge, and politician who became the second Mayor of Toronto, Upper Canada.

== Career ==
In 1835, he was elected to Toronto City Council of the year-old city of Toronto and was chosen to be mayor. He added a business-like atmosphere to council with the official 'robes of office'. The Council worked on matters like tax rates, grants and the removal of 'filth and nuisances from the city streets'. On May 6, 1835, Council's Committee on draining and paving approved construction of the city's first main sewer on King Street into which all drains and sewers were to be connected.

In 1836, actions by new Lieutenant Governor Francis Bond Head triggered the resignation of the members of the Executive Council for the province. Sullivan accepted an appointment to the council. In the same year, he became the commissioner of crown lands. In 1839, he was appointed surveyor general of the province and became a member of the Legislative Council. Although criticized by many as a turncoat, he was an able administrator.

He supported the union of Upper and Lower Canada and was appointed to the Legislative Council of the Province of Canada. He served briefly as the first Commissioner of Crown Lands for the united province February 10, 1841 – June 30, 1841.

In 1848, he was appointed to the Queen's Bench. Judge Sullivan died April 14, 1853, in Toronto. He was buried on the Baldwin family estate, now the grounds of Spadina House in Toronto.

== Family ==
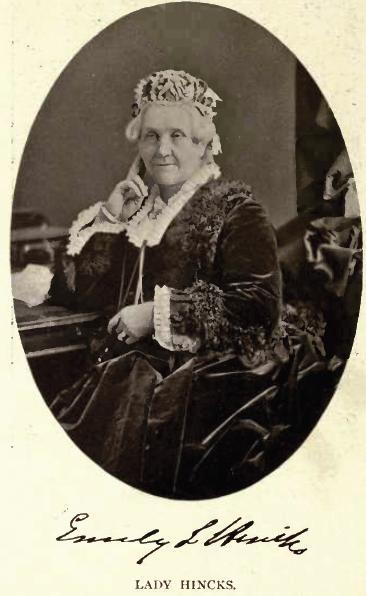
Justice Robert Baldwin Sullivan`s widow, Emily Louisa Hincks by William Notman

Baldwin was born in Bandon, County Cork in Ireland in 1802 and came to York, Upper Canada with his family in 1819. He studied law and was called to the bar in 1828. He moved to Vittoria, then the district town of the London District, and married in 1829, but returned to York after his wife's death in 1830.

Sullivan remarried in 1833, marrying Emily Louisa Delatre, daughter of Lieut.-Col. Philip Delatre, 1st Ceylon Regiment, and his second wife, Amey Scolding December 24, 1833. Emily Louisa was born in Ceylon. The couple had four sons and five daughters.

Emily Louisa remarried June 14, 1875, as the second wife of the Hon. Sir Francis Hincks, C.B., K.C.M.G., formerly Premier of the Province of Canada and, subsequently, Governor of the Windward Islands and of British Guiana. Lady Hincks died in Montreal May 14, 1880, aged 64. Sir Francis Hincks died in Montreal, August 18, 1885.

Political offices
Preceded by Sir John Beverly Robinson	Provincial Secretary of Upper Canada; 1838-1841	Succeeded by replaced by the Provincial Secretary of Canada West
