= Louis-Siméon Morin =

Canadian politician and court official (1831–1879)

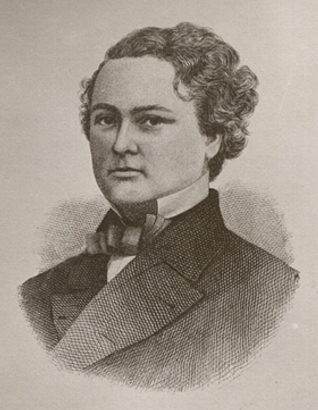
Louis-Siméon Morin

Louis-Siméon Morin (January 20, 1831 – May 7, 1879) was a Quebec lawyer and political figure.

He was born in Lavaltrie, Lower Canada in 1831, the son of Joseph Morin and Félicité Peltier whose uncle was Solomon Juneau, and studied at the Collège de l'Assomption. He apprenticed in law with Côme-Séraphin Cherrier and Antoine-Aimé Dorion. Morin was called to the bar in 1853 and set up practice in Montreal. In 1857, he was elected to the Legislative Assembly of the Province of Canada for Terrebonne. He was named attorney general for Canada East in 1860. He was defeated in Terrebonne in the general election in 1861 but elected for Laval in a by-election later that year. He served as French secretary for the committee codifying the civil law of Lower Canada from 1865 to 1867. In 1871, he was named a joint protonotary for the Quebec Superior Court and clerk of the crown for Joliette district.

After he was out of public life, he lived at Lavaltrie where he died.
