= Séraphin Cherrier =

Canadian politician

Séraphin Cherrier (November 7, 1762 – June 13, 1843) was a merchant and political figure in Lower Canada. He represented Richelieu in the Legislative Assembly of Lower Canada from 1815 to 1820.

He was born in Longueuil, the son of François-Pierre Cherrier and Marie Dubuc, and was educated at the Collège Saint-Raphaël in Montréal. He practised medicine at Saint-Denis where he was also in business. Cherrier was choirmaster there from 1813 to 1819. In 1785, he married Marie-Louise Loubet. Cherrier was elected to the assembly in an 1815 by-election held after the results of the 1814 election were declared invalid. He did not run for reelection in 1820. He died at Saint-Denis at the age of 80.

His brother Benjamin-Hyacinthe-Martin and his nephew Côme-Séraphin Cherrier also served in the assembly. His sister Rosalie married Joseph Papineau and his sister Périne-Charles married Denis Viger.
