= Saint Hyacinthe (Province of Canada electoral district) =

Electoral district in former Province of Canada

Saint Hyacinthe Canada East
Province of Canada electoral district

Defunct pre-Confederation electoral district
- Legislature: Legislative Assembly of the Province of Canada
- District created: 1841
- District abolished: 1867
- First contested: 1841
- Last contested: 1863

Saint Hyacinthe was an electoral district of the Legislative Assembly of the Parliament of the Province of Canada, in Canada East. It included the town of Saint Hyacinthe and the surrounding countryside. The district was created in 1841, based on the previous electoral district of the same name for the Legislative Assembly of Lower Canada.

Saint Hyacinthe was represented by one member in the Legislative Assembly. The electoral district was abolished in 1867, upon the creation of Canada and the province of Quebec.

== Boundaries ==
Saint Hyacinthe electoral district was centred on the town of Saint Hyacinthe, and included the surrounding countryside (now mainly in Les Maskoutains Regional County Municipality). The Yamaska River ran through the district, on its way north to the Saint Lawrence River.

The Union Act, 1840 merged the two provinces of Upper Canada and Lower Canada into the Province of Canada, with a single Parliament. The separate parliaments of Lower Canada and Upper Canada were abolished. The Union Act provided that the pre-existing electoral boundaries of Lower Canada and Upper Canada would continue to be used in the new Parliament, unless altered by the Union Act itself.

The Lower Canada electoral district of Saint Hyacinthe was not altered by the Act. It was therefore continued with the same boundaries in the new Parliament. Those boundaries had been set by a statute of Lower Canada in 1829:

The County of Saint Hyacinthe shall be bounded by the depth line of the seigniory of Saint Charles on the River Yamaska, beginning at the eastern angle of the said seigniory, proceeding until being prolonged it reaches the River Yamaska, thence by the said River Yamaska as far as the south west line of the augmentation of the seigniory of Saint Ours, thence by the said line as far as the depth line of the seigniory of Saint Denis, thence by the said depth line as far as the north east line of the seigniory of Saint Saint Charles on the River Richelieu, thence by the said north east line of Saint Charles as far as the depth line of the said seigniory, thence by the said depth line as far as the north east line of the seigniory of Rouville, thence by the said north east line as far as the depth line of the said seigniory of Rouville, thence by the said depth line as far as the line between Saint Hyacinthe and the augmentation of the seigniory of Monnoir, thence by the aforesaid line as far as the southern angle of the seigniory of Saint Hyacinthe, thence by the western line of part of the Township of Farnham and of the Townships of Granby and Milton, as far as the north west angle of the said Township of Milton, thence by the northern line of the said Township of Milton as far as the western line of the Township of Upton, thence by the said western line of Upton, as far as the south west line of part of the Township of Upton, and thence by the said south west line of the said Township of Upton as far as the eastern angle of the seigniory of Saint Charles on the River Yamaska; which County shall comprehend the seigniories of De Ramsay, Bourchemin east of the River Yamaska and Saint Hyacinthe.

== Members of the Legislative Assembly ==
Saint Hyacinthe was a single-member constituency.

The following were the members of the Legislative Assembly for Saint-Hyacinthe. The party affiliations are based on the biographies of individual members given by the National Assembly of Quebec, as well as votes in the Legislative Assembly. "Party" was a fluid concept, especially during the early years of the Province of Canada.

Parliament	Members	Years in office	Party
1st Parliament; 1841–1844	Thomas Boutillier	1841–1851	Anti-unionist; French-Canadian Group
2nd Parliament; 1844–1847	Thomas Boutillier	1841–1851	French-Canadian Group
3rd Parliament; 1848–1851	Thomas Boutillier	1841–1851	French-Canadian Group; Ministerialist
4th Parliament; 1851–1854	Louis-Victor Sicotte	1851–1854	Liberal

== Abolition ==
The district was abolished on July 1, 1867, when the British North America Act, 1867 came into force, creating Canada and splitting the Province of Canada into Quebec and Ontario. It was succeeded by electoral districts of the same name in the House of Commons of Canada and the Legislative Assembly of Quebec.
