= Philip Michael Matthew Scott VanKoughnet =

Canadian politician (1822–1869)

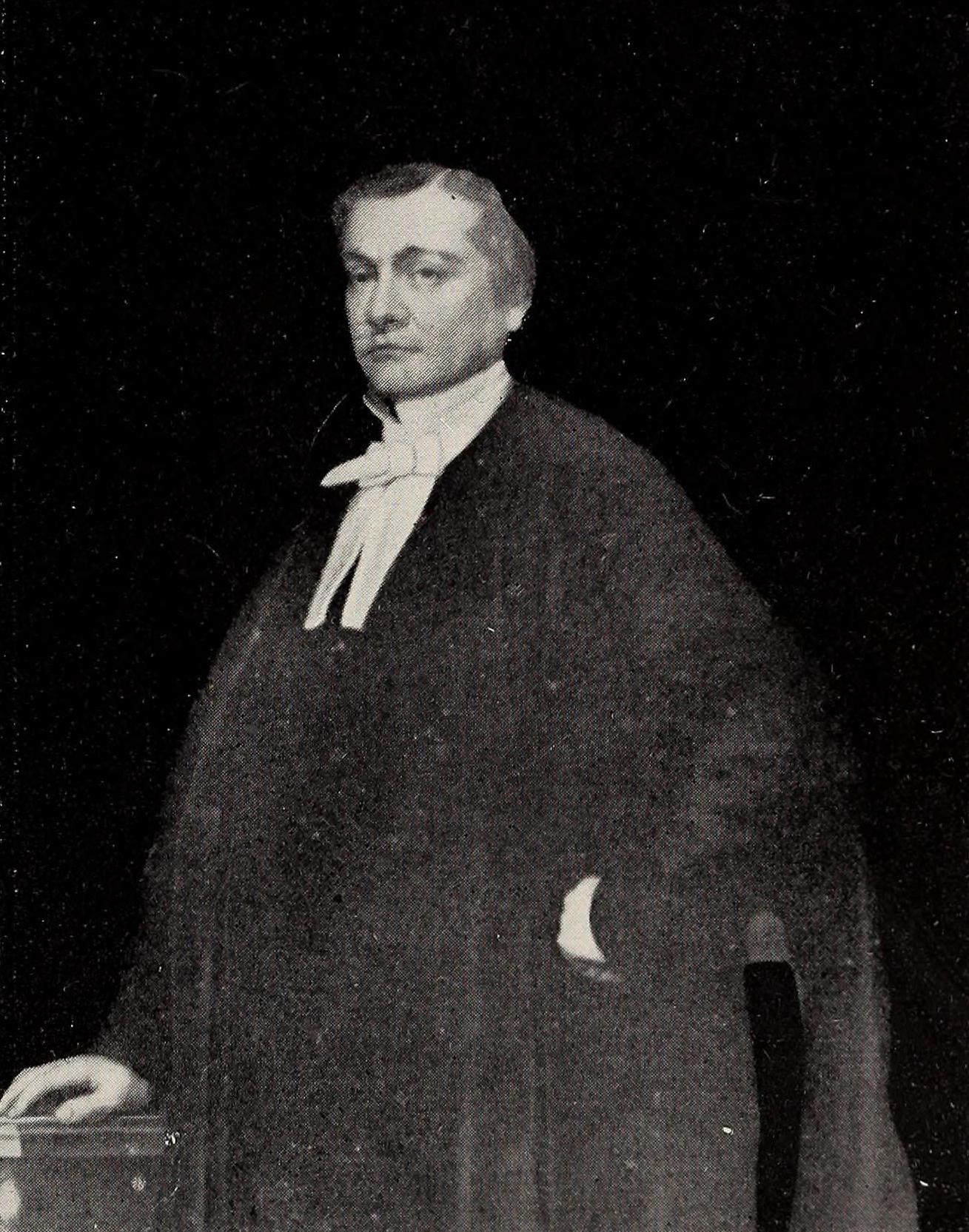
Painting of VanKoughnet, published 1905

Philip Michael Matthew Scott VanKoughnet, QC (January 21, 1822 – November 7, 1869), was a Canadian politician, lawyer and judge who held the positions of President of the Executive Council of the Province of Canada; Commissioner of Agriculture; Commissioner of Crown Lands and Chancellor of Upper Canada.

== Early life ==
Born at Cornwall, Upper Canada, he was the son of Colonel The Hon. Philip VanKoughnet and Harriet, daughter of Matthew Scott, of Carrick-on-Suir, who was a first cousin of Thomas Scott, 2nd Earl of Clonmell. VanKoughnet's immediate family were prominent in the political affairs of early Ontario. His brother, Salter, married a daughter of Senator Benjamin Seymour, and another brother, Matthew, married the sister of Sir James Buchanan Macaulay and John Simcoe Macaulay. They were first cousins of Mrs Alexander Morris and Brock Anderson who was married to Amelia Johnson, granddaughter of Sir John Johnson, 2nd Baronet. Another first cousin, Louisa Anderson, married Alexander MacDonald, uncle of Prime Minister John Sandfield Macdonald and Governor Donald Alexander Macdonald. VanKoughnet's nieces included Lady MacDonald, Lady van Straubenzee and Mrs Meredith.

His mother had planned for him to become a minister in the Church of England, but after serving in his father's battalion during the Upper Canada Rebellion, he went on to study law with George Stephen Benjamin Jarvis at Cornwall and then with another firm at Toronto. VanKoughnet was called to the Upper Canada bar in 1843, and in partnership with his brother, Matthew, they went on to acquire the largest legal practice in Upper Canada. He lectured in law at the University of Trinity College and also served on its council. He became a Queen's Counsel in 1850.

== Politics ==
Spending a fortune to do so, VanKoughnet entered politics in 1856. During his campaign, he expressed the belief that the ownership of Rupert's Land and the North-Western Territory should be transferred from the Hudson's Bay Company and that they should become part of the Province of Canada. Following the resignation of Sir Allan Napier MacNab he was named President of the Executive Council of the Province of Canada and Minister of Agriculture in the administration of Sir Étienne-Paschal Taché; he was elected to the Legislative Council of the Province of Canada for the Rideau district later that same year.

VanKoughnet efficiently reorganised the department of Agriculture, and in particular took effective measures to check the ravages of the Hessian fly and weevil. In August 1858, he was named Commissioner of Crown Lands in the Cartier-Macdonald administration, and held office for four years. In 1860, he was also appointed the first Chief Superintendent of Indian Affairs. During his time as Commissioner of Crown Lands he established the system of selling townships en bloc, and opened up some of the best colonization roads.

He also acted as Leader of the Conservative Government in the Legislative Council of the Province of Canada, or Upper House of Canada. He was named Chancellor of the Court of Chancery of Upper Canada in 1862 and named Chancellor of Ontario in 1867. He held that office till his death, having declined the office of Chief Justice which Macdonald made him in 1868. Vankoughnet died at Toronto on 7 Nov., 1869.

He was a close political and personal friend of Sir John A. Macdonald, but made his way chiefly through his own abilities. His niece, Gertrude Agnes VanKoughnet, married Sir John's only son, Sir Hugh John Macdonald. VanKoughnet was a forcible and fluent speaker, and an able lawyer. An annual award is made in his name to a member of the graduating law class of Osgoode Hall Law School, where his full-length portrait hangs. A small village in Muskoka, on the old Peterson Colonization Road, was named for him.

== Family ==
Philip VanKoughnet married Elizabeth Turner (b. 1829), daughter of Colonel Charles Barker Turner (1787–1853), Knight of Hanover (Royal Guelphic Order); veteran of the Battle of Waterloo and the Peninsular War, who settled in Canada in 1845. Mrs VanKoughnet's mother, Eliza, was the daughter of Major-General John Hassard (1797–1848) R.E., C.M.G. They were the parents of two sons. After graduating from Bishop's University, their eldest son went to live in Ireland. Their second son settled in England at Tyttenhanger House, Hertfordshire. The latter was Captain Edmund Barker VanKoughnet (1849–1905) R.N., J.P., C.M.G., who married Lady Jane Charlotte Elizabeth Alexander (1850–1941), daughter of James Alexander, 3rd Earl of Caledon. Lady Jane VanKoughnet wrote a history of her husband's family, 'The von Gochnats'.
