= Gédéon-Mélasippe Prévost =

Gédéon-Mélasippe Prévost (April 4, 1817 – February 2, 1887) was a Quebec notary and political figure.

He was born in Sainte-Anne-des-Plaines, Lower Canada in 1817 and studied at the Petit Séminaire de Sainte-Thérèse. He articled as a notary, received his commission in 1838 and set up practice at Terrebonne. Prévost served on the village council from 1854 to 1857 and was mayor from 1860 to 1869. He was elected to the Legislative Assembly of the Province of Canada for Terrebonne in 1854, defeating Augustin-Norbert Morin, but resigned in 1857 to allow Louis-Siméon Morin to be elected in his place.

He died at Terrebonne in 1887.

His brother Wilfrid and his nephew, Jules-Édouard Prévost, were members of the Canadian House of Commons.
