= Michael McCulloch =

Province of Canada physician and politician (1797-1854)

Member of the Legislative Assembly of the Province of Canada for Terrebonne
- In office 1841–1844
- Preceded by: New position
- Succeeded by: Louis-Hippolyte LaFontaine

Personal details
- Born: 1797 Ireland
- Died: July 12, 1854 (aged 56–57) Montreal, Canada East, Province of Canada
- Party: "British" Tory
- Profession: Physician

Michael McCulloch (ca 1797 – July 12, 1854) was a medical doctor and political figure in Canada East, Province of Canada (now Quebec). He represented the constituency of Terrebonne in the Legislative Assembly of the Province of Canada from 1841 to 1844, as a Tory and supporter of the British-appointed Governor General, Lord Sydenham.

The Terrebonne election in 1841 was marked by threats of violence from McCulloch's supporters. The reform candidate, Louis-Hippolyte LaFontaine, withdrew from the election to protect the lives of his supporters. McCulloch was declared the winner without votes being cast. The episode contributed to the formation of the alliance of reformers from Canada East and Canada West (now Ontario), led by LaFontaine and Robert Baldwin.

== Medical career ==
McCulloch was born in Ireland and studied medicine in Scotland. He settled in Montreal in 1822 and was licensed to practise medicine in Lower Canada the following year. McCulloch taught obstetrics at McGill College, and was a member of the Royal College of Surgeons of England. He received an honorary degree from McGill in 1843.

== Political career, 1841–1844 ==
=== The Election in Terrebonne, 1841 ===
Following the rebellion in Lower Canada, and the similar rebellion in 1837 in Upper Canada (now Ontario), the British government decided to merge the two provinces into a single province, as recommended by Lord Durham in the Durham Report. The Union Act, 1840, passed by the British Parliament, abolished the two provinces and their separate parliaments. It created the Province of Canada, with a single Parliament for the entire province, composed of an elected Legislative Assembly and an appointed Legislative Council. The Governor General initially retained a strong position in the government.

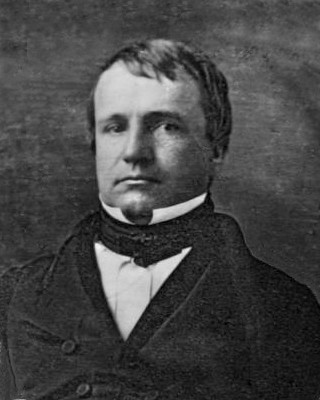
Louis-Hippolyte LaFontaine, McCulloch's opponent in the Terrebonne election

In 1841, McCulloch stood for election to the Legislative Assembly for the riding of Terrebonne, north-west of Montreal. The election in Terrebonne became a major political battleground. McCulloch was in favour of the union of the Canadas, and a Tory supporter of the government of the Governor General, Lord Sydenham. McCulloch's opponent was Louis-Hippolyte LaFontaine, a former member of the Parti patriote. LaFontaine had been a supporter of Louis-Joseph Papineau in the run-up to the Lower Canada Rebellion, but he had changed his position and favoured an electoral alliance with the reformers of Upper Canada (now Ontario), to achieve constitutional reforms through responsible government. LaFontaine's "Address to the Electors of Terrebonne" set out his new platform.

The election turned violent, which was not unknown in that period. Voting was at a single polling location, and was done by open-ballot, where each voter publicly declared their vote for their preferred candidate. McCulloch's supporters planned in advance to try to prevent LaFontaine and his supporters from being able to vote, even though the French-Canadian population of the riding was much larger than the English-speaking population. One English-language newspaper in Montreal made this point clear:

From the known character of the majority of the electors in Terrebonne, we doubt not that LaFontaine would be returned if all the voters were polled; but it must be the duty of the loyalists to muster in their strength and keep the poll!"

McCulloch's supporters were armed, many with clubs and some with firearms. Approximately 500 men were blocking the road to the poll, many of them brought in from outside of the constituency. LaFontaine, conscious of the great risk of harm to his supporters, withdrew from the election. McCulloch was declared elected by acclamation. The entire episode was part of Lord Sydenham's plan to use threats of violence to intimidate French-Canadians from exercising their right to vote.

Although McCulloch was returned as the member, the violence and exclusion of French-Canadian voters from the poll strengthened LaFontaine's resolve and his goal of building an alliance with Upper Canada reformers. It also led to support from the Upper Canada reformers led by Robert Baldwin, who personally invited LaFontaine to stand for election in a vacant seat in Canada West, York Fourth, where he was welcomed by the reform voters. Étienne Parent, a leading journalist from Quebec, accompanied LaFontaine to Canada West, and reported on their reception from the reformers: "Ils élisent M. Lafontaine pour montrer, disent-ils, leur sympathie envers les Bas-Canadiens, et leur détestation des mauvais traitements et des injustices auxquelles nous avons été exposés." (Note: "They elect M. Lafontaine to show, they say, their sympathy towards Lower Canadians, and their detestation of the bad treatment and injustices to which we have been exposed.") LaFontaine's victory in York First was the beginning of the reform alliance which would lead to responsible government and popular control of the government of the Province.

=== Term in the Legislative Assembly ===
In the first session of the new Assembly, the major issue was a resolution to condemn the way the union had been imposed on Lower Canada. John Neilson, one of the leaders of the French-Canadian Group, introduced the resolution. In the vote on the resolution, McCulloch supported the union and voted against the resolution, which was defeated.

For the rest of his term as a member, McCulloch was a dependable vote for the Governor General, opposed to the policies of the reform groups from Canada East and Canada West. He was part of a group of English-Canadians from Canada East, informally referred to as "British" Tories.

== Later life and death ==
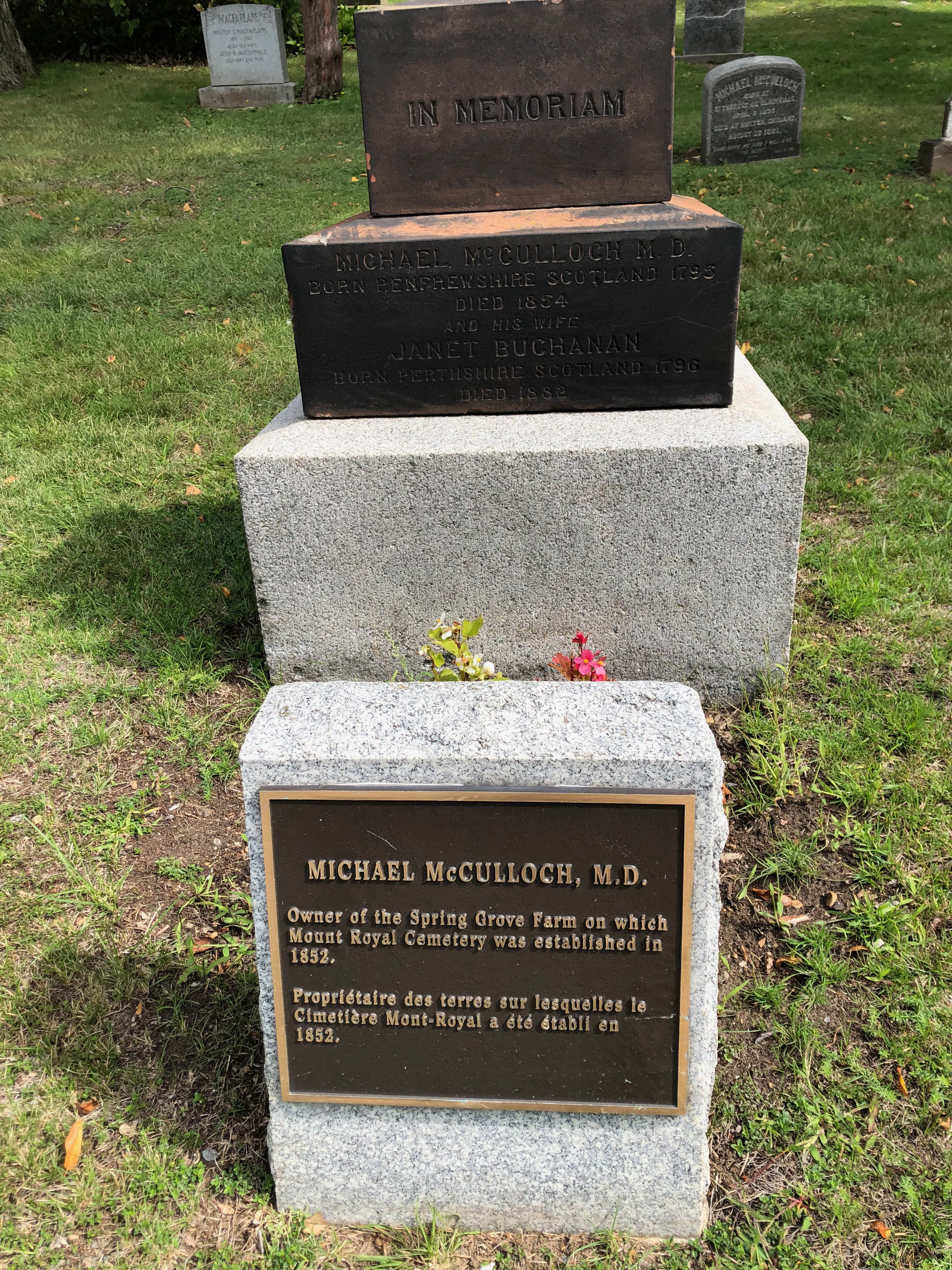
McCulloch's funeral monument in Mount Royal Cemetery

McCulloch did not stand for re-election to the Assembly in 1844. Instead, LaFontaine was elected by acclamation in Terrebonne.

In 1849, McCulloch supported annexation by the United States, as set out in the Montreal Annexation Manifesto.

McCulloch at one point owned a parcel of land on Mount Royal. In 1851, he sold it to the Protestant community in Montreal, which used it as part of the new Mount Royal Cemetery.

McCulloch died in Montreal in 1854, aged around 57 years. His funeral was held at Erskine Presbyterian church.
