= Beatrice Cherrier =

French economic historian

- Education: Ecole Normale Supérieure de Cachan, The University Paris XII, University of Paris Sorbonne, University of Paris X-Nanterre, University of Caen
- Scientific career
- Fields: Economics
- Workplaces: CREST; CNRS; ENSAE/Ecole Polytechnique; University of Cergy Pontoise; University of Caen
- Website: https://beatricecherrier.wordpress.com/

Beatrice Cherrier is a historian of economics and associate professor at CREST, CNRS, and ENSAE/Ecole Polytechnique, France. Her research interests include the history of economics since World War II. She has been cited in the popular media on several topics in the history of economics, including theories of discrimination, the rise of the MIT economics department, and the representation of women in the economics profession.

== Biography ==
Beatrice Cherrier earned a BS in Economics from the Ecole Normale Supérieure de Cachan and in Management Science from The University Paris XII in 2001, a Master of Arts in the Methodology of Economics from the University of Paris Sorbonne in 2004, a PhD in the History of Economics from the University of Paris X-Nanterre, and a Habilitation from the University of Caen in 2016. She was a postdoctoral scholar at Duke University, an assistant professor at the University of Caen (Alençon Technical College) from 2012 to 2017, and served on the faculty of the CNRS & Théorie Économique, Modélisation, Application (THEMA), University of Cergy Pontoise as a tenured associate professor from 2017 to 2020. Since 2020, she has been an associate professor at CNRS, CREST, and ENSAE/Ecole Polytechnique. She was awarded the CNRS Bronze medal in 2021.

== Research ==
Professor Cherrier has studied how world events affected the intellectual development of Gunnar Myrdal, Jacob Marschak and Milton Friedman, and how economists’ individual visions combined in the development of the MIT economics department. In more recent work, she is studying the rise of applied economics, such as the rise of empirical work in urban economics, public economics, and macro econometric modeling, beginning in the mid-1960s. She has also studied changes in the classification of economic publications over time.

=== Selected works ===
- Cherrier, Beatrice. "Classifying economics: A history of the JEL codes." Journal of Economic Literature 55, no. 2 (2017): 545–79.
- Backhouse, Roger E., and Béatrice Cherrier. "The age of the applied economist: the transformation of economics since the 1970s." History of Political Economy 49, no. Supplement (2017): 1-33.
- Cherrier, Beatrice. "The lucky consistency of Milton Friedman’s science and politics, 1933-1963." Building Chicago Economics (2011): 335–368.
- Cherrier, Béatrice. "Rationalizing human organization in an uncertain world: Jacob Marschak, from Ukrainian prisons to behavioral science laboratories." History of political economy 42, no. 3 (2010): 443–467.
- Cherrier, Beatrice. "Toward a History of Economics at MIT, 1940-72." History of Political Economy 46, no. suppl_1 (2014): 15–44.
