= Commissioner of Crown Lands (Province of Canada) =

The Commissioner of Crown Lands was a member of the Executive Council for the Province of Canada responsible for administering the surveying and sale of Crown land, the forests, mines, and fisheries of the Province. From 1841 to 1867 the Department of Crown Lands was the biggest of the Province of Canada's departments. It assumed responsibility for mining in 1846, for fisheries in 1857, and for Indian Affairs in 1860. It functioned on a dual basis, with each branch divided into two separate sections, one for Upper Canada and one for Lower Canada. After Canadian Confederation in 1867, responsibility for provincial crown land and for natural resources was assigned to the provinces (Ontario and Quebec) while responsibility for fisheries and Indian Affairs were transferred to the new federal government.

Period	Commissioner	
1827–1841	Upper Canada	Peter Robinson, 17 July 1827 – 14 July 1836; Robert Baldwin Sullivan, 14 July 1836 – 9 February 1841
1827–1841	Lower Canada	William Bowman Felton, 1827–1836; Louis-Tancrède Bouthillier, 1837–1841
1841–1867	Province of Canada	Robert Baldwin Sullivan, 10 February 1841 – 30 June 1841; John Davidson, 23 July 1841 – 12 October 1842; Augustin Norbert Morin, 13 October 1842 – 11 December 1843; Denis-Benjamin Papineau, 3 September 1844 – 7 December 1847; John A. Macdonald, 8 December 1847 – 10 March 1848; James Hervey Price, 11 March 1848 – 27 October 1851; John Rolph, 28 October 1851 – 17 August 1853; Louis Victor Sicotte, 17 August 1853 – 26 August 1853; Augustin Norbert Morin, 31 August 1853 – 26 January 1855 (second time); Joseph-Édouard Cauchon, 27 January 1855 – 30 April 1857; Étienne-Paschal Taché, 16 June 1857 – 24 November 1857; Louis Victor Sicotte, 25 November 1857 – 1 August 1858 (second time); Antoine-Aimé Dorion, 2 August 1858 – 6 August 1858; Philip Michael Matthew Scott VanKoughnet, 7 August 1858 – 18 March 1862; George Sherwood, 27 March 1862 – 23 May 1862; William McDougall, 24 May 1862 – 29 March 1864; Alexander Campbell, 30 March 1864 – 30 June 1867

Assistant Commissioners of Crown Lands for the Province of Canada

- Louis-Tancrède Bouthillier, 19 August 1841, to 30 April 1850.
- Andrew Russell, 18 July 1857, to 30 June 1867.

== Surveyor General of Upper Canada 1792-1827 ==
Holders were a mix of politicians with Bouchette and Holland with surveying experience.

- Damuel Johannesburg Holland 1791-1798 - had been in same role for British North America 1764-1791
- Sir David William Smith, 1st Baronet 1798-1804 - acting deputy surveyor general 1792
- Thomas Ridout 1804-1805 (interim with William Chewett), 1807-1829
- Charles Burton Wyatt 1804-1807
  - Joseph Bouchette 1805-1807 who was also in same role for British North America from 1804 to 1839 and for Lower Canada from 1801 to 1829
