= Denis-Benjamin Papineau =

Province of Canada seigneur and politician

Joint Premier of the Province of Canada (Canada East)
- In office 1846–1847 Serving with William Henry Draper (1846–1847); Henry Sherwood (1847)
- Preceded by: Denis-Benjamin Viger
- Succeeded by: Vacant from December 8, 1847 to March 10, 1848

Commissioner of Crown Lands
- In office September 3, 1844–1847
- Preceded by: Vacant since December 11, 1843
- Succeeded by: John A. Macdonald

Member of the Legislative Assembly of the Province of Canada for Ottawa County
- In office 1842–1847 (1 by-election and 1 general election)
- Preceded by: Charles Dewey Day
- Succeeded by: John Egan

Personal details
- Born: November 13, 1789 Montreal, Old Province of Quebec
- Died: January 20, 1854 (aged 64) Sainte-Angélique, Canada East
- Party: French-Canadian Group (1842–1843) "British" Tory (1844–1847)
- Spouse: Angélique Louise Cornud
- Relations: Joseph Papineau (father); Louis-Joseph Papineau (brother); André Papineau (uncle); André-Benjamin Papineau (cousin); Denis-Benjamin Viger (cousin); Louis-Michel Viger (cousin); Côme-Séraphin Cherrier (cousin); Jean-Jacques Lartigue (cousin)
- Children: 9, including Denis-Emery Papineau
- Education: Petit Séminaire de Québec
- Occupation: Seigneurial agent, merchant, bookseller, justice of the peace
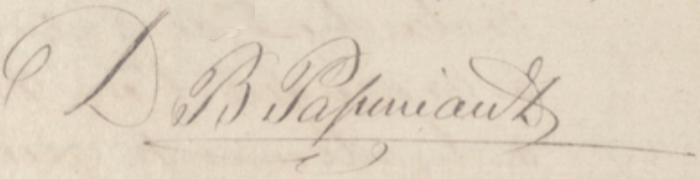
- Signature

Denis-Benjamin Papineau (French pronunciation: [dəni bɛ̃ʒamɛ̃ papino]; November 13, 1789 – January 20, 1854) was joint premier of the Province of Canada for Canada East from 1846 to 1847. The joint premiers for Canada West during this period were William Henry Draper (1846 to 1847) and then Henry Sherwood (1847).

Papineau was part of the interconnected Papineau, Viger, and Cherrier families, who were politically active during the early to mid-19th century in Lower Canada (now Quebec). His father, Joseph Papineau, and his uncle, André Papineau, had both been members of the Legislative Assembly of Lower Canada. His older brother, Louis-Joseph Papineau, was a leader of the Patriote movement leading up to the Lower Canada Rebellion. A cousin, André-Benjamin Papineau, had also been a Patriote member of the Assembly. Another cousin, Denis-Benjamin Viger, was also involved in the Patriote movement, and later served as joint premier of the Province of Canada.

Unlike his brother and cousins, Papineau was not politically active during the lead-up to the Rebellion. It was not until 1842 that he entered politics, when he was elected to the Legislative Assembly of the Province of Canada in a by-election, as the member for Ottawa County, Canada East. Two years later, in 1844, Viger invited Papineau to join his new government. Papineau became the Commissioner of Crown Lands with a seat in the Executive Council. When Viger withdrew from politics in 1846, Papineau succeeded him as joint premier from Canada East. Papineau in turn retired from politics late in 1847.

Prior to his political career, Papineau was involved in various commercial activities. He was the manager of the family seigneury of Petite-Nation, first for his father, then for his brother Louis-Joseph. He also had a share in a bookstore in Montreal, and some commercial activities in the Petit-Nation area. He was the postmaster for Petit-Nation, and had several term appointments as a justice of the peace in the Montreal district.

After withdrawing from politics, Papineau retired to Petite-Nation, where he died in 1854.

== Family and early life ==
Denis-Benjamin Papineau was born in 1789 in Montreal, in the old Province of Quebec, the son of Joseph Papineau and Rosalie Cherrier. His father was a successful surveyor and notary, and a member of the Legislative Assembly of Lower Canada. He had risen into the seigneurial class by buying the seigneury of Petite-Nation (now located in the Papineau Regional County Municipality in western Quebec, on the Ottawa River). Denis-Benjamin's older brother, Louis-Joseph Papineau, was also elected to the Legislative Assembly and became the major leader of the Parti canadien (later known as the Parti patriote), leading up to the Lower Canada Rebellion of 1837.

Like his older brother, Denis-Benjamin studied at the Petit Séminaire de Québec, from 1801 to 1807. In 1813, he married Angélique-Louise Cornud. They would have nine children, including Denis-Emery Papineau, who became a politician and leading notary.

== Development of Petite-Nation ==
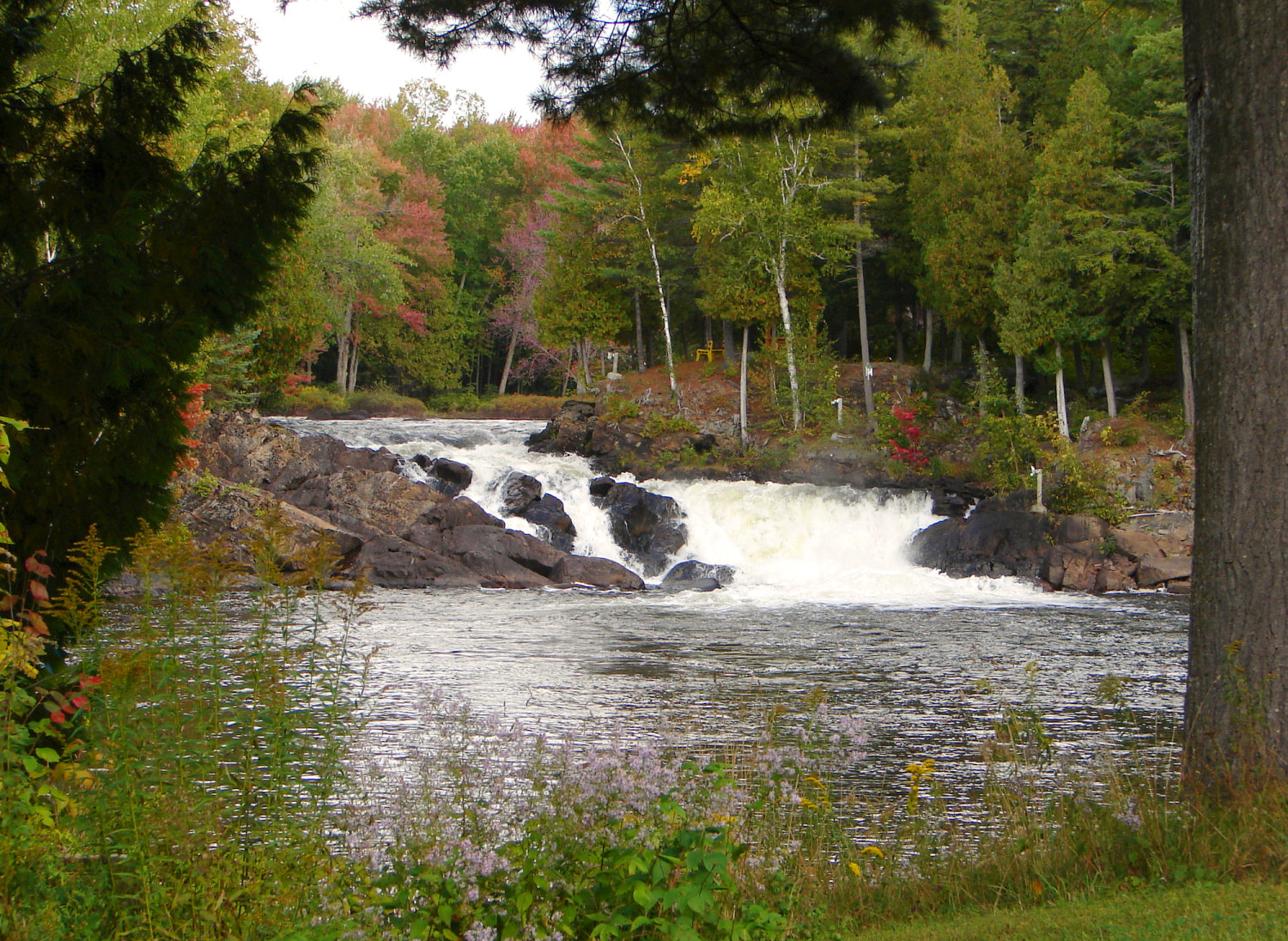
Petit-Nation River, the namesake for the seigneury

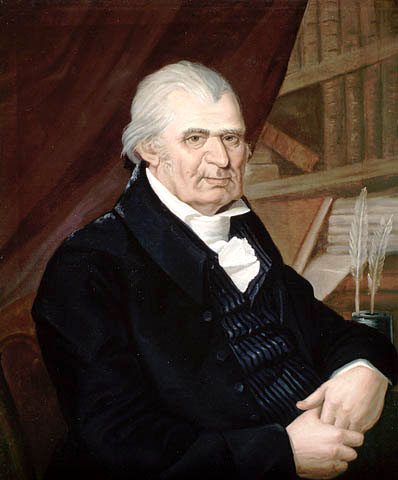
Joseph Papineau, father of Louis-Joseph and Denis-Benjamin Papineau

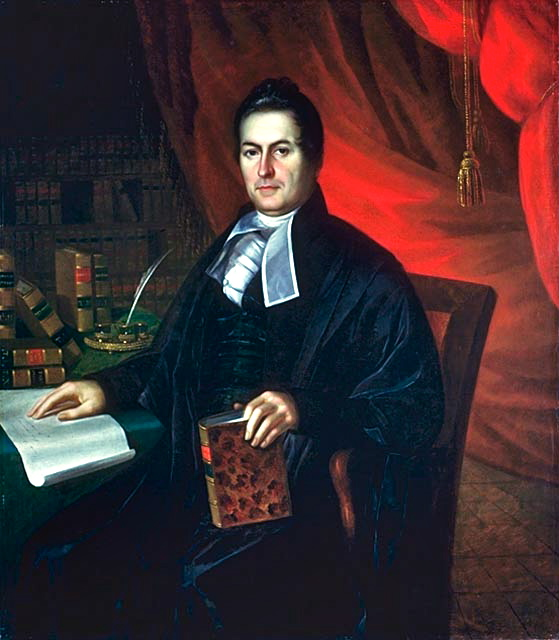
Louis-Joseph Papineau, Denis-Benjamin Papineau's older brother, around 1832

Unlike his father and his brother, Papineau did not train as a lawyer. Instead, starting in 1808, he oversaw the operation of the seigneury of Petite-Nation, first for his father Joseph, and later for his brother, Louis-Joseph, who bought the seigneury from their father in 1817. His tasks included encouraging settlement into the area and developing the lumber trade and sawmills, in the rich timber area of the Ottawa River valley. His correspondence with his father during this period indicate that his father criticised him for his business decisions. He continued to manage the seigneury for his brother, including the period when Louis-Joseph was in exile after the Rebellion. Louis-Joseph sent letters to Denis-Benjamin, criticising him for not collecting enough rents from the tenants.

Papineau tried to develop a horse-breeding business, but without success. He had greater success with sheep, at one point building up a flock of over 200 sheep. In 1822, he became a seigneur in his own right, buying the fief of Plaisance, located near Petit-Nation, but he was forced to sell part of it a few years later because of financial difficulties.

As part of the efforts to encourage settlement, Papineau was involved in developing the parish and municipality in the area. In 1821, the vicar general of the diocese of Montreal, Jean-Jacques Lartigue (another of Papineau's cousins), issued an order permitting the erection of a chapel dedicated to Notre-Dame-de-Bonsecours. Ten years later, Papineau and seventy-five other residents sent a petition to the Bishop of Quebec for the creation of a parish. The bishop granted the request, with a recommendation that the residents also seek the creation of a civil parish. In 1845, the Governor General of the Province of Canada issued an order creating a number of civil parishes based on existing ecclesiastical parishes, including the new municipality of Notre-Dame-des-Bonsecours.

Papineau was involved in merchant activities in the Petit-Nation area, and served as the postmaster for the region. He was a partner in a Montreal bookstore, and was named a justice of the peace for Montreal district on several occasions.

== Political career ==
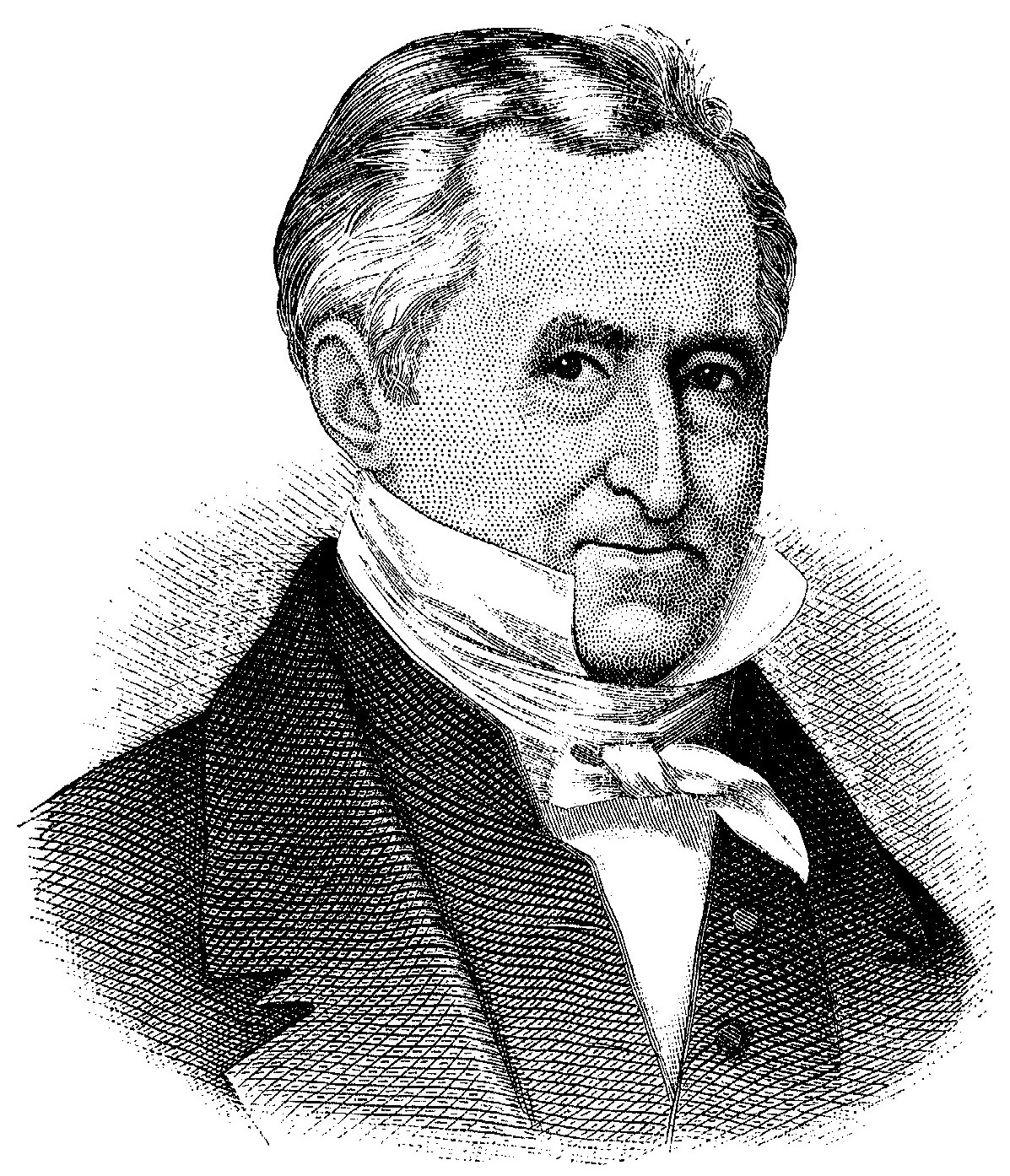
Denis-Benjamin Viger, Papineau's cousin and predecessor as government leader from Canada East

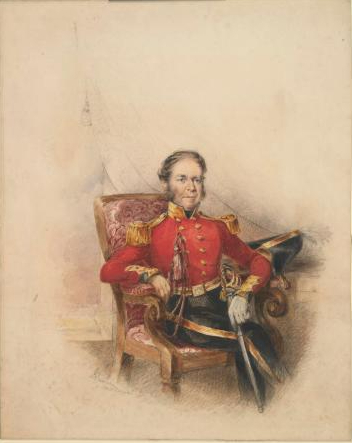
Governor General Metcalfe, who appointed Papineau to the Executive Council

Papineau was not politically active as a young man, unlike his older brother and several cousins, who were involved in the Patriote movement and had been members of the Legislative Assembly of Lower Canada leading up to the Rebellion. It was not until the formation of the Province of Canada in 1841, merging Lower Canada with Upper Canada (now Ontario), that Papineau became involved in politics. In 1842, he was elected in a by-election in the electoral constituency of Ottawa County, on the Lower Canada side of the Ottawa River. In the Assembly, he joined the French-Canadian Group, a parliamentary caucus which generally opposed the government of the Governor General. Papineau's cousin Denis-Benjamin Viger was initially one of the leaders of the Group.

Papineau entered politics just as a political crisis was brewing, which eventually led to him becoming joint premier. In 1843, all but one of the members of the Executive Council, led by Louis-Hippolyte LaFontaine and Robert Baldwin, resigned in protest at actions taken by Governor General Charles Metcalfe, without consulting the council. The Assembly passed a resolution criticising Metcalfe and supporting LaFontaine and Baldwin. The vote on the resolution revealed a split in the French-Canadian Group. While most of the members of the Group, including Papineau, supported LaFontaine and voted for the resolution, two of the older members of the Group, Viger and John Neilson, supported Metcalfe and voted against the resolution. The result was a surprise, since Viger and Neilson had a long history of opposing the governors prior to the Rebellion.

Metcalfe then appointed Viger as joint premier, along with a moderate Tory from Upper Canada, William Draper. However, they lacked political support from the Assembly. Almost a year went by without additional appointments to the council. Finally, in September 1844, Viger and Draper were able to persuade some members of the Assembly to be appointed to the council. One of them was Papineau, who accepted the office of Commissioner of Crown Lands. Governor General Metcalfe and Viger hoped that appointing Papineau would gain support from French-Canadians, given the political strength of his family. Metcalfe then dissolved Parliament and called new elections.

The elections did not go well for the government. LaFontaine was now the clear leader of the French-Canadian Group. Viger and Neilson were both defeated in their own ridings, and LaFontaine and his supporters won a strong majority of the seats from Canada East. Papineau was one of the few members of the government in Canada East who was re-elected. After the elections, Governor General Metcalfe kept the Viger–Draper ministry in office, supported primarily by Draper and the Tories, who had won a majority of the seats in Upper Canada.

Instead of gaining support for the government, Papineau's appointment to the Council furthered the split in the French-Canadian Group. His own brother, Louis-Joseph Papineau, had earlier been critical of anyone who took an appointment from the governor, saying: "One cannot accept a position as minister and remain an honourable man." Louis-Joseph, now in exile in Paris, refused to endorse the new government, even with his brother as a member. Viger and Denis-Benjamin Papineau were considered to be Tories, supporting the governor.

Denis-Benjamin Papineau did not help his reputation with French-Canadians by his first vote in the Assembly after the 1844 elections. In the election of the new Speaker, he voted for Allan MacNab, a unilingual Family Compact Tory from Upper Canada. Nor did Papineau appear to have a firm grasp of parliamentary procedure, contradicting one of his own government colleagues during the debate on the speech from the throne. He was also hampered by his own deafness, making it difficult for him to follow the debates.

He did win some support by introducing an address to Queen Victoria, requesting that the statutory restrictions on the use of French in the Assembly be lifted, but he also attracted further criticism for introducing legislation to reorganise the schools and municipalities, triggering opposition from the Catholic church and landowners. Another controversial position was his support for compensation for residents in Upper Canada who had their property damaged during the Rebellion, while not bringing in a similar compensation system for residents of Lower Canada.

In light of Viger's failure to earn political support in Lower Canada, Draper began to make overtures to other French-Canadian politicians, suggesting that Viger and Papineau might both retire from politics to make way for others. Papineau was aware of the negotiations and appeared willing to retire, but Draper's efforts did not bear fruit. Viger remained in office for another year, until June 1846, when he retired from politics, resigning his leadership position in the ministry. Papineau took over as the leader of the Canada East members in the council. At first he was paired with Draper, who continued as leader of the Canada West members, but Draper resigned a year later, in May 1847. Draper's position was taken by Henry Sherwood, a Family Compact Tory from Toronto. There was considerable turnover in the membership of the Executive Council in the eighteen months after Viger's retirement (including the addition of a young John A. Macdonald in 1847). Not much was achieved by the ministry before Parliament was dissolved in December 1847. Papineau resigned his seat in the Executive Council at that time, and did not stand for re-election in the general elections that followed.

== Later life and death ==
Papineau retired to Petite-Nation after his term as joint-premier. In ill health, he died in 1854 at Sainte-Angélique (now Papineauville).

In 1858, his son, Denis-Émery Papineau, was elected to represent Ottawa County, the same seat his father had held.

== See also ==
- 1st Parliament of the Province of Canada
- 2nd Parliament of the Province of Canada
