= Louis-Hippolyte Lafontaine =

Canadian politician (1807–1864)

Sir Louis-Hippolyte La Fontaine Bt KCMG KCSS
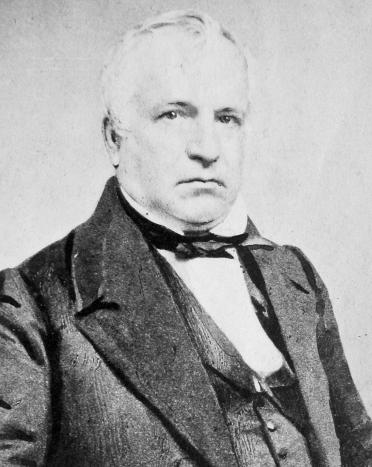
- Sir Louis-Hippolyte La Fontaine, Bt

Joint Premier of Province of Canada, for Canada East
- In office September 26, 1842 – November 27, 1843
- Preceded by: Samuel Harrison
- Succeeded by: Sir Dominick Daly
- In office March 11, 1848 – October 28, 1851
- Preceded by: Denis-Benjamin Papineau (deputy); Dominick Daly (as premier)
- Succeeded by: Augustin-Norbert Morin

Personal details
- Born: Louis Hippolyte Ménard; October 10, 1807 Boucherville, Lower Canada
- Died: February 26, 1864 (aged 56) Montreal, Province of Canada
- Party: Parti patriote, Reform
- Spouse(s): Adèle Berthelot, Jane Élisabeth Geneviève Morrison
- Profession: Lawyer

Sir Louis-Hippolyte Ménard dit La Fontaine, 1st Baronet, KCMG (October 4, 1807 – February 26, 1864) was a Canadian politician, jurist and statesman, who served as the first Premier of the United Province of Canada and the first head of a responsible government in Canada along side Robert Baldwin.

== Early life ==
La Fontaine was born in Boucherville, Lower Canada in 1807.

His last name is often written in one word (Lafontaine or LaFontaine); his own signature was one word.

== Political career ==
La Fontaine was first elected to the Legislative Assembly of Lower Canada in 1830.

=== Province of Canada: The fight for responsible government ===
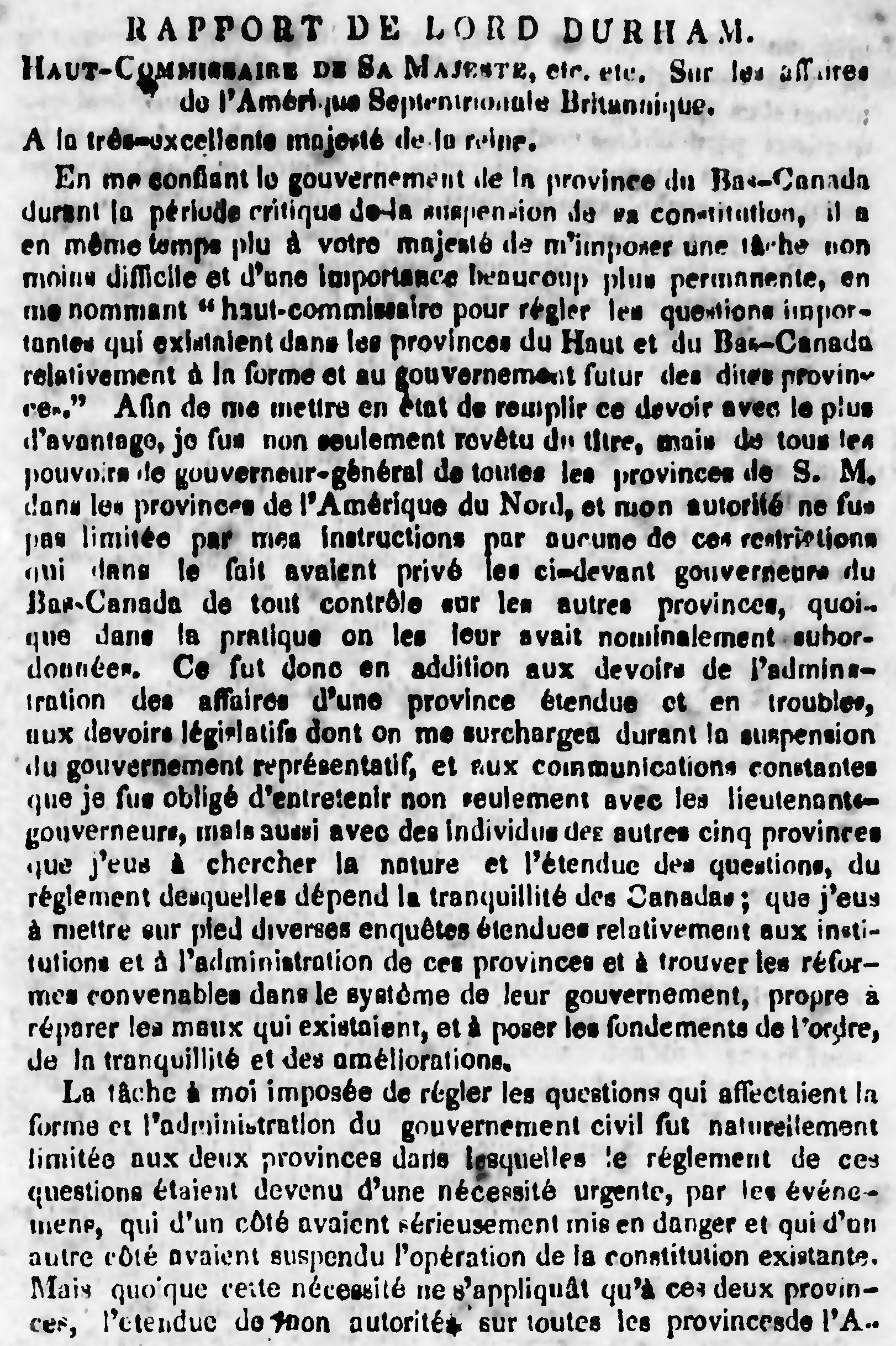
Lord Durham's Report

He was a supporter of Papineau and member of the Parti canadien (later the Parti patriote). After the severe consequences of the Rebellions of 1837 against the British authorities, he advocated political reforms within the new Union regime of 1841.

Under this Union of the two Canadas he worked with Robert Baldwin in the formation of a party of Upper and Lower Canadian liberal reformers. He and Baldwin formed a government in 1842 but resigned in 1843. In 1848 he was asked by the Governor-General, Lord Elgin, to form the first administration under the new policy of responsible government. The La Fontaine-Baldwin government, formed on March 11, battled for the restoration of the official status of the French language, which was abolished with the Union Act, and the principles of responsible government and the double-majority in the voting of bills.

While Baldwin was reforming Canada West (Upper Canada), La Fontaine passed bills to abolish the tenure seigneuriale (seigneurial system) and grant amnesty to the leaders of the rebellions in Lower Canada who had been exiled. The bill passed, but it was not accepted by the loyalists of Canada East who rioted and burned down the Parliament in Montreal.

Following the rebellion in Lower Canada, and the similar rebellion in 1837 in Upper Canada (now Ontario), the British government decided to merge the two provinces into a single province, as recommended by Lord Durham in the Durham Report. The Union Act, 1840, passed by the British Parliament, abolished the two provinces and their separate parliaments. It created the Province of Canada, with a single Parliament for the entire province, composed of an elected Legislative Assembly and an appointed Legislative Council. The Governor General initially retained a strong position in the government.

LaFontaine had been a member of the Parti patriote and a supporter of Louis-Joseph Papineau leading up to the Rebellion, but after the Rebellion failed he re-examined his political views. He decided to switch to a system of working within the existing constitutional order to achieve the political rights of French-Canadians. He adopted the cause of responsible government, where the Governor General would appoint the members of the Executive Council from the groups which controlled a majority in the elected Legislative Assembly. Anticipating that he would stand for election in the riding of Terrebonne, with a large majority population of French-Canadians, LaFontaine set out his new political approach in an Address to the Electors of Terrebonne.

At that time, it was not uncommon for there to be election violence. Voting was by open-ballot, where each voter publicly declared their vote at the poll. One common tactic was for the supporters of one candidate to try to control the poll and prevent the voters for the other candidate from voting. In the run-up to the Terrebonne election in March 1841, LaFontaine began to hear rumours that Sydenham and the supporters for the government candidate, Michael McCulloch, planned to bring in large numbers of men from outside the riding to control the poll and prevent his supporters from voting. One of LaFontaine's supporters wrote to him and suggested that they could hold the poll, if he was able to organise one thousand men to support his position.

External videos
- "Baldwin & LaFontaine" – Historica Canada. - Heritage Minutes (1:01 min)

One of the English-language newspapers in Montreal expressly stated that the goal was to prevent French-Canadians from voting in the poll:

From the known character of the majority of the electors in Terrebonne, we doubt not that LaFontaine would be returned if all the voters were polled; but it must be the duty of the loyalists to muster in their strength and keep the poll!"

The poll was located at New Glasgow, one of the few towns in the riding with an English-speaking majority, and located on the outskirts of the riding, away from the major population centres. The day of the election, LaFontaine led a group of his supporters in a march to New Glasgow, where they would vote. Fearing violence, many of them were armed with clubs and pitchforks, which was not uncommon in contested elections. As they neared New Glasgow, they found the road blocked by groups of men supporting McCulloch, perhaps six or seven hundred in total. They too were armed, many with clubs, but some with firearms. Small fights began to break out, and there was blood on the snow. LaFontaine, fearing for the safety of his supporters, abandoned the march to New Glasgow. Since only McCulloch's supporters voted for him, the returning officer declared McCulloch the elected candidate.

At first, LaFontaine thought there was no point in continuing in politics and announced his retirement from public life. But then a surprising event occurred. Robert Baldwin, a leading Reformer in Canada West, contacted LaFontaine. Following the elections in Canada West, there was a vacant seat, York 4th, where Baldwin had been elected as a Reformer but had resigned. Baldwin offered to nominate LaFontaine as the candidate for the riding in the upcoming by-election, with the support of the local Reform party members. Before making the offer to LaFontaine, Baldwin had obtained the agreement of David Willson, leader of the Children of Peace, a Quaker religious group that was made up of strong Reformers, and Willson had agreed.

LaFontaine gratefully accepted the offer, and with the support of Baldwin and the local Reformers, was elected in the by-election. The concept of a French-Canadian winning a seat in Canada West was remarkable. It was a strong indicator to French-Canadians that they had allies in their quest for popular control of the provincial government. A leading French-Canadian journalist and political writer, Étienne Parent, had accompanied LaFontaine to Canada West and reported back on their reception by West Canada reformers: "Ils élisent M. Lafontaine pour montrer, disent-ils, leur sympathie envers les Bas-Canadiens, et leur détestation des mauvais traitements et des injustices auxquelles nous avons été exposés." (Note: "They elect M. Lafontaine to show, they say, their sympathy towards Lower Canadians, and their detestation of the bad treatment and injustices to which we have been exposed.")

The episode was the beginning of the alliance between reformers in Canada East and Canada West that LaFontaine had argued for in his Address to the Electors.

Baldwin also insisted that Sydenham include La Fontaine in the reformed Executive Council, or he would resign as Solicitor General. Their alliance allowed La Fontaine to have a seat in the assembly in 1841 and for Baldwin to win the by-election in 1843.

During the 1840s, Willson continued his association with the Reform Party; he was, for example, the campaign manager in the area for both Robert Baldwin and LaFontaine, the "Fathers of Responsible Government" and first elected premiers of the province. It was the Children of Peace who ensured the election of Montreal lawyer Louis La Fontaine as their representative in Upper Canada. Willson argued that this was an opportunity, as he said, "to show our impartial respect to the Canadian people of the Lower province." Here, Willson is expressing a clear Canadian identity that overcame differences in the language and religion. It was a vision of Canadian citizenship that was ultimately successful, as La Fontaine was elected in the 4th Riding of York. Subsequently, they elected Baldwin in their riding. The band of the Children of Peace was a familiar sight at Baldwin's campaign rallies. In 1844, they held a campaign rally for Baldwin concurrently with the illumination of the Temple. Over 3000 people attended, an event that helped end the reign of Orange Order electoral violence.

On 3 September 1841, the Children of Peace held a campaign rally for Baldwin and La Fontaine in their Temple, where they rejoiced "to say that we have it in our power to show our impartial respect to the Canadian people of the Lower Province." Despite threats of Orange Order violence, La Fontaine was elected as representative of 4th York.

However, before La Fontaine could take up his seat, Governor Sydenham died. His replacement, Sir Charles Bagot, was not able to form a mixed cabinet of Reformers and Tories, and so he was forced to include the "Canadien party" under La Fontaine. La Fontaine refused to join the Executive Council unless Baldwin was also included. Bagot was finally forced to accede in September, 1842, and when he became severely ill thereafter, Baldwin and La Fontaine became the first real premiers of the Province of Canada. However, in order to take office as ministers, the two had to run for re-election. While La Fontaine was easily re-elected in 4th York, Baldwin lost his seat in Hastings as a result of Orange Order violence. It was now that the pact between the two men was completely solidified, as La Fontaine arranged for Baldwin to run in Rimouski, Canada East. This was the union of the Canadas they sought, where La Fontaine overcame linguistic prejudice to gain a seat in English Canada, and Baldwin obtained his seat in French Canada.

== Later life and death ==
La Fontaine retired to private life in 1851 but was appointed Chief Justice of Canada East in 1853. In 1854 he was created a baronet by Queen Victoria and a knight commander in the pontifical Order of St. Sylvester by Pope Pius IX in 1855. Lafontaine died on February 26, 1864. He was buried at Notre-Dame-des-Neiges Cemetery in Montreal.

== Personal life ==
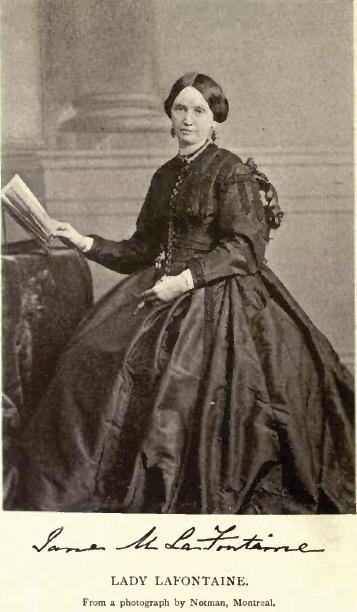
Jane Élisabeth Geneviève, Lady Lafontaine, by Notman

He first married on July 9, 1831, to Adèle Berthelot (1813–1859). Their union produced no children. His real family name is Ménard, the son of Antoine Ménard. The Hon. Sir Louis Hypolite Ménard, Bart., then Chief Justice of Lower Canada then married Montreal, January 30, 1861, the widowed Jane Élisabeth Geneviève Morrison, (1822–1905) daughter of Charles Morrison, on January 30, 1861. Julie had married in Montreal, December 18, 1848, Thomas Kinton, of the Royal Engineers Department. This second marriage produced two sons who died in infancy; Louis-Hippolyte (born July 11, 1862) and Charles François Hypolite Lafontaine, born April 13, 1864, who died the following year. The elder son succeeded to the baronetcy at eighteen months old in February, 1864, but died in 1867. The family residence was Saint Denis Street, Montreal.

== Legacy ==
=== The Louis Hippolyte Ménard Monument in La Fontaine Park Montreal ===
The city authorities of Montreal named Louis-Hippolyte La Fontaine park as a tribute to Chief Justice Lafontaine's memory. The unveiling of the La Fontaine Monument in Parc La Fontaine Montreal was a tremendous event to honour such a great man, who is considered the father of responsible Government in Canada. In a book published by Le Comité Du Monument LaFontaine in 1930 titled Hommage à LaFontaine. The book is a compilation of letters sent to various people about the unveiling of the monument in Montreal. In these letters and speeches, people expressed their sentiments about the unveiling of the LaFontaine Monument and it is clear they saw him as a great man. Mayor. C.Houde explained how "après que S.H le lieutenant-gouverneur Carroll, aux sons de l'hymne nationale rendu par la fanfare des Carabinies Mont-Royal, eut fait tomber le voile qui revouvrait la statutie La Fontaine.". The crowd was extremely large at the unveiling and Mayor. Houde explained how the monument was erected "à la mémoire de sir Louis Hippolyte Lafontaine, père du governement responsable au Canada". The Chief Justice for Sir Wilfrid Laurier was also present the day of the unveiling and he spoke very highly of the monument and LaFontaine as he said "It is a grateful joy to be allowed to laud and magnify LaFontaine's imperishable name. I would fain do it, excluding in a rise of Canada from colonial inferiority to international equality, wherein La Fontaine bore so great a part.

=== The Louis Hippolyte Ménard Monument in Boucherville ===
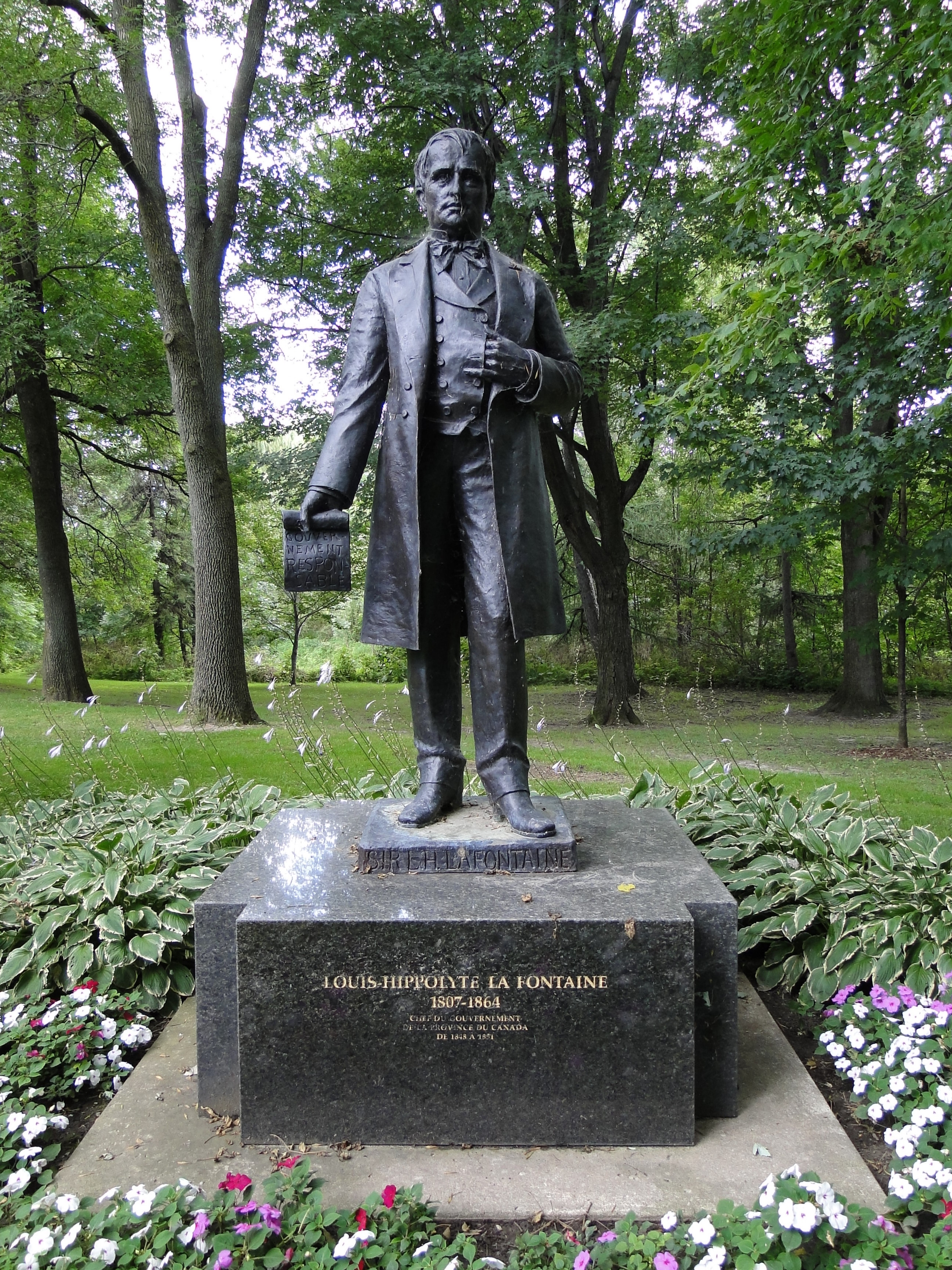
Monument of Louis-Hippolyte LaFontaine in Boucherville

La Fontaine was born in Boucherville and moved to Montreal to begin his political career. A monument was unveiled in Boucherville after his demise as well as a commemorative plaque, placed upon his birth home. Evidence of this is given by Dr. Eudore Dubeau a doctor of the town who explained, "en présence d'une foule estimée à dix mille personnes, parmi lesquelle on comptait les sommités religieuse ete civiles, nous inaugurions le monument de sir Louis Hippolyte LaFontaine.". He goes further to explain how on La Fontaine's birth home they placed a bronze plaque which "portant l'inscription comme sure son monument de "Père du governement responsable" et "Défenseur de la langue français.". Once again he is referenced as not only the father of responsible government, but also the defender of the French language. LaFontaine refused to speak English in the Assembly and fought to use his mother tongue. It was not that he was incapable of speaking English, he just believed people should be able to speak their mother tongue and supported the French Canadians right to do so.

=== The Louis-Hippolyte-La Fontaine Bridge-Tunnel ===
More about the Louis-Hippolyte LaFontaine Tunnel, a highway bridge–tunnel running over and beneath the Saint Lawrence River connecting Montreal to the south shore of the river at Longueuil, Quebec, can be found here. In brief construction began in 1963 and they named it after LaFontaine in order to preserve his memory for future generations.

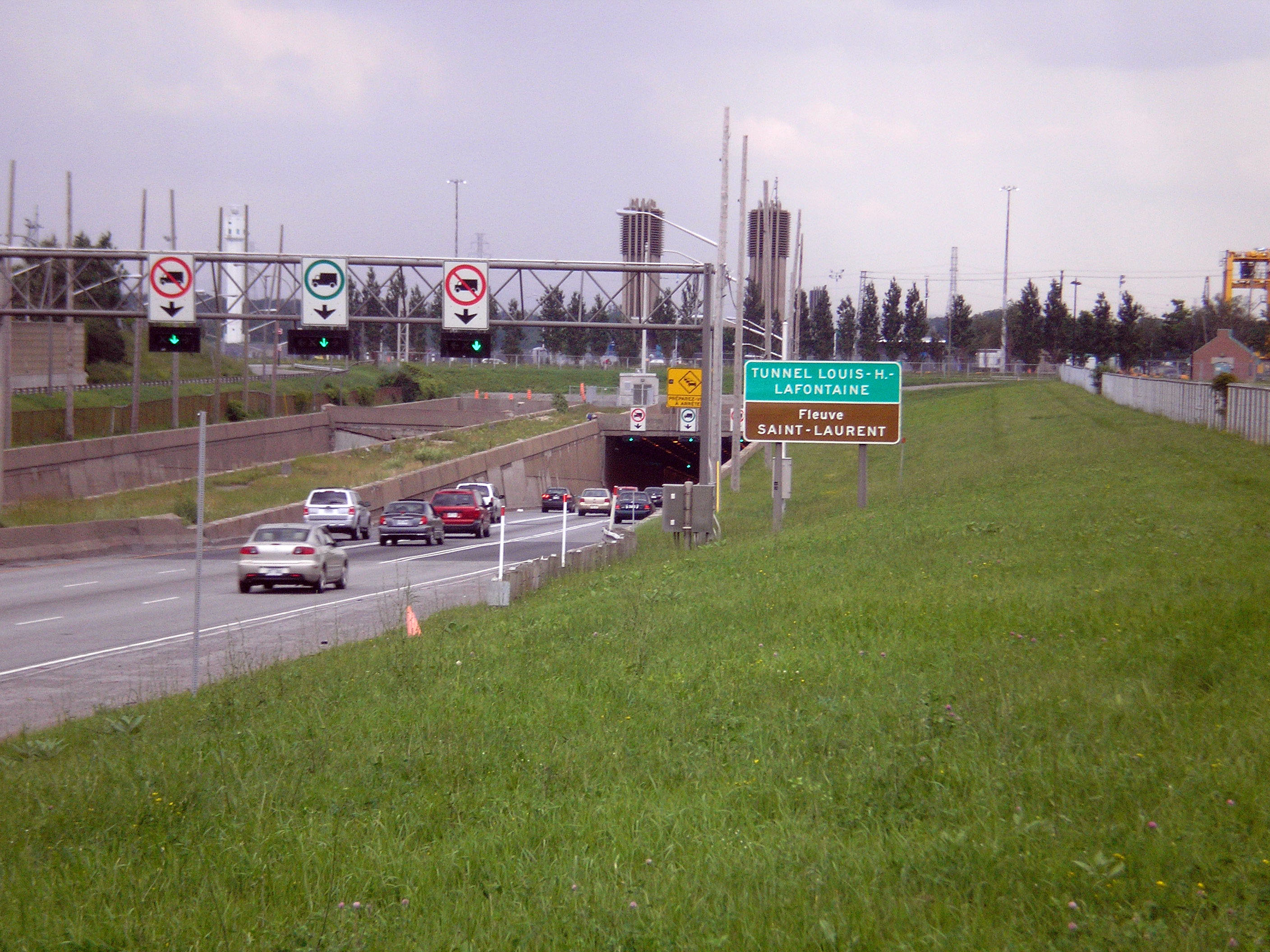
The LaFontaine Tunnel

=== Louis-Hippolyte Ménard Hospital ===
The Louis-Hippolyte-La Fontaine Hospital opened its doors in 1873 under the name "d'Hospice Saint-Jean-De-Dieu...La congrégation des Soeurs de la Providence". It was and still is a psychiatric hospital, although it speculated that they also took care of orphans who they wrongly labeled as mentally ill to conduct medical experiments, they are called the Duplessis Orphans. The name was changed because of letters from patients, although the reason they chose La Fontaine's name over others is not documented.

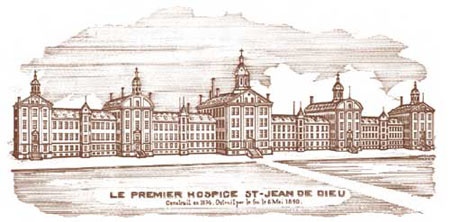
The Former Home of Louis-Hippolyte LaFontaine in Montreal

==== The Baldwin and La Fontaine Monument on Parliament Hill ====
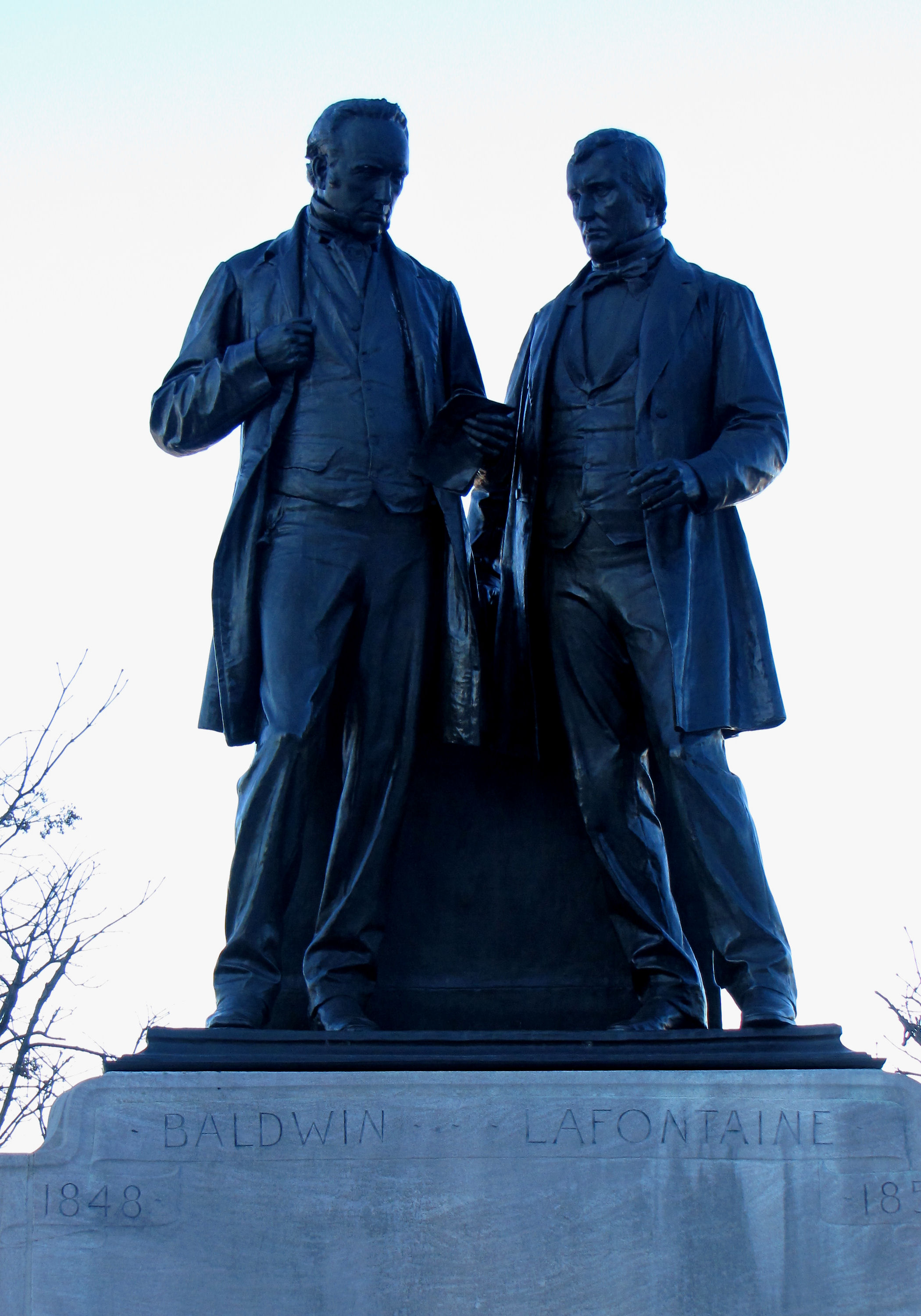
Monument of Robert Baldwin and Louis-Hippolyte LaFontaine in Ottawa

Created by Walter Seymour Allward who is best known for his design of the "mammoth Canadian Battlefields Memorial in Vimy, France (1922–36), that commemorated the important battle of Vimy Ridge." Allward created the statue of La Fontaine and Baldwin which rests on Parliament Hill in Ottawa. The "La Fontaine-Baldwin administration throughout the years 1849 and 1850 remained in a position of exceptional power". Under this regime La Fontaine fought to see the seigneurial system "abolished, but wished to find means to respect the interests of the seigniors by a proper compensation". Baldwin and La Fontaine fought hard to build unity in the government of Canada and build a true responsible government. If you would like to learn more about Baldwin and La Fontaine a Canadian Historical minute has been made concerning their rise into leadership which can be viewed at Baldwin and La Fontaine Historical Minute.

=== Awaiting Designations ===
The house Louis-Hippolyte La Fontaine lived in as a politician in Montreal is still standing today and is located on 1395 Overdale, Montreal, Quebec. However, the City of Montreal has not yet designated the building into a historical site. It was discovered in July 1987 by Senator Serge Joyal that this home was once the former home of Louis Hippolyte La Fontaine. During the Rebellion for the Losses Bill in which Parliament was burned this home was also the target of many rioters. Since it was rediscovered in 1987 its facade has been left to be battered by the elements. Heritage Montreal has been lobbying for the Sir Louis-Hippolyte LaFontaine House for many years and they are hoping that the City comes forward to help. Heritage Montreal and other advocates hope this home can be renovated and built into something such as an interpretive museum exploring the development of responsible government in Canada.

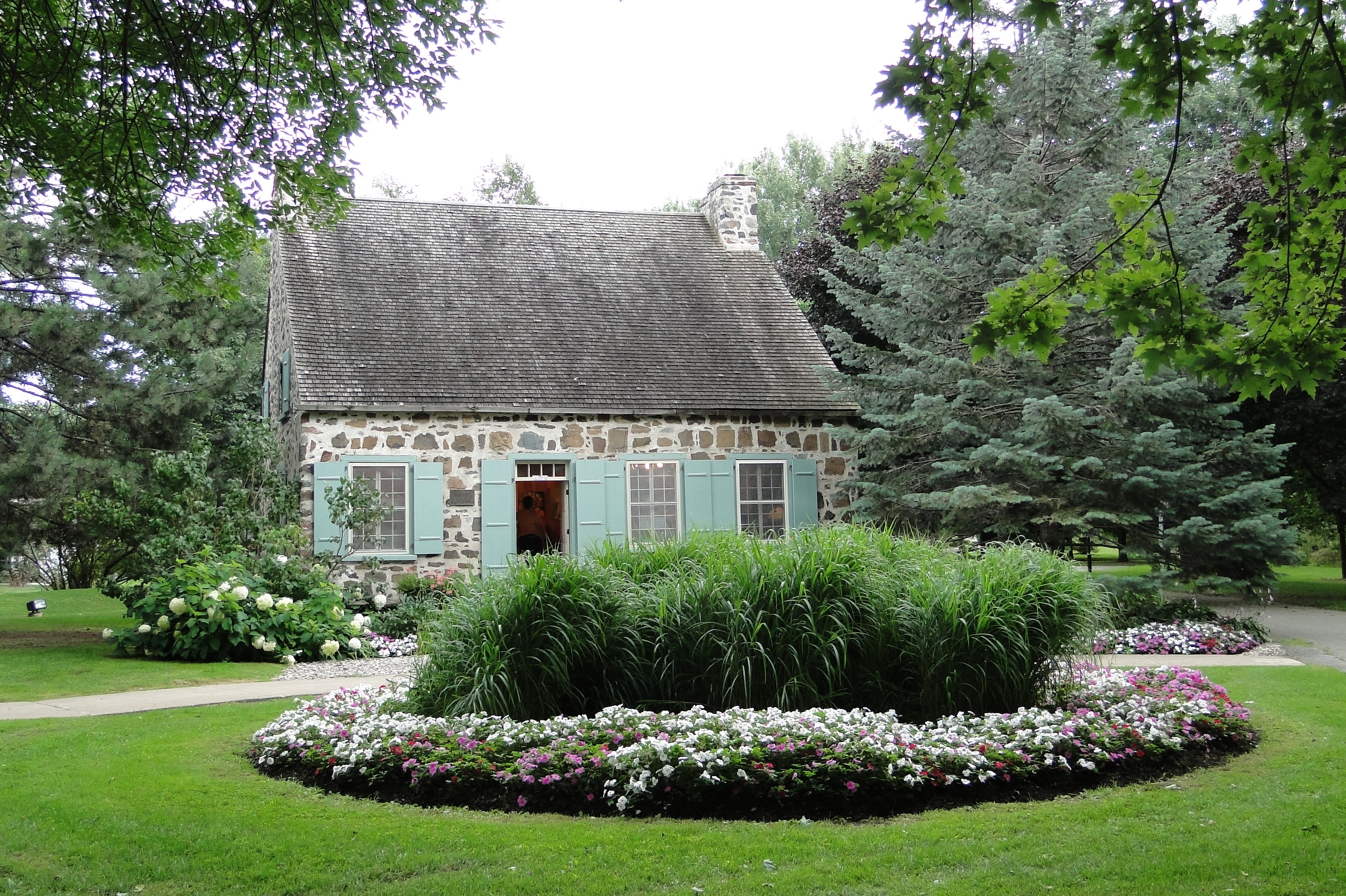
Louis-Hippolyte Lafontaine House (Boucherville)

== Arms ==
Coat of arms of Sir Louis-Hippolyte La Fontaine
Crest Upon a rock a stone fountain proper Escutcheon Azure a fess Argent charged with an open book surmounting a sword bendwise proper between two maple leaves Vert, all between in chief a cubit arm fesswise proper vested cuffed and holding a pair of scales Argent and in base a beaver couchant proper on a mount Vert Motto FONS ET ORIGO (Latin for 'The source and the origin') Orders Order of St Michael and St George: AUSPICIUM MELIORIS ÆVI (Latin for 'Token of a Better Age'); Order of St. Sylvester Other elements Red Hand of Ulster baronet badge

== Writings ==
=== Works ===
- Les deux girouettes, ou l'hypocrisie démasquée, Montréal, 1834 (online)
- Notes sur l'inamovibilité des curés dans le Bas-Canada, Montréal, 1837
- Analyse de l'ordonnance du Conseil spécial sur les bureaux d'hypothèques [...], Montréal, 1842
- De l'esclavage en Canada, Montréal, 1859 (online)
- De la famille des Lauson. Vice-rois et lieutenants généraux des rois de France en Amérique, 1859 (online)

=== Other ===
- The Address to the Electors of Terrebonne, 1840 (online)

== See also ==
- Canadian peers and baronets
- LaFontaine-Baldwin Symposium
- Louis-Joseph Papineau
- Lower Canada Rebellion
- Timeline of Quebec history

== Bibliography ==
=== In English ===
- Abbott Nish, M. E. Double majority: Concept, Practice and Negotiations, 1840–1848, Master Thesis, McGill University, Montréal, 1966
- Doughty, Arthur George (1911). "LaFontaine, Sir Louis Hippolyte" . Encyclopædia Britannica. Vol. 16 (11th ed.). p. 71.
- Leacock, Stephen (1907). Baldwin, Lafontaine, Hincks: responsible government. Makers of Canada. London: T.C & E.C. Jack.
- Heritage Montreal, "Louis-Hippolyte LaFontaine Mansion", Montreal, https://web.archive.org/web/20110203084745/http://www.heritagemontreal.org/en/louis-hippolyte-lafontaine-mansion/.
- Marsh, James H. (February 9, 2016) [January 24, 2012]. "The Friendship that Brought Responsible Government". The Canadian Encyclopedia (online ed.). Historica Canada.
- Monet, Jacques (1976). "Lafontaine, Sir Louis-Hippolyte". In Halpenny, Francess G. (ed.). Dictionary of Canadian Biography. Vol. IX (1861–1870) (online ed.). University of Toronto Press.
- Saul, John Ralston. Louis-Hippolyte LaFontaine and Robert Baldwin (2010) online
- "La Fontaine, Louis Hippolyte" . Encyclopedia Americana. 1920.

=== In French ===
- Aubin, Georges (2002–05). Louis-Hippolyte La Fontaine. Correspondance générale
  - Tome 1: Les ficelles du pouvoir: correspondance entre Louis-Hippolyte La Fontaine et Robert Baldwin, 1840–1854
  - Tome 2: Au nom de la loi: lettres de Louis-Hippolyte La Fontaine à divers correspondants, 1829–1847
  - Tome 3: Mon cher Amable: lettres de Louis-Hippolyte La Fontaine à divers correspondants, 1848–1864
- Aubin, Georges (1999). Louis-Hippolyte La Fontaine. Journal de voyage en Europe, 1837–1838, Sillery: Septentrion, 153 p. ISBN 2-89448-142-X
- Bertrand, Réal (1993). Louis-Hippolyte LaFontaine, Montréal: Lidec, 60 p. ISBN 2-7608-7046-4
- Auclair, Elie-Joseph (1933). Figures canadiennes, Montréal, vol. 2, pp. 9–19 (online)
- DeCelles, Alfred Duclos, LaFontaine et son temps, Montréal: Librairie Beauchemin,192g.(online)
- Laurent-Olivier David (1872). Sir Ls.-H. Lafontaine, Montréal: Typographie Geo. E. Desbarats, 45 p.
- Fauteaux, M Aegidius. Hommages à LaFontaine. Montreal" le Comité Du Monument LaFontaine, 1931.
- A Propos. "Historique".Hôpital Louis-Hippolye LaFontaine, Montreal:(accessed Feb 2011)
- "Biography of Louis-Hippolyte LaFontaine". Dictionnaire des parlementaires du Québec de 1792 à nos jours (in French). National Assembly of Quebec.

https://web.archive.org/web/20110202081420/http://www.hlhl.qc.ca/hopital/portrait/historique.html.

Political offices
Preceded by Charles Richard Ogden	Joint Premiers of the Province of Canada - Canada East; 1842–1843	Succeeded by with Sir Dominick Daly
Preceded by Denis-Benjamin Papineau	Premiers of Canada East; 1848–1851	Succeeded by Augustin-Norbert Morin
Baronetage of the United Kingdom
New creation	Baronet (of the City of Montreal); 1854–1864	Succeeded by Louis-Hippolyte Lafontaine
