= Denis-Émery Papineau =

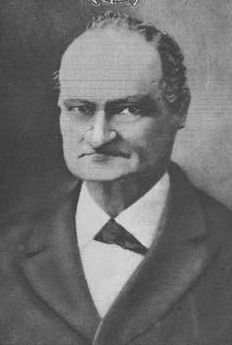
Denis-Émery Papineau

Denis-Émery Papineau (December 26, 1819 – January 6, 1899) was a Quebec notary and political figure.

Papineau was born in 1819 in Montreal, he was the son of Denis-Benjamin Papineau, who was the joint-premier of the Province of Canada for Eastern Canada from 1846 to 1848. Papineau was schooled at Saint-Hyacinthe, and received his qualification as a notary in 1841, following which he entered into practice in Montreal. In 1843, he became the notary for the city of Montreal. Papineau was one of the founders of Revue canadienne, and the newspapers L'Avenir and Le Pays. He worked with others to establish the Banque Ville-Marie and became its first president. He was a member of the Montreal Annexation Association that sought annexation to the United States. He became a vice-president for the organization. Papineau was elected to the Legislative Assembly of the Province of Canada for Ottawa County in 1858. Papineau worked to establish a notary provincial association and he was its president from 1876 to 1879. In 1899, he died in Montreal (although some sources say 1898). Papineau was buried in the Notre-Dame-des-Neiges Cemetery.
