= Côme-Séraphin Cherrier (Lower Canada politician) =

Canadian politician (1798–1885)

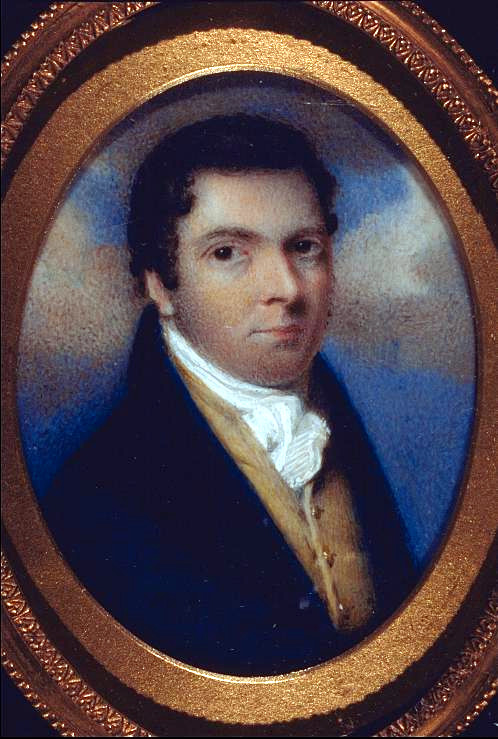
Côme-Séraphin Cherrier.

Côme-Séraphin Cherrier (July 22, 1798 – April 10, 1885) was a lawyer and political figure in Lower Canada.

He was born in Repentigny in 1798, the son of a farmer and merchant. After his mother died in 1801, he was raised by the family of his uncle Denis Viger. Another uncle was Joseph Papineau. Cherrier studied at the Petit Séminaire de Montréal, articled in law with his cousin Denis-Benjamin Viger and was called to the bar in 1822. His partners in law included Louis-Michel Viger, Denis-Aristide Laberge, Charles-Elzéar Mondelet, Antoine-Aimé Dorion and Vincislas-Paul-Wilfrid Dorion. Cherrier successfully defended Jocelyn Waller against accusations of having libelled the administration of Lord Dalhousie. He also represented the seigneurs during the process of establishing compensation when seigneurial tenure was abolished. He married Mélanie, the daughter of merchant Joseph Quesnel and widow of merchant Michel Coursol, in 1833. In 1834, Cherrier was elected to the Legislative Assembly of Lower Canada for Montreal County and supported the parti patriote. Although Cherrier did not support armed resistance, he was arrested in December 1837; he was later put under house arrest after he became ill.

In 1842, he was named Queen's Counsel. He was bâtonnier for the Montreal bar in 1855 and 1856 and was dean for the law faculty of the Université Laval at Montreal. Cherrier became president of the Saint-Jean-Baptiste Society of Montreal in 1853. He ran unsuccessfully for the position of mayor of Montreal in 1859. In 1865, he gave a speech to the Institut canadien-français opposing Confederation. He was named a knight in the Order of St Gregory the Great in 1869. Cherrier was also a vice-president of the St Vincent de Paul Society at Montreal. He owned much property at Montreal and inherited property from Denis-Benjamin Viger in Montreal and Île-Bizard. He served as director and later president for La Banque du Peuple.

After his death in 1885, he was entombed at the Notre Dame des Neiges Cemetery in Montreal.

His uncles Benjamin-Hyacinthe-Martin Cherrier and Séraphin Cherrier both served as members of the assembly.
