= Joseph Papineau =

Canadian politician

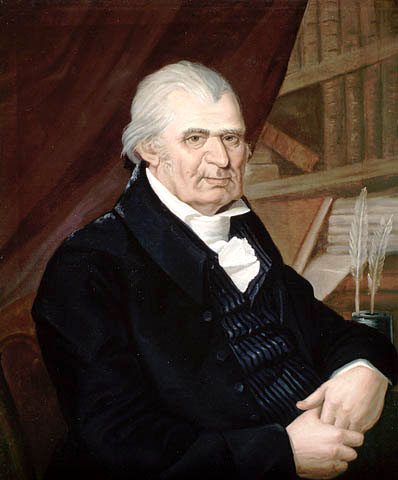
Portrait of Joseph Papineau, 1825

Joseph Papineau (French pronunciation: [ʒozɛf papino]; October 16, 1752 – July 8, 1841) was a notary, seigneur, and political figure in Lower Canada.

Between 1773 and 1775, he worked as a surveyor. Papineau was also a horticulturalist whose estate home at Montebello is a tourist attraction to this day in the province of Québec, Canada. His own contributions to the culture and history of this particular province are recognized to this day with streets, squares, and monuments being dedicated to his memory. A historical marker is located at his former house on Rue Bonsecours in Ville-Marie. The marker text states: "Joseph Papineau (1752 - 1841), notary and deputy, lived in this house. His son Louis-Joseph Papineau (1786-1871), lawyer, statesman and leader of the uprising of 1837, also lived there as well as his descendants."

Joseph Papineau was the father of Louis-Joseph Papineau who had the great distinction of being a fiery player in the history of the French dominated British colony called Lower Canada. His other son, Denis-Benjamin, also played a significant though lesser role in politics of Canada East, serving as joint premier in the Legislative Assembly.

His son Louis-Joseph was even more influential in creating a strong Québec identity due to his political activities. The involvement of Louis-Joseph Papineau and Ezekiel Hart is responsible for Jews being granted full citizen rights in any territory or nation several decades before many other countries followed suit. This may be among his most important contribution to pre-Confederation Canadian history. (The first Jewish synagogues had opened in Montreal after the British Conquest of 1760.)
