= Jean Chabot =

Lawyer, politician and judge in Canada East (1806–1860)

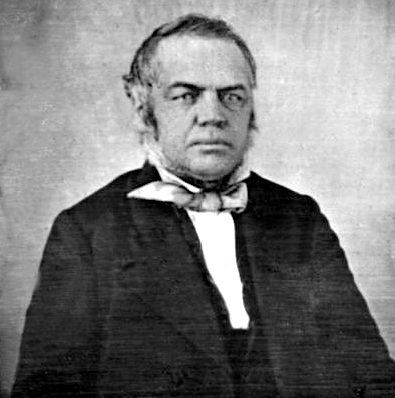

Chief Commissioner of Public Works, Province of Canada
- In office December 13, 1849–March 30, 1850
- Preceded by: Étienne-Paschal Taché
- Succeeded by: William Hamilton Merritt
- In office September 23, 1851–January 26, 1855
- Preceded by: John Young
- Succeeded by: François-Xavier Lemieux

Government Director – Grand Trunk Railway
- In office November 20, 1852–September 19, 1856

Member of the Legislative Assembly of the Province of Canada for Quebec City
- In office 1843 – 1851; Two by-elections and two general elections Serving with Henry Black (1843–1844); Thomas Cushing Aylwin (1844–1851)
- Preceded by: David Burnet
- Succeeded by: George Okill Stuart Jr.

Member of the Legislative Assembly for the Province of Canada for Bellechasse
- In office 1851–1854 (one general election and one by-election)
- Preceded by: Augustin-Norbert Morin
- Succeeded by: Octave-Cyrille Fortier

Member of the Legislative Assembly of the Province of Canada for Quebec City
- In office 1854–1856 Serving with Jean Blanchet; Georges-Honoré Simard
- Preceded by: George Okill Stuart Jr.

Judge of the Superior Court of Lower Canada
- In office 1856–1860

Personal details
- Born: October 15, 1806 Saint-Charles, Lower Canada
- Died: May 31, 1860 (aged 53) Quebec City, Canada East
- Resting place: Chapel of Ste-Anne, Cathedral-Basilica of Notre-Dame de Québec
- Party: French-Canadian Group (1843–1850); Ministerialists (1851–1856)
- Spouse: Hortense Hamel
- Education: Petite Séminaire de Québec
- Profession: Lawyer

Jean Chabot (October 15, 1806 – May 31, 1860) was a lawyer, political figure and judge from Canada East, in the Province of Canada. He supported Louis-Hippolyte LaFontaine's policy of responsible government within the framework of the union of Lower Canada and Upper Canada into the Province of Canada. Chabot served twice as Chief Commissioner of Public Works with a seat in the Executive Council.

In addition to his government work, Chabot worked hard to represent the interests of his constituents, with a particular emphasis on relieving poverty. He was one of the founders of the Society of Saint Vincent de Paul in Lower Canada.

Chabot was married but did not have children. He had a reputation as an alcoholic and at one point had to resign from the Executive Council due to an arrest for public drunkenness.

Chabot left politics in 1856 when he was appointed to the Superior Court of Montreal. He died in office in 1860, age 53.

== Early life and family ==
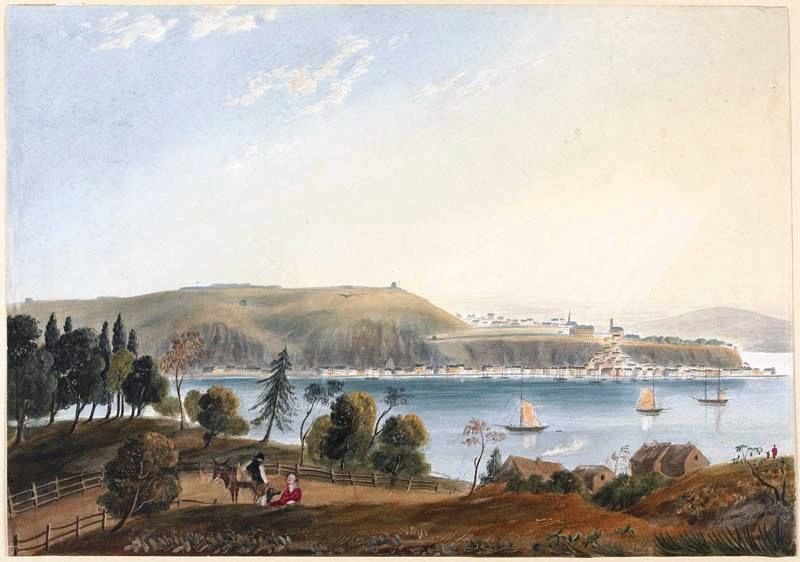
View of Quebec City from across the St. Lawrence

Chabot was born in Saint-Charles, Lower Canada, south of Quebec City, in 1806. His parents, Basile Chabot and Josephte Prévost, were a farm couple. He studied at the Petit Séminaire de Québec from 1820 to 1828, then articled in law with Elzéar Bédard, a prominent lawyer in Quebec. He was called to the bar in 1834. That same year, Chabot married Hortense Hamel at Quebec. The couple did not have any children. He advanced quickly at the bar, gaining a reputation as a very competent lawyer.

== Political career ==
=== Member of the Legislative Assembly (1843 to 1856) ===
He was elected by acclamation to the Legislative Assembly of the Province of Canada for Quebec City in a by-election in 1843 and was re-elected in 1844, again by acclamation. He was a supporter of Louis Hippolyte LaFontaine, the leader of the French-Canadian Group, who was campaigning for the introduction of responsible government. After the resignation of the Executive Councillors in November 1843, led by LaFontaine and Robert Baldwin, Chabot joined in the vote in favour of the resolution supporting the councillors and condemning Governor General Metcalfe for his conduct.

In the 1844 elections, LaFontaine, Baldwin and their supporters were in opposition. Chabot was a strong critic of the government, led by William Draper from Upper Canada, and Denis-Benjamin Viger from Lower Canada. Chabot was not known as a strong public speaker, but he was nonetheless effective in Parliament. He was recognised as a strong advocate for the interests of his constituents in Quebec City, particularly in seeking aid from the government after a series of significant fires in Quebec in May and June 1845. Nonetheless, in the run-up to the general elections in 1848, he gave a trenchant critique in the Assembly of the ineffective policies of the government.

In the 1848 elections, LaFontaine and Baldwin won a majority of the seats in the Assembly. LaFontaine was summoned by Governor General Lord Elgin to form a government. Chabot was re-elected in Quebec City, again by acclamation. He was not initially appointed to the Executive Council, but continued as a strong supporter of LaFontaine and his policies. One indication of his commitment to LaFontaine occurred in May 1848. Louis-Joseph Papineau, the popular leader of the Lower Canada Rebellion of 1837, had returned from exile and had been elected to the Assembly in the 1848 elections. Chabot chaired a public meeting in Quebec City to welcome Papineau on his return. As chair, Chabot made it clear that while he respected Papineau, he supported LaFontaine's policies of working within the Province of Canada, rather than try to seek to undo the union of the two Canadas, as Papineau wished.

In the general elections of December 1851, Chabot again stood for election, this time in the constituency of Bellechasse, which included his hometown of St Charles. He was elected, coming first out of four candidates. In the general elections of 1854, he stood for election in both Bellechasse and Quebec City, as was permitted at that time. He was elected in both, and chose to represent Quebec City. His election was challenged, but the challenge was dismissed by the Assembly.

Chabot resigned from Parliament in 1856, to take a judicial appointment.

=== Member of the Executive Council (1849–1850; 1852–1855) ===
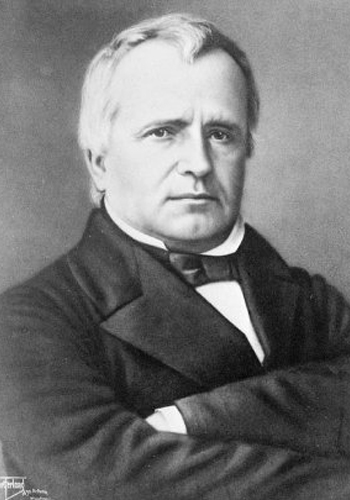
Louis-Hippolyte LaFontaine, who appointed Chabot to the Executive Council in 1849

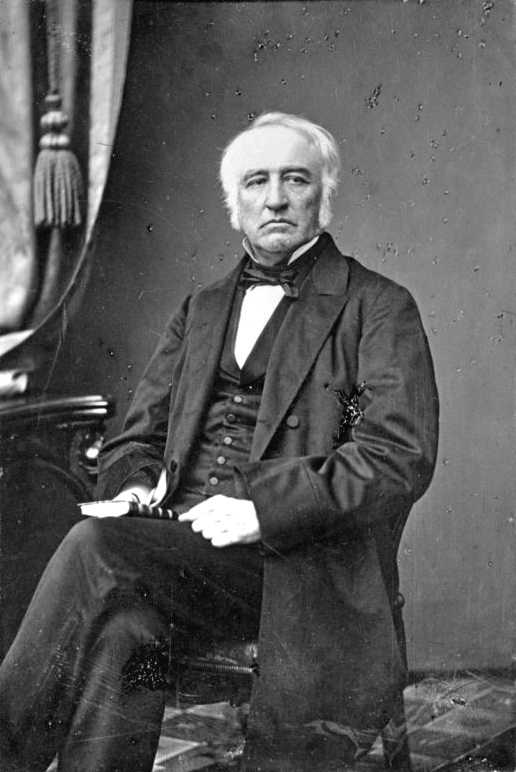
Augustin-Norbert Morin, who appointed Chabot to the Executive Council a second time, in 1852

In late 1849, there was a cabinet shuffle in the Executive Council. LaFontaine and Baldwin appointed Chabot as Chief Commissioner of Public Works. Chabot was appointed in part due to lobbying by his cousin, Charles-Félix Cazeau, an official at the Diocese of Quebec. However, LaFontaine and Baldwin were also cautioned by two of their supporters, Lewis Thomas Drummond and Joseph-Édouard Cauchon, that Chabot did not have the qualities necessary for the position, in particular because he had a reputation as a drunkard. As was required by the election law at that time, Chabot had to stand for re-election in his seat in the Assembly upon taking an office of profit under the Crown. In the resulting ministerial by-election, he was re-elected, defeating Joseph Légaré, who campaigned for the Rouges.

Chabot's initial term in office was short. In March 1850, when Parliament was sitting in Toronto, Chabot was arrested for public drunkenness and spent a night in jail. He resigned from the Executive Council, but retained his seat in the Assembly.

By 1851, LaFontaine and Baldwin had retired from politics. In the debate on the speech from the throne in the first session after the 1851 elections, Chabot indicated his continued support for the Reform coalition, now headed by Augustin-Norbert Morin and Francis Hincks, with the French-Canadian Group now being referred to as the Ministerialist group, indicating their support for the Morin-Hincks ministry. Chabot's interests were largely related to infrastructure: better roads, an intercolonial railway linking Quebec City to Halifax, and abolition of seigneurial system of land-holding. He also called for the reform or abolition of the appointed Legislative Council.

Chabot was not initially included in the ministry, but in September 1852, the incumbent Chief Commissioner of Public Works resigned. Hincks and Morin initially offered the position to George-Étienne Cartier, but he refused it. They then offered it to Chabot, who accepted it. He was also appointed one of the government's representatives on the board of directors of the Grand Trunk Railway. He again had to stand for re-election in a ministerial by-election, and again was returned to his seat.

The Hincks–Morin ministry was replaced in January 1855 by a new ministry headed by Sir Allan MacNab and Étienne-Paschal Taché. Chabot was dropped from the Executive Council and lost his position as Chief Commissioner of Public Works, but was continued as a government representative on the Grand Trunk. He was also appointed to the seigneurial tenure commission, with the task of drawing up the land registry of the plots of seigneurial land-holdings, an initial step in the abolition of seigneurial tenure.

== Charitable and commercial activities ==
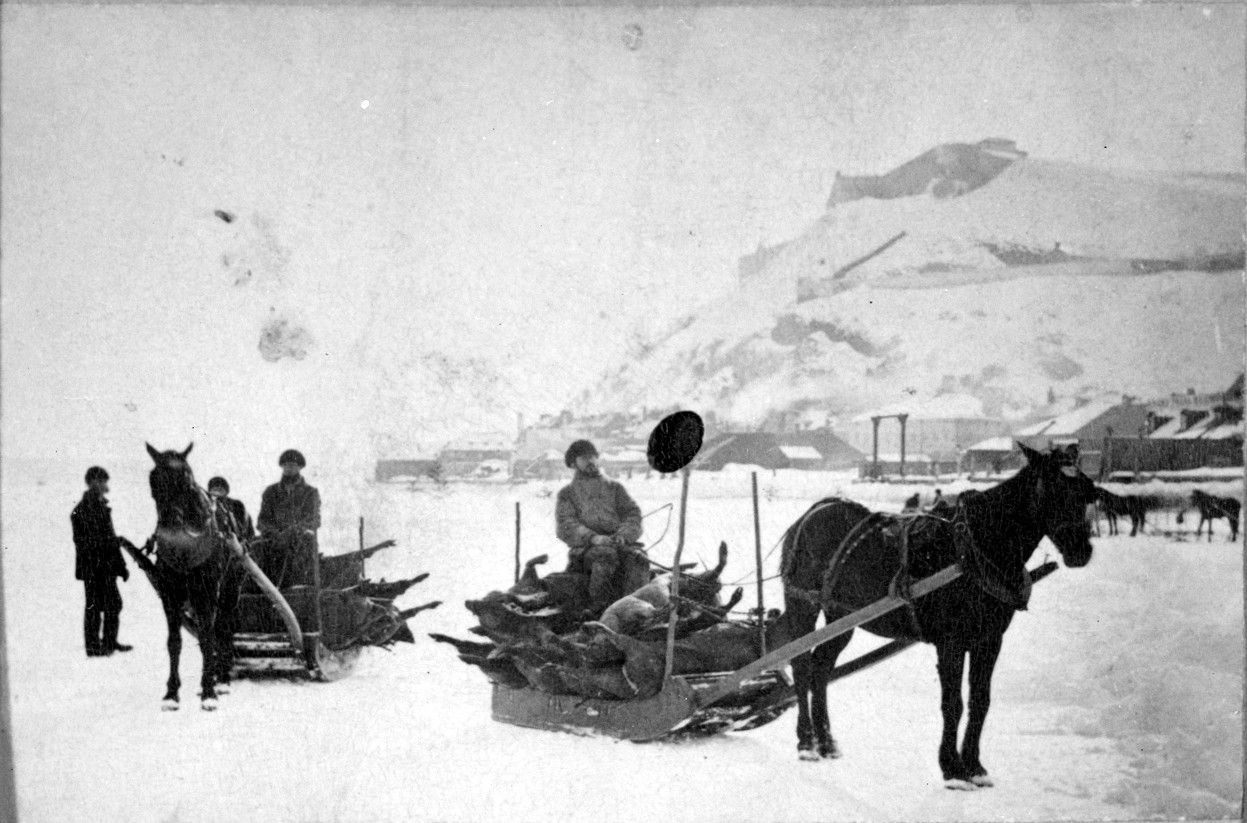
An ice bridge on the St. Lawrence

Chabot helped establish the Society of Saint Vincent de Paul in Quebec. In 1846, he was the chairman of the conference to set up the first branch of the society in the Province of Canada. The next year, he was chosen as the president of the Quebec council, a position he held until 1850.

Chabot also became interested in railway development. In 1850, he became a director of the Quebec and Melbourne Railway. In 1854, he was one of the signatories of a petition to the Assembly, calling for the construction of a Canadian railway to the Pacific Ocean. He also was involved in inquiries in the Assembly to build steam ferries to cross the St. Lawrence River at Quebec in the winter, rather than relying on ice bridges.

In 1854, Chabot was appointed Queen's Counsel.

== Later life and death ==
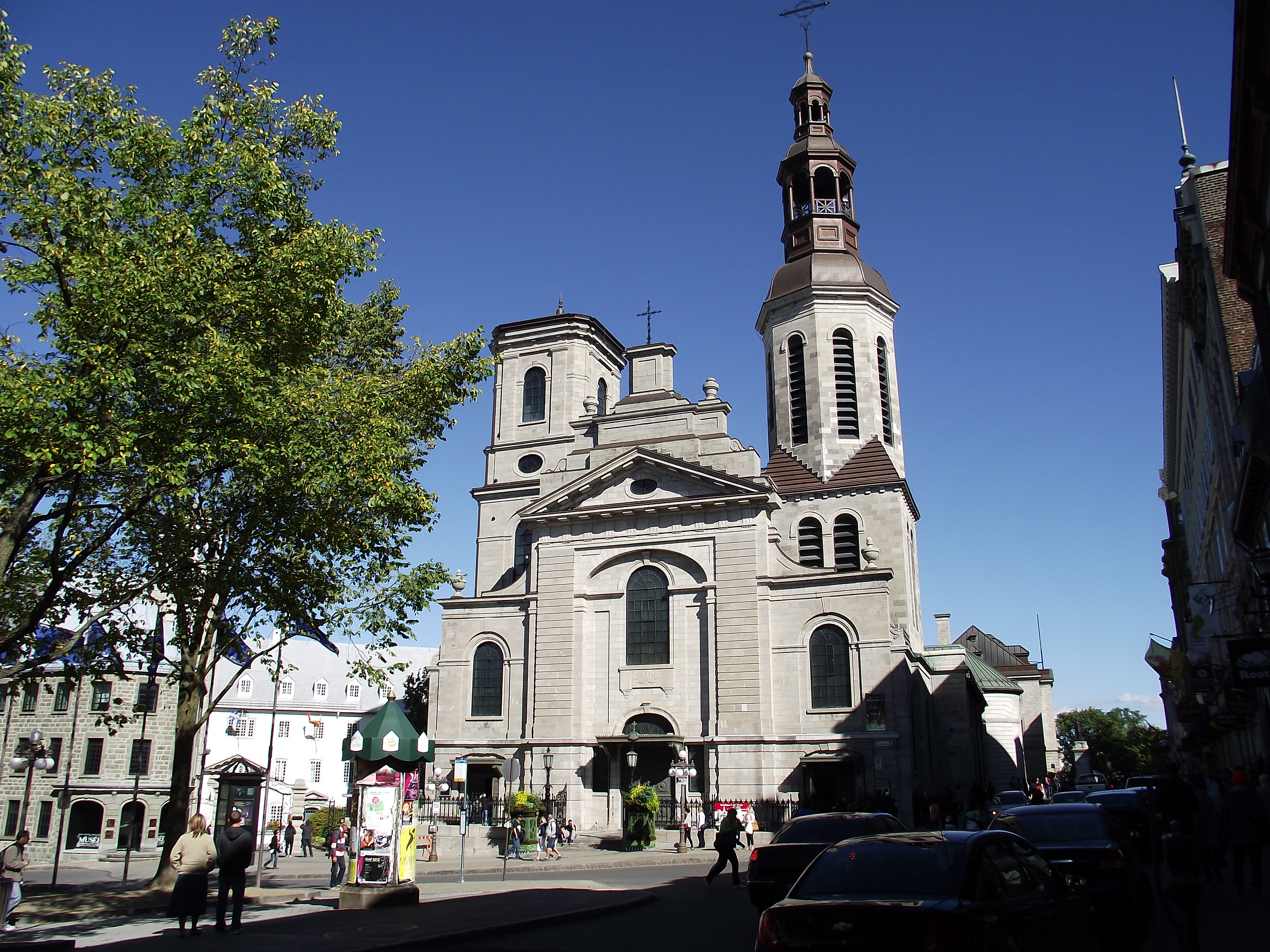
Notre-Dame de Quebec, where Chabot is interred

In 1856, he resigned from Parliament to accept an appointment as judge in the Superior Court at Montreal. In 1857 he was transferred to Quebec City. He died there in 1860. He was buried in the Chapel Ste-Anne in the Cathedral-Basilica of Notre-Dame de Québec.

== See also ==
- 1st Parliament of the Province of Canada
- 2nd Parliament of the Province of Canada
- 3rd Parliament of the Province of Canada
- 4th Parliament of the Province of Canada
- 5th Parliament of the Province of Canada
