= William Felton =

William Felton may refer to:

- William Felton (died 1367), seneschal of Poitou, killed in a skirmish in Spain while fighting for the Black Prince
- William Felton (coachmaker), 18th century London coachmaker, 36 Leather Lane, Holborn
- William Harrell Felton (1823–1909), American politician
- William Felton (composer)
- Billy Felton (1900–1977), English footballer
- William Bowman Felton (1782–1837), British naval officer and political figure
- William Locker Pickmore Felton (1812–1877), Canadian lawyer and politician

== See also ==
- William Felton Russell
