= Bellechasse (Province of Canada electoral district) =

Electoral district in former Province of Canada

Coordinates: 46°40′N 70°30′W

Bellechasse Canada East
Province of Canada electoral district

Defunct pre-Confederation electoral district
- Legislature: Legislative Assembly of the Province of Canada
- District created: 1841
- District abolished: 1867
- First contested: 1841
- Last contested: 1863

Bellechasse was an electoral district of the Legislative Assembly of the Parliament of the Province of Canada, in Canada East. It was created by the Union Act, 1840 in 1841, based on the previous electoral district of the same name for the Legislative Assembly of Lower Canada. It was located in the current Chaudière-Appalaches area.

Bellechasse was represented by one Member at the Legislative Assembly of the Province of Canada. It was abolished in 1867, upon the creation of Canada and the province of Quebec.

== Boundaries ==
In 1840 the British Parliament passed the Union Act, 1840, which merged the two provinces of Upper Canada and Lower Canada into the Province of Canada, with a single Parliament. The separate parliaments of Lower Canada and Upper Canada were abolished.

The Union Act provided that the pre-existing electoral boundaries of Lower Canada and Upper Canada would continue to be used in the new Parliament, unless altered by the Union Act itself. The Bellechasse electoral district of Lower Canada was not altered by the Act, and therefore continued with the same boundaries which had been set by a statute of Lower Canada in 1829:

The County of Bellechasse shall be bounded on the north east by the said County of L'Islet, on the south-west by the north-east boundary-lines of the Seigniories of Lauzon and Jolliet, and of the Townships of Frampton, Cranbourne and Watford, and thence by a line prolonged south east to the southern boundary of the Province, on the north west by the River Saint Lawrence, and include all the islands in the said River, nearest to the said County, and in the whole or part fronting the same, and in the south east by the southern boundary of the Province; which county so bounded comprises the Seigniories of Berthier, Saint Vallier, Saint Michel, Beaumont, and its augmentation, La Durantaye and its augmentation La Martiniere, Montapeine, Vincennes, Saint Gervais and Livandiere, and the Townships of Buckland and Standon.

The electoral district of Bellechasse thus included the County of Bellechasse (now part of the Bellechasse Regional County Municipality), and some adjacent areas. The elections were held at Saint Vallier and Saint Gervais.

== Members of the Legislative Assembly (1841–1867) ==
Bellechasse was a single-member constituency.

The following were the members of the Legislative Assembly for Bellechasse. The party affiliations are based on the biographies of individual members given by the National Assembly of Quebec, as well as votes in the Legislative Assembly. "Party" was a fluid concept, especially during the early years of the Province of Canada.

Parliament	Members	Years in Office	Party
1st Parliament; 1841-1844	Augustin-Guillaume Ruel (Note: Vacated his seat on being appointed Registrar of Rimouski district: Côté, Appointments and Elections, p. 59, note (3).)	1841–1842	Anti-unionist; French-Canadian Group
1st Parliament; 1841-1844	Abraham Turgeon (Note: Elected in by-election, June 6, 1842: Côté, Appointments and Elections, p. 59, note (4).)	1842–1844 (by-election)	French-Canadian Group
2nd Parliament; 1844–1847	Augustin-Norbert Morin	1844–1851	French-Canadian Group
3rd Parliament; 1848–1851	Augustin-Norbert Morin	1844–1851	French-Canadian Group
4th Parliament; 1851–1854	Jean Chabot	1851–1854	Ministerialist
5th Parliament; 1854–1857	Octave-Cyrille Fortier (Note: Jean Chabot was elected in the general election, but chose not to sit in Bellechasse; Fortier elected in by-election on October 17, 1854: Côté, Appointments and Elections, p. 62, note (160).)	1854–1861	Ministerialist
6th Parliament; 1858–1861	Octave-Cyrille Fortier	1854–1861	Bleu
7th Parliament; 1861–1863	Édouard Rémillard	1861–1867	Rouge
8th Parliament; 1863–1867	Édouard Rémillard	1861–1867	Confederation; Liberal

== Abolition ==
The district was abolished on July 1, 1867, when the British North America Act, 1867 came into force, splitting the Province of Canada into Quebec and Ontario. It was succeeded by electoral districts of the same name in the House of Commons of Canada and the Legislative Assembly of Quebec.

== See also ==
- List of elections in the Province of Canada
