= Quebec City (Province of Canada electoral district) =

Electoral district in former Province of Canada

Coordinates: 46.81039°N 71.22196°W

Quebec City Canada East
Province of Canada electoral district

Defunct pre-Confederation electoral district
- Legislature: Legislative Assembly of the Province of Canada
- District created: 1841
- District abolished: 1860
- First contested: 1841
- Last contested: 1858

Quebec City was an electoral district of the Legislative Assembly of the Parliament of the Province of Canada, in Canada East (now Quebec). It was created in 1841 and included much of Quebec City. Its boundaries were specifically drawn by the British Governor General, Lord Sydenham, to include voters of British background and to dilute the voting strength of francophone Canadien voters, an example of an ethnic and linguistic gerrymander. Sydenham's purpose was to gain support in the Legislative Assembly for the new Province of Canada, which had merged the formerly separate provinces of Lower Canada and Upper Canada, as well as for his government.

Twelve years later, in a redistribution of the electoral districts, the provincial Parliament re-drew the boundaries of the Quebec constituency, adopting the municipal boundaries of Quebec as the basis for the electoral district. The redistribution ended the Sydenham gerrymander.

Quebec City was a multi-member constituency. From 1841 to 1854, it was represented by two members in the Legislative Assembly. In 1854, an additional member was added, for a total of three members. The three-member constituency was abolished in 1861, when it was split into three single-member ridings.

== Boundaries ==
Quebec City electoral district covered much of the municipality of Quebec City, one of the largest centres in Canada East. However, portions of the municipality were carefully excised from the electoral district of Quebec City and added to the surrounding Quebec County electoral district, in furtherance of the Governor General's plan to increase the voting strength of British voters who would support his government.

The Union Act, 1840, passed by the British Parliament, merged the two provinces of Upper Canada and Lower Canada into the Province of Canada, with a single Parliament. The separate parliaments of Lower Canada and Upper Canada were abolished. The Union Act provided that the pre-existing electoral boundaries of Lower Canada and Upper Canada would continue to be used in the new Parliament, unless altered by the Union Act itself.

Quebec City was one of the electoral districts specifically defined by the Union Act. In the Legislative Assembly of Lower Canada, the municipality of Quebec had been included in the surrounding Quebec County, but had not been part of the county for voting purposes. The municipality of Quebec had been divided into two electoral districts, called Quebec Upper Town and Quebec Lower Town, which elected their members separately from Quebec County.

The Union Act changed this situation by providing that the city and town of Quebec would be one district, represented by two members. The Union Act gave the Governor General the power to set the boundaries for the district. Any parts of the city which were not included in the boundaries set by the Governor General would be included in the adjoining electoral district.

The first Governor General, Lord Sydenham, exercised the power to draw boundaries by a proclamation issued shortly after the formation of the Province of Canada in early 1841. His overall goal in drawing the boundaries was to ensure that supporters of the creation of the new Province of Canada and of his government would be elected. The boundaries did not follow the normal municipal boundaries, rather being drawn along certain streets and geographic features. This new electoral district was designed to exclude as many francophone Canadien voters as possible, and to include as many voters of British background as possible, since they generally supported the union and Lord Sydenham's government. It was an example of an ethnic and linguistic gerrymander. The areas of the municipality of Quebec which were not included in the new electoral district of Quebec City instead were included in Quebec County. The result was the effective dilution of Quebec francophone voters in the 1841 election.

In 1853, after the establishment of responsible government and local control, the provincial Parliament passed a statute to expand the number of seats in the Assembly and re-draw the boundaries. As part of that redistribution, the new boundaries for the Quebec electoral district were based on the municipal boundaries of the city, instead of the highly specific boundaries used by Sydenham.

== Members of the Legislative Assembly (1841–1860) ==
Quebec City was a multi-member constituency. Under the Union Act, 1840, it was originally entitled to two members in the Legislative Assembly. In the 1853 redistribution, it was given an additional member, allowing it to return three members to the Legislative Assembly.

The following were the members of the Legislative Assembly for Quebec City. The party affiliations are based on the biographies of individual members given by the National Assembly of Quebec, as well as votes in the Legislative Assembly. "Party" was a fluid concept, especially during the early years of the Province of Canada.

Parliament	Member	Years in Office	Party
1st Parliament; 1841–1844	Henry Black	1841–1844	Unionist; "British" Tory
1st Parliament; 1841–1844	David Burnet (Note: Resigned seat on going bankrupt, August 26, 1843: Côté, Political Appointments and Elections, p. 59, note (33); "David Burnet", Dictionary of Canadian Biography.)	1841–1843	Unionist; independent
1st Parliament; 1841–1844	Jean Chabot (Note: Elected in by-election, September 18, 1843: Côté, Political Appointments and Elections, p. 59, note (34).)	1843–1844 (by-election)	French-Canadian Group
2nd Parliament; 1844–1848	Thomas Cushing Aylwin	1844–1848	French-Canadian Group
2nd Parliament; 1844–1848	Jean Chabot	1844–1848	French-Canadian Group
3rd Parliament; 1848–1851	Thomas Cushing Aylwin (Note: Seat vacated on March 11, 1848, on appointment as Solicitor-General of Canada East, an office of profit under the Crown; re-elected in ministerial by-election, March 28, 1848; resigned seat on April 26, 1848, on judicial appointment: Côté, Appointments and Elections, p. 61, note (112).)	January 24, 1848 to March 11, 1848; March 28, 1848 to April 26, 1848	French-Canadian Group
3rd Parliament; 1848–1851	Jean Chabot (Note: Seat vacated on December 13, 1849, on appointment as Chief Commissioner of Public Works, an office of profit under the Crown; re-elected in ministerial by-election, January 29, 1850: Côté, Appointments and Elections, p. 61, note (113).)	1848–1851	French-Canadian Group
3rd Parliament; 1848–1851	François-Xavier Méthot (Note: Elected in by-election, June 9, 1848: Côté, Political Appointments and Elections, p. 61, note (114).)	June 9, 1848 to 1851 (by-election)	French-Canadian Group, later Ministerialist
4th Parliament; 1851–1854	Hippolyte Dubord	1851–1854	Independent
4th Parliament; 1851–1854	George Okill Stuart Jr.	1851–1854	Independent Tory
5th Parliament; 1854–1857	Charles Joseph Alleyn	1854–1857	Ministerialist
5th Parliament; 1854–1857	Jean Blanchet (Note: Resigned seat due to ill health, March 16, 1857: Côté, Appointments and Elections, p. 63, note (181).)	1854–1857	Ministerialist
5th Parliament; 1854–1857	Jean Chabot (Note: Resigned seat on appointment to the bench, September 20, 1856: Côté, Appointments and Elections, p. 63, note (183).)	1854–1856	Bleu
5th Parliament; 1854–1857	Georges-Honoré Simard (Note: Elected in by-election, October 27, 1856:: Côté, Appointments and Elections, p. 63, note (184).)	1856–1857 (by-election)	Bleu
5th Parliament; 1854–1857	George Okill Stuart Jr. (Note: Elected in by-election, October 27, 1856:: Côté, Appointments and Elections, p. 63, note (185).)	1857 (by-election)	Independent Tory
6th Parliament 1858–1860 (Note: Electoral district abolished effective April 23, 1860: An Act to amend the Act respecting the Representation of the People in the Legislative Assembly, SProvC 1860, c. 1, s. 7.)	Charles Joseph Alleyn (Note: Declared not duly elected, April 16, 1860: J.O. Côté, Political Appointments and Elections in the Province of Canada from 1841 to 1865 (Ottawa: G.E. Desbarats, 1866, 2nd ed.), pp. 114–115.)	1858–1860	Conservative
6th Parliament 1858–1860	Hippolyte Dubord	1858–1860	Bleu
6th Parliament 1858–1860	Georges-Honoré Simard	1858–1860	Bleu

== Significant elections ==
In 1841, in the first general election in the new Province of Canada, the Governor General intervened heavily in the voting in individual ridings, to ensure he had a majority in the Legislative Assembly. In Quebec City, this intervention took the form of pressure on government officials and pensioners to vote for Sydenham's preferred candidates. One of Sydenham's preferred candidates dropped out, but the other, Henry Black, continued. Of the hundred and forty-eight voters in this group, one hundred and forty-five voted for Black.

In the general elections of 1858, there was electoral violence in the Quebec City riding, and two individuals were killed. The elections of all three members were set aside in 1860 as a result.

== Abolition ==
The Quebec electoral district was abolished in 1860, when it was replaced by three single-member districts, Quebec Centre, Quebec East, and Quebec West. The elections of all three of the members of Quebec City elected in the 1858 general elections had been declared void on April 16, 1860. The Act provided that the three new electoral districts came into force immediately on passage of the Act, on April 23, 1860.
