= Augustin-Guillaume Ruel =

Politician in Canada East, Province of Canada

Member of the Legislative Assembly of the Province of Canada for Bellechasse
- In office 1841–1842
- Preceded by: New position
- Succeeded by: Abraham Turgeon

Personal details
- Born: April 17, 1805 Quebec City, Lower Canada
- Died: September 29, 1871 (aged 66) Quebec City, Quebec
- Resting place: Notre-Dame-de-l'Assomption, Berthier
- Party: Anti-unionist
- Relations: Octave-Cyrille Fortier (brother-in-law)
- Profession: Notary

Augustin-Guillaume Ruel (April 17, 1805 – September 29, 1871) was a notary and political figure in Canada East, in the Province of Canada (now Quebec). He represented Bellechasse in the Legislative Assembly of the Province of Canada from 1841 to 1842. He opposed the union of Lower Canada and Upper Canada into the Province of Canada.

He was born in Quebec City, the son of Louis Ruel and Josephte Magnan. He was licensed as a notary in 1829 and set up practice in Berthier.

Following the rebellion in Lower Canada, and the similar rebellion in 1837 in Upper Canada (now Ontario), the British government decided to merge the two provinces into a single province, as recommended by Lord Durham in the Durham Report. The Union Act, 1840, passed by the British Parliament, abolished the two provinces and their separate parliaments, and created the Province of Canada, with a single parliament for the entire province, composed of an elected Legislative Assembly and an appointed Legislative Council. The Governor General retained a strong position in the government.

Ruel stood unopposed for election in the 1841 general election in the new Province of Canada and was acclaimed to the first Legislative Assembly. He was recognised as an anti-unionist, opposed to the creation of the new Province. He also supported Louis-Hippolyte Lafontaine, who was emerging as a leader amongst the French-Canadian members.

Ruel was frequently absent during the 1841 session of the Parliament. He resigned his seat on January 1, 1842 after he was named registrar for the Rimouski judicial district.

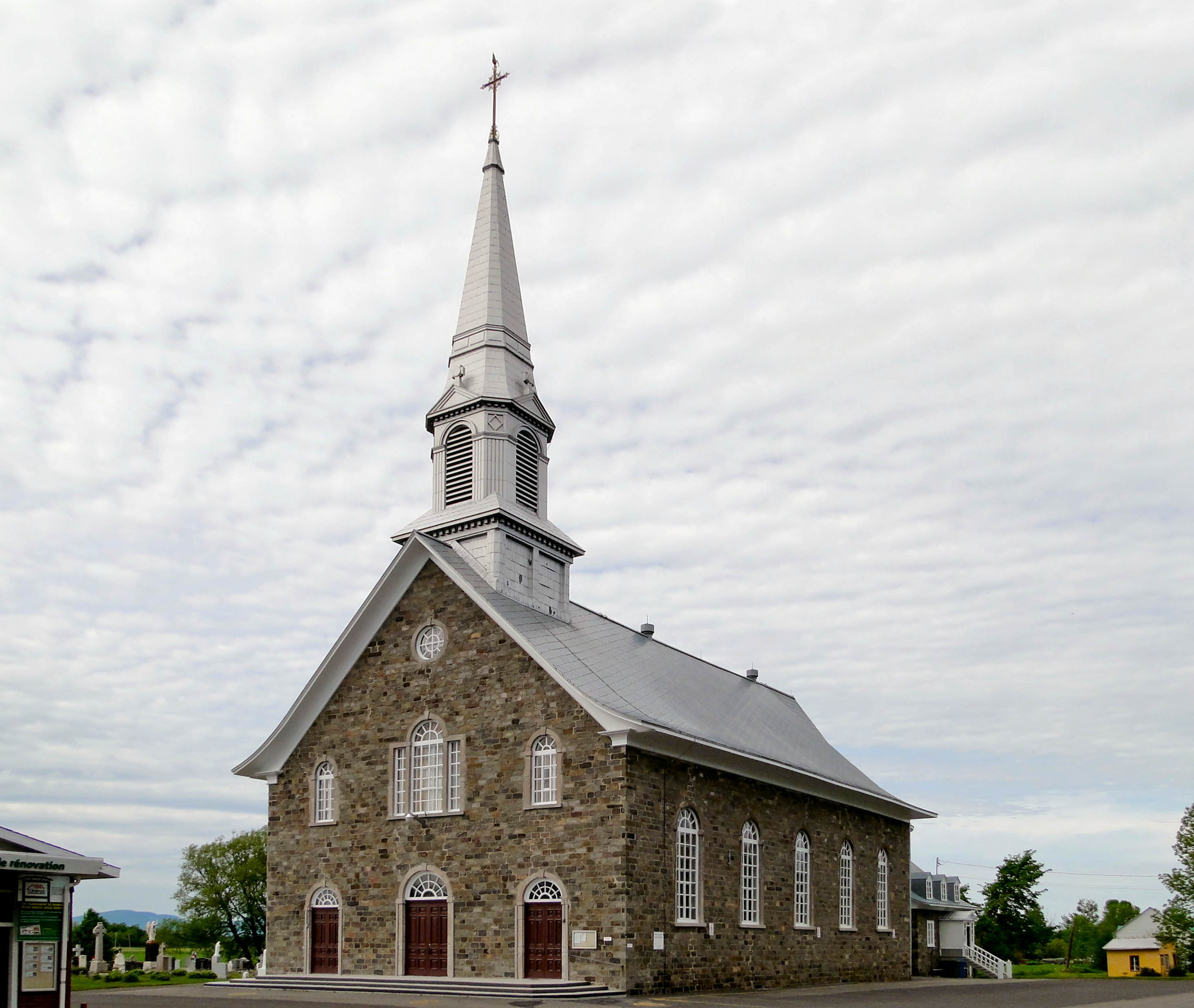
Church of Notre-Dame-de-l'Assomption, Berthier, where Ruel is buried

Ruel's sister Henriette-Émilie married Octave-Cyrille Fortier, who was later elected to the Bellechasse riding. Ruel never married. He died in Quebec City at the age of 62 and was buried at the church of Notre-Dame de l'Assomption, at Berthier.

== See also ==
1st Parliament of the Province of Canada
