= David Burnet (Canada East politician) =

Lower Canada merchant and politician (1803–1853)

Member of the Legislative Assembly of the Province of Canada for Quebec City (two-member constituency)
- In office 1841–1843 Serving with Henry Black
- Preceded by: New position
- Succeeded by: Jean Chabot

Personal details
- Born: 1803
- Died: June 2, 1853 (around 50 years old) Quebec City, Canada East, Province of Canada
- Party: Unionist; independent
- Spouse: Mary Ann Forsyth
- Relations: James Bell Forsyth, brother-in-law
- Occupation: Merchant

David Burnet (c. 1803 – June 2, 1853) was a prominent merchant and political figure in Quebec City, Lower Canada. Although initially successful, both his business activities and his political career were caught short by his bankruptcy. He died around age 50 in Quebec City.

== Business career ==
Burnet was a merchant at Quebec City. He first entered business with his brother Peter, who was involved in the timber trade, importing and ship building. Peter moved to London around 1830 and David replaced him as a director of the Bank of Montreal at Quebec. He had two ships built, one in 1838 and one in 1840, and entered the forwarding business between Kingston and Montreal. In 1832, he was named a warden of Trinity House of Quebec. Burnet was also part owner of a distillery and a textile mill and speculated in real estate.

Around 1830, Burnet married Mary Ann Forsyth, sister of a prominent businessman, James Bell Forsyth. Burnet had business dealings over the years with his brother-in-law.

== Community activities ==
In the 1830s, Burnet was active in the community, as businessman and in philanthropic groups. He was on the Quebec Committee of Trade, and sometimes a member of the management committee of the Quebec Exchange. He was also on the board of directors of the Quebec Emigrant Society, the British and Canadian School Society of the District of Quebec, the St Andrew's Society, the Quebec Auxiliary Bible Society, and the Quebec Male Orphan Asylum.

== Political activities ==
In 1837, the Lower Canada Rebellion broke out, with a similar rebellion in Upper Canada. The British government sent Lord Durham to investigate the causes for the rebellions and propose a solution. In the Durham Report, he recommended that the two Canadas be united into a single province.

There was considerable opposition to the proposal in Lower Canada. Burnet was a member of the Quebec Constitutional Association, formed in Quebec City to oppose the merger of the two provinces. However, in 1840, the British Parliament passed the Union Act, 1840, which abolished the two provinces and their separate parliaments. It created the Province of Canada, with a single Parliament for the entire province, composed of an elected Legislative Assembly and an appointed Legislative Council. The Governor General retained a strong position in the government.

The Union Act came into force in February 1841 and general elections were held in the next month. Burnet stood for election to the Legislative Assembly in the two-member constituency of Quebec City. Although Burnet had opposed the union, in his campaign speech he emphasised the need to respect the law and to try to make the new government system work. He was one of the two members elected from Quebec City, the other being Henry Black, an admiralty judge and government supporter.

At the first session of the new Parliament in 1841, Burnett generally voted as an independent. He voted in favour of a key motion supporting the union, but was generally an opponent of Governor General Sydenham. He was not present for much of the second session in 1842, but was a critic of the restructuring of the ministry that session with a stronger Reform balance and an aim of greater control of government by the Assembly. By 1843, he was approaching bankruptcy, and he resigned shortly before the third session was set to begin.

== Later life and death ==
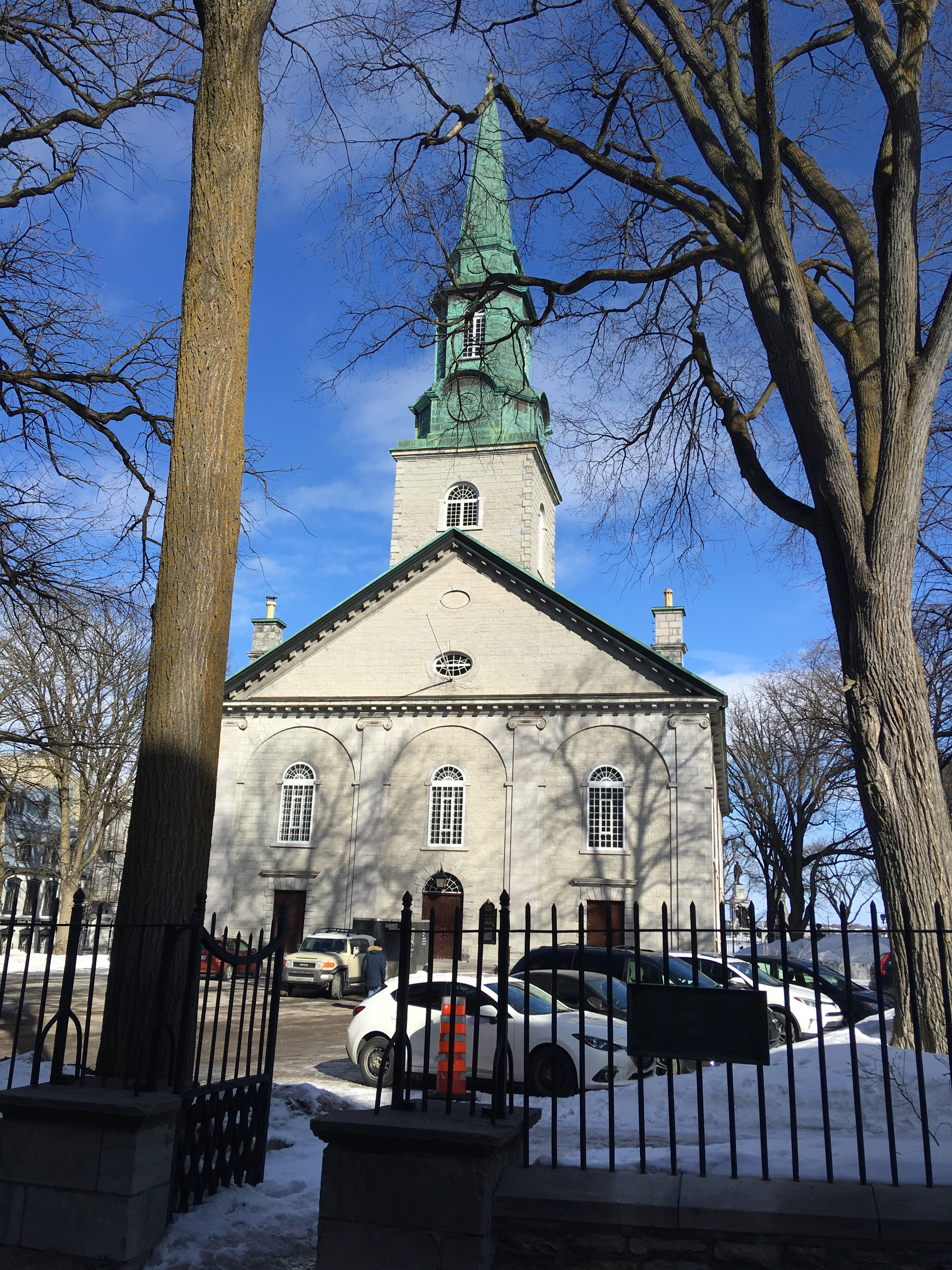
Anglican Cathedral of the Holy Trinity, Quebec, where Burnett's funeral was held

After his bankruptcy, Burnett continued to operate as a merchant on a smaller scale and buy and sell real estate. He died in Quebec City in 1853. His funeral was at the Anglican Cathedral of the Holy Trinity.

== See also ==
- 1st Parliament of the Province of Canada
