= Joseph Légaré =

Canadian artist (1795-1855)

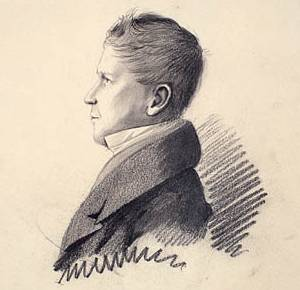
- Born: 1795; Quebec City, Canada
- Died: 1855 (aged 59–60)
- Education: Petit Séminaire de Québec; apprenticed as a painter and glazier with Moses Pierce
- Occupations: Painter, glazier, political figure
- Spouse: Geneviève Damien (m. 1818)

Joseph Légaré (10 March 1795 – 21 June 1855) was a painter and glazier, artist, seigneur and political figure in Lower Canada. He was an important figure in Quebec City during the early nineteenth century, painting nearly 200 works with subject matter ranging from Quebec's landscapes and important figures to current events and history paintings.

== Early life ==
The eldest son in a family of six children, Joseph Légaré was born in Quebec City, the son of a cobbler also called Joseph and Louise Routier, and was educated at the Petit Séminaire de Québec. The financial success of his father as a business man was augmented by extra loans he made and properties rented out. The family became relatively wealthy as a result. The young Joseph spent three years of study at the Seminaire de Quebec but he discontinued his studies in July 1811. On 19 May 1812, he was apprenticed as a painter and glazier with Moses Pierce. With this foundation, he studied seventeenth- and eighteenth-century painters, creating copies and restorations to hang throughout Lower Canada.

== Middle period ==
On 21 April 1818, Légaré married Geneviève Damien. He owned part of the fief of Saint-François from 1827 to 1841. A self-taught artist, he began painting reproductions of European religious works and later produced his own paintings, receiving a medal from the Société pour l'Encouragement des Sciences et des Arts en Canada in 1828. He was the first landscape artist of French-Canadian origin. In 1833, Légaré opened his own gallery in Quebec City, the first art gallery in Canada; it closed two years later. In 1838, he opened another gallery in partnership with lawyer Thomas Amiot. Légaré served as a member of the municipal council for the city and the board of health; he also served as a justice of the peace. In 1842, he helped found the Saint-Jean-Baptiste Society at Quebec and gathered signatures for a petition in support of the Ninety-Two Resolutions. Légaré was an unsuccessful candidate for a seat in the legislative assembly in 1848 and 1850.

== The Connoisseur ==
On the municipal and provincial levels, Légaré's political engagement did not preclude an active role within the cultural life of his time. His activities both as collector and propagandist for art qualify him not merely as a pioneer but as one of the "very first connoisseurs". The "Desjardins Collection" had an enormous influence on his career and he purchased thirty of the works using a loan provided by his father in July 1819. These thirty works formed the nucleus of his collection. The majority of his later acquisitions came through Johan Christopher Reiffenstein and G.D. Balzaretti, two Quebec merchants.

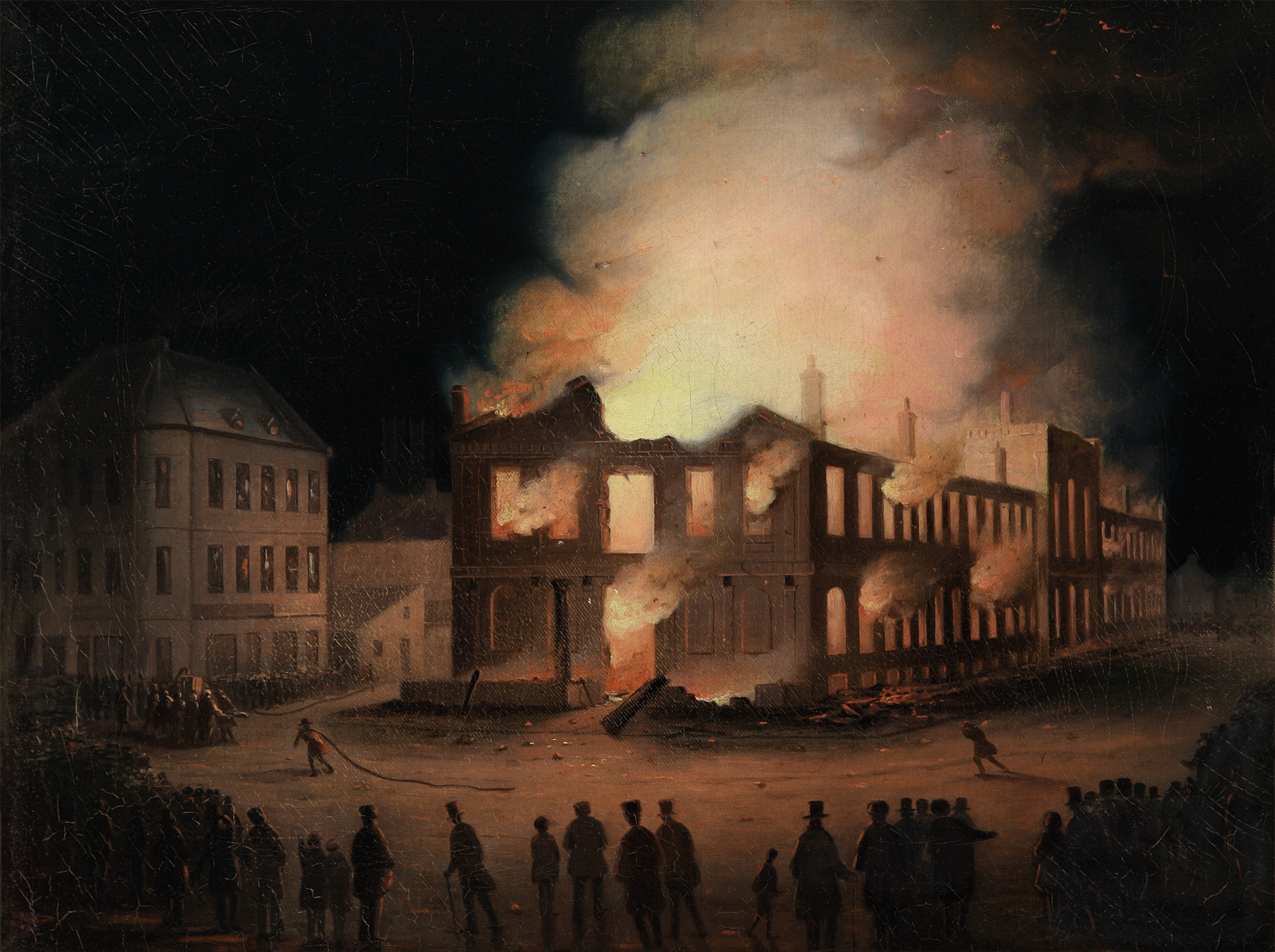
Légaré's The Burning of the Parliament Building in Montreal, 1849.

== Historical paintings ==
Légaré painted a number of works depicting the "customs of North American Indians". However, some of his more memorable works include: First Monastery of the Ursulines at Quebec, Memorials of the Jesuits of New France, The Martyrdom of Brothers Brebeuf and Lalement and The Battle of Sainte-Foy.

== Later years ==
The overall achievement of Légaré contrasts with that of his prolific contemporaries Roy-Audy, Antoine Plamondon and Theophile Hamel. Légaré's relative financial freedom allowed him to paint as he pleased without having to worry about saleability. He sold several works to parish churches and religious orders but did not always find a ready market for his works. Many of his landscapes "were all but rejected by his fellow countrymen, as other of his works were, because of his political opinions". Many of his supporters were "as newspapers of the day often emphasized, foreigners". He was named to the Legislative Council of the Province of Canada in February 1855 and died in office in Quebec City at the age of 60.

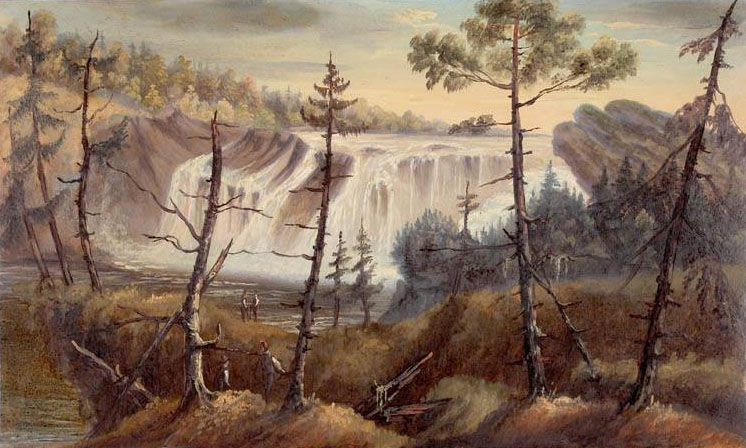
Les chutes Chaudières, Québec (around 1840)

The 1980 film A Québécois Rediscovered: Joseph Légaré 1795-1855 was made about his life. He is featured in the Art Canada Institute's 2025 book, Quebec City Art & Artists: An Illustrated History by Michèle Grandbois.
