= Antoine Plamondon =

Canadian artist (1804–1895)

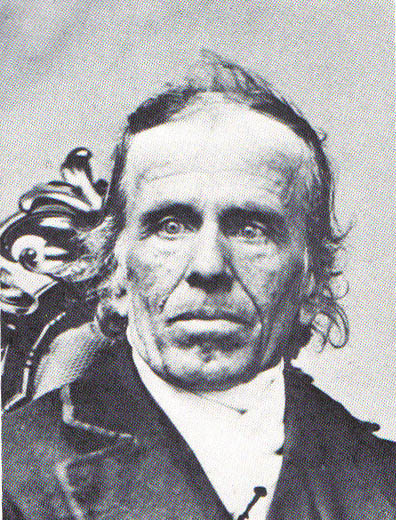
- Plamondon c. 1865
- Born: Antoine-Sébastien Plamondon; 1804; L'Ancienne-Lorette, Quebec
- Died: 1895 (aged 90–91); Ponte-aux-Trembles (present day Neuville, Quebec)
- Education: apprenticed to Joseph Légaré (1819-1825); student of Jean-Baptiste Paulin Guérin, Paris (1823)
- Occupation: Painter

Antoine-Sébastien Plamondon RCA (c. 1804 – 1895) was an artist in Quebec, who became renowned for his portraits and religious paintings, the latter commissioned primarily by churches in and around Quebec City. As a young man, he had traveled to France and studied painting in Paris for four years, with such portraitists as Jean-Baptiste Paulin Guérin.

== Life ==
Plamondon was born in 1804 (or 1802) at L'Ancienne-Lorette, Quebec, the son of the village grocer and his wife. He had at least two siblings. He went to school in Saint-Roch, a suburb of Quebec City, after which he was apprenticed to Joseph Légaré (1795–1855), a picture restorer and painter. While working with Légaré, Plamondon restored works from the Desjardins Collection.

In 1826 at the age of 22, Plamondon travelled to Paris, where he studied with classical portraitists such as Jean-Baptiste Paulin Guérin (1783–1855). Works from this period are scarce.

In the summer of 1830, Plamondon returned from France to Quebec. Paris had become unstable in the days of the July Revolution, which resulted in the downfall of the main Bourbon line and installation of Louis-Philippe of France as "King of the French". In Quebec he specialized in portraits of living subjects. He also did religious paintings (commissioned by various churches and religious orders around Quebec City), generally based on engravings of Old Masters of Europe, which was a common practice among artists of his time. His portraits were notable for his full-face, close-up, and tightly composed style, as well as representations of the latest styles of clothing. His later portraits showed more roundness in the modelling and far more space in the composition.

By 1850 Plamondon had moved several miles upriver to the country at Neuville, with his widowed mother, a brother, and a sister. He lived there for the remainder of his life. Much of his work during this period continued to be religious paintings, copies of Old Masters, commissioned by local churches. Plamondon's self-portrait of 1882 was probably his last work.

== Honors ==
He was made a member of the Royal Canadian Academy of Arts in 1880.

== Personal life ==
Plamondon never married. He died in Neuville in 1895, where his mother, and a brother and sister had lived with him for years.

He was a lifelong monarchist and supporter of the Conservative Party, a friend of Sir George-Étienne Cartier and Sir Étienne Taché. He broke with the Conservatives over their execution in 1885 of Louis Riel, a Métis who fought for the rights of his people in Canada. They had developed as a separate ethnic culture, descended from indigenous, French and English peoples. At the time of Riel's leadership, they were concentrated in the Red River area. The Métis are now formally recognized as a First Nation by the national government.

== Gallery ==
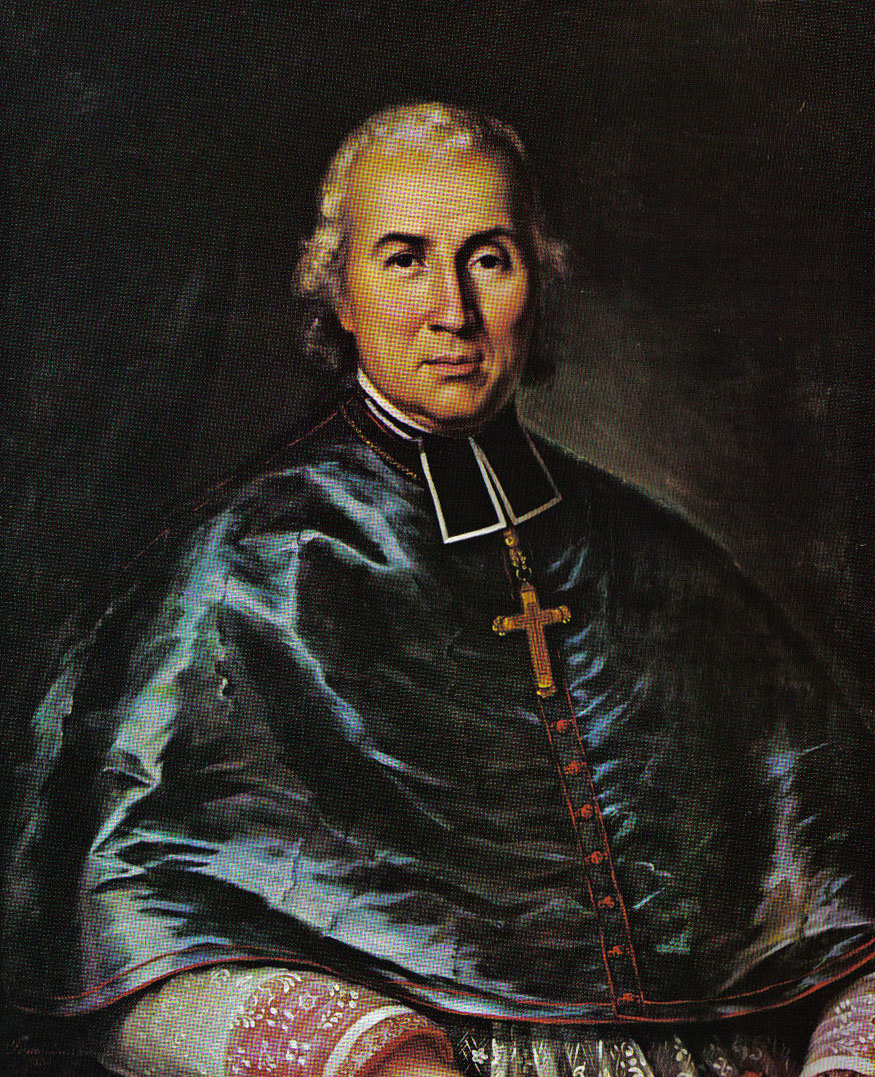
Mgr Joseph Signay, 1836

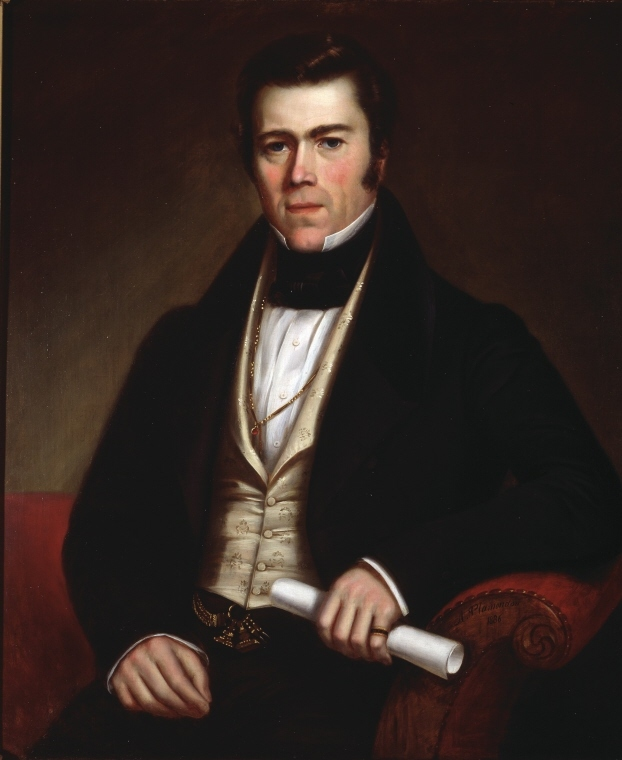
John Redpath, 1836

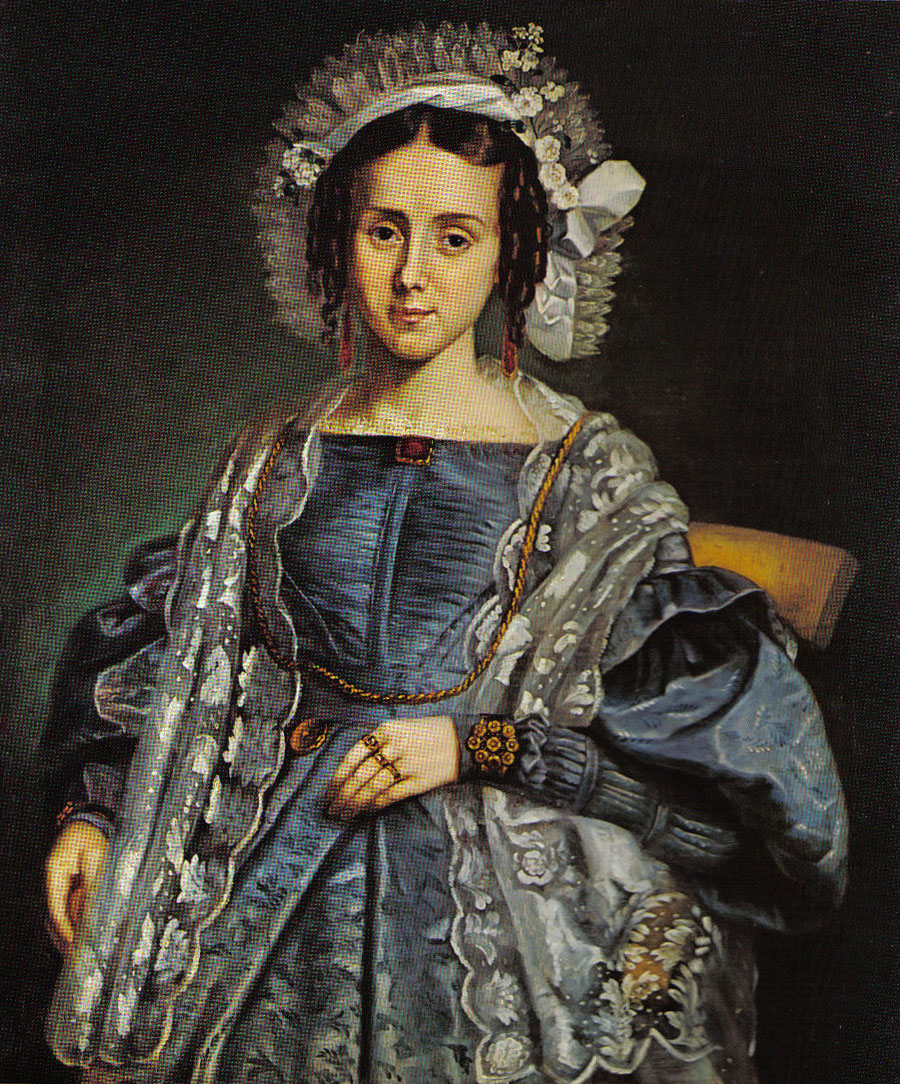
Mme Joseph Laurin, 1839

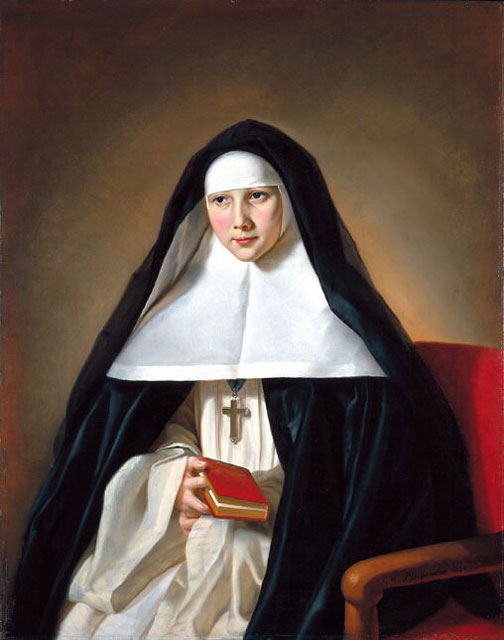
Soeur Saint-Alphonse, 1841, National Gallery of Canada

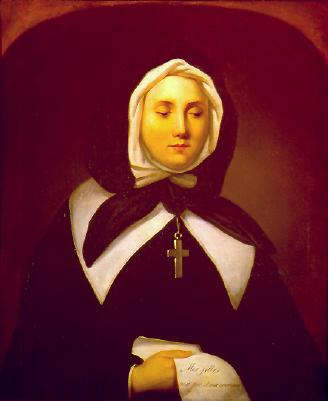
Marguerite Bourgeoys, 1895

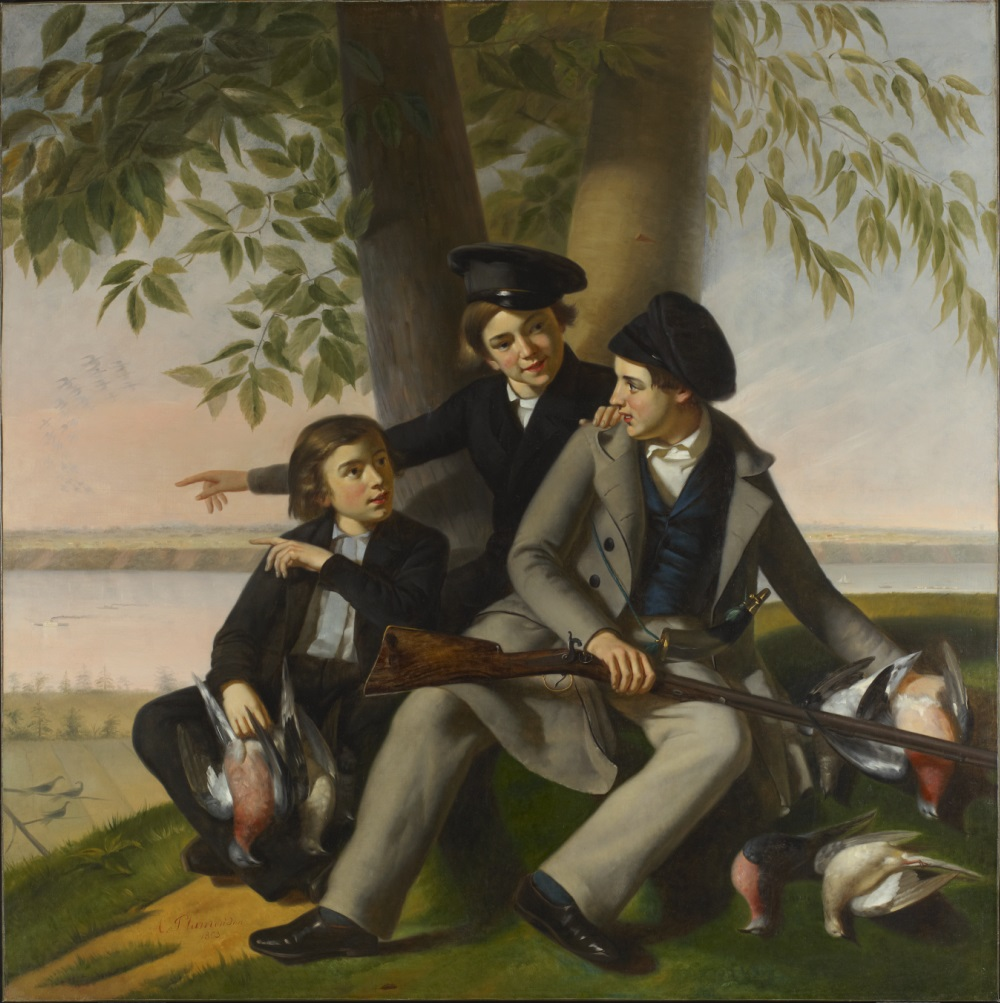
La Chasse aux tourtes (The Pigeon-Hunt), 1857

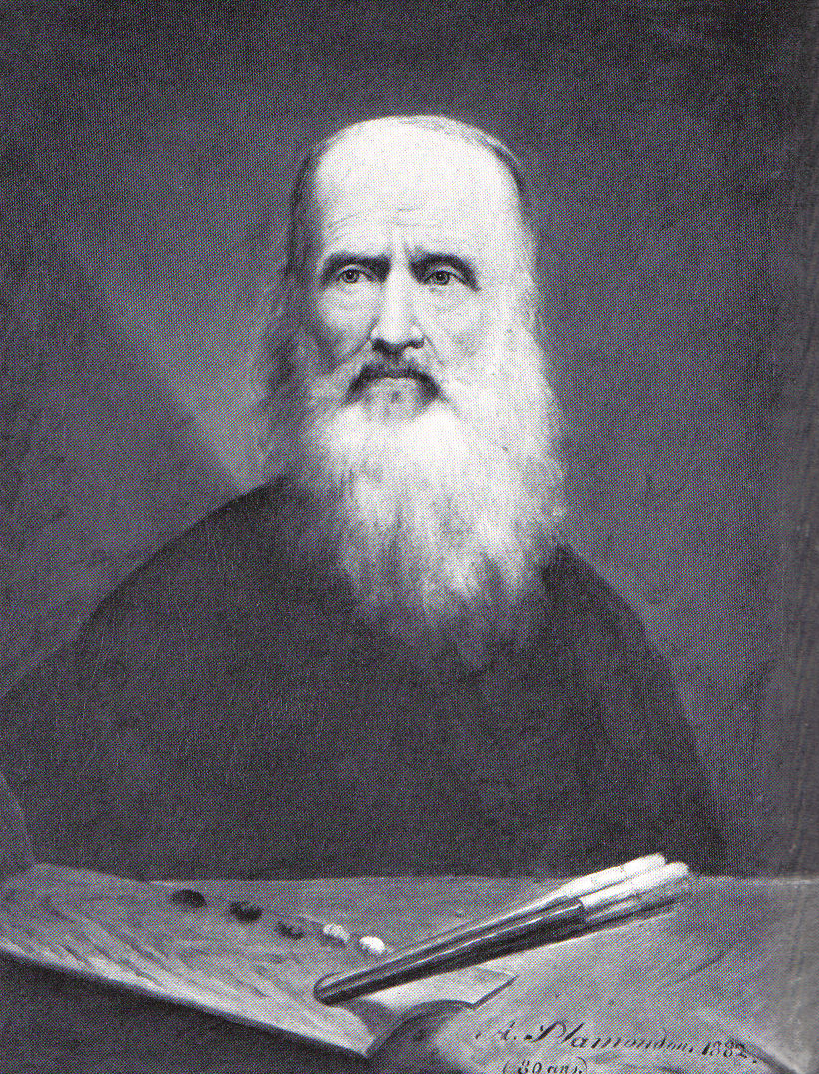
Self portrait, 1882 (black-and-white photo of coloured oil painting)
