= Abraham Turgeon =

Notary and politician in Canada East

Member of the Legislative Assembly of the Province of Canada for Bellechasse
- In office 1842–1844 (by-election)
- Preceded by: Augustin-Guillaume Ruel
- Succeeded by: Augustin-Norbert Morin

Personal details
- Born: February 14, 1783 Saint-Michel, Province of Quebec
- Died: August 2, 1851 (aged 68) Saint-Michel, Canada East, Province of Canada
- Party: French-Canadian Group
- Spouse: Monique Goulet
- Relations: Louis Turgeon (cousin and brother-in-law)
- Profession: Notary

Military service
- Allegiance: Britain
- Branch/service: Lower Canada militia
- Rank: Lieutenant Colonel (militia)
- Unit: 3rd battalion, Bellechasse militia
- Battles/wars: War of 1812

Abraham Turgeon (February 14, 1783 – August 2, 1851) was a notary and political figure in Canada East. He served as an officer in the Lower Canada militia in the War of 1812, was a justice of the peace, and held other civil positions. He represented Bellechasse in the Legislative Assembly of the Province of Canada from 1842 to 1844, as a member of the French-Canadian Group.

Turgeon was born in Saint-Michel, Bellechasse County, in the old Province of Quebec. He was the son of François Turgeon and Geneviève Bauché. His sister Geneviève married their cousin Louis Turgeon, a notary, who was elected three times to the Legislative Assembly of Lower Canada, and then was appointed to the Legislative Council. Abraham apprenticed as a notary with Louis Turgeon, qualified to practise in 1804 and set up his practice in Saint-Gervais. In 1819, he married Monique Goulet.

He served in the militia during the War of 1812, as a captain and adjutant in the Saint-Vallier division. He later reached the rank of lieutenant-colonel, commanding the 3rd battalion of the Bellechasse militia. In 1814, Turgeon was named a justice of the peace. He was appointed commissioner for roads in Hertford County in 1817. In 1825, he was named the census commissioner for Hertford County.

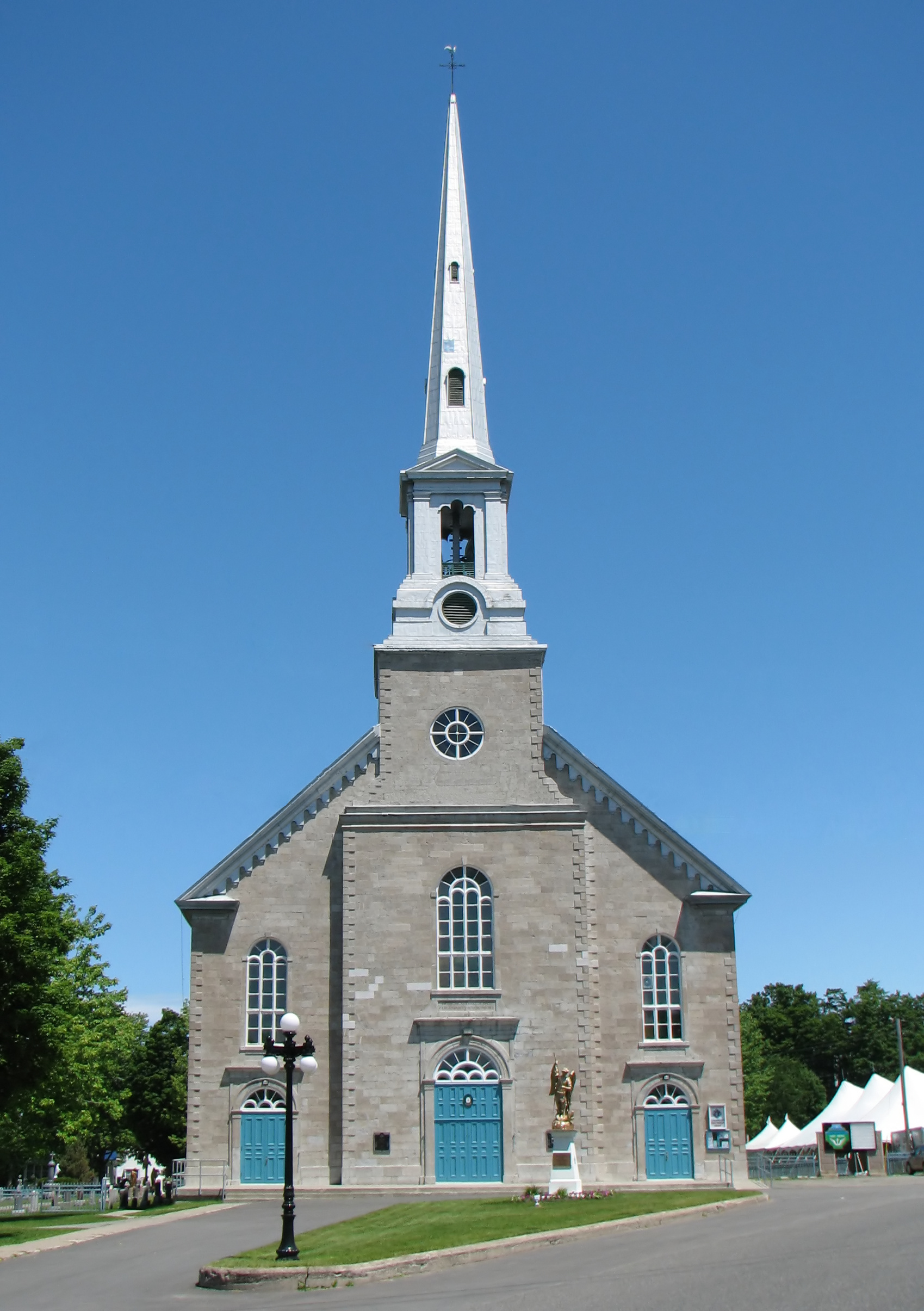
Church of St-Michel-de-Bellechasse, where Turgeon was baptised and later buried

Turgeon was elected to the assembly in an 1842 by-election held after Augustin-Guillaume Ruel accepted an appointment as district registrar. Turgeon was a supporter of Louis-Hippolyte LaFontaine and was part of the French-Canadian Group in the Assembly. He did not stand for re-election in 1844.

Turgeon died in Saint-Michel at the age of 68. He was buried from the parish church.
