= William Locker Pickmore Felton =

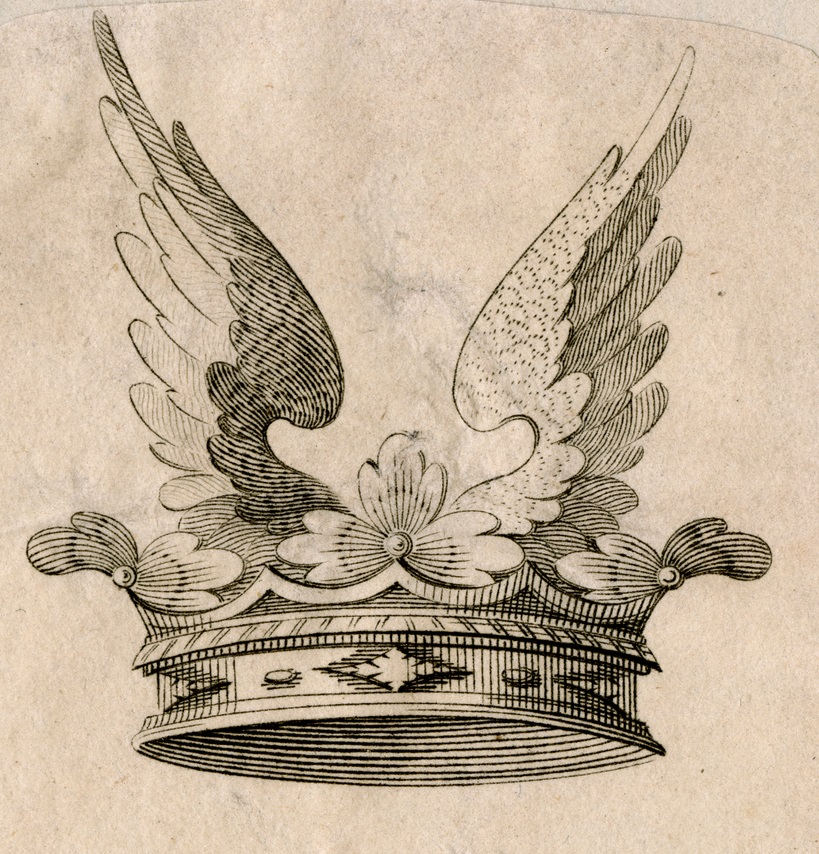
Emblem

William Locker Pickmore Felton, QC (April 6, 1812 – November 12, 1877) was a lawyer and political figure in Canada East.

He was born at Mahón, Menorca in 1812, the son of William Bowman Felton, and came to Lower Canada with his family in 1815. They settled near Sherbrooke. Felton studied law at Quebec City with Andrew Stuart and Henry Black, was called to the bar in 1834 and set up practice at Quebec. In 1835, he married Clara, the daughter of Thomas Lloyd, a surgeon in the British army. Felton served as crown attorney for Saint-François district from 1853 to 1861 and was bâtonnier for the district from 1861 to 1875. In 1854, he was named Queen's Counsel. In 1854, he was elected to the Legislative Assembly of the Province of Canada for the united counties of Sherbrooke and Wolfe as a Liberal-Conservative. He defended the system of separate schools in the province when Joseph Papin proposed a non-denominational school system. His wife Clara helped establish the Collège Mont-Notre-Dame at Sherbrooke.

He died at Sherbrooke in 1877.

His sister Eliza Margaret married Thomas Cushing Aylwin, who also served in the legislative assembly and was later named a judge.
