= Louis Plamondon (lawyer) =

Lower Canada lawyer and bon vivant

Louis Plamondon (April 29, 1785 – January 1, 1828) was a writer, lawyer, militia officer and office holder in Lower Canada.

Plamondon was born in L'Ancienne-Lorrette in the Province of Quebec. He was taken in charge by a local parish priest at age six, and was taught to read and write. He attended the Petit Séminaire de Québec and planned to enter the priesthood himself, but later chose to become a lawyer. He published a short work entitled Almanach des dames pour l’année 1807, par un jeune Canadien while still a legal scholar, and was licensed as an advocate, barrister, attorney, and solicitor on August 1, 1811. It is estimated that Plamondon earned at least £500 per year. He also trained young legal scholars, including Thomas Cushing Aylwin.

Plamondon was a founding member of the Literary Society of Quebec, and served for a time as its secretary. It was in this capacity that he delivered a speech praising King George III of the United Kingdom in 1809. He later served as a militia captain in the War of 1812. He was a founding member of the Quebec Education Society in 1821, and was one of the few francophone members of the Quebec Library.

Plamondon died on January 1, 1828. The Dictionary of Canadian Biography reports that his death was "reputedly from the effects of his excesses as a bon vivant".
