= Le Petit Séminaire de Québec, campus de l'Outaouais =

French language college in Quebec, Canada

- Type: CEGEP
- Established: 1996
- Religious affiliation: Catholic
- Academic affiliations: ACCC, CCAA,
- Administrative staff: Karl Gagné, Director (Campus de l'Outaouais) from 1996 to 2000
- Location: Gatineau, Quebec, Canada
- Campus: Urban
- Website: www.psqco.qc.ca

Le Petit Séminaire de Québec, campus de l'Outaouais is a private French language college in Gatineau, Quebec, Canada. It offers a secondary school International Baccalaureate program as well as the post-secondary Diploma of Collegial Studies.

It was founded in 1996 by Le Petit Séminaire de Québec, a Quebec City based private high school after numerous demands from Outaouais parents and students who wished to have an International Baccalaureate school in their region. It is one of three private colleges making up the Multicollège group.

== See also ==
- List of colleges in Quebec
- Higher education in Quebec
