= Peter Burnet =

Canadian politician

Peter Burnet 1791-1870 was born in Elrick, Aberdeen, Scotland. He moved to Quebec in 1810 where he was merchant and political figure in Lower Canada. He represented Quebec Lower Town in the Legislative Assembly of Lower Canada in 1820.

Around 1820 he had a son Peter with his wife Mary

He operated a business in Quebec City, at first by himself and then, after 1823, in partnership with his brother David. The Burnets imported goods and were involved in the lumber trade, as well as owning river frontage and operating a shipyard on the Saint-Charles River. Burnet was a director for the Bank of Montreal at Quebec City. Elected to the assembly in April 1820, he did not run for reelection in the election held in July later that year. He was opposed to the Union of Upper and Lower Canada proposed in 1822. Around 1830, Burnet moved to London, England.

Sometime in the 1830s he moved to Nice, Alpes-Maritimes, Provence-Alpes-Côte d'Azur, France where he died January 19, 1870.

In 1859, he acquired the seigneury of Grondines.
