= Thomas Cushing Aylwin =

Lawyer, political figure and judge in Lower Canada

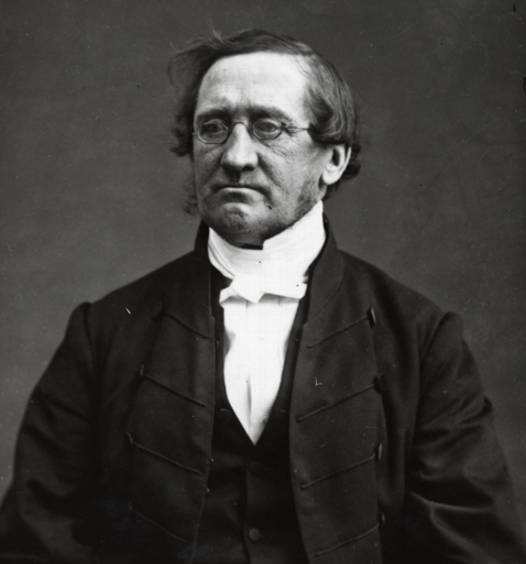

Member of the Legislative Assembly of the Province of Canada for Portneuf (two elections)
- In office 1841–1844
- Preceded by: New position
- Succeeded by: Lewis Thomas Drummond

Member of the Legislative Assembly of the Province of Canada for Quebec City (three elections) (two member constituency)
- In office 1844–1848 Serving with Jean Chabot
- Preceded by: Henry Black
- Succeeded by: François-Xavier Méthot

Solicitor-General for Lower Canada
- In office September 24, 1842 – December 11, 1843
- Preceded by: Charles Dewey Day
- Succeeded by: Position vacant until August 21, 1845
- In office March 11, 1848 – April 25, 1848
- Preceded by: Joseph-Édouard Turcotte
- Succeeded by: Lewis Thomas Drummond

Court of Queen's Bench, Lower Canada / Quebec
- In office April 26, 1848 – 1868

Personal details
- Born: January 5, 1806 Quebec City, Lower Canada
- Died: October 14, 1871 (aged 65) Montreal, Quebec
- Resting place: Mount Hermon Cemetery, Sillery, Quebec
- Party: French-Canadian Group; Reform
- Spouse(s): (1) Margaret Nelson Hanna (m. June 2, 1832) (2) Eliza Margaret Felton (m. May 14, 1836 (3) Ann Blake (m. September 7, 1850)
- Relations: William Bowman Felton (father-in-law); William Locker Pickmore Felton (brother-in-law)
- Education: Articled clerkship at law; Harvard University
- Profession: Lawyer, judge

Thomas Cushing Aylwin (January 5, 1806 – October 14, 1871) was a lawyer, political figure and judge in Lower Canada (now Quebec). He was born in Quebec City and trained as a lawyer, including a period of education at Harvard University. He developed a reputation as an excellent trial lawyer, particularly in criminal cases. He became interested in politics and supported the nationalist Parti canadien (later the Parti patriote) in their struggles with the British governors of the province. He did not support the armed rebellion in 1837, but defended some of the individuals accused of treason or other crimes for their roles in the rebellion.

After the creation of the Province of Canada in 1841, merging Lower Canada with Upper Canada, Aylwin was elected to the Legislative Assembly of the new province. Fluently bilingual, he was renowned for his debating skills in the Assembly, in either language, often with a fair bit of sarcasm. He served twice as the solicitor-general of Lower Canada, in the Reform ministries of Louis-Hippolyte Lafontaine and Robert Baldwin. In 1845, he fought a duel with a former Executive Council colleague, Dominick Daly, over Daly's lack of support for responsible government in the ministerial crisis of 1843.

In 1848, Lafontaine appointed Aylwin to the Court of Queen's Bench for Lower Canada, partly to make space on the Executive Council for another member of the Reform coalition. Aylwin served as a judge for twenty years, and continued to build on his reputation for detailed knowledge of the law, coupled with the ability to move quickly to the key points in issue in a case. His eloquence, now on the bench, continued to draw notice. However, in 1860 he had a stroke, which reduced his health and his mental acuity. He resigned from the bench in 1868, and died in 1871.

Aylwin was married three times, and widowed twice. None of his marriages produced children.

== Early life and education ==
Aylwin was born in Quebec City in 1806, son of Thomas Aylwin and of Louise-Catherine Connolly. His paternal grandparents were Thomas Aylwin and Lucy Cushing, who had moved to Quebec from Massachusetts after the outbreak of the American Revolution. His grandfather was a merchant at Quebec, as was his father.

Aylwin's education began in a private school operated by a Presbyterian minister, Daniel Wilkie. He studied for a short time at Harvard College, without taking a degree.

== Legal career ==
Aylwin articled in law, first with Louis Moquin and Louis Plamondon in Quebec, then with John Thompson in Gaspé, who was later appointed to the district court. Aylwin was called to the bar in 1827. Fluently bilingual, he acted as an interpreter in the courts in Quebec in his mid-teens.

He entered the practice of law in partnership with Edward Short, who later was also a member of the Legislative Assembly and then appointed to the bench. Aylwin developed a reputation as an excellent criminal lawyer, able to see the strengths and weaknesses in a case better than other lawyers. He was also known for his eloquence in court, in both English and French. Following the Lower Canada Rebellion in 1837, he was defence counsel for some of the prisoners who had taken up arms.

Aylwin was appointed Queen's Counsel in 1842, on his appointment as Solicitor-General of Lower Canada.

== Political career ==
=== Lower Canada ===
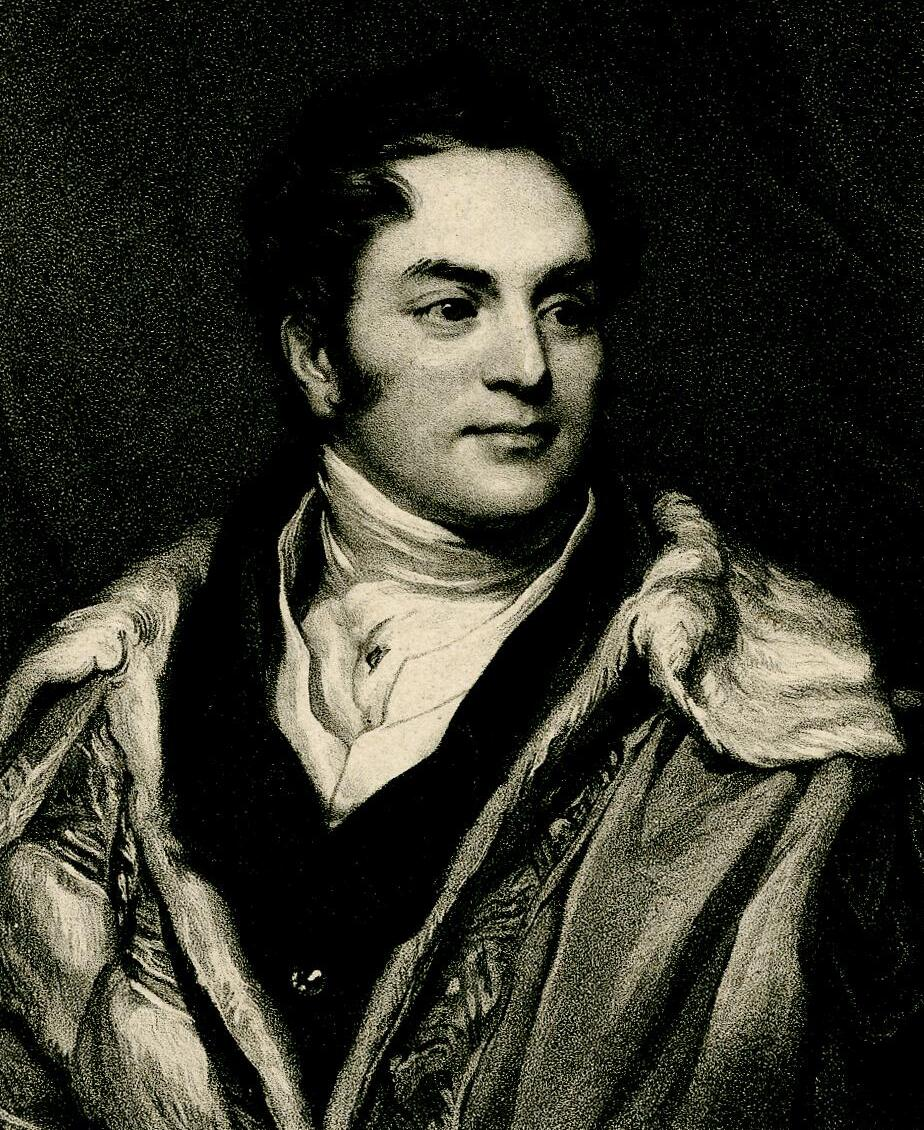
Lord Gosford, Governor General of British North America, who was the target of Aylwin's "slashing" newspaper critiques

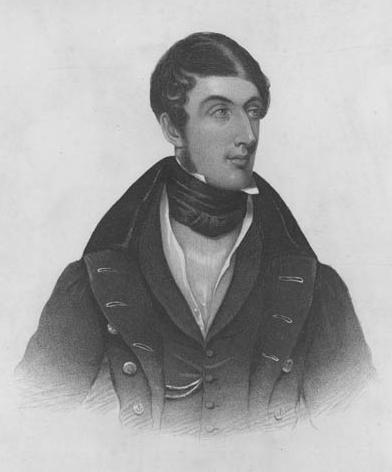
Lord Sydenham, Governor General of the Province of Canada, whom Aylwin opposed in Parliament

Aylwin began his political involvement in the 1830s, as a founding member of the Constitutional Association of Quebec, which aimed at increasing popular control of government through the elected Legislative Assembly. He wrote numerous "slashing" articles published in the newspapers, critiquing Governor General Lord Gosford's policies. He agreed with some of the policies of the Parti patriote, but did not support their move to rebellion under the leadership of Louis-Joseph Papineau. Following the Lower Canada Rebellion in 1837–1838, he was defence counsel for some of prisoners who were arrested after taking up arms.

=== Province of Canada ===
==== Role in the Legislative Assembly ====
As a result of the Lower Canada Rebellion, and a similar rebellion the same year in Upper Canada (now Ontario), the British Parliament passed the Union Act which merged the two Canadas into the Province of Canada. There was a single Parliament for the new province, composed of an elected Legislative Assembly and an appointed Legislative Council. The Governor General retained a strong position in the government.

The Union Act came into force in 1841, and Aylwin stood for election to the new Legislative Assembly, the lower house of the Parliament. He was elected by acclamation to the Legislative Assembly district of Portneuf, campaigning against the union of the Canadas.

In the first session of the Parliament, the first major item of business was a motion on the union of the Canadas. The motion passed, supporting the union. Opposition to the motion came from the group of French-Canadian members, along with some English Canadians from Canada East, and the Ultra Reformers from Canada West. Aylwin voted with the French-Canadian group, opposed to the union. As the session went on, Aylwin's voting pattern demonstrated that he was a consistent opponent of the government of Governor General Lord Sydenham.

Aylwin became recognised as a leader in parliamentary debates, due to his personal popularity and also his talents in oratory and argument, honed in his years as a courtroom barrister. He was able to argue the strong points of his position, and clearly point out the weaknesses in opposing views. Although he generally voted along the same lines as the French-Canadian Group, he was not a close member of the Group and had little in common with many of them. In debate, he often used "sarcasm and vituperation", and was later said to have had a "tongue that cut like a sword".

==== Solicitor General, 1842–1843 ====
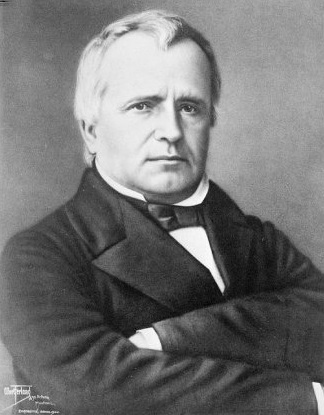
Louis-Hippolyte Lafontaine, who had Aylwin appointed Solicitor-General for Lower Canada

Lord Sydenham died suddenly at the end of the first session of the new Parliament. His successor as governor general, Sir Charles Bagot, had to reconstruct the ministry. Sydenham had tried to have a broad-based ministry, reducing the strength of the Reformers and the French-Canadians, but those two groups had developed their strength in the Assembly, under the leadership of Louis-Hippolyte LaFontaine from Canada East, and Robert Baldwin from Canada West. Bagot found that he had to invite them into the Executive Council. Aylwin was appointed Solicitor-General for Lower Canada, replacing Charles Dewey Day, a Tory. The law at that time required that a member of the Assembly who took an office under the Crown had to resign his seat in the Assembly and stand for re-election. Aylwin was re-elected in the Portneuf riding.

During his time as Solicitor-General, Aylwin gave strong support for a proposal made by another member, John Solomon Cartwright, for the creation of juvenile reform schools for young offenders, who at that time were housed in the same prisons as adult offenders. The Assembly referred the matter to a special committee for consideration. However, the proposal never came to a vote, as the Legislative Assembly was prorogued in December 1843, upon the resignation of the Lafontaine–Baldwin ministry.

==== Resignation of LaFontaine-Baldwin ministry 1843 ====
The LaFontaine-Baldwin ministry only lasted a year, from September 1842 to November 1843. Governor General Bagot died in early 1843 and was replaced by Sir Charles Metcalfe. Metcalfe had instructions from the British government to prevent party rule from developing, and to retain the governing powers of the Crown. LaFontaine and Baldwin, on the other hand, were determined to develop responsible government in Canada, which would require the Governor General to appoint the ministry from the political group which controlled the elected Legislative Assembly, and allow the ministers to appoint government officials who would carry out their policies.

Matters came to a head in October and November 1843, when Metcalfe filled various government positions without consulting the Executive Council. On November 28, 1843, all but one of the members of the LaFontaine-Baldwin ministry resigned their positions in the Executive Council in protest. The only exception was the Provincial Secretary, Dominick Daly, who remained in office alone.

==== Opposition 1843 – 1848 ====
Governor General Metcalfe prorogued the first Parliament in 1843 after the resignation of the Executive Council, and did not recall it. In 1844 he dissolved Parliament, triggering new general elections. The Reformers in Upper Canada lost significantly, changing the balance of power in the new Legislative Assembly. Metcalfe was able to draw on more conservative members to form a new ministry.

Aylwin again stood for Parliament in 1844, this time in Quebec City, and was elected. His background as a strong supporter of the French-Canadian group, and his fluent bilingualism, stood him in good stead with the electorate. He was also one of the leading party organisers for Lafontaine in Quebec City, with considerable success.

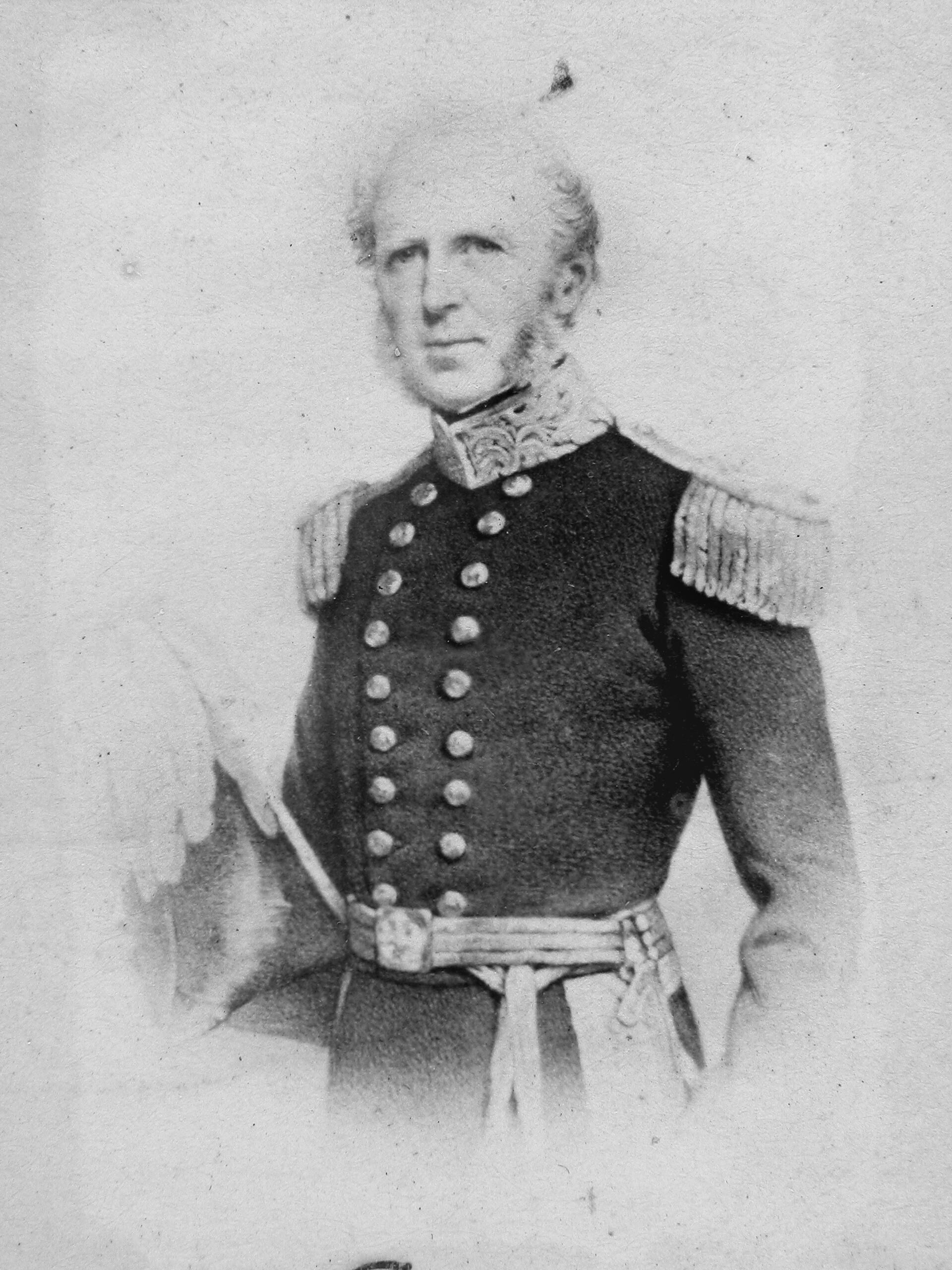
Dominick Daly, who fought a duel with Aylwin over Daly's decision not to resign in 1843

Aylwin became a leading figure on the opposition benches in the new Parliament, with his lawyer's skill in debate and his personal popularity. His debating style was could be both eloquent and aggressive, relying on sarcasm as well as his understanding of the issues. One contemporary newspaper described him as "Short, nearsighted, and (at this time at least) never quite sober, Aylwin commanded not by his physical presence as much as by his charming, genial bluffness and, above all, by his prodigious bilingual gift for words."

One target of his tongue was his former colleague, Dominick Daly, still in government. In 1845, there was a particularly pointed exchange of comments in the Assembly between Aylwin and Daly over Daly's refusal to resign from the Executive Council with the rest of the Lafontaine-Baldwin ministry in 1843. Tempers flared, resulting in a duel between the two men. They met and shots were fired, but neither was injured, leading to a settlement of the dispute.

==== Solicitor-General 1848 ====
Aylwin was re-elected for Quebec City in the general elections of 1848, which the Reform alliance won. Lafontaine and Baldwin formed their second ministry, and Aylwin was again appointed Solicitor-General for Lower Canada. He had to stand for election under the same law as earlier, for taking a position under the Crown.

The election was held quickly and he was re-elected on March 28, 1848. However, he only held the position for a short time, as Lafontaine offered him an appointment to the Court of Queen's Bench for Lower Canada, in Quebec City, possibly to make room for another member of the Reform group, Hume Blake. Aylwin accepted the appointment on April 26, 1848, and left politics.

== Court of Queen's Bench ==
In 1848, Aylwin accepted the appointment as judge if the Court of Queen's Bench, sitting first in Quebec. He later was transferred to Montreal. In 1854, he was also appointed to the Seigneurial Court, which was set up to resolve claims resulting from the abolition of seigneurial tenures of land-holding.

While on the bench, Aylwin continued to maintain his reputation for deep knowledge of the law, clear understanding of the issues presented, and eloquence in his charges and decisions. He presided over trials in both English and in French. However, in 1860 he had a paralytic stroke which impaired both his physical and mental abilities. He resigned from the bench in 1868, on a pension.

== Marriages and later life ==
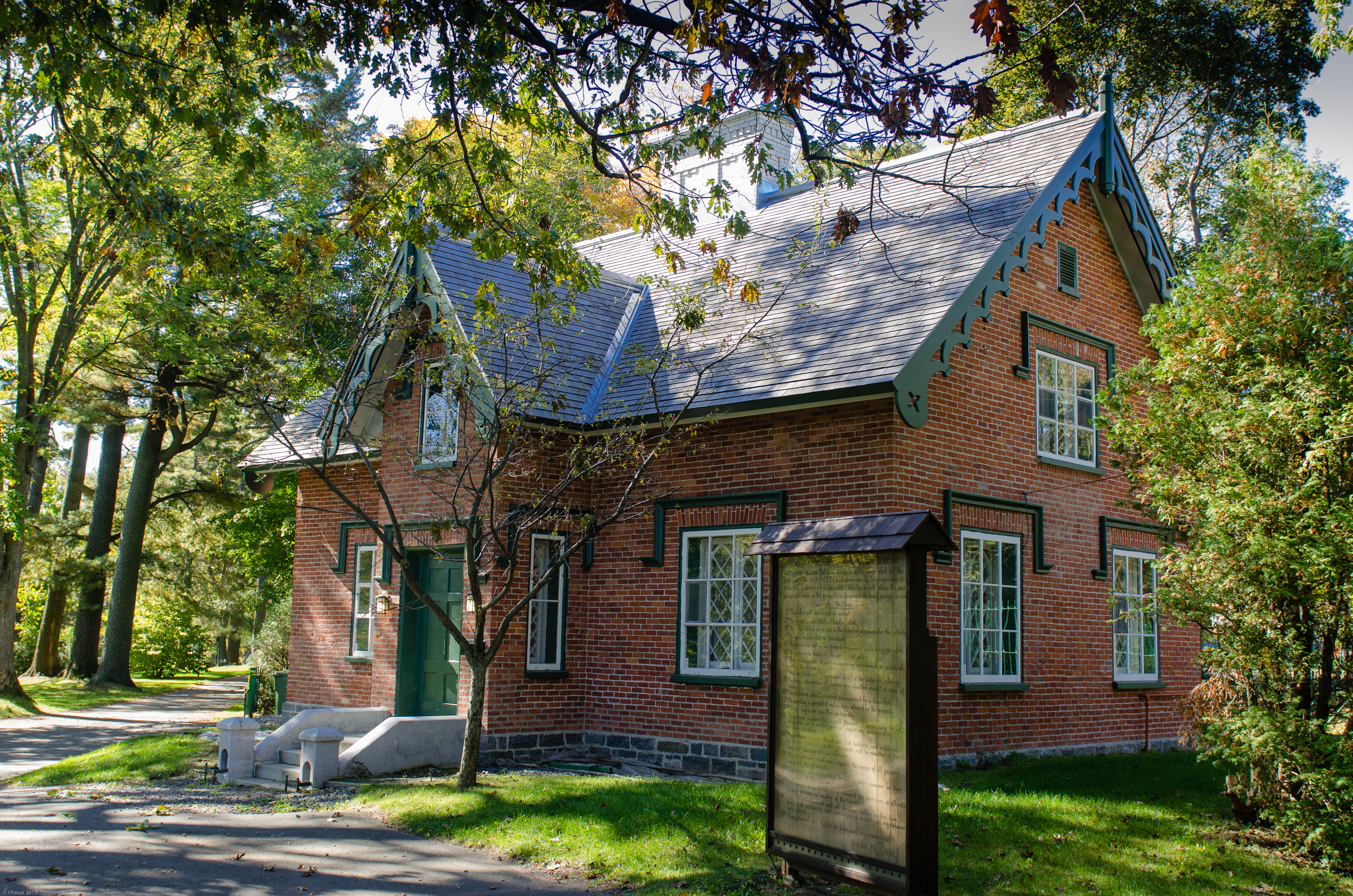
Entrance to Mount Hermon Cemetery, where Aylwin is buried

Aylwin was married three times, and widowed twice. His first wife was Margaret Nelson Hanna, whom he married in Quebec City in 1832. In 1836, after the death of his first wife, he married Eliza Margaret Felton of Sherbrooke. She also predeceased him. In 1850, he married Anne Blake. He did not have any children from the three marriages.

After retiring from the bench, Aylwin lived in strict seclusion in his home in Montreal.

He died in Montreal on October 14, 1871. He was buried at Mount Hermon Cemetery in Sillery, on October 17, 1871.

Aylwin Township in the Outaouais region of Quebec, Canada, was named in his honour in 1858. It was renamed Kazabazua in 1976.

== See also ==
- 1st Parliament of the Province of Canada
- 2nd Parliament of the Province of Canada
