= Octave-Cyrille Fortier =

- Born: 5 August 1810; Quebec City, Canada
- Died: 22 July 1878 (aged 67)
- Occupations: physician and political figure

Octave-Cyrille Fortier (5 August 1810 – 22 July 1878) was a medical doctor and political figure in Canada East. He represented Bellechasse in the Legislative Assembly of the Province of Canada from 1854 to 1861.

He was born in Quebec City, the son of François Fortier and Madeleine-Béatrice Poulin. Fortier was licensed to practise medicine in 1830 and set up practice in Saint-Gervais. In 1833, he married Henriette-Émilie Ruel, the sister of Augustin-Guillaume Ruel. He was first elected to the assembly in an 1854 by-election held after Jean Chabot was elected in two ridings and chose to represent Quebec City. Fortier was defeated when he ran for reelection in 1861. He served as sergeant at arms for the Legislative Council from 1865 to 1867.

His son Edmond served in the Canadian House of Commons.
