= Henry Black (Quebec judge) =

Canadian lawyer, politician, and judge

Henry Black CB, QC, LL.D. (hon. c.)
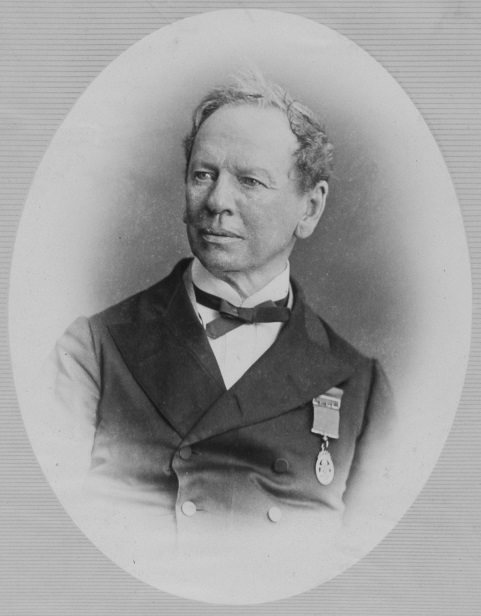
- Henry Black, around 1871, wearing the civil badge of a Companion of the Bath

Judge of the Vice-Admiralty Court, Quebec
- In office September 28, 1836 – August 16, 1873

Special Council of Lower Canada
- In office April 18, 1840 – February 10, 1841

Member of the Legislative Assembly of the Province of Canada for Quebec City (two member constituency)
- In office 1841–1844 Serving with: David Burnet (1841–1842); Jean Chabot (1843–1844)
- Preceded by: New position
- Succeeded by: Thomas Cushing Aylwin

Personal details
- Born: December 18, 1798 Quebec City, Lower Canada
- Died: August 16, 1873 (aged 74) Quebec City, Quebec
- Party: Unionist; Government supporter
- Relations: George Okill Stuart Jr. (nephew by marriage)
- Occupation: Lawyer, judge
- Awards: Companion of the Bath; Doctor of Laws (honoris causa, Harvard)

Henry Black CB, Q.C., LL.D. (hon.c.) (December 18, 1798 – August 16, 1873) was a lawyer, political figure, and judge in the Province of Canada, and later in the province of Quebec. He was the judge in the Court of Vice-Admiralty for the Quebec City district for most of his adult life. During that time, he was briefly a member of the Special Council which governed Lower Canada following the Lower Canada Rebellions of 1837 and 1838. He also served one term in the Legislative Assembly of the Province of Canada, as a member for Quebec City.

He died unmarried at age 74, still carrying out his duties as vice-admiralty judge, as he had done for thirty-seven years.

== Early life and family ==
Black was born in Quebec City in 1798, son of James and Margaret Black. His father was a native of Jedburgh, Scotland. He attended a private school in Quebec run by a Presbyterian minister, Dr Daniel Wilkie. He then studied and worked as an articled student-at-law, and was admitted to the bar in 1820.

By 1831, Black was prosperous enough to buy the seigneurie of Deschambault.

== Legal and judicial careers ==
After articles, Black joined the law practice of Andrew Stuart at Quebec City. Stuart was a leading lawyer at the time, and also was a member of the Legislative Assembly of Lower Canada. Stuart had supported the populist Parti canadien in their struggles with the British governors, but broke with them in the run-up to the Lower Canada Rebellions of 1837 and 1838.

In 1836, Black was appointed judge in the Court of Vice-Admiralty for the Quebec district. The vice-admiralty courts were created by British law. The judges were initially appointed by the local colonial government, then confirmed by the British government. In 1838, the British government issued the letters patent confirming Black in the position in 1838. He went on to serve as the president of the court for thirty-seven years.

Black was appointed King's Counsel in 1836, the same year as his appointment to the Vice-admiralty Court. In 1849, he was the first bâtonnier of the Bar of Lower Canada (now the Barreau du Québec).

== Political career ==
=== Special Council of Quebec ===
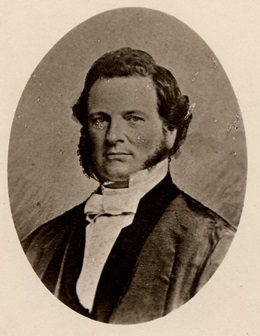
Henry Black around 1845

In 1837, the political tensions in Lower Canada reached a peak, and the Lower Canada Rebellion broke out. In response, the British Parliament passed a statute to suspend the Parliament and government of Lower Canada, and created the Special Council to govern the provinces. In 1840, Black was named to the Special Council, a position he held for the next year.

=== Legislative Assembly of the Province of Canada ===
Following the rebellions in Lower Canada and Upper Canada, the British government decided to merge the two provinces into a single province, the Province of Canada. Under the Union Act, 1840, there was a single Parliament for the new Province, composed of an elected Legislative Assembly and an appointed Legislative Council. The Governor General retained a strong position in the government.

The first Governor General for the new province, Lord Sydenham, was determined that the elections would return a majority in favour of his policies supporting the new union. The constituency of Quebec City was entitled to two members. Sydenham ensured that two of the candidates would be government supporters: Black, and James Gibb, who was a strong supporter of the union. However Gibbs realised he did not have popular support and withdrew. The elections were by open voting, not secret ballot, and Sydenham pressured voters who were government officials to vote for Black. He was elected, gaining 145 of 148 votes cast by government officials and pensioners. (The second successful candidate, David Burnet, was an independent.)

Throughout his term in Parliament, Black was a supporter of the Governor General, as a member of the "British Tories" group from Lower Canada. In one of the key votes in the first session in 1841, he voted in favour of the union. For the rest of the four years of the Parliament, Black consistently voted for governments supported by the Governor General. He opposed the developing Reform group, led by Louis-Hippolyte Lafontaine and Robert Baldwin. While in the Assembly, Black was involved in some criminal law reforms.

Black did not stand for re-election in 1844.

== Later life and death ==
Black devoted himself to his duties as the president of the vice-admiralty court for the Quebec district for the rest of his life. He became known as an expert in admiralty law. He never married.

The government of the Province of Canada repeatedly solicited Black to accept a position on the Court of Queen's Bench of Lower Canada, and in 1866 offered him the position of Chief Justice of the Superior Court. However, Black preferred to stay on his position in the Vice-admiralty court. He also declined an invitation from Lafontaine to take on a project for the reorganisation of the courts of Lower Canada.

During the 1860s, an issue arose because there were no courts with admiralty jurisdiction over the Great Lakes, which were increasingly used for shipping. Black suggested that the jurisdiction of the Vice-Admiralty Court in Quebec should be extended to the Great Lakes, but the imperial authorities rejected the possibility. At that time, the jurisdiction of admiralty courts was limited to tidal waters. Since the Great Lakes were not tidal, the admiralty courts could not be given jurisdiction over them.

Black was a corresponding member of the Massachusetts Historical Society from 1840 until his death. He had family connections to Massachusetts, which he visited from time to time. He was also on friendly terms, both personally and professionally, with Chancellor James Kent of New York and Justice Joseph Story of the Supreme Court of the United States.

One of his nieces married George Okill Stuart, a nephew of his old law partner, Andrew Stuart. George Okill Stuart had worked with Black as an associate, and in 1873 was appointed Black's deputy judge. He succeeded to the position of Judge of the Vice-Admiralty Court after Black's death.

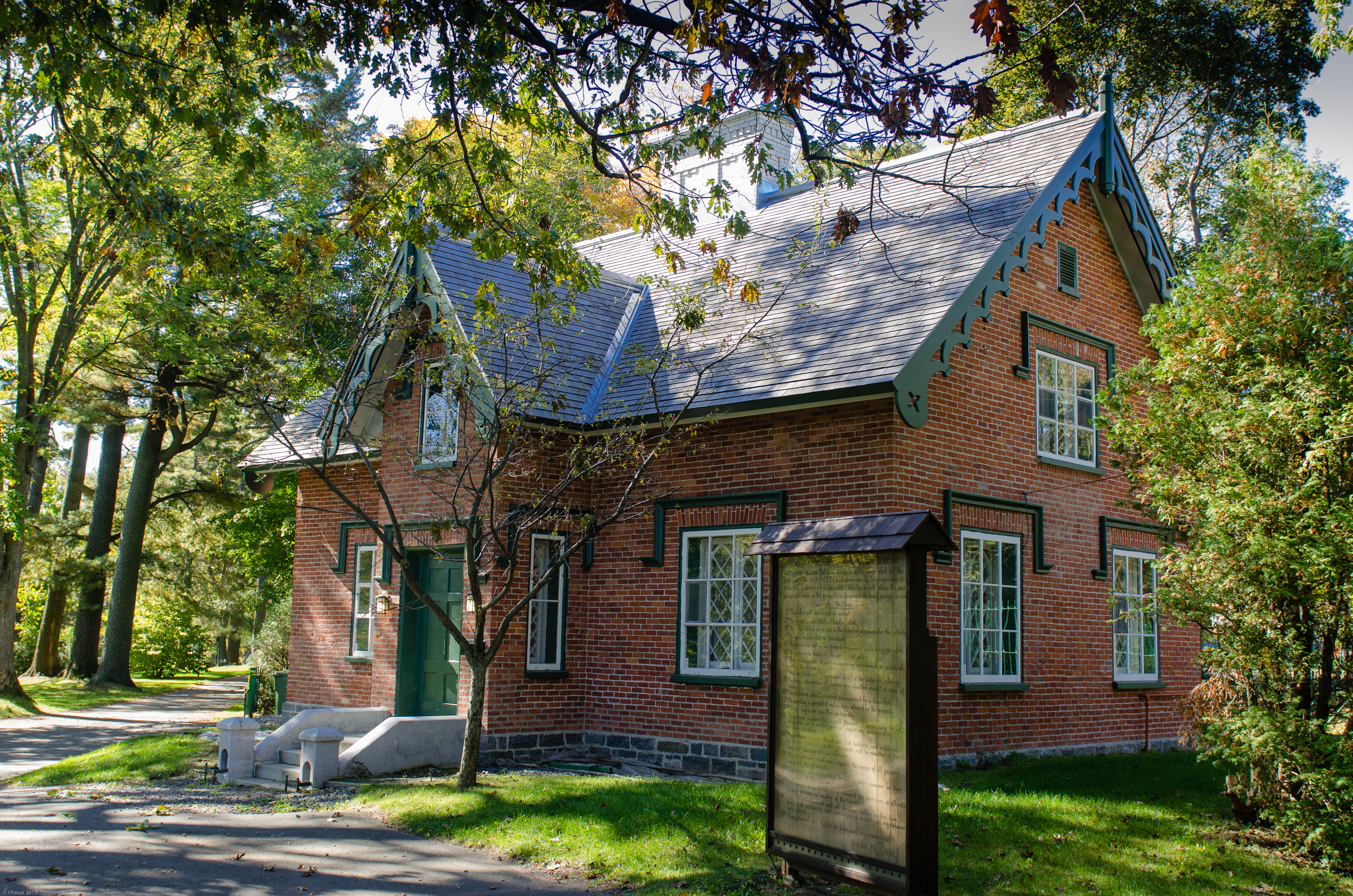
Entrance to Mount Hermon cemetery, where Black was interred

Black died of an attack of erysipelas in Cacouna, Quebec, in 1873, where he had gone in the summer to take the baths. His funeral was held at the Anglican Cathedral of the Holy Trinity in Quebec City. He was interred in his family mausoleum in Mount Hermon Cemetery in Sillery.

His obituary in a contemporary Quebec City newspaper, L’Événement, stated: "He was a man of profound learning, and on no subject was his erudition found wanting. The oldest lawyers consulted him, and his advice was law. He showed great kindness and interest in his dealings with young people who had recourse to his superior knowledge."

== Honours ==
- 1836: appointed King's Counsel (which became "Queen's Counsel" on the accession of Queen Victoria);
- 1846: received an honorary degree of Doctor of Laws from Harvard;
- 1862: named a Companion in the Order of the Bath.

== See also ==
- 1st Parliament of the Province of Canada
