= William Bowman Felton =

William Bowman Felton (1782 – June 30, 1837) was a British naval officer, political figure in Lower Canada, and in his time the most influential man at Sherbrooke, Quebec.

He was born in Gloucester, England in 1782. He was the son of John Felton (1752-1796), an officer in the Royal Navy and Governor of the Balearic Islands, by his wife Elizabeth (1765-1833), daughter of John Butt. He was descended from the mentally disturbed Naval officer John Felton, who murdered George Villiers, 1st Duke of Buckingham in 1628.

The Feltons had a long association with the Royal Navy, and William too served with the British fleet in the Mediterranean and at Gibraltar during the Napoleonic Wars. In 1811, he married Anna Maria Valls at Menorca and in 1814 he was appointed British Consul at Livorno. He amassed a considerable fortune as naval storekeeper at Port Mahon, Menorca.

In 1815/16, at the end of the Napoleonic Wars, he came to Lower Canada where he was granted large tracts of land in the Eastern Townships. He brought with him his extended family and settled on property in Ascot Township near Sherbrooke. Felton raised livestock and also leased some of his land. He served in the local militia, becoming lieutenant-colonel, and also served as justice of the peace.

In 1822, he was named to the Legislative Council of Lower Canada. He attempted to establish a colonization company to encourage development of the region, without success. In 1827, he was named Commissioner of crown lands. He was suspended from this position in 1836, after having been accused of improperly selling crown property as if it were his own. There were also some irregularities in land grants issued to his children which had not been resolved at the time of Felton's death on his estate near Sherbrooke in 1837.

== Family ==
William Bowman Felton and his wife Anna Maria Valls of Menorca were the parents of eight children:

- William Locker Pickmore Felton, Q.C. (who died in November, 1877), became a lawyer and politician who represented his native county in Parliament previous to the Canadian Confederation.
- Maria Antonia married, 1839, Sir Percy Arthur Fairlie-Cuningham, 10th Baronet of Castle Robertland. She died in London, England, January 1897, aged 76.
- Eliza Margaret married Thomas Cushing Aylwin, who served in the legislative assembly and was later named a judge.
- Charlotte, died unmarried.
- Frances Lucia married Josiah Hunt, Esquire, of Quebec.
- Matilda Catalina married General Richard Burnaby-Dyott, of Freeford Hall, Colonel-Commandant, Royal Engineers.
- Octavia Sophia married Andrew Wingate McLimont, Esquire, of New York City.
- Isabella Monica married Livingstone E. Morris, of Waterford, Ireland.
