= Collège François-de-Laval =

Location
- 6, rue de la Vieille-Université; Quebec City, Quebec, G1R 5X8; Canada; 46.8154°N 71.2056°W

Information
- Religious affiliation: Roman Catholic
- Founded: 1668
- Directeur Général: Marc Dallaire
- Language: French
- Website: collegefdl.ca

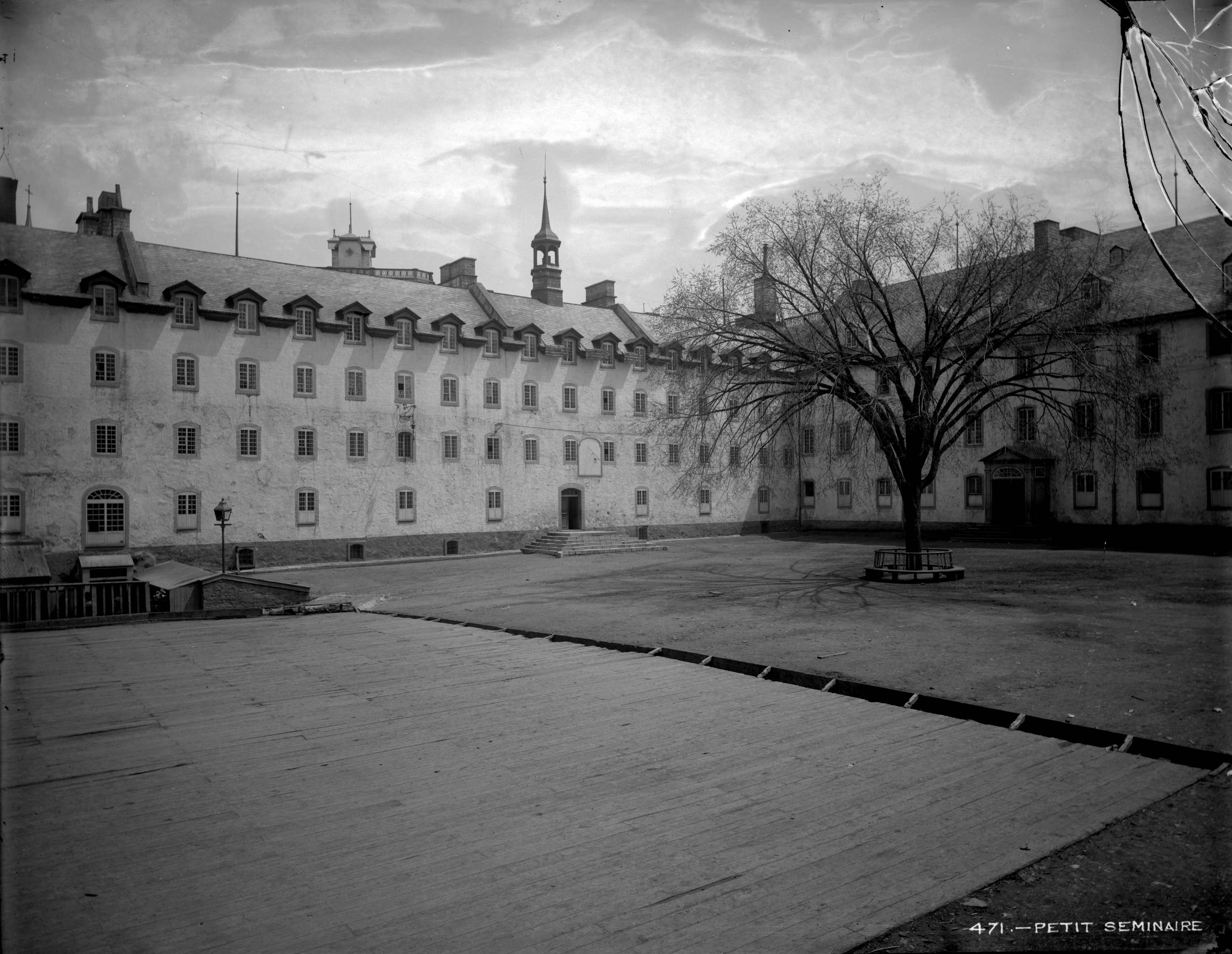
Petit Séminaire, c.1900.

Collège François-de-Laval (French pronunciation: [kɔlɛʒ fʁɑ̃swa də laval]), previously known as the Petit Séminaire de Québec ([pəti seminɛʁ də kebɛk]), is a private French-language Catholic secondary school in Vieux-Québec, Quebec City, Quebec.

== Origins and current status ==
The school was founded in 1668, as part of the Séminaire de Québec. Until 1970, the Superior of the Seminary was also the Rector of Université Laval, which was originally an offshoot of it. In 1985, the seminary transferred the secondary school to a new secular not-for-profit organization, "le Collège François-de-Laval", which was given the right to use the "Petit Séminaire de Québec" name.

Another school, Le Petit Séminaire de Québec, campus de l'Outaouais was founded as a branch of the school in the Outaouais area of western Quebec.

A separate organization with a similar name, the Petit séminaire diocésain de Québec, is a residential school for boys considering the Roman Catholic priesthood, managed by the Séminaire de Québec.

== Background ==
Many French-Canadian clergy of the 18th and 19th century, as well as innumerable academics, went through the Petit Séminaire before higher education became widely accessible.

Of 867 students who lived at the Petit Séminaire during the French period, 198 graduated. Of these, 118 became priests or brothers, and 80 chose other occupations, according to research by historian Mgr Amédée Gosselin.

== Notable graduates ==
- Pierre-Stanislas Bédard, lawyer, journalist, judge, member of the Legislative Assembly of Lower Canada
- Amable Berthelot, member of the Legislative Assembly of Lower Canada and the Legislative Assembly of the Province of Canada
- Michel-Amable Berthelot Dartigny, member of the Legislative Assembly of Lower Canada; lawyer and notary
- Jean Blanchet (physician), member of the Legislative Assembly of Lower Canada and the Legislative Assembly of the Province of Canada; physician
- René-Édouard Caron, lawyer, judge, politician, and second Lieutenant Governor of Quebec
- Pierre-Joseph-Olivier Chauveau (1829–1837), first Premier of Quebec
- Paul Fiset, microbiologist and developer of the Q fever vaccine
- Jean-François Hubert, Bishop of Quebec, 1788–1797
- Thomas Lee (notary), notary and member of the Legislative Assembly of Lower Canada
- Jean-Marie Mondelet, notary and political figure in Lower Canada
- Augustin-Norbert Morin, journalist, lawyer, politician, and Patriote in Lower Canada
- Denis-Benjamin Papineau, Lower Canada politician, co-premier of the Province of Canada
- Louis-Joseph Papineau, Lower Canada politician, lawyer, seigneur, and Patriote leader
- Étienne Parent, Lower Canada journalist, politician, and public servant
- Joseph-François Perrault, businessman and member of the Legislative Assembly of Lower Canada
- Joseph-Xavier Perrault, educator, businessman, and member of the Legislative Assembly of the Province of Canada
- Louis Plamondon (lawyer), Lower Canada lawyer and bon vivant
- Étienne-Paschal Taché, doctor, Patriote, Joint-premier of the Province of Canada, Father of Confederation
