= Jean Blanchet (physician) =

Canadian politician

Jean Blanchet (May 17, 1795 – April 22, 1857) was a medical doctor and political figure in Canada East.

Blanchet was born in Saint-Pierre-de-la-Rivière-du-Sud in 1795. He studied at the Petit Séminaire de Quebec and then studied medicine with his uncle François Blanchet. He completed his medical training in London and Paris; he returned and entered practice in partnership with his uncle. In 1823, he began teaching anatomy at the Emigrant Hospital, later the Marine and Emigrant Hospital. He was a member of the Medical Board of Examiners for Quebec from 1831 to 1848 and helped found the Quebec School of Medicine, later affiliated with the Université Laval. He also taught general pathology and physiology at the Université Laval. He represented Quebec County in the Legislative Assembly of Lower Canada from 1834 to 1838. In 1854, he was elected to the Legislative Assembly of the Province of Canada for Quebec City; he resigned in 1857 due to ill health and died in Quebec City five weeks later.

His nephew, Joseph-Godric Blanchet, became a member of both the House of Commons of Canada and the Legislative Assembly of Quebec.
