= List of battles 1801–1900 =

== 1801-1805 ==
Year	War	Battle	Loc.	Date(s)	Description
1801	French Revolutionary Wars	Action of 19 February 1801	(Spain)	19 Feb	British victory over France
1801	War of the Second Coalition	Battle of Aboukir	(Egypt)	8 March	British-Turkish army under Ralph Abercromby defeats French Army of Egypt under Jacques de Menou
1801	War of the Second Coalition	Battle of Mandora	(Egypt)	13 March	The UK defeats France
1801	War of the Second Coalition	Battle of Alexandria	(Egypt)	21 March	British victory over France
1801	War of the Second Coalition	Siege of El Rahmaniya	(Egypt)	9-10 May	Ottomans and British defeat French in Egypt.
1801	War of the Second Coalition and English Wars	Battle of Copenhagen	(Denmark)	2 April	British commander Nelson defeats Danish fleet
1801	French Revolutionary Wars	Action of 6 May 1801	(Spain)	6 May	British victory over France
1801	French Revolutionary Wars	Action of 24 June 1801	(Libya)	24 June	French victory over the UK
1801	French Revolutionary Wars	Siege of Cairo	(Egypt)	May - 27 June	The UK and the Ottoman Empire capture Cairo from France
1801	French Revolutionary Wars	First Battle of Algeciras	(United Kingdom) / (Spain)	6 July	British Royal Navy defeats by French
1801	French Revolutionary Wars	Second Battle of Algeciras	(United Kingdom) / (Spain)	12 July	British Royal Navy victory over French, Spanish
1801	First Barbary War	Action of 1 August 1801	(Libya) / (Malta)	1 Aug	A US ship defeats Ottoman Tripolitania
1801	War of the Second Coalition	Raids on Boulogne	(France)	4-16 Aug	French victory over the UK
1801	French Revolutionary Wars	Battle of Mahé	(Seychelles)	19 Aug	British victory over France
1801	War of the Second Coalition	Capitulation of Alexandria	(Egypt)	30 Aug	France capitulates to the UK and the Ottoman Empire. End of the French campaign in Egypt and Syria.
1801	French Revolutionary Wars	Siege of Porto Ferrajo	(Italy)	May - 1 Oct	France besieges Porto Ferrajo on the island of Elba, which was defended by Naples and Tuscany, aided by the UK. On 1 October, peace in Europe made an end to the siege. France got Elba without further fighting as a result of the peace treaty.
1802	Haitian Revolution	Battle of Ravine-à-Couleuvres	(Haiti)	23 Feb	France defeats Haitians
1802	Haitian Revolution	Battle of Kellola	(Haiti)	Feb	France defeats Haitians
1802	Haitian Revolution	Battle of Plaisance	(Haiti)	5 March	France defeats Haitians
1802	Haitian Revolution	Battle of Crête-à-Pierrot	(Haiti)	4–24 March	France defeats Haitians
1802	First Barbary War	First Battle of Tripoli Harbor	(Libya)	16 May	Sweden and the USA defeat Ottoman Tripolitania
1802	American Indian Wars and Russian colonization of North America	First Battle of Sitka	(United States)	20 June	Tlingit warriors massacre Russians and Aleut workers, and carry off the women and children.
1802	-	Battle of Poona	(India)	25 Oct	Precursor to the Second Anglo-Maratha War. Holkar defeats the Peshwa of the Maratha Empire and the Scindia Dynasty in a Maratha civil war.
1803	Haitian Revolution and Napoleonic Wars	Blockade of Saint-Domingue	(Haiti)	18 June – 6 Dec	The UK and Haitians defeat France
1803	First Barbary War	Action of 22 June 1803	(Libya)	22 June	The US navy defeats Tripolitania
1803	Haitian Revolution and Napoleonic Wars	Action of 28 June 1803	(Haiti)	28 June	British Royal Navy defeats France
1803	Second Anglo-Maratha War	Siege of Aligarh	(India)	1–4 Sep	The UK captures Aligarh from the Maratha Empire. France helped defend Aligarh.
1803	Second Anglo-Maratha War	Battle of Delhi	(India)	11 Sep	British forces under Gerard Lake defeat Maratha forces led by French officer Louis Bourquin
1803	Second Anglo-Maratha War	Battle of Assaye	(India)	23 Sep	English under Wellesley defeat Marathas under Daulat Scindia in Deccan
1803	Haitian Revolution	Siege of Port-au-Prince	(Haiti)	Oct	Haitians capture Port-au-Prince from France
1803	Second Anglo-Maratha War	Battle of Laswari	(India)	1 Nov	British commander Lake defeats Marathas near Agra
1803	Haitian Revolution	Battle of Vertières	(Haiti)	18 Nov	Haitians defeat French in last battle of war of independence
1803	Second Anglo-Maratha War	Battle of Argaon	(India)	28 Nov	The UK under Wellesley defeats the Maratha Empire under Sindhia
1803	-	Second Ottoman invasion of Mani	(Greece)		Ottomans fail to conquer Mani a second time
1804	Russo-Persian War (1804–1813)	Battle of Ganja (1804)	(Azerbaijan)	22 Nov 1803 – 15 Jan 1804	Russian victory in a battle between Russian Empire and Persian Empire for the control of Ganja citadel.
1804	British colonisation of Australia	Castle Hill convict rebellion	(Australia)	5 March	Irish convict uprising in the New South Wales colony
1804	First Serbian Uprising	Battle of Drlupa	(Serbia)	April	Serbia defeats the Dahije
1804	Napoleonic Wars	Battle of Suriname	(Suriname)	5 May	Battle between the Netherlands and UK for the control of the Surinam colony. The UK captures Surinam.
1804	Fulani War	Battle of Tabkin Kwatto	(Nigeria)	21 June	First decisive battle of Fulani War. The Sokoto Caliphate defeats Gobir.
1804	Russo-Persian War	Battle of Echmiadzin (1804)	(Armenia)	June	Russian forces forced to withdraw by Iranian forces
1804	Russo-Persian War	Siege of Erivan	(Armenia)	July–September 1804	Successful Iranian defense against Georgian and Armenian auxiliaries
1804	First Barbary War	Second Battle of Tripoli Harbor	(Libya)	14 July	Indecisive battle between US and Barbary pirates
1804	Napoleonic Wars	Battle of Vizagapatam	(India)	15 Sep	French defeat British in Bay of Bengal
1804	American Indian Wars and Russian colonization of North America	Second Battle of Sitka	(United States)	1–7 Oct	In reprisal for the 1802 attack, Russian forces defeat the Tlingit in the last major armed conflict between Europeans and Alaska Natives.
1804	Napoleonic Wars	Raid on Boulogne	(France)	2–3 Oct	Minor British victory over France
1804	Napoleonic Wars	Action of 5 October 1804	(Portugal)	5 Oct	British Royal Navy defeats Spain
1804	Second Anglo-Maratha War	Siege of Delhi	(India)	8-19 Oct	Brits and Mughals hold Delhi against the Marathas
1804	Second Anglo-Maratha War	Battle of Farrukhabad	(India)	17 Nov	Maratha forces of Jaswant Rao Holkar defeat British of commander Lake.
1804	Napoleonic Wars	Action of 25 November 1804	(Spain)	25 Nov	British Royal Navy defeats Spain
1804	Napoleonic Wars	Action of 7 December 1804	(Portugal)	7 Dec	British Royal Navy defeats Spain
1804	Fulani War	Battle of Tsuntua	(Nigeria)	December	Gobir defeat Sokoto Caliphate.
1805	Second Anglo-Maratha War	Siege of Bharatpur (1805)	(India)	2 Jan – 22 Feb	The UK fails to capture Bharatpur, Rajasthan, capital of the Bharatpur State.
1805	First Barbary War	Battle of Derne	(Libya)	27 April – 13 May	US victory against Ottoman Tripolitania
1805	War of the Third Coalition	Battle of Diamond Rock	(Martinique)	31 May - 2 June	France and Spain capture Diamond Rock from the UK
1805	Napoleonic Wars	Action of 15 July 1805	(France)	15 July	The French Navy defeats the UK
1805	War of the Third Coalition	Battle of Blanc-Nez and Gris-Nez	(France)	18 July	A Batavian-French flotilla under Ver Huell repulses an attack by a superior British force
1805	War of the Third Coalition	Battle of Cape Finisterre	(Spain)	22 July	Inconclusive naval battle between the UK and a coalition of France and Spain
1805	War of the Third Coalition	Action of 10 August 1805	(Spain)	10 Aug	British Royal Navy defeats France
1805	First Serbian Uprising	Battle of Ivankovac	(Serbia)	18 Aug	Serbian rebels defeated Ottoman Army
1805	War of the Third Coalition and Napoleonic Wars	Ulm Campaign	(Germany)	25 Sep – 20 Oct	
1805	War of the Third Coalition	Battle of Donauwörth	(Germany)	7 Oct	France defeats Austria
1805	War of the Third Coalition	Battle of Wertingen	(Germany)	8 Oct	France defeats Austria
1805	War of the Third Coalition	Battle of Günzburg	(Germany)	9 Oct	France defeats Austria
1805	War of the Third Coalition	Battle of Haslach-Jungingen	(Germany)	11 Oct	France defeats Austria
1805	War of the Third Coalition	Battle of Memmingen	(Germany)	14 Oct	France defeats Austria
1805	War of the Third Coalition	Battle of Elchingen	(Germany)	14 Oct	French Army under Marshal Michel Ney defeats Austrian Army
1805	War of the Third Coalition	Battle of Nerenstetten	(Germany)	16 Oct	France defeats Austria
1805	War of the Third Coalition	Battle of Ulm	(Germany)	16–19 Oct	Napoleon forces surrender of Austrian Army under Baron von Leiberich
1805	War of the Third Coalition	Battle of Verona (1805)	(Italy)	18 Oct	France defeats Austria
1805	War of the Third Coalition	Battle of Trafalgar	(Spain)	21 Oct	The UK under Nelson defeats France under Villeneuve, signals "England expects every man to do his duty", Nelson killed
1805	War of the Third Coalition	Battle of Caldiero	(Italy)	30 Oct	French forces under Masséna defeat Austrians in Italy under Archduke Charles of Austria
1805	War of the Third Coalition	Battle of Mehrnbach	(Austria)	30 Oct	France defeats Austria
1805	War of the Third Coalition	Battle of Lambach	(Austria)	31 Oct	France defeats Russia and Austria
1805	War of the Third Coalition	Battle of Cape Ortegal	(Spain)	4 Nov	British Royal Navy defeats France
1805	War of the Third Coalition	Battle of Steyr	(Austria)	4 Nov	France defeats Austria and Russia
1805	War of the Third Coalition	Battle of Amstetten	(Austria)	5 Nov	Inconclusive battle between France and a coalition of Austria and Russia
1805	Napoleonic Wars	Battle of Mariazell	(Austria)	8 Nov	France defeats Austria
1805	War of the Third Coalition	Battle of Dürenstein	(Austria)	11 Nov	Inconclusive battle between France and a coalition of Russia and Austria
1805	War of the Third Coalition	Battle of Schöngrabern	(Austria)	16 Nov	Pyotr Bagration commands Russian and Austrian forces against Murat and Napoléon. French victory.
1805	War of the Third Coalition	Battle of Castelfranco Veneto	(Italy)	24 Nov	France defeats Austria
1805	War of the Third Coalition	Battle of Wischau	(Czech Republic)	25 Nov	Russia defeats France
1805	War of the Third Coalition	Battle of Austerlitz	(Czech Republic)	2 Dec	French Army, under Napoleon, victory against Russian Army and any Austrians troops. End of War of the Third Coalition.
1805	Franco-Haitian War	Siege of Santo Domingo	(Dominican Republic)		Haitians withdraw from French occupied Santo Domingo

== 1806-1810 ==
Year	War	Battle	Loc.	Date(s)	Description
1806	Napoleonic Wars	Battle of Blaauwberg	(South Africa)	8 Jan	British beat the Dutch near Cape Town, establishing British rule in South Africa.
1806	Napoleonic Wars	Battle of San Domingo	(Dominican Republic) / (Haiti)	6 Feb	British Royal Navy defeats France
1806	War of the Third Coalition	Battle of Campo Tenese	(Italy)	10 March	France defeats Naples
1806	War of the Third Coalition	Action of 13 March 1806	(Spain)	18 March	British Royal Navy defeats France
1806	War of the Third Coalition	Battle of Maida	(Italy)	4 July	The UK defeats France
1806	War of the Third Coalition	Siege of Gaeta	(Italy)	26 Feb - 18 July	France captures Gaeta from Naples
1806	Janissary revolts	1806 Edirne incident	(Turkey)	July-September	Janissary victory, a major blow for the sultan's ambitions of centralization and reform.
1806	Napoleonic Wars	Action of 26 July 1806	(Indonesia)	26 July	British Royal Navy defeats the Kingdom of Holland.
1806	War of the Third Coalition	Massacre of Lauria	(Italy)	7–8 Aug	French troops under Masséna besiege and destroy Lauria, southern Italy. The citizens of Lauria were against the French occupation of the Kingdom of Naples.
1806	First Serbian Uprising	Battle of Mišar	(Serbia)	12–15 Aug	Serbs defeated bigger Ottoman Army in Serbia
1806	Napoleonic Wars	Action of 23 August 1806	(Cuba)	23 Aug	British Royal Navy defeats Spain
1806	Napoleonic Wars	Battle of Herceg Novi	(Montenegro)	30 Sep	Russia and Montenegro defeat France
1806	Napoleonic Wars	Siege of Ragusa	(Croatia)	27 May - 1 Oct	France captures Ragusa, present-day Dubrovnik, which was the end of the Republic of Ragusa. Ragusa was defended by Russia and Montenegro.
1806	War of the Fourth Coalition	Battle of Schleiz	(Germany)	9 Oct	France defeats Prussia and Saxony
1806	War of the Fourth Coalition	Battle of Saalfeld	(Germany)	10 Oct	France defeats Prussia and Saxony
1806	War of the Fourth Coalition	Battles of Jena and Auerstedt	(Germany)	14 Oct	French Army, under Davout and Napoleon, defeats Prussian Army in two separate battles. The city of Berlin was taken by the French troops.
1806	War of the Fourth Coalition	Battle of Halle	(Germany)	17 Oct	France defeats Prussia
1806	Napoleonic Wars	Action of 18 October 1806	(Indonesia)	18 Oct	British Royal Navy defeats the Kingdom of Holland
1806	War of the Fourth Coalition	Battle of Prenzlau	(Germany)	28 Oct	France defeats Prussia
1806	War of the Fourth Coalition	Battle of Waren-Nossentin	(Germany)	1 Nov	Prussia defeats France
1806	War of the Fourth Coalition	Battle of Lübeck	(Germany)	6 Nov	France defeats Prussia and Sweden
1806	Napoleonic Wars	Raid on Batavia	(Indonesia)	27 Nov	British Royal Navy defeats the Kingdom of Holland.
1806	War of the Fourth Coalition	Battle of Czarnowo	(Poland)	23 Dec	France defeats Russia and Prussia
1806	War of the Fourth Coalition	Battle of Pułtusk	(Poland)	26 Dec	Indecisive battle between Napoleon and Russians
1806	War of the Fourth Coalition	Battle of Golymin	(Poland)	26 Dec	France defeats Russia
1806	First Serbian Uprising	Battle of Deligrad	(Serbia)	Dec	Big battle between Serbian rebels and Ottomans forces in which Serbs won.
1806	-	Edirne incident	(Turkey)		Standoff between Ottoman troops and Balkan janissaries
1807	Anglo-Spanish War	Battle of Cardal	(Uruguay)	20 Jan	UK defeats Spain
1807	War of the Fourth Coalition	Battle of Mohrungen	(Poland)	25 Jan	French defeat Russians and Prussians
1807	War of the Fourth Coalition	Battle of Allenstein	(Poland)	3 Feb	France defeats Russia
1807	Anglo-Spanish War	Battle of Montevideo	(Uruguay)	3 Feb	The UK defeats Spain
1807	Afghan-Sikh Wars	Battle of Kasur	(Pakistan)		Sikh Empire captures Kasur from the Durrani.
1807	War of the Fourth Coalition	Battle of Eylau	(Russia)	8 Feb	Napoleon fights a hard-won bloodbath with Russians, no decisive result
1807	War of the Fourth Coalition	Battle of Ostrołęka (1807)	(Poland)	16 Feb	French defeat Russians
1807	Anglo-Turkish War	Dardanelles Operation	(Turkey)	19 Feb	A failed British attempt against the coastal fortifications of the Ottoman capital of Constantinople
1807	Anglo-Turkish War	Battle of Rosetta	(Egypt)	21 April	Ottoman victory
1807	Franco-Swedish War and War of the Fourth Coalition	Great Sortie of Stralsund	(Germany)	1–3 April	Sweden pushes the French Army out of Swedish Pomerania
1807	Russo-Turkish War	Battle of the Dardanelles	(Turkey)	10–11 May	Ottoman fleet fails to break the Russian blockade of Istanbul
1807	War of the Fourth Coalition	Siege of Danzig	(Poland)	19 March - 24 May	France captures Danzig, now Gdańsk, from Prussia. Prussia was aided by Russia and the UK.
1807	War of the Fourth Coalition	Battle of Mileto	(Italy)	28 May	France defeats Bourbon Naples and Sicily
1807	Anglo-Spanish War	Action of 2 June 1807	(Uruguay)	2 June	The Spanish Navy defeats the UK
1807	War of the Fourth Coalition	Battle of Guttstadt-Deppen	(Poland)	5–6 June	Russia defeats France
1807	War of the Fourth Coalition	Battle of Heilsberg	(Poland)	10 June	Napoleon repulses Russian attack
1807	War of the Fourth Coalition	Battle of Friedland	(Russia)	14 June	French Army, under Napoleon, decisively defeats Russians under Bennigsen. End of the War of the Fourth Coalition.
1807	Russo-Turkish War	Battle of Arpachai	(Armenia)	18 June	Russians defeat Ottomans
1807	Russo-Turkish War	Battle of Athos	(Greece)	19–29 June	Russian fleet under Admiral Seniavin defeats Ottoman fleet in Aegean Sea
1807	War of the Fourth Coalition	Siege of Kolberg	(Poland)	20 March - 2 July	France besieged Prussian Kolberg, now Kołobrzeg, until peace on 2 July. Prussia was aided by the UK and Sweden.
1807	Napoleonic Wars	Battle of Miserere	(Argentina)	2 July	The UK defeats Spain
1807	Anglo-Spanish War	Battle of the Retiro	(Argentina)	5 July	The UK defeats Spain
1807	Franco-Swedish War	Siege of Stralsund	(Germany)	24 July - 24 Aug	France and Spain capture Stralsund from Sweden. This is the end of Swedish Pomerania.
1807	Gunboat War and Napoleonic Wars	Battle of Køge	(Denmark)	29 Aug	The UK defeats Denmark-Norway
1807	Gunboat War and Napoleonic Wars	Second Battle of Copenhagen	(Denmark)	2–7 Sep	UK land, sea forces under Admiral Gambier and General Cathcart capture Danish fleet.
1807	Anglo-Turkish War	Alexandria expedition of 1807	(Egypt)	18 March - 25 Sep	Failed UK attempt to capture Alexandria. Viceroy Muhammad Ali Pasha accepts to formally keep Egypt within the Ottoman Empire.
1807	War of the Fourth Coalition	Siege of Graudenz	(Poland)	22 Jan - 11 Dec	France fails to capture Graudenz, now Grudziądz, from Prussia
1807	Napoleonic Wars	Raid on Griessie	(Indonesia)	5-11 Dec	British Royal Navy defeats the Kingdom of Holland.
1807	-	Battle of Hingakaka	(New Zealand)		Largest battle ever fought on New Zealand soil. Tainui victory.
1807	-	Third Ottoman invasion of Mani	(Greece)		Ottomans fail to capture Mani for a final time
1808	English Wars and Napoleonic Wars	Battle of Zealand Point	(Denmark)	22 March	The UK defeats Denmark-Norway.
1808	Napoleonic Wars	Action of 4 April 1808	(Spain)	4 April	British Royal Navy defeats Spain
1808	Finnish War	Battle of Pyhäjoki	(Finland)	16 April	Russia defeats Sweden
1808	Dano-Swedish War of 1808–1809	Battle of Lier	(Norway)	18 April	Sweden defeats Denmark-Norway
1808	Finnish War	Battle of Siikajoki	(Finland)	18 April	Swedish commander Döbeln halts Russian advance during Finnish War
1808	Dano-Swedish War of 1808–1809	Battle of Toverud	(Norway)	19–20 April	Denmark-Norway defeats Sweden
1808	Dano-Swedish War of 1808–1809	Battle of Rødenes	(Norway)	20 April – 7 May	Norwegians pushes the Swedish Army out of Norway
1808	Dano-Swedish War of 1808–1809	Battle of Trangen	(Norway)	25 April	Denmark-Norway defeats Sweden
1808	Finnish War	Battle of Revolax	(Finland)	27 April	Swedish force defeats Russians camped in Finnish town
1808	Dano-Swedish War of 1808–1809	Battle of Furuholm	(Sweden)	28 April	Sweden defeats Denmark-Norway
1808	Finnish War	Battle of Pulkkila	(Finland)	2 May	Swedish force annihilates Russian force
1808	Finnish War	Battle of Kumlinge	(Finland)	9 or 10 May	Swedish peasants defeat a Russian Army force
1808	Finnish War	Battle of Kuopio	(Finland)	12 May	Sweden defeats Russia
1808	Gunboat War	Battle of Alvøen	(Norway)	16 May	Inconclusive naval battle between Denmark-Norway and the UK
1808	Dano-Swedish War of 1808–1809	Battle of Mobekk	(Norway)	18 May	Sweden defeats Denmark-Norway
1808	Peninsular War	Battle of Valdepeñas	(Spain)	6 June	Inconclusive battle between France and Spain
1808	Peninsular War	Battle of Alcolea Bridge	(Spain)	7 June	France defeats Spain
1808	Gunboat War	Battle of Saltholm	(Denmark)	9 June	The navy of Denmark-Norway defeats the UK
1808	Dano-Swedish War of 1808–1809	Battle of Prestebakke	(Norway)	10 June	Denmark-Norway defeats Sweden
1808	Peninsular War	Battle of Cabezón	(Spain)	12 June	France defeats Spain
1808	Peninsular War	Battle of El Bruc	(Spain)	6 and 14 June	French forces torch buildings after previous attempt foiled by ambush by Spain. Spanish victory.
1808	Peninsular War	Capture of the Rosily Squadron	(Spain)	9–14 June	Spain captures six French warships in the port of Cádiz
1808	Finnish War	Battle of Lemo	(Finland)	19–20 June	Russia defeats Sweden
1808	Peninsular War	Battle of Girona	(Spain)	20 and 21 June	Spain defeats France
1808	Finnish War	Battle of Nykarleby	(Finland)	24 June	Sweden defeats Russia
1808	Finnish War	Battle of Vaasa	(Finland)	25–26 June	Russia defeats Sweden
1808	Peninsular War	Battle of Valencia	(Spain)	26–28 June	France fails to capture Valencia from Spain
1808	Finnish War	Battle of Rimito Kramp	(Finland)	30 June - 2 July	Tactical victory but strategic failure of the Swedish Navy versus Russia
1808	Finnish War	Battle of Lintulaks	(Finland)	3 July	Russia defeats Sweden
1808	Finnish War	Battle of Kokonsaari	(Finland)	11 July	Russia defeats Sweden
1808	Finnish War	Battle of Lapua	(Finland)	14 July	Swedish victory over Russia during Finnish War
1808	Peninsular War	Battle of Medina de Rioseco	(Spain)	14 July	French victory over Spain
1808	Peninsular War	Battle of Bailén	(Spain)	16–19 July	French General Dupont surrenders to Spanish rebel forces
1808	Peninsular War	Battle of Évora	(Portugal)	29 July	France defeats Portugal and Spain
1808	Finnish War	Battle of Sandöström	(Finland)	2–3 Aug	Russia defeats Sweden
1808	Finnish War	Battle of Pälkjärvi	(Russia)	10 Aug	Sweden defeats Russia
1808	Finnish War	Battle of Kauhajoki	(Finland)	10 Aug	Swedish commander Döbeln defeats the Russians
1808	Peninsular War	First Siege of Zaragoza	(Spain)	15 June – 13 Aug	Unsuccessful French attempt to capture Zaragoza, Spain
1808	Peninsular War	Siege of Girona	(Spain)	24 July - 16 Aug	France fails to capture Girona from Spain
1808	Finnish War	Battle of Alavus	(Finland)	17 Aug	Sweden defeats Russia
1808	Peninsular War	Battle of Roliça	(Portugal)	17 Aug	British-Portuguese victory over France
1808	Peninsular War	Battle of Vimeiro	(Portugal)	21 Aug	British, Portuguese forces under Wellesley defeat French under Junot
1808	Finnish War	Battle of Karstula	(Finland)	21 Aug	Russia defeats Sweden
1808	Finnish War	Battle of Nummijärvi	(Finland)	28 Aug	Sweden defeats Russia
1808	Finnish War	Battle of Lappfjärd	(Finland)	29 Aug	Sweden defeats Russia
1808	Finnish War	Battle of Grönvikssund	(Finland)	30 Aug	The Swedish Navy defeats Russia
1808	Finnish War	Battle of Ruona-Salmi	(Finland)	1-2 Sep	Sweden defeats Russia at Ruona and Russia defeats Sweden at Salmi
1808	Dano-Swedish War of 1808–09	Battle of Berby	(Norway)	12 Sep	Battle between Sweden and Denmark-Norway with a disputed outcome
1808	Finnish War	Battle of Jutas	(Finland)	13 Sep	Swedes under Döbeln intercept and defeat Russians
1808	Finnish War	Battle of Oravais	(Finland)	14 Sep	Russian forces overwhelm Swedish Army
1808	Finnish War	Battle of Lokalaks	(Finland)	17-18 Sep	Russia defeats Sweden
1808	Finnish War	Battle of Palva Sund	(Finland)	18 Sep	The Russian Navy defeats Sweden
1808	Finnish War	Helsinki village landing	(Finland)	26-28 Sep	Russia defeats Sweden
1808	Finnish War	Battle of Koljonvirta	(Finland)	27 Oct	Swedish victory over Russia following a month-long cease-fire
1808	Peninsular War	Battle of Zornoza	(Spain)	31 Oct	Indecisive battle between French and Spanish
1808	Peninsular War	Battle of Valmaseda	(Spain)	5 Nov	Minor Spanish victory over France
1808	Peninsular War	Battle of Burgos	(Spain)	10 Nov	French victory over Spain
1808	Peninsular War	Battle of Espinosa de los Monteros	(Spain)	10–11 Nov	French victory, Spanish forces escape
1808	Peninsular War	Battle of Tudela	(Spain)	23 Nov	French Marshal Lannes defeats Spanish General Castaños
1808	Peninsular War	Battle of Somosierra	(Spain)	30 Nov	Napoleon defeats Spanish commander Benito de San Juan.
1808	Peninsular War	Battle of Cardedeu	(Spain)	16 Dec	France defeats Spain
1808	Peninsular War	Battle of Molins de Rei	(Spain)	21 Dec	France defeats Spain
1808	Peninsular War	Battle of Sahagún	(Spain)	21 Dec	British cavalry defeat French cavalry
1808	Peninsular War	Battle of Benavente	(Spain)	29 Dec	The UK defeats France
1808	Peninsular War	Battle of Mansilla	(Spain)	30 Dec	France defeats Spain
1809	Peninsular War	Battle of Castellón	(Spain)	1 Jan	Spain defeats France
1809	Peninsular War	Battle of Uclés	(Spain)	13 Jan	France defeats Spain
1809	Travancore rebellion	Battle of Quilon	(India)	15 Jan	British East India Company defeats the army of Travancore
1809	Peninsular War	Battle of Corunna	(Spain)	16 Jan	French defeat British commander Sir John Moore
1809	Peninsular War	Siege of Zaragoza	(Spain)	19 Dec 1808 - 20 Feb 1809	France captures Zaragoza from Spain.
1809	Napoleonic Wars	Battle of Les Sables-d'Olonne	(France)	24 Feb	British Royal Navy defeats France
1809	Jihad of Usman dan Fodio	Battle of Alkalawa	(Nigeria)	24 Feb	Usman dan Fodio defeats and kills Yunfa.
1809	Peninsular War	Battle of Valls	(Spain)	25 Feb	France defeats Spain
1809	Peninsular War	Battle of Villafranca	(Spain)	17 March	Spain defeats France
1809	Peninsular War	Battle of Braga	(Portugal)	20 March	France defeats Portugal
1809	Peninsular War	Battle of Miajadas	(Spain)	21 March	Spain defeats France
1809	Peninsular War	Battle of Los Yébenes	(Spain)	24 March	Army of the Duchy of Warsaw successfully withdraws from Spanish Army
1809	Peninsular War	Battle of Ciudad Real	(Spain)	27 March	French forces under General Sabastiani defeat Spanish Army commanded by General Cartojal
1809	Peninsular War	First Battle of Porto	(Portugal)	28 March	French forces under Marshal Soult capture the city of Porto from the Portuguese
1809	Peninsular War	Battle of Medellín	(Spain)	28 March	France defeats Spain
1809	Peninsular War	Battle of Porto	(Portugal)	29 March	France defeats Portugal and captures Porto
1809	War of the Fifth Coalition	Battle of Sacile	(Italy)	16 April	French forces under Eugène de Beauharnais defeated in Italy by Austrians under Archduke John
1809	Napoleonic Wars	Battle of the Basque Roads	(France)	18–24 April	British commanders Admiral Gambier and Thomas Cochrane defeat French Atlantic Fleet
1809	War of the Fifth Coalition	Battle of Teugen-Hausen	(Germany)	19 April	France defeats Austria
1809	Austro-Polish War and War of the Fifth Coalition	Battle of Raszyn	(Poland)	19 April	Duchy of Warsaw defeats Austria.
1809	War of the Fifth Coalition	Battle of Abensberg	(Germany)	19–20 April	Napoleon defeats Austrians in Germany under Archduke Charles
1809	War of the Fifth Coalition	Battle of Landshut	(Germany)	21 April	French Marshal Masséna unable to destroy Austrian left wing under Hiller
1809	War of the Fifth Coalition	Battle of Eckmühl	(Germany)	22 April	Napoleon defeats Austrian Archduke Charles, forcing him to withdraw from Bavaria
1809	War of the Fifth Coalition	Battle of Ratisbon	(Germany)	23 April	Austrian Archduke Charles makes good retreat in successful rearguard action against France
1809	War of the Fifth Coalition	Battle of Neumarkt-Sankt Veit	(Germany)	24 April	Austria defeats France
1809	Austro-Polish War and War of the Fifth Coalition	Battle of Radzymin	(Poland)	25 April	Poles of the French-controlled Duchy of Warsaw defeat Austria
1809	Austro-Polish War and War of the Fifth Coalition	Battle of Grochów	(Poland)	26 April	The Duchy of Warsaw defeats Austria
1809	War of the Fifth Coalition	Battle of Caldiero	(Italy)	27–30 April	Austria defeats France
1809	Napoleonic Wars	Battle of Kock	(Poland)	2 May	The Duchy of Warsaw defeats Austria
1809	Austro-Polish War and War of the Fifth Coalition	Battle of Ostrówek	(Poland)	2–3 May	The French-controlled Duchy of Warsaw defeats Austria
1809	War of the Fifth Coalition	Battle of Ebelsberg	(Austria)	3 May	France defeats Austria
1809	War of the Fifth Coalition	Battle of Piave River	(Italy)	8 May	France defeats Austria
1809	Peninsular War	Battle of Grijó	(Portugal)	10–11 May	The UK and Portugal defeat France
1809	Peninsular War	Second Battle of Porto	(Portugal)	12 May	A coalition of the UK and Portugal under Wellesley defeats Soult, drives French from city
1809	War of the Fifth Coalition	Battle of Wörgl	(Austria)	13 May	France defeats Austria
1809	Peninsular War	Battle of Alcantara	(Spain)	14 May	France defeats Portugal
1809	Finnish War	Battle of Skellefteå	(Sweden)	15 May	Russia defeats Sweden
1809	War of the Fifth Coalition	Battle of Linz-Urfahr	(Austria)	17 May	France defeats Austria
1809	War of the Fifth Coalition	Battle of Tarvis	(Italy)	15–18 May	France defeats Austria
1809	War of the Fifth Coalition	Battle of Aspern-Essling	(Austria)	21–22 May	Napoleon's first attempt to cross Danube near Vienna results in serious check by Austrians under Archduke Charles
1809	Peninsular War	Battle of Alcañiz	(Spain)	23 May	Spanish defeat French
1809	Napoleonic Wars	Battle of Sankt Michael	(Austria)	25 May	France defeats Austria
1809	Dano-Swedish War of 1808–1809 and Franco-Swedish War	Battle of Stralsund (1809)	(Germany)	31 May	France defeats Prussia and Sweden
1809	Peninsular War	Battle of Puente Sanpayo	(Spain)	7–9 June	Spain defeats France
1809	First Serbian Uprising	Battle of Suvodol	(Serbia)	10 June	Serbia defeats the Ottoman Empire
1809	Austro-Polish War	Battle of Jedlińsk	(Poland)	11 June	Austria defeats the French-controlled Duchy of Warsaw
1809	War of the Fifth Coalition	Battle of Raab	(Hungary)	14 June	France defeats Austria
1809	Peninsular War	Battle of María	(Spain)	15 June	France defeats Spain
1809	Peninsular War	Battle of Belchite (1809)	(Spain)	18 June	France defeats Spain
1809	War of the Fifth Coalition	Battle of Graz	(Austria)	24–26 June	France defeats Austria
1809	Durrani Civil Wars	Battle of Nimla	(Afghanistan)	Late June-Early July	Mahmud Shah Durrani seizes the Durrani throne after winning a battle against Shah Shujah Durrani.
1809	Finnish War	Battle of Hörnefors	(Sweden)	5 July	Russia defeats Sweden
1809	War of the Fifth Coalition	Battle of Wagram	(Austria)	5–6 July	French Army, under Napoleon, defeats Austrians of Archduke Charles of Austria at great cost, ending the War of the Fifth Coalition
1809	War of the Fifth Coalition	Battle of Gefrees	(Germany)	8 July	Austria and the Principality of Brunswick-Wolfenbüttel defeat France
1809	War of the Fifth Coalition	Battle of Hollabrunn (1809)	(Austria)	9 July	Austria defeats France
1809	War of the Fifth Coalition	Battle of Znaim	(Czech Republic)	10–11 July	Battle between Austria and France ends with the arrival of Napoleon with news of an armistice
1809	Dano-Swedish War of 1808–1809	Battle of Hjerpe Skans	(Sweden)	16 July	Denmark-Norway defeats Sweden
1809	Peninsular War	Battle of Talavera	(Spain)	27–28 July	The UK and Spain under Wellesley defeat forces of French Gen. Victor, King Joseph Bonaparte in Spain; made Viscount Wellington
1809	War of the Fifth Coalition	Battle of Halberstadt	(Germany)	29–30 July	The Principality of Brunswick-Wolfenbüttel defeats the army of the French-controlled Kingdom of Westphalia.
1809	War of the Fifth Coalition	Battle of Ölper (1809)	(Germany)	1 Aug	Draw between the Principality of Brunswick-Wolfenbüttel and the Kingdom of Westphalia.
1809	Peninsular War	Battle of Arzobispo	(Spain)	8 Aug	France defeats Spain
1809	Peninsular War	Battle of Almonacid	(Spain)	11 Aug	France defeats Spain
1809	Peninsular War	Battle of Puerto de Baños	(Spain)	12 Aug	France defeats Portugal, Spain and the UK
1809	Finnish War	Battle of Ratan and Sävar	(Sweden)	17–22 Aug	Swedish General Wachtmeister defeats Russians near Umeå
1809	Finnish War	Battle of Piteå	(Sweden)	25 Aug	Russia defeats Sweden
1809	Peninsular War	Battle of Tamames	(Spain)	18 Oct	Spanish repel French Marshal Ney's forces
1809	Tyrolean Rebellion	Battles of Bergisel	(Austria)	12 April - 1 Nov	France and Bavaria defeat Tyrolean militia.
1809	Peninsular War	Battle of Ocaña	(Spain)	19 Nov	Spanish forces under Aréizaga crushed by French forces of King Joseph, Marshal Soult
1809	Peninsular War	Battle of Carpio	(Spain)	23 Nov	Spain defeats France
1809	Peninsular War	Battle of Alba de Tormes	(Spain)	26 Nov	France defeats Spain
1809	Peninsular War	Siege of Girona	(Spain)	6 May - 12 Dec	France captures Girona from Spain
1809	War of the Fifth Coalition	Walcheren Campaign	(Netherlands)	30 July - 23 Dec	Unsuccessful British invasion of French-controlled Holland
1810	Peninsular War	Battle of Mollet	(Spain)	21 Jan	Spain defeats France
1810		Battle of the Tiger's Mouth	(China)	Sep 1809 - Jan 1810	The Portuguese navy defeats the Red Flag Fleet of Cheung Po Tsai.
1810	Peninsular War	Siege of Cádiz	(Spain)	5 Feb 1810 - 24 Aug 1812	France fails to capture Cádiz from Spain
1810	Peninsular War	Battle of Vic	(Spain)	20 Feb	France defeats Spain
1810	Peninsular War	Battle of Manresa	(Spain)	21 March - 5 April	Spain defeats France
1810	Peninsular War	Siege of Hostalric	(Spain)	11 Jan - 13 May	France captures Hostalric from Spain.
1810	Peninsular War	Siege of Ciudad Rodrigo	(Spain)	26 April - 10 July	France captures Ciudad Rodrigo from Spain
1810	Gunboat War	Battle of Silda	(Norway)	23 July	British Royal Navy defeats Denmark-Norway
1810	Napoleonic Wars	Battle of Grand Port	(France)	20–27 Aug	The French force the British Royal Navy fleet to surrender
1810	Russo-Turkish War	Battle of Batin	(Bulgaria)	9 Sep	Russia defeats the Ottoman Empire
1810	Napoleonic Wars	Action of 13 September 1810	(France)	13 Sep	Inconclusive naval battle between France and the UK
1810	Peninsular War	Battle of La Bisbal	(Spain)	14 Sep	Spain and the UK defeat France
1810	Napoleonic Wars	Action of 18 September 1810	(France)	18 Sep	British Royal Navy defeats France
1810	Peninsular War	Battle of Buçaco	(Portugal)	27 Sep	The UK and Portugal under Wellington repulses attacks from French commander Masséna, withdraws into Lines of Torres Vedras
1810	Peninsular War	Battle of Sobral	(Portugal)	13–14 Oct	The UK and Portugal defeat France
1810	Peninsular War	Battle of Fuengirola	(Spain)	15 Oct	Polish in French service defeat British and Spanish
1810	Bolivian War of Independence and Argentine War of Independence	Battle of Cotagaita	(Bolivia)	27 Oct	Spain defeats the United Provinces of the Río de la Plata
1810	Mexican War of Independence	Battle of Monte de las Cruces	(Mexico)	30 Oct	Mexican insurgents defeat Spain
1810	Peninsular War	Battle of Baza	(Spain)	4 Nov	France defeats Spain
1810	Bolivian War of Independence and Argentine War of Independence	Battle of Suipacha	(Bolivia)	7 Nov	The United Provinces of the Río de la Plata defeat Spain
1810	Spanish American wars of independence	Battle of Campichuelo	(Paraguay)	19 Dec	Revolutionary Argentinian forces defeats Spanish Royalist troops.
1810	Mexican War of Independence	Battle of El Veladero	(Mexico)		Mexicans defeat Spanish

== 1811-1815 ==
Year	War	Battle	Loc.	Date(s)	Description
1811	Slave rebellions in the US	German Coast uprising	(United States)	8-10 Jan	Rebellion suppressed
1811	Peninsular War	Battle of El Pla	(Spain)	15 Jan	Spain defeats France
1811	Mexican War of Independence	Battle of Calderón Bridge	(Mexico)	17 Jan	Spanish victory against a large Mexican force
1811	Spanish American wars of independence	Battle of Paraguarí	(Paraguay)	19 Jan	Revolutionary Argentinian forces are defeated by Spanish Royalist troops
1811	Peninsular War	Battle of the Gebora	(Spain)	19 Feb	France defeats Spain and Portugal
1811	Peninsular War	Battle of Barrosa	(Spain)	5 March	The UK, Spain and Portugal defeat France
1811	Spanish American wars of independence	Battle of Tacuarí	(Paraguay)	9 March	Revolutionary Argentinian forces are defeated by Spanish Royalist troops
1811	Peninsular War	Battle of Pombal	(Portugal)	11 March	France defeats the UK and Portugal
1811	Peninsular War	Battle of Redinha	(Portugal)	12 March	Indecisive battle between France and a coalition of the UK and Portugal
1811	Napoleonic Wars	Battle of Lissa	(Croatia)	13 March	British fleet defeats French fleet
1811	Peninsular War	Battle of Foz de Arouce	(Portugal)	15 March	The UK and Portugal defeat France
1811	Peninsular War	Battle of Campo Maior	(Portugal)	25 March	The UK and Portugal defeat France
1811	Napoleonic Wars	Battle of Anholt	(Denmark)	27 March	British Royal Navy victory over Denmark and Norway
1811	-	Battle of Khakeekera	(Qatar)	March	Bahraini-Kuwaiti victory against Saudi Diriyah forces.
1811	Mexican War of Independence	Battle of Puerto de Piñones	(Mexico)	1 April	Precursor to Battle of Zacatecas. Mexican rebels defeat Spain.
1811	Peninsular War	Battle of Sabugal	(Portugal)	3 April	Anglo-Portuguese victory over French
1811	Mexican War of Independence	Battle of Zacatecas	(Mexico)	15 April	Mexicans capture Zacatecas from Spain
1811	Mexican War of Independence	Battle of El Maguey	(Mexico)	2 May	Spain defeats Mexican rebels
1811	Peninsular War	Battle of Fuentes de Oñoro	(Spain)	5 May	Victory of the UK and Portugal under Wellington against the French under Masséna
1811	Peninsular War	Siege of Tarragona	(Spain)	5 May	29 June – French victory against Spain
1811	Peninsular War	Battle of Albuera	(Spain)	16 May	Draw of British, Portuguese and Spanish under Beresford and France under Soult
1811	Napoleonic Wars	Battle of Tamatave	(Madagascar)	20 May	British Royal Navy defeats France
1811	Peninsular War	Battle of Arlabán	(Spain)	25 May	Spanish guerillas defeat France
1811	Peninsular War	Battle of Usagre	(Spain)	25 May	The UK, Portugal and Spain defeat France
1811	Peninsular War	Siege of Badajoz	(Spain)	22 April - 10 June	The UK and Portugal fail to capture Badajoz from France
1811	Bolivian War of Independence	Battle of Huaqui	(Bolivia)	20 June	Revolutionary Argentinian forces are defeated by Spanish Royalist troops
1811	Peninsular War	Battle of Cogorderos	(Spain)	23 June	Spain defeats France
1811	Mexican War of Independence	Battle of Llanos de Santa Juana	(Mexico)	12 July	Spanish victory, but the state Colima is later taken by the Mexicans
1811	Peninsular Wars	Battle of Montserrat	(Spain)	25 July	France defeats Spain
1811	Peninsular Wars	Battle of Zújar	(Spain)	9 Aug	France defeats Spain
1811	Peninsular Wars	Siege of Figueras	(Spain)	4 April - 19 Aug	France captures Figueres from Spain.
1811	Peninsular Wars	Battle of El Bodón	(Spain)	25 Sep	British successful rearguard action against France
1811	Peninsular Wars	Battle of Cervera	(Spain)	4-14 Oct	Spain defeats France
1811	Peninsular Wars	Battle of Saguntum	(Spain)	25 Oct	France defeats Spain
1811	Peninsular Wars	Battle of Arroyo dos Molinos	(Spain)	28 Oct	An allied force of the UK, Portugal and Spain under General Hill defeated a French force
1811	Peninsular Wars	Battle of Bornos	(Spain)	5 Nov	Spain defeats France
1811	American Indian Wars and Tecumseh's War	Battle of Tippecanoe	(United States)	7 Nov	American troops under Harrison defeat Tecumseh and Shawnee
1811	Napoleonic Wars	Action of 29 November 1811	(Croatia)	29 Nov	British Royal Navy defeats France
1811	Ottoman–Wahhabi War	Battle of Yanbu	(Saudi Arabia)	End of 1811	Muhammad Ali forces land in Yanbu, winning a battle against the Saudis and starting the Ottoman–Wahhabi War
1811	Janissary revolts	Janissary revolt in Tunisia	(Tunisia)		Tunisian victory , Beylik of Tunis dismantled the Turkish militia and gain Independence from Ottoman rule.
1812	Peninsular War	Siege of Tarifa	(Spain)	15 Dec 1811 – 5 Jan 1812	Anglo-Spanish troops defeat the French
1812	Peninsular War	Battle of Altafulla	(Spain)	29 Jan	France defeats Spain
1812	Ottoman–Wahhabi War	Battle of Al-Safra	(Saudi Arabia)	Jan	Ottoman Empire forces under Muhammad Ali meet Saudi Al-Kabeer forces near Medina. Saudi victory.
1812	Russo-Persian War	Battle of Sultanabad	(Azerbaijan)	13 Feb	Persia defeats Russia
1812	Napoleonic Wars	Battle of Pirano	(Slovenia)	22 Feb	British Royal Navy defeats France
1812	Peninsular War	Siege of Ciudad Rodrigo	(Spain)	2–23 Feb	British and Portuguese forces besiege and defeat French garrison
1812	Mexican War of Independence	Battle of Izúcar	(Spain)	23 Feb	Mexican rebels defeat Spain
1812	Peninsular War	Battle of Badajoz	(Spain)	16 March – 6 April	British and Portuguese forces besiege and defeat French garrison
1812	Peninsular War	Battle of Arlabán	(Spain)	9 April	Spain defeats France
1812	Peninsular War	Battle of Villagarcia	(Spain)	11 April	The UK defeats France
1812	Peninsular War	Battle of Almaraz	(Spain)	18–19 May	Anglo-Portuguese Army under Hill destroy a French pontoon bridge across the River Tagus
1812	Peninsular War	Battle of Bornos	(Spain)	31 May	France defeats Spain
1812	Peninsular War	Battle of Maguilla	(Spain)	11 June	France defeats the UK, Portugal and Spain
1812	Mexican War of Independence	Battle of Zitlala	(Mexico)	4 July	Mexican rebels defeat Spain
1812	Napoleonic Wars	Battle of Mir	(Belarus)	9–10 July	Russia defeats the French-controlled Duchy of Warsaw
1812	Gunboat War	Battle of Lyngør	(Norway)	12 July	British victory, Danish-Norwegian frigate sunk.
1812	Napoleonic Wars	Battle of Ekau	(Latvia)	19 July	France defeats Russia
1812	War of 1812	First Battle of Sacket's Harbor	(United States)	19 July	US turns back British naval attack
1812	Peninsular War	Battle of Castalla	(Spain)	21 July	France defeats Spain
1812	Peninsular War	Battle of Salamanca	(Spain)	22 July	A coalition force of the UK, Portugal and Spain under Wellington defeats French under Marmont. French evacuate Madrid, but soon return.
1812	Peninsular War	Battle of García Hernández	(Spain)	23 July	The UK defeats France
1812	Napoleonic Wars	Battle of Saltanovka	(Belarus)	23 July	France defeats Russia
1812	Napoleonic Wars	Battle of Ostrovno	(Belarus)	25 July	France defeats Russia
1812	Napoleonic Wars	Battle of Vitebsk	(Belarus)	26–27 July	France defeats Russia
1812	Napoleonic Wars	Battle of Kobrin	(Belarus)	27 July	Russia defeats the French vassal state of Saxony
1812	Napoleonic Wars	Battle of Klyastitsy	(Russia)	30 July – 1 Aug	Minor Russian victory over French corps
1812	Napoleonic Wars	Battle of Inkovo	(Russia)	8 August	Russia defeats France
1812	War of 1812 and Tecumseh's War	Battle of Maguaga	(United States)	9 Aug	Both armies, the USA and a coalition of the UK and Tecumseh's confederacy, withdraw
1812	Peninsular War	Battle of Majadahonda	(Spain)	11 Aug	France defeats the UK and Portugal
1812	Napoleonic Wars	Battle of Swolna	(Belarus)	11 Aug	Inconclusive battle between Russia and France
1812	Napoleonic Wars	Battle of Gorodechno	(Belarus)	12 Aug	French-controlled Austria and Saxony defeat Russia
1812	Napoleonic Wars	First Battle of Krasnoi	(Russia)	14 Aug	France defeats Russia
1812	War of 1812	Battle of Fort Dearborn	(United States)	15 Aug	American Fort burned by the Potowatomi
1812	War of 1812 and Tecumseh's War	Siege of Detroit	(United States)	15–16 Aug	American forces under General Hull surrender to British, under Sir Isaac Brock and Chief Tecumseh
1812	Napoleonic Wars	Battle of Smolensk	(Russia)	16–17 Aug	Russians under Bagration, de Tolley defeated and retreat by France
1812	Napoleonic Wars	First Battle of Polotsk	(Belarus)	17–18 Aug	Indecisive battle between Russian and French corps
1812	Peninsular War	Siege of Astorga	(Spain)	29 June - 19 Aug	Spain captures Astorga from France
1812	Napoleonic Wars	Battle of Valutino	(Russia)	19 Aug	Marginal French victory; successful Russian retreat
1812	Napoleonic Wars	Battle of Dahlenkirchen	(Latvia)	22 Aug	France defeats Russia
1812	War of 1812	Siege of Fort Harrison	(United States)	4–5 Sep	10 American soldiers repel attack by the Miami tribe, the Potowatomi, the Kickapoo people and the Ho-Chunk
1812	Napoleonic Wars	Battle of Shevardino	(Russia)	5 Sep	France defeats Russia
1812	Napoleonic Wars	Battle of Borodino	(Russia)	7 Sep	Russian commander Kutuzov retreats after bloody battle. Napoleon enters Moscow. General Bagration is killed.
1812	Napoleonic Wars	Battle of Zvenigorod	(Russia)	12 Sep	France defeats Russia
1812	War of 1812	Siege of Fort Wayne	(United States)	5–12 Sep	Americans repel Miamis and Potawatomis
1812	Peninsular War	Battle of Burgos	(Spain)	19 Sep – 21 Oct	Unsuccessful siege by Anglo-Portuguese Army. French victory.
1812	Argentine War of Independence	Battle of Tucumán	(Argentina)	24–25 Sep	Argentina's Army of the North, commanded by General Belgrano, defeat Spanish Royalist troops
1812	Napoleonic Wars	Battle of Mesoten	(Latvia)	29 Sep	French-controlled Prussia defeats Russia
1812	War of 1812	Battle of Queenston Heights	(Canada)	13 Oct	US forces under Van Rensselaer defeated in attempt to capture town by British under Sir Isaac Brock, who is killed
1812	Napoleonic Wars	Battle of Tarutino	(Russia)	18 Oct	Russian victory over French commander Murat's corps
1812	Napoleonic Wars	Second Battle of Polotsk	(Belarus)	18–20 Oct	Russian victory over Saint-Cyr's Franco-Bavarian force
1812	Napoleonic Wars	Battle of Maloyaroslavets	(Russia)	24 Oct	Russians under Dokhturov defeat French, forcing northern retreat
1812	War of 1812	USS United States vs HMS Macedonian	(Portugal)	25 Oct	Decatur's USS United States captures British HMS Macedonian
1812	Peninsular War	Battle of Tordesillas	(Spain)	25-29 Oct	France defeats the UK, Portugal and Spain
1812	Napoleonic Wars	Battle of Czasniki	(Belarus)	31 Oct	Russians defeat French Army, commanded by Victor
1812	Russo-Persian War	Battle of Aslanduz	(Iran)	31 Oct	Russians defeat Persian army of Abbas Mirza
1812	Napoleonic Wars	Battle of Vyazma	(Russia)	3 Nov	Russians defeat French indecisively
1812	Napoleonic Wars	Battle of Liaskowa	(Russia)	9 Nov	Russia defeats France
1812	Napoleonic Wars	Battle of Nowo Schwerschen	(Belarus)	13 Nov	Russia defeats Lithuania and the French-controlled Duchy of Warsaw
1812	Napoleonic Wars	Battle of Smoliani	(Belarus)	13–14 Nov	Russian victory over French forces of Victor and Oudinot
1812	Napoleonic Wars	Battle of Wolkowisk	(Belarus)	14-16 Nov	France defeats Russia
1812	Napoleonic Wars	Battle of Kaidanowo	(Belarus)	15 Nov	Russia defeats France
1812	Napoleonic Wars	Battle of Krasnoi	(Russia)	15–18 Nov	Partial Russian victory. Napoleon drives off Russian forces attempting to block retreat. Heroism of Marshal Ney.
1812	War of 1812	First Battle of Lacolle Mills	(Canada)	20 Nov	British and Mohawks defeat Americans
1812	Napoleonic Wars	Battle of Borisov	(Belarus)	21 Nov	Russia defeats France
1812	Napoleonic Wars	Battle of Loschniza	(Belarus)	23 Nov	France defeats Russia
1812	Napoleonic Wars	Battle of Berezina	(Belarus)	26–29 Nov	French successfully cross river with huge losses, despite being nearly surrounded by two Russian armies, ending retreat from Russia
1812	Ottoman–Wahhabi War	Battle of Medina	(Saudi Arabia)	Nov	The Ottoman Empire under Muhammad Ali recovers Medina from Saudis
1812	Ecuadorian War of Independence	Battle of Ibarra	(Ecuador)	27 Nov and 1 Dec	Spain defeats the State of Quito.
1812	Napoleonic Wars	Battle of Pleshchenitsy	(Belarus)	1 Dec	Russia defeats France
1812	Napoleonic Wars	Siege of Riga	(Latvia)	24 July - 18 Dec	France fails to capture Riga from Russia
1812	War of 1812	Battle of the Mississinewa	(United States)	17–18 Dec	US forces defeat Miami tribe
1812	Argentine War of Independence	Battle of Cerrito	(Uruguay)	31 Dec	The United Provinces of the Río de la Plata defeats Spain
1813	Ottoman–Wahhabi War	Battle of Jeddah	(Saudi Arabia)	7 Jan	The Ottoman Empire under Tusun Pasha and his father are able to hold on Jeddah. Jeddah is later captured by the Saudis.
1813	Ottoman–Wahhabi War	Battle of Mecca	(Saudi Arabia)		The Ottoman Empire under Tusun Pasha and his father reclaim Mecca from the Saudis
1813		Ibrahim Pasha campaign in upper Egypt	(Egypt)		Ibrahim Pasha crushed the Hawwara tribe forces in upper Egypt and made them flee in masses to the Sudan
1813	Argentine War of Independence	Battle of Salta	(Argentina)	20 Feb	The Argentina's Army of the North defeated for the second time the Spanish Royalist troops of General Tristán
1813	War of 1812	Battle of Ogdensburg	(United States)	22 Feb	British victory over the US after attacking against orders
1813	Argentine War of Independence	Battle of San Lorenzo	(Argentina)	3 Feb	Argentina defeats a Spanish Royalist force
1813	Mexican War of Independence	Battle of Rosillo Creek	(Mexico)	29 March	Mexican rebels defeat Spain
1813	War of the Sixth Coalition	Battle of Lüneburg	(Germany)	2 April	Russia and Prussia defeat France
1813	War of the Sixth Coalition	Battle of Möckern	(Germany)	5 April	Russia and Prussia defeat France
1813	Peninsular War	Battle of Castalla	(Spain)	13 April	The UK, Spain and Sicily defeat France
1813	War of 1812	Battle of Mobile	(United States)	15 April	US commander Wilkinson captures Mobile from Spain
1813	War of 1812	Battle of York	(Canada)	27 April	US commanders Dearborn and Chauncey capture British garrison, recklessly loot and burn capital
1813	Chilean War of Independence	Battle of Yerbas Buenas	(Chile)	27 April	Spain defeats patriots from Chile
1813	War of the Sixth Coalition	Battle of Lützen	(Germany)	2 May	Napoleon defeats Russo-Prussian army of Wittgenstein
1813	War of the Sixth Coalition	Battle of Gersdorf	(Germany)	8 May	Indecisive battle between France and a coalition of Prussia and Russia
1813	War of 1812	Siege of Fort Meigs	(United States)	1–9 May	Effective stalemate between the US and the UK
1813	Chilean War of Independence	Battle of San Carlos (1813)	(Chile)	15 May	Chilean patriots defeat Spain
1813	War of the Sixth Coalition	Battle of Bautzen	(Germany)	20–21 May	France under Napoleon defeats a coalition of Russia and Prussia under Wittgenstein, who is only able to escape due to Ney's incompetence
1813	War of the Sixth Coalition	Battle of Reichenbach	(Germany)	22 May	France defeats Russia
1813	War of the Sixth Coalition	Battle of Haynau	(Poland)	26 May	Prussia defeats France
1813	War of 1812	Battle of Fort George	(Canada)	27 May	US Lt. Col. Scott captures British fort
1813	War of the Sixth Coalition	Battle of Hoyerswerda	(Germany)	28 May	France defeats Prussia
1813	Mexican War of Independence	Battle of La Chincúa	(Mexico)	19 April – 28 May	Mexican rebels defeat Spain
1813	War of 1812	Second Battle of Sacket's Harbor	(United States)	28–29 May	US General Brown turns back British under Prevost
1813	War of 1812	Battle of Boston Harbor	(United States)	1 June	British HMS Shannon captures Lawrence's USS Chesapeake with ease
1813	Peninsular War	Siege of Tarragona	(Spain)	3–11 June	French victory in which an overwhelming Anglo-Allied force failed to capture the Spanish port
1813	War of the Sixth Coalition	Battle of Luckau	(Germany)	4 June	Prussia and Russia defeat France
1813	War of 1812	Battle of Stoney Creek	(Canada)	6 June	British force of 700 under Vincent defeat US force, under Chandler and Winder, three times its size
1813	Peninsular War	Battle of San Millan-Osma	(Spain)	18 June	The UK, Portugal and Spain defeat France
1813	Bolivian War of Independence and Argentine War of Independence	Battle of Pequereque	(Bolivia)	19 June	The United Provinces of the Río de la Plata and the Republiquetas defeat Spain
1813	Mexican War of Independence	Battle of Alazan Creek	(Mexico)	20 June	The US and Mexican rebels defeat Spain
1813	Peninsular War	Battle of Vitoria	(Spain)	21 June	The UK, Portugal and Spain under Wellington defeats French under Joseph, forced to withdraw towards France
1813	War of 1812	Battle of Craney Island	(United States)	22 June	British attack on Norfolk foiled
1813	Afghan-Sikh Wars	Battle of Attock	(Pakistan)	13 July	Sikhs decisively defeat Durranis.
1813	Peninsular War	Battle of Tolosa	(Spain)	26 June	The UK, Portugal and Spain defeat France
1813	Peninsular War	Battle of Maya	(Spain)	25 July	Draw between France and a coalition of the UK and Portugal
1813	Peninsular War	Battle of Roncesvalles	(Spain)	25 July	France defeats the UK and Portugal
1813	Creek War	Battle of Burnt Corn	(United States)	27 July	American forces disperse a raiding party of Creek Indians
1813	Peninsular War	Battle of the Pyrenees	(Spain)	25–30 July	French large-scale attack under General Soult against the UK, Portugal and Spain fails
1813	Peninsular War	Battle of Sorauren	(Spain)	28 July – 1 Aug	The UK, Portugal and Spain under Wellington defeats France under General Soult, who withdraws across the Pyrenees
1813	War of 1812	Battle of Fort Stephenson	(United States)	2 Aug	British attack on American fort fails
1813	War of 1812	Battle of St. Michaels	(United States)	10 Aug	The UK under Cockburn defeated by the US
1813	Mexican War of Independence	Battle of Medina	(United States)	18 Aug	Spain defeats Mexican rebels and Americans
1813	War of the Sixth Coalition	Battle of Goldberg	(Germany)	23 Aug	France defeats Russia and Prussia
1813	War of the Sixth Coalition	Battle of Großbeeren	(Germany)	23 Aug	Prussia, Russia and Sweden win series of three actions against France
1813	War of the Sixth Coalition	Battle of Katzbach	(Poland)	26 Aug	Prussia and Russia under Blücher defeats France under Marshal MacDonald
1813	War of the Sixth Coalition	Battle of Hagelberg	(Germany)	27 Aug	Prussia and Russia defeat France
1813	War of the Sixth Coalition	Battle of Dresden	(Germany)	26–27 Aug	Napoleon's last major victory on German soil, over main Allied army of Austria, Russia and Prussia of Prince Schwarzenberg
1813	War of the Sixth Coalition	Battle of Kulm	(Czech Republic)	29–30 Aug	France under Marshal Vandamme defeated, captured by allied coalition of Austria, Russia and Prussia
1813	Peninsular War	Battle of San Marcial	(Spain)	31 Aug	Spanish Army of Galicia, led by Freire, turns back France under Marshal Soult's last major offensive of the war
1813	War of the Sixth Coalition	Battle of Dennewitz	(Germany)	6 Sep	Prussia, Russia and Sweden under Crown Prince Charles John, Bülow defeat France under Ney
1813	War of the Sixth Coalition	Battle of Feistritz	(Austria)	6 Sep	France defeats Austria
1813	Napoleonic Wars and Coalition Wars	Battle of Lippa	(Croatia)	7 Sep	Austria defeats France
1813	Peninsular War	Battle of San Sebastian	(Spain)	7 July – 8 Sep	Allied forces of the UK and Portugal capture San Sebastián from French
1813	War of 1812	Battle of Lake Erie	(Canada)	10 Sep	US Perry's fleet defeats British
1813	Peninsular War	Battle of Ordal	(Spain)	13 Sep	The UK and Spain defeat France
1813	War of the Sixth Coalition	Second Battle of Kulm	(Czech Republic)	17 Sep	Allied Coalition of Austria, Prussia and Russia victory, Napoleon forced to halt his advance on Teplice and withdraws to Leipzig
1813	War of the Sixth Coalition	Battle of the Göhrde	(Germany)	18 Sep	Prussia, Russia and the UK defeat France
1813	War of the Sixth Coalition	Battle of Altenburg	(Germany)	28 Sep	Prussia, Austria and Russia defeat France
1813	War of the Sixth Coalition	Battle of Roßlau	(Germany)	29 Sep	Sweden defeats France
1813	Bolivian War of Independence and Argentine War of Independence	Battle of Vilcapugio	(Bolivia)	1 Oct	Republican forces of Argentina and Upper Peru were defeated by a Spanish Royalist army
1813	War of the Sixth Coalition	Battle of Wartenburg	(Germany)	3 Oct	Prussia defeats France
1813	War of 1812 and Tecumseh's War	Battle of the Thames	(Canada)	5 Oct	US troops under Harrison defeat British, Indians under Gen. Henry Procter; Tecumseh killed
1813	War of the Sixth Coalition	Battle of the Bidassoa	(France)	7 Oct	The UK, Portugal and Spain defeat France
1813	Chilean War of Independence	Battle of El Roble	(Chile)	13 Oct	Chilean patriots defeat Spain
1813	War of the Sixth Coalition	Battle of Leipzig	(Germany)	16–19 Oct	Napoleon suffers his greatest defeat ever in the largest battle of the Napoleonic Wars. Russia, Austria, Prussia, Sweden, Mecklenburg-Schwerin, Saxony and Württemberg defeat France
1813	War of 1812	Battle of the Chateauguay	(Canada)	25 Oct	The UK with several hundred Canadian militia and the Mohawk people turn back Hampton's advance on Montreal; the American army withdraws from Canada
1813	War of the Sixth Coalition	Battle of Hanau	(Germany)	30–31 Oct	Austro-Bavarian army under Prince Wrede unable to cut off French retreat
1813	Peninsular War	Siege of Pamplona	(Spain)	26 June - 31 Oct	Spain and the UK capture Pamplona from France
1813	Creek War	Battle of Tallushatchee	(United States)	3 Nov	US forces under Jackson defeat the Red Stick Creeks
1813	Creek War	Battle of Talladega	(United States)	9 Nov	US forces under Jackson defeat the Red Stick Creeks
1813	Peninsular War	Battle of Nivelle	(France)	10 Nov	Allied troops of the UK, Portugal and Spain defeat Marshal Soult of France
1813	War of 1812	Battle of Crysler's Farm	(Canada)	11 Nov	US forces under Wilkinson defeated by much smaller British force under Morrison
1813	Bolivian War of Independence, Argentine War of Independence, and Spanish American Wars of Independence	Battle of Ayohuma	(Bolivia)	14 Nov	Argentina's Army of the North and the Republiquetas are defeated by the Spanish Royalists
1813	War of the Sixth Coalition	Battle of Caldiero	(Italy)	15 Nov	France defeats Austria
1813	War of 1812 and Creek War	Battle of Autossee	(United States)	29 Nov	The US defeats the Red Stick Creeks
1813	War of the Sixth Coalition	Battle of Arnhem	(Netherlands)	30 Nov	Prussia defeats France
1813	Venezuelan War of Independence	Battle of Araure	(Venezuela)	5 Dec	Venezuelan patriots defeat Spain
1813	War of the Sixth Coalition	Battle of Bornhöved	(Germany)	7 Dec	Sweden defeats Denmark-Norway
1813	War of the Sixth Coalition	Battle of Sehested	(Germany)	10 Dec	Denmark-Norway defeats Russia, Prussia, the UK, Hanover and the Duchy of Mecklenburg-Schwerin
1813	War of the Sixth Coalition	Battle of the Nive	(France)	9–13 Dec	The UK, Portugal and Spain defeat Marshal Soult's French Army
1813	Mexican War of Independence	Battle of Lomas de Santa María	(Mexico)	23–24 Dec	Spain defeats Mexican rebels
1814	War of the Sixth Coalition	Siege of Danzig	(Poland)	16 Jan 1813 - 2 Jan 1814	Prussia and Russia capture Danzig, now Gdańsk, from France
1814	Napoleonic Wars	Siege of Cattaro	(Montenegro)	14 Oct 1813 - 3 Jan 1814	The UK, Montenegro and Sicily capture Kotor from France
1814	Mexican War of Independence	Battle of Puruarán	(Mexico)	5 Jan	Spain defeats Mexican rebels
1814	War of the Sixth Coalition	Siege of Torgau	(Germany)	18 Oct 1813 - 10 Jan 1814	Prussia captures Torgau from France
1814	War of the Sixth Coalition	Battle of Hoogstraten	(Belgium)	11 Jan	Prussia, the UK and Russia defeat France
1814	Creek War	Battles of Emuckfaw and Enotachopo Creek	(United States)	22–24 Jan	Twin indecisive battles. The Red Stick Creeks versus the US, the Lower Creeks and the Cherokee.
1814	War of the Sixth Coalition	First Battle of Bar-sur-Aube	(Germany)	24 Jan	France withdraws after a battle against Austria and Württemberg
1814	War of 1812 and Creek War	Battle of Calebee Creek	(United States)	27 Jan	Stalemate between the US and the Red Stick Creeks
1814	War of the Sixth Coalition	Battle of Brienne	(France)	29 Jan	France under Napoleon defeats Prussia and Russia under Blücher
1814	War of the Sixth Coalition	Battle of La Rothière	(France)	1 Feb	French under Napoleon manage to hold back an overwhelming force of Prussians until nightfall, where then they withdraw from the field
1814	War of the Sixth Coalition	Battle of Lesmont	(France)	2 Feb	France defeats Bavaria and Russia
1814	War of the Sixth Coalition	Battle of the Mincio River	(Italy)	8 Feb	Inconclusive battle between France and Austria
1814	War of the Sixth Coalition	Battle of Champaubert	(France)	10 Feb	France under Napoleon defeats Russia
1814	War of the Sixth Coalition	Battle of Montmirail	(France)	11 Feb	France under Napoleon defeats Russia and Prussia
1814	War of the Sixth Coalition	Battle of Château-Thierry	(France)	12 Feb	France under Napoleon defeats Russia and Prussia
1814	War of the Sixth Coalition	Battle of Vauchamps	(France)	14 Feb	France under Napoleon defeats Russia and Prussia
1814	Peninsular War	Battle of Garris	(France)	15 Feb	The UK, Portugal and Spain defeat France
1814	War of the Sixth Coalition	Battle of Mormant	(France)	17 Feb	France defeats Austria, Bavaria and Russia
1814	War of the Sixth Coalition	Battle of Montereau	(France)	18 Feb	France under Napoleon defeats Austria and Württemberg
1814	War of the Sixth Coalition	Battle of Bar-sur-Aube	(France)	27 Feb	Austria, Bavaria and Russia under Schwarzenberg defeats France under Marshal Macdonald
1814	Peninsular War	Battle of Orthez	(France)	27 Feb	The UK, Portugal and Spain under Wellington defeats French under Soult
1814	War of the Sixth Coalition	Battle of Gué-à-Tresmes	(France)	28 Feb	France defeats Prussia and Russia
1814	Spanish American wars of independence	Battle of Cúcuta	(Colombia)	28 Feb	The United Provinces of New Granada defeat Spain
1814	War of the Sixth Coalition	Battle of Saint-Julien	(France)	1 March	Austria defeats France
1814	War of the Sixth Coalition	Battle of Laubressel	(France)	3 March	Austria, Bavaria, Russia and Württemberg defeat France
1814	War of 1812	Battle of Longwoods	(United States)	4 March	American victory against the UK, the Wyandot people and the Potowatomi
1814	War of the Sixth Coalition	Battle of Berry-au-Bac	(France)	5 March	France under Napoleon defeats Russia
1814	War of the Sixth Coalition	Battle of Craonne	(France)	7 March	France under Napoleon defeats Prussia and Russia under Blücher
1814	War of the Sixth Coalition	Battle of Laon	(France)	9–10 March	Prussia and Russia under Blücher defeats France under Napoleon
1814	War of the Sixth Coalition	Battle of Mâcon	(France)	11 March	Austria defeats France
1814	War of the Sixth Coalition	Battle of Reims	(France)	13 March	France under Napoleon defeats isolated Russian and Prussian corps
1814	Chilean War of Independence	Battle of El Quilo	(Chile)	19 March	Chilean patriots defeat Spain
1814	War of the Sixth Coalition	Battle of Limonest	(France)	20 March	Austria and the Grand Duchy of Hesse defeat France
1814	Chilean War of Independence	Battle of Membrillar	(Chile)	20 March	Chilean patriots defeat Spain
1814	War of the Sixth Coalition	Battle of Arcis-sur-Aube	(France)	20–21 March	Austria, Bavaria, Russia and Württemberg under Schwarzenberg defeats France under Napoleon
1814	War of the Sixth Coalition	Battle of Fère-Champenoise	(France)	25 March	Austria, Prussia, Russia and Württemberg under Schwarzenberg defeats French corps of Marmont, Mortier
1814	War of the Sixth Coalition	Battle of Saint-Dizier	(France)	26 March	France defeats Russia
1814	War of 1812	Battle of Horseshoe Bend	(United States)	27 March	The US, Creeks, Cherokee and Choctaw under Jackson decisively defeats Red Stick Creeks
1814	War of the Sixth Coalition	Battle of Claye	(France)	28 March	Prussia forces France to retreat
1814	War of the Sixth Coalition	Battle of Montmartre	(France)	30 March	Allied forces of Russia, Austria and Prussia enter Paris, force surrender of France under Marmont, Mortier. Napoleon abdicates soon after; goes to Elba.
1814	War of 1812	Second Battle of Lacolle Mills	(Canada)	30 March	US forces under Wilkinson defeated by British in attempt to invade Canada via Niagara. Wilkinson relieved, replaced by Brown with assistance of Scott
1814	War of the Sixth Coalition	Battle of Courtrai	(Belgium)	31 March	France defeats Saxony and Prussia
1814	War of the Sixth Coalition	Battle of Toulouse	(France)	10 April	The UK, Portugal and Spain under Wellington defeat France under Soult, forced to abandon city. Fighting on southern front comes to end soon after, with news of Napoleon's abdication.
1814	War of the Sixth Coalition	Siege of Metz	(France)	3 Jan - 10 April	Prussia, Russia and the Electorate of Hesse fail to capture Metz from France
1814	Peninsular War	Battle of Bayonne	(France)	14 April	The UK, Portugal and Spain defeat France
1814	War of the Sixth Coalition	Siege of Antwerp	(Belgium)	14 Jan - 4 May	The UK and Prussia besiege Antwerp. French commander surrenders after news of Napoleon's abdication.
1814	War of the Sixth Coalition	Siege of Besançon	(France)	1 Jan - 2 May	Austria and Liechtenstein besiege Besançon. French commander surrenders after the news of Napoleon's abdication.
1814	War of the Sixth Coalition	Siege of Mainz	(Germany)	3 Jan - 4 May	Russia, the Duchy of Berg and the Duchy of Nassau besiege Mainz. French commander surrenders after news of Napoleon's abdication.
1814	War of the Sixth Coalition	Siege of Hamburg	(Germany)	24 Dec 1813 - 12 May 1814	Russian siege of Hamburg. The French commander surrendered on 27 May on orders of the new king of France.
1814	War of the Sixth Coalition	Siege of Naarden	(Netherlands)	17 Nov 1813 - 12 May 1814	The Netherlands and Russia besiege Naarden. French garrison surrenders after news that the war was over.
1814	War of the Sixth Coalition	Siege of Delfzijl	(Netherlands)	13 Nov 1813 - 23 May 1814	The Netherlands, Prussia, Russia and the UK besiege Delfzijl. The French commander surrenders after a treaty.
1814	Venezuelan War of Independence	Battle of Alto de los Godos	(Venezuela)	25 May	Venezuelan patriots defeat Spain
1814	War of 1812	Battle of Big Sandy Creek	(United States)	30 May	US forces surprise the British in upstate New York, capturing six ships and 143 prisoners
1814	Venezuelan War of Independence	Battle of Niquitao	(Venezuela)	2 July	Venezuelan patriots defeat Spain
1814	War of 1812	Battle of Chippawa	(Canada)	5 July	US forces invade Canada under Brown, Scott defeats British under Riall
1814	Venezuelan War of Independence	Battle of Los Horcones	(Venezuela)	22 July	Venezuelan patriots defeat Spain
1814	War of 1812	Battle of Lundy's Lane	(Canada)	25 July	Brown's Americans take on British under Drummond in violent indecisive battle. US forces withdraw from Canada due to heavy losses, giving argument for British victory.
1814	Venezuelan War of Independence	Battle of Taguanes	(Venezuela)	31 July	Venezuelan patriots and the United Provinces of New Granada defeat Spain
1814	Swedish–Norwegian War of 1814	Battle of Lier	(Norway)	2 Aug	Norway defeats Sweden
1814	War of 1812	Battle of Mackinac Island	(United States)	26 July – 4 Aug	Unsuccessful American attempt to capture the British Fort Mackinac.
1814	Swedish–Norwegian War of 1814	Battle of Matrand	(Norway)	5 Aug	Norway defeats Sweden
1814	Swedish–Norwegian War of 1814	Battle of Rakkestad	(Norway)	6 Aug	Sweden defeats Norway
1814	Swedish–Norwegian War of 1814	Battle of Langnes	(Norway)	9 Aug	Disputed outcome of a battle between Norway and Sweden
1814	Swedish–Norwegian War of 1814	Battle of Kjølberg Bridge	(Norway)	14 Aug	Sweden defeats Norway
1814	War of 1812	Battle of Bladensburg	(United States)	24 Aug	British forces rout Americans in Maryland. British move on to burn Washington in retribution for the burning of York. American government barely escapes the city as Congress and the White House are torched.
1814	War of 1812	Battle of Lake Champlain and Battle of Plattsburgh	(United States)	11 Sep	US squadron under Macdonough defeats British under Downie. On the same day, US land forces under Prevost fight indecisive battle with Americans under Macomb.
1814	War of 1812	Battle of North Point	(United States)	12 Sep	Land battle between the US and the UK, complement of Battle of Fort McHenry. Americans retreat after inflicting heavy casualties on the British.
1814	War of 1812	Battle of Fort McHenry	(United States)	13 Sep	American fort protecting Baltimore harbor holds out against British bombardment, inspiring Francis Scott Key's "Star Spangled Banner."
1814	War of 1812	Battle of Cook's Mills	(Canada)	19 Oct	Indecisive battle between the US and the UK
1814	War of 1812	Siege of Fort Erie	(Canada)	4 Aug – 5 Nov	Americans repel British attempt to retake fort
1814	War of 1812	Battle of Pensacola	(United States)	7–9 Nov	US commander Jackson wins Pyrrhic victory against the UK, Spain and the Creeks.
1814	Anglo-Nepalese War	Battle of Nalapani	(India)	31 October – 25-30 Nov	British victory
1814	Venezuelan War of Independence	Battle of Urica	(Venezuela)	5 Dec	Spain defeats Venezuela
1815	War of 1812	Battle of New Orleans	(United States)	8 Jan	The US under Jackson defeats British Army of Pakenham as news of Treaty of Ghent, signed in December, has not yet arrived.
1815	War of 1812	Battle of Fort Bowyer	(United States)	11 Feb	US commander Jackson loses fort against the UK after boasting that 10,000 men could not take it
1815	Neapolitan War	Battle of the Panaro	(Italy)	3 April	Naples defeats Austria
1815	Neapolitan War	Battle of Occhiobello	(Italy)	8–9 April	Austria and Prussia defeat Naples
1815	Neapolitan War	Battle of Carpi	(Italy)	10 April	Austria defeats Naples
1815	Neapolitan War	Battle of Casaglia	(Italy)	12 April	Austria defeats Naples
1815	Neapolitan War	Battle of Ronco	(Italy)	21 April	Austria defeats Naples
1815	Neapolitan War	Battle of Cesenatico	(Italy)	23 April	Austria defeats Naples
1815	Hundred Days	Siege of Ajaccio	(France)	3 March - 26 April	Bonapartist France captures Ajaccio from Bourbon France
1815	Neapolitan War	Battle of Pesaro	(Italy)	28 April	Austria defeats Naples
1815	Neapolitan War	Battle of Scapezzano	(Italy)	1 May	Austria defeats Naples
1815	Neapolitan War	Battle of Tolentino	(Italy)	2 May	Joachim Murat, King of Naples, declares for Napoleon; defeated by Austrians, forced to flee kingdom.
1815	Second Serbian uprising	Battle of Ljubić	(Serbia)	8 May	Serbia defeats the Ottoman Empire
1815	Neapolitan War	Battle of Castel di Sangro	(Italy)	13 May	Austria defeats Naples
1815	Neapolitan War	Battle of San Germano	(Italy)	15–17 May	Austria defeats Naples
1815	Hundred Days	Battle of Échaubrognes	(France)	18 May	Indecisive battle between Bonapartist France and Bourbon France
1815	Hundred Days	Battle of L'Aiguillon	(France)	19 May	Indecisive battle between Bonapartist France and Bourbon France
1815	Hundred Days	Battle of Aizenay	(France)	20–21 May	Indecisive battle between Bonapartist France and Bourbon France
1815	American Indian Wars and War of 1812	Battle of the Sink Hole	(United States)	24 May	The Sauk people defeat the US
1815	Hundred Days	Battle of Sainte-Anne-d'Auray	(France)	25 May	Bourbon France defeats Bonapartist France
1815	Hundred Days	Battle of Cossé	(France)	29 May	Indecisive battle between Bonapartist France and Bourbon France
1815	Hundred Days	Battle of Saint-Gilles-sur-Vie	(France)	2–3 June	Indecisive battle between Bonapartist France and Bourbon France
1815	Hundred Days	Battle of Redon	(France)	4 June	Indecisive battle between Bonapartist France and Bourbon France
1815	Hundred Days	Battle of Mathes	(France)	5 June	Indecisive battle between Bonapartist France and Bourbon France
1815	Hundred Days	Battle of Muzillac	(France)	10 June	Bourbon France defeats Bonapartist France
1815	War of the Seventh Coalition	Battle of Quatre Bras	(Belgium)	16 June	France under Ney fights indecisive battle against the UK, the Netherlands, Hanover, the Duchy of Nassau and the Duchy of Brunswick under Wellington
1815	War of the Seventh Coalition	Battle of Ligny	(Belgium)	16 June	Napoleon defeats Prussians under Blücher
1815	War of the Seventh Coalition	Battle of Waterloo	(Belgium)	18 June	Napoleon defeated by Wellington and Prussians, Dutch and German forces
1815	War of the Seventh Coalition	Battle of Wavre	(Belgium)	18 June	France under Marshal Grouchy, assigned to prevent Prussia under Blücher from joining Wellington, fights mildly successful battle against Blücher's rearguard
1815	Hundred Days	Battle of Rocheserviere	(France)	20 June	Bonapartist France defeats Bourbon France
1815	Hundred Days	Battle of Thouars	(France)	20 June	Bonapartist France defeats Bourbon France
1815	Hundred Days	Battle of Auray	(France)	21 June	Bonapartist France defeats Bourbon France
1815	Hundred Days	Battle of La Suffel	(France)	28 June	France defeats Austria and the Kingdom of Württemberg
1815	Hundred Days	Battle of Châteauneuf-du-Faou	(France)	1 July	Bonapartist France defeats Bourbon France
1815	War of the Seventh Coalition	Battle of Rocquencourt	(France)	1 July	France defeats Prussia
1815	War of the Seventh Coalition	Battle of Issy	(France)	2–3 July	Prussia defeats France
1815	Hundred Days	Battle of Guérande	(France)	7 July	Bonapartist France defeats Bourbon France
1815	Neapolitan War	Siege of Gaeta	(Italy)	28 May - 8 Aug	Austria and the UK capture Gaeta from Naples
1815	Hundred Days	Invasion of Guadeloupe	(France)	8-10 Aug	The UK and Bourbon France capture Guadeloupe from Bonapartist France
1815	Mexican War of Independence	Battle of Temalaca	(Mexico)	5 Nov	Spain defeats Mexican rebels

== 1816–1820 ==
Year	War	Battle	Loc.	Date(s)	Description
1816	Pemmican War	Battle of Seven Oaks	(Canada)	19 June	Civil war in British Canada. The North West Company and the Métis defeat the Hudson's Bay Company.
1816	-	Bombardment of Algiers	(Algeria)	27 Aug	UK and Dutch ships defeat Barbary pirates, forcing them to sign a treaty to release 3,000 Christian slaves.
1816	Portuguese conquest of the Banda Oriental	Battle of Carumbé	(Brazil)	27 Oct	Portugal defeats the Federal League.
1816	Argentine War of Independence	Battle of Yavi	(Argentina)	15 Nov	Spain defeats the United Provinces of South America.
1816	Portuguese conquest of the Banda Oriental	Battle of Pablo Perez	(Uruguay)	6 Dec	The Federal League defeats Portugal.
1817	Chilean War of Independence and Argentine War of Independence	Battle of Chacabuco	(Chile)	12 Feb	Chilean rebels defeat Spanish
1817	Chilean War of Independence and Argentine War of Independence	Battle of Curapalihue	(Chile)	4 April	
1817	Bolivian War of Independence and Argentine War of Independence	Battle of la Tablada de Tolomosa	(Bolivia)	15 April	
1817	Third Anglo-Maratha War	Battle of Khadki	(India)	5 Nov	British capture Pune
1817	Third Anglo-Maratha War	Battle of Mahidpur	(India)	21 Dec	British forces under Hislop defeat Marathas under Maharaja Holkar
1817	Ottoman–Wahhabi War	Nejd Expedition	(Saudi Arabia)	1817-1818	Ibrahim Pasha captured several Nejdi villages
1817		Battle of Makassar			Argentine skirmish
1818	Third Anglo-Maratha War	Battle of Koregaon	(India)	1 Jan	Unresolved
1818	Chilean War of Independence and Argentine War of Independence	Second Battle of Cancha Rayada	(Chile)	16 March	Spanish forces defeat Chileans under San Martín
1818	Chilean War of Independence	Battle of Maipú	(Chile)	5 April	Chile free from Spain
1818	Herati-Qajar Wars	Battle of Kafir Qala	(Afghanistan)	June	The Afghans defeat a Persian army on its way to take Herat
1818	Ottoman–Wahhabi War	Battle of Diriyah	(Saudi Arabia)	9 Sep	Ibrahim Pasha captures and destroys Diriyah, ending the First Saudi State
1818	Ottoman–Wahhabi War	Siege of Diriyah	(Saudi Arabia)	April-15 Sep	Ottoman forces capture Diriyah in one of the last battles of the Wahhabi War, torturing captured Saudi POWs
1818	Ottoman–Wahhabi War	Nejd Expedition	(Saudi Arabia)		Ibrahim Pasha captured Riyadh
1819	Venezuelan War of Independence	Battle of Las Queseras del Medio	(Venezuela)	2 April	
1819	Fifth Xhosa War	Battle of Grahamstown	(South Africa)	22 April	Xhosa chief Makana attacks the British settlement of Grahamstown with 6000 men and is repulsed with heavy losses
1819	Afghan-Sikh Wars	Battle of Shopian	(India)	3 July - Sikhs defeat Durrani Afghans and annex Srinagar and Kashmir.	
1819	Venezuelan War of Independence	Battle of Vargas Swamp	(Colombia)	25 July	
1819	Venezuelan War of Independence	Battle of Boyacá	(Colombia)	7 Aug	Simón Bolívar and his brigadier generals Santander and Anzoátegui defeat and capture Royalist Colonel Barreiro, sealing the independence of New Granada
1819	Mexican War of Independence	Battle of Agua Zarca	(Mexico)	5 Nov	
1819	Chilean War of Independence	Battle of Píleo	(Chile)	7 Dec	
1820	Chilean War of Independence	Battle of Valdivia	(Chile)	3–4 Feb	Cochrane and Beauchef capture the Royalist stronghold of Valdivia for Chile
1820	Chilean War of Independence	Battle of Agüi	(Chile)	18 Feb	
1820	Chilean War of Independence	Battle of El Toro	(Chile)	6 March	
1820	Chilean War of Independence	Battle of Tarpellanca	(Chile)	26 Sep	

== 1821-1825 ==
Year	War	Battle	Loc.	Date(s)	Description
1821	Neapolitan War	Battle of Rieti	(Italy)	7 March	Austrian forces defeat Neapolitan rebels against King Ferdinand
1821	Neapolitan War	Battle of Novara	(Italy)	8 April	Austrian and Sardinian troops defeat Piedmontese revolutionaries
1821	Greek War of Independence	Battle of Alamana	(Greece)	22 April	
1821	Greek War of Independence	Battle of Gravia Inn	(Greece)	8 May	
1821	Greek War of Independence	Battle of Doliana	(Greece)	18 May	
1821	Greek War of Independence	Battle of Valtetsi	(Greece)	24 May	
1821	Greek War of Independence	Battle of Dragashani	(Romania)	19 June	
1821	Venezuelan War of Independence	Battle of Carabobo	(Venezuela)	24 June	Simón Bolívar defeats Spanish Army, ensuring Venezuelan independence
1821	Greek War of Independence	Battle of Sculeni	(Moldova)	29 June	
1821	First Padri War	Battle of Menangkabaoe	(Indonesia)		Colonial Dutch forces defeat Indonesian rebels
1821	Mexican War of Independence	Battle of Azcapotzalco	(Mexico)	19 Aug	
1821	Argentine Civil Wars	Battle of Rincon de Marlopa	(Argentina)		Battle between Tucumán and the provinces of Salta and Santiago del Estero
1822	Ecuadorian War of Independence	Battle of Pichincha	(Ecuador)	24 May	Sucre defeats Spaniards near Quito
1822	Greek War of Independence	Burning of the Ottoman flagship off Chios	(Greece)	18 – 19 June	Greek rebel Konstantinos Kanaris burns the flagship of the Ottoman fleet
1822	Greek War of Independence	Battle at Dervenakia	(Greece)	26–28 July (O.S.)	Greek revolutionaries under Kolokotronis, Papaflessas and Nikitaras crush Dramali Pasha's Ottoman Army
1822	Greek War of Independence	Battle of Karpenizi	(Greece)	8 Aug (O.S.)	Greek troops under Botsaris defeat Ottoman force under Mustafa Pasha heading to reinforce Ottoman troops besieging Missolonghi
1823	Brazilian War of Independence	Battle of Jenipapo	(Brazil)	13 March	Portugal defeats Brazil
1823	Afghan–Sikh Wars	Battle of Nowshera	(Pakistan)	14 March	Sikhs take Peshawar valley
1823	-	Demerara rebellion	(Guyana)	18-20 Aug	10,000 Guyanese slaves rise up for two days
1823	Peruvian War of Independence	Battle of Zepita	(Peru)	25 Aug	Indecisive battle between Peru and Spain
1823	Spanish Expedition	Battle of Trocadero	(Spain)	31 Aug	French Army, under Duke of Angoulême, defeat Spanish Army and takes Trocadero. Occupation of Spain by French troops (1823 at 1828)
1824	First Anglo-Ashanti War	Battle of Nsamankow	(Ghana)	21 Jan	The Asante Empire defeats the UK and the Fante Confederacy.
1824	Chilean War of Independence	Battle of Mocopulli	(Chile)	1 April	Spain defeats Chile
1824	First Anglo-Burmese War	Battle of Ramu	(Bangladesh)	16 May	Burmese forces under Lord Myawaddy defeat British under Captain Noton, who is killed
1824	Peruvian War of Independence	Battle of Junín	(Peru)	6 Aug	Peru and Gran Colombia defeat Spain
1824	Peruvian War of Independence	Battle of Ayacucho	(Peru)	9 Dec	Peru and Gran Colombia defeat Spain
1825	First Anglo-Burmese War	Battle of Danubyu	(Myanmar)	2 April	British forces under Campbell defeat Burmese under Maha Bandula, who is killed
1825	Greek War of Independence	Battle of Sphacteria	(Greece)	8 May	Ibrahim Pasha of Egypt defeats the Greeks on behalf of the Ottomans.
1825	Java War	Siege of Yogyakarta	(Indonesia)	July - 25 Sep	The Dutch won after five years of fighting. Prince Diponegoro fails to capture Yogyakarta from the Yogyakarta Sultanate when a Dutch army under General Kock lifts the siege.
1825		Battle of Tripoli	(Libya)	26-27 Sep	A navy of the Kingdom of Sardinia defeats Tripolitania
1825	First Anglo-Burmese War	Battle of Prome	(Myanmar)	30 Nov – 2 Dec	Campbell defeats Burmese, led by Maha Ne Myo, who is killed

== 1826-1830 ==
Year	War	Battle	Loc.	Date(s)	Description
1826	Russo-Persian War	Battle of Ganja	(Iran)		Russia defeats Persian invaders
1826	Janissary revolts	Auspicious Incident	(Turkey)	15 June	Janissary corps disbanded , 20,000 janissaries were killed, executed, exiled, or imprisoned.
1826		Battle of Velata	(Tonga)	September	Tāufaʻāhau I decisively defeats Tu'i Tonga Laufilitonga whose position loses authority in all but name until Tāufaʻāhau I eventually abolishes the Tu'i Tonga monarchy later on.
1827	-	Battle of Berbera	(Somaliland)	10-11 Jan	
1827	Cisplatine War	Battle of Ituzaingó	(Brazil)	27 Feb	A Brazilian Army under Marquis of Barbacena met in combat an Argentine/Uruguayan Army led by General Alvear
1827	Cisplatine War	Battle of Monte Santiago	(Argentina)	April 7–8	A naval division of the Imperial Brazilian Navy is attacked by Argentine vessels. The battle ended with the destruction of the attacking forces.
1827	Greek War of Independence	Battle of Phaleron	(Greece)	24 April (O.S.)	Greek setback
1827	Greek War of Independence	Battle of Navarino	(Greece)	20 Oct	Joint British, French, Russian fleets, under Admirals Codrington, Rigny, and Heiden, destroy Turko-Egyptian fleet of Tahir Pasha inside Navarino Bay
1827	-	Battle of Kossober	(Ethiopia)	Oct	Ethiopian warlord Yimam of Yejju joins with Wube Haile Mariam of Semien to defeat Goshu Zewde of Gojjam and Meru of Dembiya.
1828	Spanish American wars of independence	Battle of Mariel	(Cuba)	10–11 Feb	The Spanish Navy defeats and captures a Mexican brig
1828	Russo-Turkish War	Battle of Akhaltsikhe	(Georgia (country))	9 Aug	Russian troops under Paskievich defeat Ottoman troops in Caucasus
1828	Liberal Wars	Battle of Praia Bay	(Portugal)	28 Aug	Miguelites fleet defeated by loyalists of Queen Maria
1829	Argentine Civil War	Battle of San Roque	(Argentina)	22 April	
1829	Argentine Civil War	Battle of Márquez Bridge	(Argentina)	26 April	
1829	Russo-Turkish War	Battle of Kulevicha	(Bulgaria)	11 June	Russian troops under Diebitsch defeat Ottoman Army under Reşid Pasha
1829	Spanish American wars of independence	Battle of Tampico	(Mexico)	11 Sep	Mexican army defeats a Spanish incursion near the city of Tampico
1830	French colonization of Africa	Battle of Staouéli	(Algeria)	18–19 June	France defeats Algiers

== 1831-1835 ==
Year	War	Battle	Loc.	Date(s)	Description
1831	Zemene Mesafint	Battle of Debre Abbay	(Ethiopia)	14 Feb	Ras Marye of Yejju marches into Tigray and defeats and kills Dejazmach Sabagadis
1831	November Uprising	Battle of Stoczek	(Poland)	14 Feb	Polish victory over Russia
1831	November Uprising	Battle of Nowa Wieś	(Poland)	19 Feb	Polish victory after being outnumbered by Russians
1831	November Uprising	First Battle of Wawer	(Poland)	19-20 Feb	Polish victory over Russia
1831	November Uprising	Battle of Białołęka	(Poland)	24 Feb	Polish counterattack succeeds, forcing Russian attack to be moved up one day
1831	November Uprising	Battle of Olszynka Grochowska	(Poland)	25 Feb	Marginal Polish victory over Russia
1831	November Uprising	Battle of Iganie	(Poland)	8 March	Poland defeats Russia
1831	November Uprising	Second Battle of Wawer	(Poland)	31 March	Second Polish victory over Russia in that town
1831	November Uprising	Battle of Dębe Wielkie	(Poland)	31 March	Polish victory over Russia
1831	November Uprising	Battle of Poryck	(Ukraine)	11 April	Polish victory over Russia
1831		Battle of Balakot	(Pakistan)	6 May	Sikhs repel Islamic invasion leb by Syed Ahmad Barelvi.
1831		Battle of Ostrołęka	(Poland)	26 May	Russians under Diebitsch fight indecisive battle against Poles of Skrzynecki
1831		Battle of Rajgród	(Poland)	29 May	Second-to-last Polish victory over Russia
1831	Liberal Wars	Battle of the Tagus	(Portugal)	11 July	French victory. French attempt to strongarm the Portuguese government into recognizing the Kingdom of France.
1831	Belgian Revolution	Ten days campaign	(Belgium) / (Netherlands)	2–12 Aug	Dutch military victory under Prince William
1831	Liberal Wars	Battle of Ladeira da Velha	(Portugal)	3 Aug	Portuguese Liberals defeat Portuguese Miguelites
1831	Belgian Revolution	Battle of Hasselt	(Belgium)	8 Aug	Dutch army defeat Belgian rebels. The rebels suffer 700 dead while Dutch losses are very small.
1831	Belgian Revolution	Battle of Leuven	(Belgium)	12 Aug	The Dutch army defeat the Belgian rebels and take the city
1831	Slave rebellions in the US	Nat Turner's Rebellion	(United States)	21-23 Aug	Rebellion suppressed
1831	November Uprising	Battle of Warsaw	(Poland)	6–8 Sep	Russians under Paskievich defeat Poles under Dembiński and stamp out revolt
1832	Black Hawk War	Indian Creek Massacre	(United States)	20 May	US settlers killed by Potawatomi and Sauk warriors
1832	Black Hawk War	Battle of the Kellogg's Grove	(United States)	16 July	US forces defeat Sauk
1832	Liberal Wars	Battle of Ponte Ferreira	(Portugal)	22–23 July	Indecisive battle between Portuguese Liberals and Portuguese Miguelites
1832	Black Hawk War	Battle of Bad Axe	(United States)	2 Aug	US Illinois militia massacres Black Hawk's Sauk and Fox
1832	Belgian Revolution	Siege of Antwerp	(Belgium)	15 Nov	Dutch troops occupying Antwerp's citadel (led by Chassé) against France's Armée du Nord. France captures the citadel.
1832	First Turko-Egyptian War	Battle of Konya	(Turkey)	21 Dec	Egyptian forces under Ibrahim Pasha defeat main Ottoman Army of Reşid Pasha
1832	-	Verovering van Bondjol	(Indonesia)		Dutch army successfully beats down an uprise by the people of Sumatra
1833	Liberal Wars	Battle of Cape St. Vincent	(Portugal)	5 July	British fleet under Napier defeats fleet of Portuguese usurper Don Miguel
1833	Liberal Wars	Battle of Cova da Piedade	(Portugal)	23 July	Portuguese Liberals defeat Portuguese Miguelites
1833	-	Siege of Maastricht	(Netherlands)	1 Oct 1830 - 18 Nov 1833	Belgium fails to capture Maastricht from The Netherlands
1834	First Carlist War	Battle of Alsasua	(Spain)	22 April	Spanish Carlists defeat Spanish Liberals.
1834	Afghan-Sikh Wars	Battle of Peshawar	(Pakistan)	6 May	Sikhs take Peshawar from Sultan Mohammad Khan.
1834	Liberal Wars	Battle of Santarén	(Portugal)	16 May	Portuguese forces loyal to Queen Maria II (led by her father, Don Pedro) defeat forces of usurper Don Miguel
1834	First Carlist War	Battle of Aranzueque	(Spain)	19 Sep	Spanish Liberals defeat Spanish Carlists.
1834	First Carlist War	Battle of Venta de Echavarri	(Spain)	28 Oct	Spanish Carlists defeat Spanish Liberals.
1834	First Carlist War	First Battle of Arquijas	(Spain)	15 Dec	Spanish Carlists defeat Spanish Liberals.
1835	Slave revolts in Brazil	Malê revolt	(Brazil)	24 January	A Muslim slaves rebellion broke out in Bahia, Brazil during Ramadan and was suppressed by the Imperial Brazilian Army
1835	French colonization of Africa	Battle of Macta	(Algeria)	28 June	The Emirate of Abdelkader defeats France.
1835	First Carlist War	Battle of Mendigorría	(Spain)	16 July	Spanish Liberals defeat Spanish Carlists.
1835	Texas Revolution	Battle of Gonzales	(United States)	2 Oct	Mexicans withdraw from Texians
1835	Texas Revolution	Battle of Goliad	(United States)	10 Oct	Texas defeats Mexico.
1835	Texas Revolution	Battle of Concepción	(United States)	28 Oct	Texans defeat Mexicans under Martin Perfecto de Cós
1835	Texas Revolution	Grass Fight	(United States)	26 Nov	Texans, thinking a Mexican pack train is carrying silver, capture it but only end up with grass
1835	Texas Revolution	Siege of Bexar	(United States)	12 Oct – 11 Dec	Texans successfully besiege and defeat Mexicans
1835	Moriori genocide	Invasion of Chatham Islands	(New Zealand)	19 Noc	Maori defeat and insalve moriori
1835	Second Seminole War	Dade Battle	(United States)	25 Dec	108 American troops were ambushed by about 180 Seminoles. Colonel Dade, who was on horseback, was the first to be killed. Only three American purportedly survived the attack. Two of these survivors died shortly after.

== 1836-1840 ==
Year	War	Battle	Loc.	Date(s)	Description
1836	Texas Revolution	Battle of San Patricio	(United States)	27 Feb	Texan expedition into Mexico thwarted
1836	Texas Revolution	Battle of Agua Dulce Creek	(United States)	2 March	Mexico defeats Texas.
1836	Texas Revolution	Battle of the Alamo	(United States)	23 Feb – 6 March	Mexican general Santa Anna defeats Texans. Travis and Crockett killed in siege.
1836	Texas Revolution	Battle of Refugio	(United States)	12–15 March	Infighting amongst Texans leads to defeat against Mexico.
1836	Texas Revolution	Battle of Coleto	(United States)	19–20 March	Col. Fannin and Texans defeated and captured by Mexicans of General Urrea. Later massacred by Santa Anna.
1836	Texas Revolution	Battle of San Jacinto	(United States)	21 April	Texans capture Mexican general Santa Anna
1836	First Carlist War	Battle of Terapegui	(Spain)	26 April	Spanish constitutionalist forces loyal to Queen Isabella, supported by French Foreign Legion, defeat Carlists
1836		Expedition to Najd (1836)	(Saudi Arabia)	July	Egyptian-Ottoman victory, Mohammed Ali Pasha occupies Najd and gains the submission of Bahrain, Qatar, and Trucial Oman; Faisal Al Saud taken to a prison in Cairo
1836	Second Seminole War	Battle of San Felasco Hammock	(United States)	18 Sep	The USA defeats the Seminole.
1836	First Carlist War	Battle of Villarrobledo	(Spain)	20 Sep	Spanish Liberals defeat Spanish Carlists.
1836	First Carlist War	Battle of Majaceite	(Spain)	23 Nov	Spanish Liberals defeat Spanish Carlists.
1836	Afghan–Sikh Wars	Battle of Panjtar	(Pakistan)	Nov	Pashtuns defeat Sikhs.
1836	Second Seminole War	Battle of Wahoo Swamp	(United States)	21 Nov – Dec	The USA defeats the Seminole.
1837	First Carlist War	Battle of Huesca	(Spain)	24 March	Constitutionalists win decisive victory over Carlists
1837	Afghan-Sikh wars	Battle of Jamrud	(Pakistan)	30 April	Disputed results. Battle between Emirate of Afghanistan and the Sikh Empire
1837	Padri War	Siege of Fort Bonjol	(Indonesia)	Mid-Aug 1835 - 16 Aug 1837	The Netherlands capture Fort Bonjol from the Padri.
1837	First Carlist War	Battle of Villar de los Navarros	(Spain)	24 Aug	Spanish Carlists defeat Spanish constitutionalists
1837	French colonization of Africa	Siege of Constantine	(Algeria)	10-13 Oct	French victory subduing the city of Constantine
1837	Lower Canada Rebellion	Battle of Saint-Denis	(Canada)	23 Nov	Canadian rebels under Wolfred Nelson defeat British
1837	Rebellions of 1837	Battle of Saint-Charles	(Canada)	25 Nov	British defeat Canadian rebels
1837	Upper Canada Rebellion and Rebellions of 1837	Confrontation at Montgomery's Tavern	(Canada)	7 Dec	British defeat Canadian rebels
1837	Lower Canada Rebellion	Battle of Saint-Eustache	(Canada)	14 Dec	British capture and ransack village in Lower Canada
1837	Second Seminole War	Battle of Lake Okeechobee	(United States)	25 Dec	US forces under Zachary Taylor defeat Seminoles
1838	Upper Canada Rebellion	Battle of Pelee Island	(Canada)	3 March	The UK defeats the Canadian Patriote movement.
1838	Second Seminole War	Battle of Pine Island Ridge	(United States)	22 March	The Seminole defeat the USA.
1838	Great Trek	Battle of Italeni	(South Africa)	9 April	The Zulu Kingdom defeats the Voortrekkers.
1838	Great Game	Siege of Herat	(Afghanistan)	13 Nov 1837 - 9 Sep 1838	Herat and British victory against Qajar dynasty of Persia
1838	First Carlist War	Battle of Maella	(Spain)	1 Oct	Spanish Carlists defeat Spanish Liberals.
1838	Lower Canada Rebellion	Battle of Baker's Farm	(Canada)	8 November	Only and last victory of Patriots in 1838 against the UK.
1838	Lower Canada Rebellion	Battle of Beauharnois	(Canada)	10 Nov	Revolt in Canada put down by the UK.
1838	Upper Canada Rebellion	Battle of the Windmill	(Canada)	12–16 Nov	British forces defeat Canadian rebels
1838	Upper Canada Rebellion	Battle of Windsor	(United States) / (Canada)	4 Dec	The UK and the USA defeat the Hunters' Lodges.
1838	Great Trek	Battle of Blood River	(South Africa)	16 Dec	Voortrekker force under Pretorius defeat Zulu force under King Dingane
1839	War of the Confederation	Battle of Buin	(Peru)	6 Jan	The Peru–Bolivian Confederation defeats Chile.
1839	War of the Confederation	Battle of Casma	(Peru)	12 Jan	Chile defeats the Peru-Bolivian Confederation.
1839	War of the Confederation	Battle of Yungay	(Peru)	20 Jan	Chile and Agustín Gamarra defeat the Peru-Bolivian Confederation.
1839	First Carlist War	Battle of Ramales	(Spain)	12 May	Spanish Liberals defeat Spanish Carlists.
1839	Texas–Indian wars	Battle of the San Gabriels	(United States)	17 May	Texas defeats Mexico
1839	Egyptian–Ottoman War	Battle of Nezib	(Turkey)	24 June	Egyptian forces under Ibrahim Pasha defeat Ottoman Army under Hafiz Pasha (assisted by Prussian Captain Moltke)
1839	Texas-Indian Wars	Battle of the Neches	(United States)	15–16 July	Texas and the Tonkawa defeat the Cherokee and the Lenape.
1839	First Anglo-Afghan War	Battle of Ghazni	(Afghanistan)	23 July	Brits and the Durrani dynasty capture Ghazni from the Emirate of Kabul.
1839	First Opium War	Battle of Kowloon	(China)	3 Sep	Stalemate between the UK and China.
1839	First Opium War	First Battle of Chuenpi	(China)	3 Nov	The UK defeats China.
1840	-	Battle of Magango	(South Africa)	29 Jan	Boer forces defeat Zulu King Dingane
1840	Texas–Indian wars	Battle of Plum Creek	(United States)	12 Aug	
1840	First Opium War	Battle of the Barrier	(China)	19 Aug	
1840	Mexican Federalist War	Battle of Saltillo	(Mexico)	25 Oct	
1840	War of the Confederation and Uruguayan Civil War	French blockade of the Rio de la Plata	(Uruguay)	28 March 1838 - 29 Oct 1840	Two year long blockade on the new Argentine Republic
1840	Argentine Civil War	Battle of Quebracho Herrado	(Argentina)	28 Nov	
1840	French colonization of Africa	Battle of Mazagran	(Algeria)	1840 - 1903	French Army holds up against an attack by Algerian forces

== 1841-1845 ==
Year	War	Battle	Loc.	Date(s)	Description
1841	First Opium War	Second Battle of Chuenpi	(China)	7 Jan	
1841	First Opium War	Battle of First Bar	(China)	27 Feb	
1841	First Opium War	Battle of Whampoa	(China)	2 March	
1841	United States Exploring Expedition	Battle of Drummond's Island	(Kiribati)	9 April	
1841	First Opium War	Battle of Canton	(China)	24 May	British amphibious assault captures city
1841	Argentine Civil Wars	Battle of Angaco	(Argentina)	16 Aug	
1841	First Opium War	Battle of Amoy	(China)	26 Aug	
1841	Argentine Civil War	Battle of Famaillá	(Argentina)	19 Sep	
1841	Argentine Civil War	Battle of Rodeo del Medio	(Argentina)	24 Sep	
1841	First Opium War	Battle of Chinhai	(China)	10 Oct	
1841	First Anglo-Afghan War	Battle of Jellalabad	(Afghanistan)	12 Nov 1841 – 13 April 1842	Brits capture Jalalabad
1842	First Anglo-Afghan War	Battle of Kabul	(Afghanistan)	6 Jan	Afghan forces force British to withdraw from city, which they had occupied for two and a half years
1842	Zemene Mesafint	Battle of Debre Tabor	(Ethiopia)	7 Feb	Ras Ali Alula, Regent of the Emperor of Ethiopia, defeats warlord Wube Haile Maryam of Semien
1842	First Opium War	Battle of Ningpo	(China)	10 March	
1842	First Opium War	Battle of Woosung	(China)	16 June	
1842	First Opium War	Battle of Chinkiang	(China)	21 July	
1842	Dogra-Tibetan war	Battle of Chushul	(India)	6 September	Dogra dynasty defeats Tibet.
1842	Slave rebellions in the US	Cherokee Nation Slave Revolt	(United States)	15-28 Nov	Slaves owned by the Cherokee revolted and killed two slave catchers before being caught by a large force and returned to slavery or executed.
1842	Uruguayan Civil War	Battle of Arroyo Grande	(Argentina)	6 Dec	Blancoist victory
1842	Argentine Civil War	Battle of Costa Brava	(Argentina)		Battle between Argentina and the Uruguayan colorados
1843	French colonization of Africa	Battle of the Smala	(Algeria)	16 May	French forces under Duke of Aumale defeat Algerians under Abd el-Kader
1843	British conquest of Sindh	Battle of Miani	(Pakistan)	17 Feb	British forces under Napier defeat the Baloch forces of the Talpurs in Sind
1843	British conquest of Sindh	Battle of Hyderabad	(Pakistan)	March	Napier defeats Balochs in Sind
1844	Dominican War of Independence	Battle of Fuente del Rodeo	(Dominican Republic)	13 March	
1844	Dominican War of Independence	Battle of Cabeza de Las Marías	(Dominican Republic)	13–18 March	
1844	Dominican War of Independence	Battle of Azua	(Dominican Republic)	19 March	
1844	Dominican War of Independence	Battle of Santiago	(Dominican Republic)	30 March	
1844	Dominican War of Independence	Battle of El Memiso	(Dominican Republic)	13 April	
1844	Dominican War of Independence	Battle of Tortuguero	(Dominican Republic)	15 April	
1844	Franco-Moroccan War	Bombardment of Tangiers	(Morocco)	6 Aug	The first bombardment in a slew of attacks by the French Navy during the war
1844	Franco-Moroccan War	Battle of Isly	(Morocco)	14 Aug	French forces under Marshal Bugeaud rout Moroccan forces
1844	Franco-Moroccan War	Bombardment of Mogador	(Morocco)	15-17 Aug	The third bombardment of the war
1844	Dominican War of Independence	Battle of Fort Cachimán	(Haiti)	6 Dec	
1845	Flagstaff War	Battle of Ohaeawai	(New Zealand)	July	British Army attacks Māori Ngāpuhi, but fortifications too strong
1845	Dominican War of Independence	Battle of Estrella	(Dominican Republic)	17 Sep	
1845	French colonization of Africa	Battle of Sidi Brahim	(Algeria)	22–25 Sep	
1845	Uruguayan Civil War	Battle of Vuelta de Obligado	(Argentina)	20 Nov	Battle during the Anglo-French blockade of the Río de la Plata
1845	Dominican War of Independence	Battle of Beler	(Dominican Republic)	27 Nov	
1845	First Anglo-Sikh War	Battle of Mudki	(India)	18 Dec	Sikh forces invading British India defeated by force under Gough
1845	First Anglo-Sikh War	Battle of Ferozeshah	(India)	21–22 Dec	British forces under Gough and Hardinge defeat Sikhs under Lal Singh in hard-fought battle

== 1846-1850 ==
Year	War	Battle	Loc.	Date(s)	Description
1846	First Anglo-Sikh War	Battle of Aliwal	(India)	28 Jan	Sikh forces under Ranjodh Singh defeated by British under Smith
1846	First Anglo-Sikh War	Battle of Sobraon	(India)	10 Feb	British forces under Gough decisively defeat Sikhs and Punjab becomes British protectorate
1846	Mexican–American War	Siege of Fort Texas	(United States)	3–9 May	Mexican siege on US fort unsuccessful
1846	Mexican–American War	Battle of Palo Alto	(United States)	8 May	US General Taylor defeats Mexicans under Arista
1846	Mexican–American War	Battle of Resaca de la Palma	(United States)	9 May	Taylor attacks Arista's retreating Mexicans
1846	Mexican–American War	Siege of Los Angeles	(United States)	13 Aug	US Marines briefly capture Los Angeles, but are driven out by Californio forces led by Flores
1846	Mexican–American War	Battle of Santa Fe	(United States)	15 Aug	Kearney occupies Santa Fe
1846	Mexican–American War	Battle of Monterrey	(Mexico)	20–24 Sep	Mexicans under Ampudia defeated by Taylor's US forces in hard-fought battle
1846	Mexican–American War	Battle of Dominguez Rancho	(United States)	9 Oct	José Antonio Carrillo leads Californio forces in victory against 350 US Marines and sailors near Los Angeles
1846	Mexican–American War	First Battle of Tabasco	(Mexico)	24–26 Oct	Commodore Perry fights inconclusive battle with Mexicans under Traconis
1846	Mexican–American War	Battle of San Pasqual	(United States)	6 Dec	US General Kearney's dragoons are defeated by Californio forces, led by Pico near San Diego
1846	Kraków Uprising	Battle of Gdów	(Poland)		Austrians defeat Polish insurgents
1847	Mexican–American War	Battle of Rio San Gabriel	(United States)	8 Jan	Kearney's 600-man army defeats the 160-man Californio force near Los Angeles
1847	Mexican–American War	Battle of La Mesa	(United States)	9 Jan	Kearney, Stockton and Frémont's combined US forces, defeat the Californio's in the climactic battle for California
1847	Mexican–American War	Battle of the Sacramento	(Mexico)	28 Feb	US forces under Doniphan defeat Mexican force near Chihuahua
1847	Mexican–American War	Battle of Buena Vista	(Mexico)	22–23 Feb	Taylor's outnumbered men trounce Santa Anna's Mexicans
1847	Mexican–American War	Battle of Vera Cruz	(Mexico)	9–29 March	Scott takes port city
1847	-	Bombardment of Tourane	(Vietnam)	15 April	French forces attack Da Nang after the Vietnamese hold two French priests captive.
1847	Mexican–American War	Battle of Cerro Gordo	(Mexico)	18 April	Scott defeats Santa Anna
1847	Mexican–American War	Battle of Tuxpan	(Mexico)	18 April	Perry defeats Cos
1847	Mexican–American War	Second Battle of Tabasco	(Mexico)	15–16 June	Commodore Perry captures port cities Tuxpan and Carmen
1847	Mexican–American War	Battle of Contreras	(Mexico)	19–20 Aug	Scott's forces storm Mexican position defending Mexico City
1847	Mexican–American War	Battle of Churubusco	(Mexico)	20 Aug	Another US force storms other main Mexican position defending capital
1847	Albanian revolt of 1847	Battle of Dholani	(Greece)	28 Aug	Albanian rebels under Zenel Gjoleka defeat the Ottoman Empire.
1847	Mexican–American War	Battle of Molino del Rey	(Mexico)	8 Sep	Scott defeats Mexican force defending fortification in hard-fought battle
1847	Mexican–American War	Battle of Chapultepec	(Mexico)	12 Sep	Scott takes fortified hill by storm
1847	Mexican–American War	Siege of Puebla	(Mexico)	14 Sep – 12 Oct	Puebla taken by Scott
1847	Mexican–American War	Battle of Huamantla	(Mexico)	9 Oct	US victory, end of Santa Anna's military career
1847	Sonderbund War	Skirmish of Gisikon	(Switzerland)	23 Nov	Swiss Liberals defeat the conservative Sonderbund
1848	-	Battle of Dabarki	(Sudan)	March	Dejazmach Kassa assaults an Egyptian fortified camp deep inside Sudan and suffers massive losses. One of the few defeats experienced by the future Emperor.
1848	First Schleswig War	Battle of Bov	(Denmark)	9 April	Denmark defeats the Duchy of Schleswig
1848	First Schleswig War	Battle of Schleswig	(Germany)	23 April	Prussia defeats Denmark
1848	Greater Poland uprising	Battle of Miłosław	(Poland)	30 April	Polish victory over Prussia after failed peace talks
1848	First Schleswig War	Battle of Nybøl	(Denmark)	28 May	Denmark defeats Hanover
1848	First Schleswig War	Battle of Dybbøl	(Denmark)	5 June	Denmark defeats Prussia
1848	Hungarian Revolution of 1848	Battle of Karlóca	(Serbia)	12 June	Serbians defeat Hungary
1848	First Italian War of Independence	Battle of Custoza	(Italy)	24–25 July	Austrian forces under Marshal Radetzky defeat Sardinians under King Charles Albert
1848	Great Trek	Battle of Boomplaats	(South Africa)	29 Aug	British forces under Smith defeat Boers under Pretorius in Orange River area
1848	Wallachian Revolution of 1848	Battle of Dealul Spirii	(Romania)	25 Sep	The Ottoman Empire defeats Wallachia.
1848	Hungarian Revolution of 1848	Battle of Pákozd	(Hungary)	29 Sep	Hungarian forces defeat Austrian army of Count Jellachich
1848	First Italian War of Independence	Battle of Mestre	(Italy)	27 Oct	The Republic of San Marco defeats Austria
1848	Hungarian Revolution of 1848	Battle of Schwechat	(Austria)	30 Oct	Austria and Croatians defeat Hungary
1848	Second Anglo-Sikh War	Battle of Ramnagar	(Pakistan)	22 Nov	British forces under Gough repulsed by Sikhs under Shere Singh in Punjab
1848	Hungarian Revolution of 1848	Battle of Mór	(Hungary)	30 Dec	Austria under Josip Jelačić defeats a Hungarian detachment under Perczel
1849	Second Anglo-Sikh War	Battle of Chillianwala	(Pakistan)	13 Jan	British forces under Gough fight another indecisive battle with Sikhs, resulting in Gough's dismissal
1849	Second Anglo-Sikh War	Siege of Multan	(Pakistan)	22 Jan	British forces capture fortress in Punjab
1849	Second Anglo-Sikh War	Battle of Gujarat	(Pakistan)	21 Feb	Gough, before getting word of dismissal, crushes Sikhs, Punjab annexed
1849	Hungarian Revolution of 1848	Battle of Kápolna	(Hungary)	26–27 Feb	Hungarian forces under Dembiński defeated by Austrians under Alfred I
1849	First Italian War of Independence	Battle of Novara	(Italy)	23 March	Radetzky defeats Charles Albert, forcing Piedmontese to make peace
1849	Hungarian Revolution of 1848	Second Battle of Szolnok	(Hungary)	5 March	Hungarian forces led by General Damjanich defeat Austrian forces
1849	First Italian War of Independence	Ten Days of Brescia	(Italy)	23 March – 1 April	Popular riot against the Austrian garrisons
1849	Hungarian Revolution of 1848	Battle of Hatvan	(Hungary)	2 April	Hungary and the Polish Legion defeat Austria.
1849	Hungarian Revolution of 1848	Battle of Tápióbicske	(Hungary)	4 April	Hungary and the Polish Legion defeat Austria and Croatians.
1849	First Schleswig War	Battle of Eckernförde	(Germany)	5 April	The Navy of Schleswig-Holstein defeats Denmark.
1849	Hungarian Revolution of 1848	Battle of Isaszeg	(Hungary)	6 April	Hungarian forces led by General Görgei defeat Austrians (Alfred I, Schlik)
1849	Dominican War of Independence	Battle of El Número	(Dominican Republic)	17 April	The Dominican Republic defeats Haiti.
1849	Hungarian Revolution of 1848	Battle of Nagysalló	(Slovakia)	19 April	Hungary and the Polish Legion defeat Austria.
1849	Dominican War of Independence	Battle of Las Carreras	(Dominican Republic)	21–22 April	The Dominican Republic defeats Haiti.
1849	First Schleswig War	Battle of Kolding	(Denmark)	23 April	Prussia defeats Denmark.
1849	Hungarian Revolution of 1848	First Battle of Komárom	(Hungary)	26 April	Hungary defeats Austria.
1849	First Italian War of Independence	Battle of Velletri	(Italy)	19 May	Strategic victory for the Kingdom of the Two Sicilies over the Roman Republic.
1849	Hungarian Revolution of 1848	Battle of Buda	(Hungary)	21 May	Hungarians take back the capital from Austrians
1849	First Schleswig War	Battle of Heligoland	(Germany)	4 June	Inconclusive naval battle between Denmark and Germany.
1849	Hungarian Revolution of 1848	Battle of Csorna	(Hungary)	13 June	Hungary defeats Austria.
1849	Palatine Uprising	Battle of Kirchheimbolanden	(Germany)	14 June	Prussia defeats Palatine rebels.
1849	Palatine Uprising	Battle of Rinnthal	(Germany)	17 June	Prussia defeats Palatine rebels.
1849	Palatine Uprising	Battle of Ludwigshafen	(Germany)	15–18 June	Prussia defeats Palatine rebels.
1849	Hungarian Revolution of 1848	Battle of Pered	(Slovakia)	20–21 June	Austria and Russia defeat Hungary.
1849	Baden Revolution	Battle of Waghäusel	(Germany)	21 June	Prussia defeats the revolutionary army of Baden and the Palatinate.
1849	Hungarian Revolution of 1848	Battle of Győr	(Hungary)	28 June	Austria and Russia defeat Hungary.
1849	Hungarian Revolution of 1848	Second Battle of Komárom	(Hungary)	2 July	Hungary defeats Austria and Russia.
1849	First Schleswig War	Battle of Fredericia	(Denmark)	6 July	Denmark defeats Schleswig-Holstein
1849	Hungarian Revolution of 1848	Third Battle of Komárom	(Hungary)	11 July	Austria and Russia defeat Hungary.
1849	Hungarian Revolution of 1848	Battle of Hegyes	(Serbia)	14 July	Hungary defeats Austria and Croatians.
1849	Hungarian Revolution of 1848	Battle of Segesvár	(Romania)	31 July	Hungarian forces under Bem defeated by Russians, Austrians under General Lüders and General Dyck
1849	Hungarian Revolution of 1848	Battle of Szőreg	(Hungary)	5 Aug	Austria and Russia defeat Hungary and the Polish and Italian legions.
1849	Hungarian Revolution of 1848	Battle of Temesvár	(Romania)	9 Aug	Austrian forces under Haynau defeat Hungarians under Görgey, Bem in final battle of war
1850	First Schleswig War	Battle of Isted	(Germany)	24–25 July	Denmark defeats Schleswig-Holstein

== 1851-1855 ==
Year	War	Battle	Loc.	Date(s)	Description
1851	Guatemalan–Salvadoran War	Battle of La Arada	(Guatemala)	2 Feb	Assured Guatemalan sovereignty
1851	1851 Chilean revolution	Combat of Monte de Urra	(Chile)	19 Nov	Chilean government defeats Revolutionaries and Mapuche.
1851	-	Bombardment of Salé	(Morocco)	26-27 Nov	French won battle, but withdraw from Morocco
1851	1851 Chilean Revolution	Battle of Loncomilla	(Chile)	8 Dec	Chilean government defeats revolutionaries, revolution ends
1852	Platine War, Argentine Civil Wars and Uruguayan Civil War	Battle of Monte Caseros	(Argentina)	3 Feb	A coalition of the Argentine Provinces of Entre Rios and Corrientes, allied with Brazilian and Uruguayan troops (27,000 men) defeats Buenos Aires forces (22,000 men) under Rosas, president of Argentina
1852	-	Battle of Dimawe	(Botswana)	Aug	Skirmish between Tswana tribes and Boers
1852	Zemene Mesafint	Battle of Gur Amba	(Ethiopia)	27 Sep	The future Emperor of Ethiopia Tewodros II defeats and kills the vassal of the current ruler, Ras Ali II
1852	-	Battle of Berea	(Lesotho)	20 Dec	British force under Cathcart invades Basutoland but is forced to withdraw by Chief Moshoeshoe
1853	Zemene Mesafint	Battle of Takusa	(Ethiopia)	12 April	Tewodros II defeats an allied army from the provinces of Tigray, Wollo, Yejju, and Gojjam led by Dejazmach Birru, who is killed
1853	Zemene Mesafint	Battle of Ayshal	(Ethiopia)	29 June	Tewodros II defeats Ras Ali II; considered the end of the Zemene Mesafint in Ethiopia
1853	Uruguayan Civil War and Platine War	Great Siege of Montevideo	(Uruguay)	16 Nov 1843 - 8 Oct 1851	
1853	Crimean War	Battle of Oltenitza	(Romania)	4 Nov	Russians defeated by Ottoman troops
1853	Crimean War	Battle of Akhaltsikhe	(Georgia (country))	24 Nov	
1853	Crimean War	Battle of Başgedikler	(Turkey)	1 Dec	
1854	Crimean War	Battle of Cetate		6 Jan	Ottoman troops defeat Russians
1854	Zemene Mesafint	Battle of Amba Jebelli	(Ethiopia)	March	Tewodros II defeats Birru Goshu of Gojjam
1854	Scramble for Africa	Berbera Confrontation	(Somalia)		Somali warriors attack Burton's expedition near Berbera, several attackers were shot, an expedition member was killed and Burton was wounded, they escaped by boat.
1854	Jicarilla War, Apache Wars, Ute Wars, and American Indian Wars	Battle of Ojo Caliente Canyon	(United States)	8 April	
1854	Crimean War	Bombardment of Odessa	(Ukraine)	22 April	Anglo-French warships attack the Russian port of Odesa
1854	Crimean War	Battle of Nigoiti	(Georgia (country))	20–27 May	Russian forces defeat Ottomans, the morale boost and achieved superiority allowing the strategic victory later at Choloki
1854	Crimean War	Battle of Choloki	(Georgia (country))	June 4	Russians defeat Ottomans on the outskirts of Kakuti
1854	Crimean War	Siege of Silistria	(Bulgaria)	11 May-23 June	Russians launch an attack at an Ottoman fort but are repelled
1854	Åland War and Crimean War	Battle of Bomarsund	(Finland)	Aug	
1854	Crimean War	Battle of Kurekdere	(Turkey)	6 Aug	
1854	Crimean War	Battle of Alma	(Ukraine)	20 Sep	British and French, under French general Arnaud, defeat a Russian army
1854	Apache Wars	Battle of the Diablo Mountains	(United States)	3 Oct	
1854	Crimean War	Battle of Balaclava	(Ukraine)	25 Oct	Charge of the Light Brigade on Crimea under Cardigan
1854	Crimean War	Battle of Inkerman	(Ukraine)	5 Nov	British, helped by French general Bosquet, defeat a Russian army
1854	Eureka Rebellion	Battle of the Eureka Stockade	(Australia)	3 Dec	British Army and Victoria Police defeat Eureka gold field rebels
1855	Zemene Mesafint	Battle of Derasge	(Ethiopia)	9 Feb	Tewodros II defeats Dejasmach Wube, deposing the last rival warlord of the Zemene Mesafint
1855	Crimean War	Battle of Eupatoria	(Ukraine)	17 Feb	Allies win naval battle
1855	Fijian Civil War	Battle of Kaba	(Fiji)	7 April	Skirmish between Fijian leader Seru Epenisa Cakobau and his enemies from surrounding islands Rewa and Bau
1855	-	Battle of Nam Quan	(China)	10 May	
1855	Crimean War	Siege of Taganrog	(Russia)	3 June-24 Nov	After numerous British and French attacks, Russians hold the city of Taganrog, albeit the city was in ruins
1855	Crimean War	Siege of Kars	(Turkey)	June–29 Nov	Russians defeat Ottoman troops
1855	Crimean War	Skirmish at the Genitchi Strait	(Ukraine)	3 July	British soldiers destroyed a strategic Russian pontoon bridge
1855	-	Battle of Ty-ho Bay	(China)	4 Aug	
1855	Åland War and Crimean War	Battle of Suomenlinna	(Finland)	9-11 Aug	Indecisive
1855	Crimean War	Battle of Traktir	(Ukraine)	16 Aug	French Army and Piedmontese troops defeat a Russian army near the Chyornaya river
1855	-	Battle of the Leotung	(China)	19 Aug	
1855	First Sioux War and American Indian Wars	Battle of Ash Hollow	(United States)	3 Sep	
1855	Crimean War	Battle of Malakoff	(Ukraine)	8 Sep	French Army, under General Pélissier and General MacMahon, takes Malakoff and defeat Russian army. Fall of the city of Sevastopol and end of the war.
1855	Crimean War	Battle of the Great Redan	(Ukraine)	8 Sep	British forces attack Russian forces in Sevastopol
1855	Crimean War	Siege of Sevastopol	(Ukraine)	17 Oct–9 Sep 1855	Allies capture the city
1855	Crimean War	Battle of Kinburn	(Ukraine)	17 Oct	
1855	Bleeding Kansas	Wakarusa War	(United States)	Nov-Dec	Truce reached between Charles L. Robinson who represented the Free-Staters and David Rice Atchison who represented the pro-slavers
1855	Dominican War of Independence	Battle of Santomé	(Dominican Republic)	22 Dec	

== 1856-1860 ==
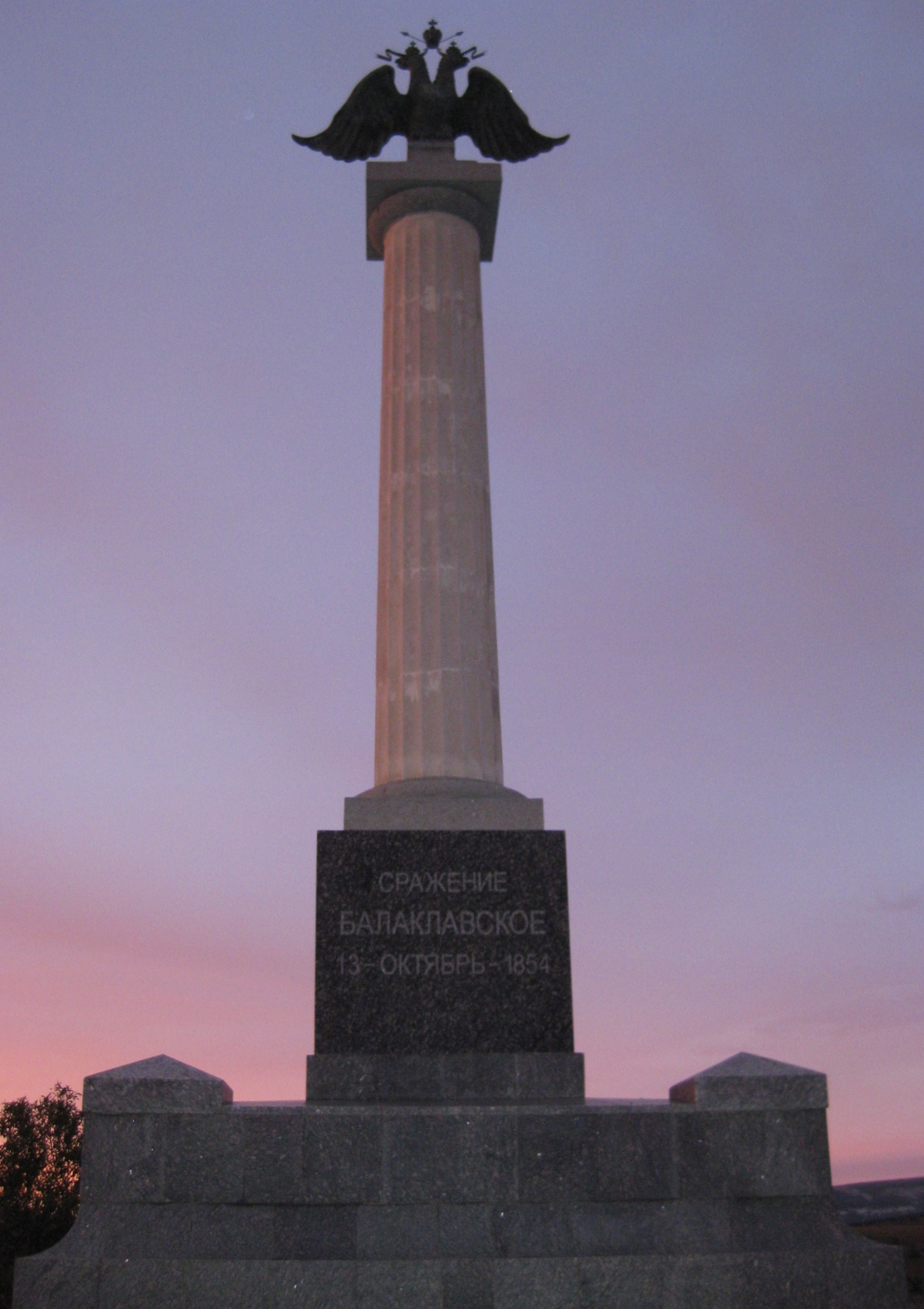
Crimean War monument, memorializing the Battle of Balaclava (1854)

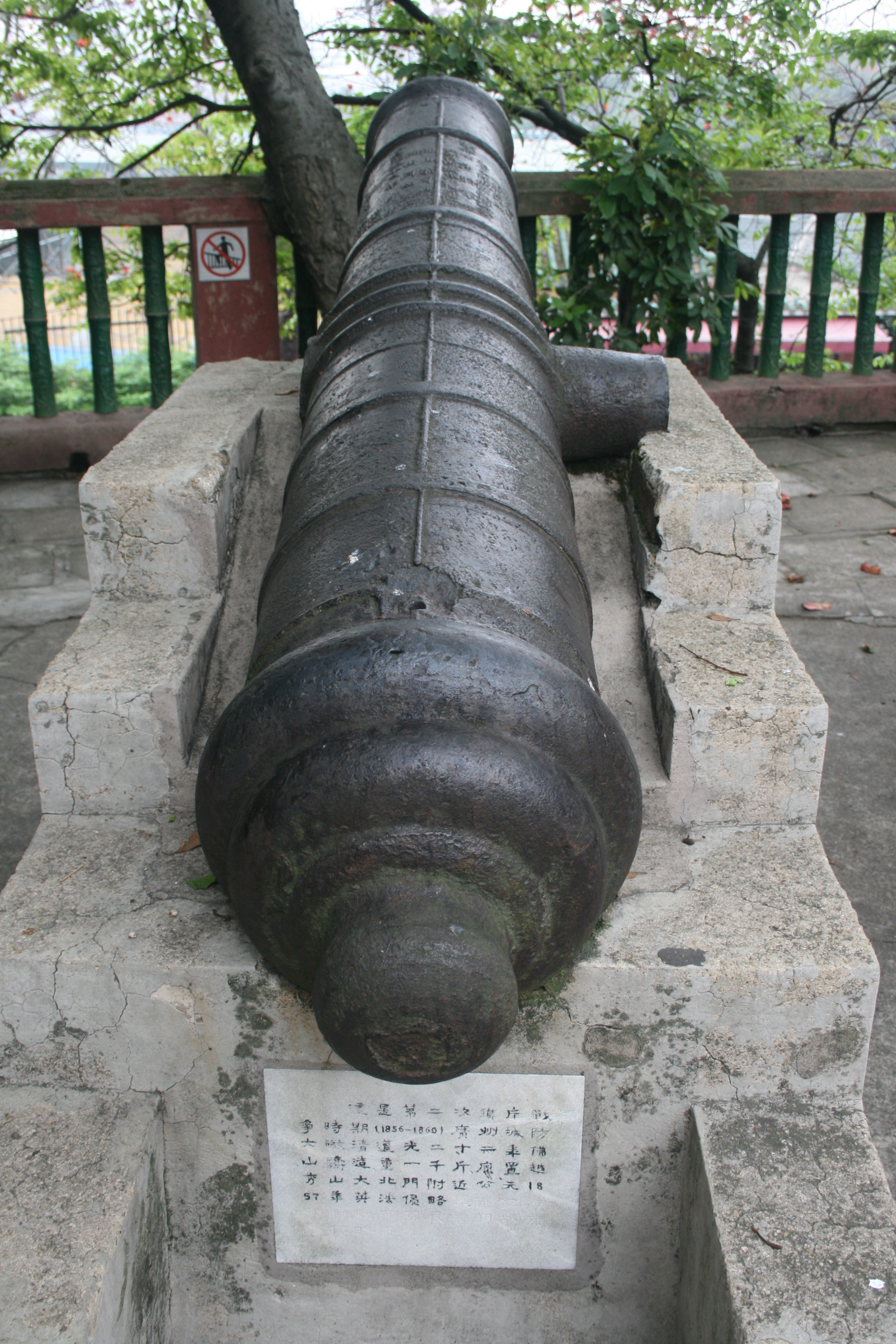
Cannon used during the Second Opium War (1856-1860)

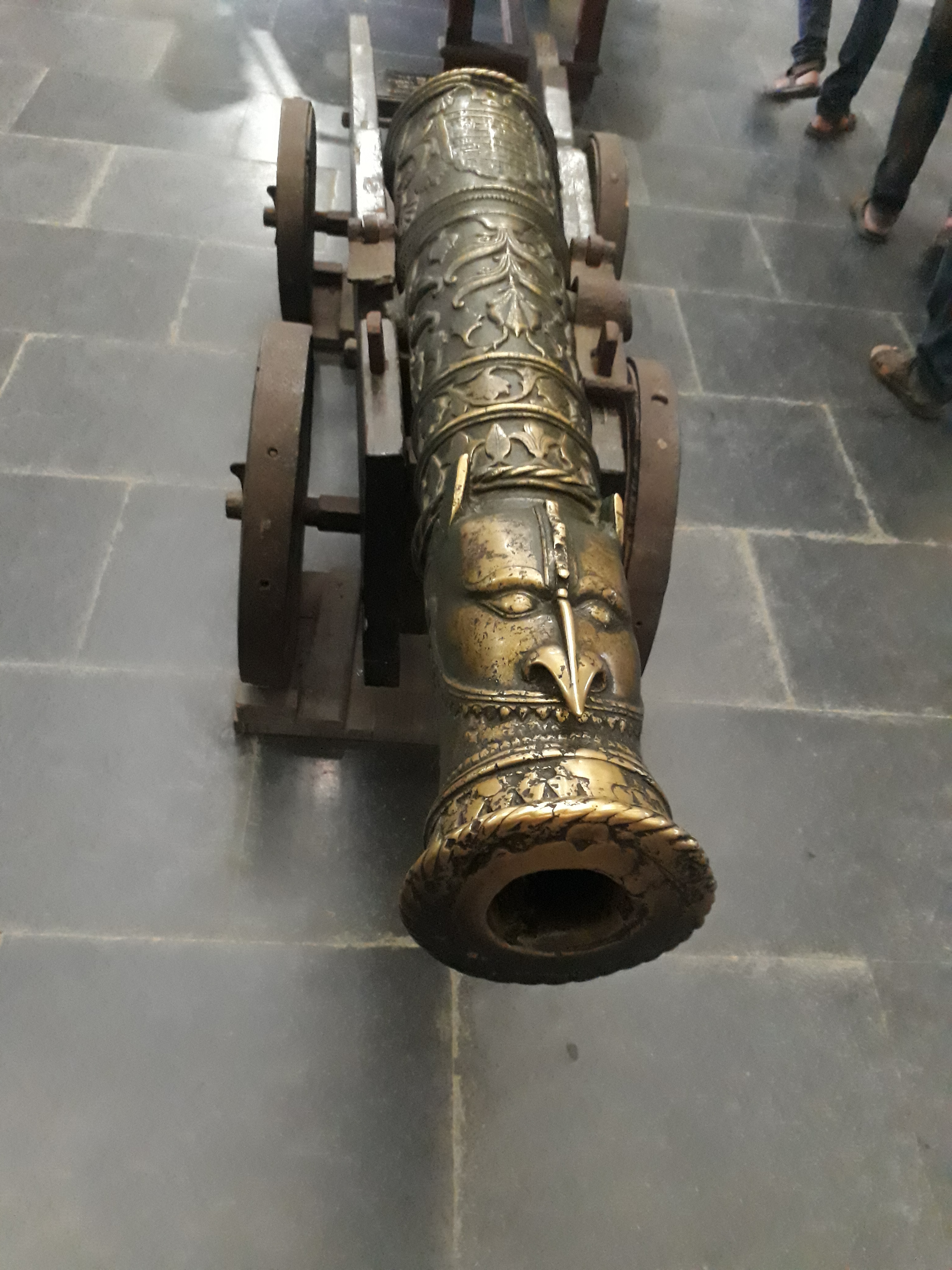
Cannon used during the Indian Rebellion of 1857

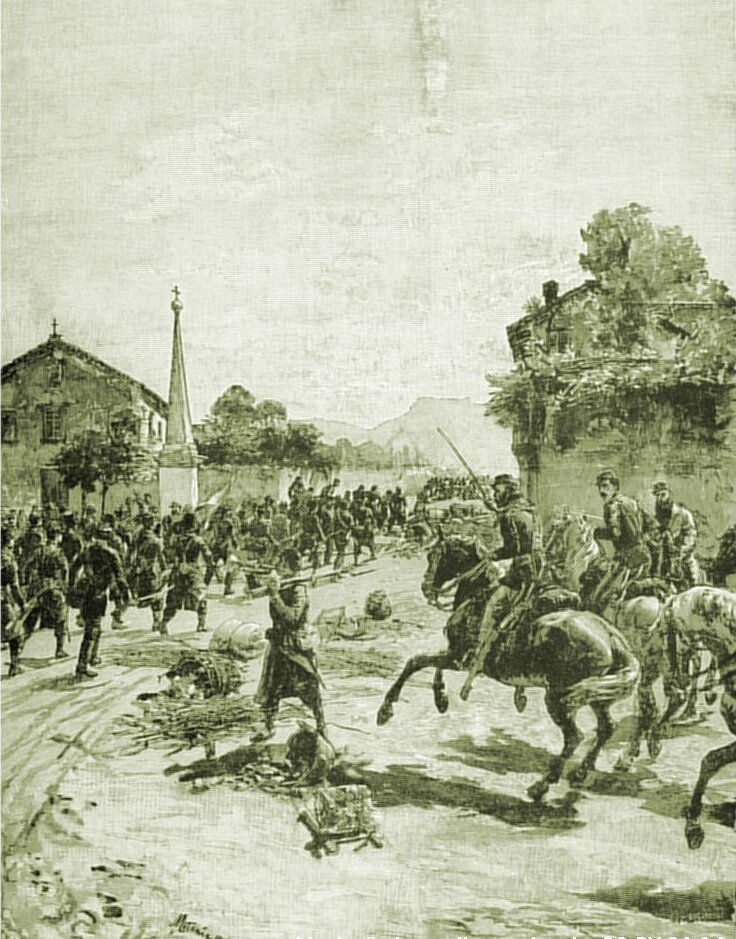
Lithograph of soldiers at the Battle of Varese (1859)

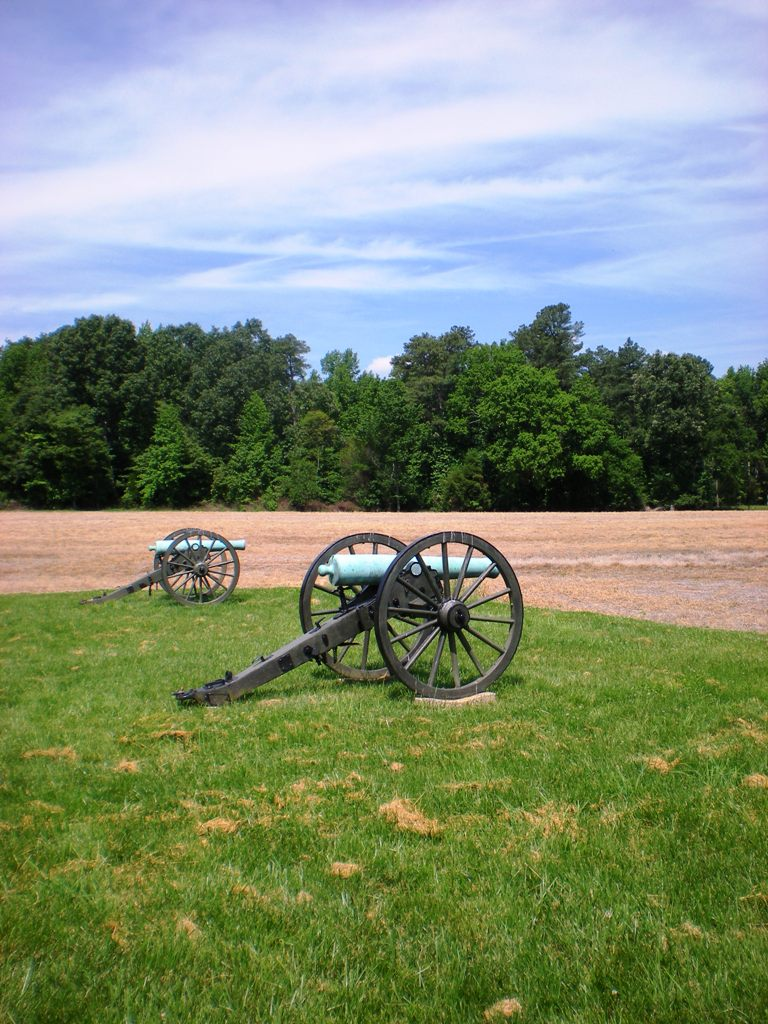
Cannon used at the Battle of Malvern Hill (1862)

Year	War	Battle	Loc.	Date(s)	Description
1856	Dominican War of Independence	Battle of Sabana Larga and Jácuba	(Dominican Republic)	24 Jan	
1856	Puget Sound War and Yakima War	First Battle of Seattle	(United States)	26 Jan	Marines from the USS Decatur drive off Native American attackers after all-day battle with settlers
1856	Filibuster War	Battle of Santa Rosa	(Costa Rica)	20 March	Costa Rican troops rout Walker's soldiers
1856	Filibuster War	Battle of Rivas	(Nicaragua)	11 April	Central American coalition defeats filibuster William Walker
1856	Bleeding Kansas	Sacking of Lawrence	(United States)	21 May	Border ruffian victory ,Lawrence, Kansas sacked
1856	Bleeding Kansas	Pottawatomie massacre	(United States)	23–24 May	Pottawatomie Rifles victory, five pro-slavery settlers killed
1856	Bleeding Kansas	Battle of Osawatomie	(United States)	30 Aug	Border ruffian victory ,Osawatomie, Kansas sacked
1856	-	Second Bombardment of Tourane	(Vietnam)	Sep 26	French forces attack Đà Nẵng again after Thiệu Trị forbids European contact
1856	Second Opium War	Battle of the Bogue	(China)	12–13 Nov	British victory
1856	Second Opium War	Battle of the Barrier Forts	(China)	16–24 Nov	
1857	Second Opium War	Battle of Macao Fort	(China)	4 Jan	
1857	Apache Wars	Battle of Cooke's Spring	(United States)	9 March	
1857	Second Opium War	Battle of Escape Creek	(China)	25–27 May	
1857	French colonial wars	Siege of Medina Fort	(Mali)	20 April - 18 July	Toucouleuri forces laid siege to French ones trapped at Médine
1857	Indian Rebellion of 1857	Siege of Cawnpore	(India)	5–25 June	British troops and civilians besieged and later betrayed and murdered
1857	French colonial wars	Battle of Icheriden	(Algeria)	24–30 June	France defeats the Kabyle people.
1857	Indian Rebellion of 1857	Battle of Chinhat	(India)	30 June	British troops retreat to Lucknow
1857	Clashes over Nativism in United States politics	Dead Rabbits riot	(United States)	4–5 July	Nativist Bowery Boys gang clash with Irish Dead Rabbits gang evolving from a small-scale street fight into a citywide gang war
1857	Indian Rebellion of 1857	Battle of Jhelum	(India)	7 July	Battle sparked by an attempt to disarm the 14th Bengal Native Infantry who mutinied and were then destroyed by a larger force
1857	Indian Rebellion of 1857	Battle of Aong	(India)	15 July	British forces under General Havelock capture Cawnpore
1857	Comanche Wars and Texas-Indian Wars	Battle of Devil's River	(United States)	20 July	
1857	Indian Rebellion of 1857	Siege of Lucknow	(India)	30 May – 27 Nov	Lucknow besieged by rebels, relieved, besieged again, and relieved for a second time
1858	Indian Rebellion of 1857	Battle of Malgram	(India)	9 Jan	British forces defeat Rajab Ali Khan of Chittagong
1858	Reform War	Battle of Celaya	(Mexico)	8–9 March	
1858	-	Battle of Grahovac	(Montenegro)	28 April – 1 May	Montenegro defeats Ottoman Army in Grahovac. This battle brought first official Turkish recognition of borders of Montenegro.
1858	Comanche Wars, Texas–Indian wars, and Apache Wars	Battle of Little Robe Creek	(United States)	12 May	
1858	Coeur d'Alene War and Yakima War	Battle of Pine Creek	(United States)	17 May	
1858	Reform War	Battle of Atenquique	(Mexico)	2 June	
1858	Coeur d'Alene War and Yakima War	Battle of Four Lakes	(United States)	1 Sep	
1858	Coeur d'Alene War and Yakima War	Battle of Spokane Plains	(United States)	5 Sep	
1858	Reform War	Battle of Ixtlahuaca	(Mexico)	18 Sep	
1858	Reform War	Battle of Ahualulco	(Mexico)	29 Sep	
1858	United States Fiji expeditions	1858 Fiji expedition	(Fiji)	6-16 Oct	United States defeats Fiji on punitive expedition after Fijians killed 2 American traders.
1858	Reform War	Battle of San Joaquín	(Mexico)	26 Dec	
1859	-	Battle of Logandème	(Senegal)	18 May	Serer people against French colonialism. French victory.
1859	Second Italian War of Independence	Battle of Montebello	(Italy)	20 May	French Army under General Forey defeat an Austrian army
1859	Second Italian War of Independence	Battle of Varese	(Italy)	26 May	Piedmontese defeat Austrians
1859	Second Italian War of Independence	Battle of San Fermo	(Italy)	27 May	
1859	Second Italian War of Independence	Battle of Palestro	(Italy)	30 May	French zouaves and Piedmontese defeat an Austrian army
1859	Second Italian War of Independence	Battle of Turbigo	(Italy)	3 June	
1859	Second Italian War of Independence	Battle of Magenta	(Italy)	4 June	French Army under Napoleon III defeat Austrian army under General Gyulay. Liberation of Milan.
1859	Second Italian War of Independence	Battle of Solferino	(Italy)	24 June	French Army and Piedmontese army under Napoleon III defeat an Austrian army under Franz Joseph. End of war.
1859	Reform War	Battle of Tlatempa	(Mexico)	5 July	
1859	Prelude to the American Civil War	Harper's Ferry raid	(United States)	16-18 Oct	John Brown defeated but the raid disrupted the status quo
1859	Reform War	Battle of Loma de las Ánimas	(Mexico)	1 Nov	
1859	Reform War	Battle of Estancia de las Vacas	(Mexico)	13 Nov	
1860	Hispano–Moroccan War (1859–1860)	Battle of Castillejos	(Morocco)	1 Jan	Spain defeats Morocco.
1860	Reform War	Battle of Loma Alta	(Mexico)	24 Jan	Mexican Liberals defeat Mexican Conservatives.
1860	Hispano–Moroccan War (1859–1860)	Battle of Tétouan	(Morocco)	4 Feb	Spain defeats Morocco.
1860	Reform War	Battle of Antón Lizardo	(Mexico)	6 March	A fleet of the USA and Mexican Liberals defeat Spain and Mexican Conservatives
1860	Unification of Italy	Battle of Calatafimi	(Italy)	15 May	Garibaldi's victory against Neapolitan troops
1860	Reform War	Battle of Peñuelas	(Mexico)	14 June	Mexican Liberals defeat Mexican Conservatives
1860	Unification of Italy	Battle of Milazzo	(Italy)	25 June	Garibaldi's victory against Neapolitan troops
1860	Reform War	Battle of Silao	(Mexico)	10 Aug	Mexican Liberals defeat Mexican Conservatives
1860	Unification of Italy	Battle of Castelfidardo	(Italy)	18 Sept	Italian victory over the Papal troops
1860	Unification of Italy	Battle of the Volturnus	(Italy)	1 Oct	Sicilians are defeated by the Piedmontese
1860	Apache Wars	Battle of the Mimbres River	(United States)	4 Dec	The USA defeat the Apache.
1860	American Indian Wars	Battle of Pease River	(United States)	19 Dec	The USA defeats the Comanche Noconi Band.
1860	Reform War	Battle of Calpulapan	(Mexico)	22 Dec	Mexican Liberals defeat Mexican Conservatives

== 1861-1865 ==
Year	War	Battle	Loc.	Date(s)	Description
1861	Unification of Italy	Siege of Gaeta	(Italy)	5 Nov 1860 – 13 Feb 1861	Frances II is sieged by the Piedmontese
1861	Cochinchina campaign	Battle of Kỳ Hòa	(Vietnam)	24–25 February	France and Spain defeat the Vietnamese of the Nguyễn dynasty.
1861	Peasant revolts in Russia	Bezdna unrest	(Russia)	April	peasant uprising suppressed , Anton Petrov the leader of the revolt executed .
1861	American Civil War	Battle of Fort Sumter	(United States)	12 April	Beauregard fires on fort – first important battle of American Civil War
1861	American Civil War	Battle of Sewell's Point	(United States)	18–19 May	Union gunboats fight inconclusive battle with Confederate artillery
1861	American Civil War	Battle of Aquia Creek	(United States)	29 May – 1 June	Confederate artillery hit by naval bombardment, later withdrawn
1861	American Civil War	Battle of Philippi Races	(United States)	3 June	Union troops under McClellan defeats rebels
1861	American Civil War	Battle of Big Bethel	(United States)	10 June	Union attack on Confederate positions near a church repelled
1861	American Civil War	Battle of Boonville	(United States)	17 June	Union forces defeat pro-Confederate governor's Missouri State Guard
1861	American Civil War	Battle of Hoke's Run	(United States)	2 July	Patterson defeats Confederate force but fails to capitalize on his victory
1861	American Civil War	Battle of Carthage	(United States)	5 July	Confederate victory
1861	American Civil War	Battle of Rich Mountain	(United States)	11 July	Confederate force split in half mid-battle; one half surrenders, the other escapes
1861	American Civil War	Battle of Blackburn's Ford	(United States)	18 July	McDowell defeated in recon-in-force against Confederate
1861	American Civil War	Battle of 1st Bull Run	(United States)	21 July	Union under McDowell lose to Confederate under Johnston, Beauregard, Jackson
1861	American Civil War	Battle of Athens	(United States)	5 Aug	Union victory in small skirmish
1861	American Civil War	Battle of Wilson's Creek	(United States)	10 Aug	Union forces lose
1861	American Civil War	Battle of Kessler's Cross Lanes	(United States)	26 Aug	Confederates surprise and defeat Union forces
1861	American Civil War	Battle of Hatteras Inlet Batteries	(United States)	28–29 Aug	Union forces capture two North Carolina forts
1861	American Civil War	Battle of Dry Wood Creek	(United States)	2 Sep	Union cavalry from Kansas defeated by Missouri State Guard
1861	American Civil War	Battle of Carnifex Ferry	(United States)	10 Sep	Confederates withdraw by night after several hours of fighting
1861	American Civil War	Battle of Cheat Mountain	(United States)	12–15 Sep	300 Union troops withstand uncoordinated Confederate attacks
1861	American Civil War	Battle of Liberty	(United States)	17 Sep	Minor Missouri State Guard victory
1861	American Civil War	Battle of Barbourville	(United States)	19 Sep	Confederate victory over Union forces
1861	American Civil War	First Battle of Lexington	(United States)	13–20 Sep	Union forces badly defeated by Missouri State Guard
1861	American Civil War	Battle of Canada Alamosa	(United States)	24–25 Sep	
1861	American Civil War and Apache Wars	Battle of Pinos Altos	(United States)	27 Sep	
1861	American Civil War	Battle of Greenbrier River	(United States)	3 Oct	Confederates withdraw after inconclusive battle
1861	American Civil War	Battle of Cockle Creek	(United States)	5 Oct	
1861	American Civil War	Battle of Santa Rosa Island	(United States)	9 Oct	Union forces capture island
1861	American Civil War	Battle of the Head of Passes	(United States)	12 Oct	
1861	American Civil War	Battle of Bolivar Heights	(United States)	16 Oct	Union victory
1861	American Civil War	Battle of Camp Wildcat	(United States)	21 Oct	Union victory over Confederate forces
1861	American Civil War	Battle of Leesburg	(United States)	21 Oct	1900 Union soldiers die
1861	American Civil War	Battle of Fredericktown	(United States)	21 Oct	Missouri State Guard defeated
1861	American Civil War	First Battle of Springfield	(United States)	25 Oct	Union forces capture town
1861	American Civil War	Battle of Belmont	(United States)	7 Nov	Grant captures and destroys Confederate supplies
1861	American Civil War	Battle of Ivy Mountain	(United States)	8 Nov	Union victory over Confederate forces
1861	American Civil War	Battle of Round Mountain	(United States)	19 Nov	Confederate forces defeat Opothleyahola
1861	American Civil War	Battle of Chusto-Talasah	(United States)	9 Dec	Opothleyahola defeated
1861	American Civil War	Battle of Camp Alleghany	(United States)	13 Dec	Confederates withstand Union attack
1861	American Civil War	Battle of Rowlett's Station	(United States)	17 Dec	Inconclusive
1861	American Civil War	Battle of Dranesville	(United States)	20 Dec	Union defeats Confederate forces under Stuart
1861	American Civil War	Battle of Chustenahlah	(United States)	26 Dec	Opothleyahola defeated, flees to Kansas
1861	American Civil War	Battle of Mount Zion Church	(United States)	28 Dec	Union victory
1862	American Civil War	Battle of Cockpit Point	(United States)	3 Jan	Inconclusive
1862	American Civil War	Battle of Hancock	(United States)	5–6 Jan	Unsuccessful Confederate attack
1862	American Civil War	Battle of Roan's Tan Yard	(United States)	8 Jan	Confederates routed
1862	American Civil War	Battle of Middle Creek	(United States)	10 Jan	Union forces under Garfield defeat Confederates under Marshall
1862	American Civil War	Battle of Lucas Bend	(United States)	11 Jan	Inconclusive, Confederates escape from Union forces
1862	American Civil War	Battle of Mill Springs	(United States)	19 Jan	Union victory, Zollicoffer killed
1862	American Civil War	Battle of Fort Henry	(United States)	6 Feb	US commander Grant and gunboats under Foote take fort and gain control of Tennessee River
1862	American Civil War	Battle of Roanoke Island	(United States)	7–8 Feb	Union forces under Burnside capture island
1862	American Civil War	Battle of Elizabeth City	(United States)	10 Feb	Destruction of the Mosquito Fleet
1862	American Civil War	Battle of Fort Donelson	(United States)	11–16 Feb	Grant takes fort, accepts surrender of Confederate army, and gains control of Cumberland River
1862	American Civil War	Battle of Valverde	(United States)	20–21 Feb	Union forces routed in New Mexico Territory
1862	American Civil War	Battle of Pea Ridge	(United States)	7 March	Union victory
1862	American Civil War	Battle of Hampton Roads	(United States)	9 March	Union USS Monitor defeats USS Merrimac
1862	American Civil War	Battle of New Bern	(United States)	14 March	Union troops disembark from ships and capture town
1862	American Civil War	First Battle of Kernstown	(United States)	23 March	Union forces defeat Confederates under Jackson
1862	American Civil War	Battle of Glorieta Pass	(United States)	26–28 March	Union forces outmaneuver Confederates.
1862	American Civil War	Battle of Shiloh	(United States)	6–7 April	Grant attacked by Johnston and Beauregard, defeats them
1862	American Civil War	Battle of Island Number Ten	(United States)	28 Feb – 8 April	Union victory by Pope
1862	American Civil War	Battle of Ft. Pulaski	(United States)	10–11 April	Union takes fort
1862	American Civil War	Battle of Peralta	(United States)	15 April	Union forces defeat the 5th Texas Mounted Volunteers
1862	American Civil War	Battle of South Mills	(United States)	19 April	Confederates thwart attempt to destroy a canal
1862	American Civil War	Battle of Fort Macon	(United States)	23 March – 26 April	Confederate fort surrenders after Union artillery bombardment
1862	American Civil War	Battle of Forts Jackson and St. Philip	(United States)	18–28 April	Union victory for possession of New Orleans
1862	American Civil War	Battle of New Orleans	(United States)	25 April – 1 May	Union forces capture city
1862	American Civil War	Battle of Yorktown	(United States)	5 April – 4 May	Union troops win skirmish
1862	Second French intervention in Mexico	Battle of Puebla	(Mexico)	5 May	Mexicans defeat French
1862	American Civil War	Battle of Williamsburg	(United States)	5 May	McClellan and Longstreet fight inconclusive battle
1862	American Civil War	Battle of Eltham's Landing	(United States)	7 May	Inconclusive
1862	American Civil War	Battle of McDowell	(United States)	8–9 May	Jackson's Confederates defeat Union forces
1862	American Civil War	Battle of Drewry's Bluff	(United States)	15 May	Union naval attack repelled by Confederate artillery
1862	American Civil War	Battle of Princeton Court House	(United States)	15–17 May	Confederate victory over Union forces
1862	American Civil War	Battle of Whitney's Lane	(United States)	19 May	Union campaign towards Little Rock, Arkansas halted
1862	American Civil War	Battle of Front Royal	(United States)	23 May	Jackson forces Union retreat by threatening the rear of the Union force
1862	American Civil War	First Battle of Winchester	(United States)	25 May	Confederates undr Jackson defeats Banks
1862	American Civil War	Battle of Hanover Courthouse	(United States)	27 May	Union victory
1862	American Civil War	Siege of Corinth	(United States)	29 April – 30 May	Union forces capture town, Beauregard tricks Union in order to escape to Tupelo
1862	American Civil War	Battle of Seven Pines	(United States)	31 May	Johnston attacks Union forces, wounded, inconclusive
1862	American Civil War	Battle of Tranter's Creek	(United States)	5 June	Confederate forces retreat after Colonel Singletary is killed
1862	American Civil War	First Battle of Memphis	(United States)	6 June	Union forces capture the city
1862	American Civil War	First Battle of Chattanooga	(United States)	7–8 June	Union forces bombard the town
1862	American Civil War	Battle of Cross Keys	(United States)	8 June	Union under Frémont defeated by elements of Jackson's force
1862	American Civil War	Battle of Port Republic	(United States)	9 June	Costly victory for Confederates under Jackson
1862	American Civil War	Battle of Secessionville	(United States)	16 June	Union fails to take town, Union commander later court-martialed for disobeying orders
1862	American Civil War	Battle of Saint Charles	(United States)	17 June	The USS Mound City is hit by Confederate shore gun and explodes
1862	American Civil War	Battle of Simmon's Bluff	(United States)	21 June	Minor bloodless victory by Union forces
1862	American Civil War	Battle of Oak Grove	(United States)	25 June	Indecisive battle between McClellan and Lee
1862	American Civil War	Battle of Beaver Dam Creek	(United States)	26 June	Confederate Lee defeated.
1862	American Civil War	Battle of Gaines' Mill	(United States)	27 June	Confederates under Lee defeats McClellan.
1862	American Civil War	Battle of Garnett's & Golding's Farm	(United States)	27–28 June	Indecisive battle between Confederates of Lee and McClellan.
1862	American Civil War	Battle of Savage's Station	(United States)	29 June	Union forces withdraw
1862	American Civil War	Battle of White Oak Swamp	(United States)	30 June	Indecisive artillery duel
1862	American Civil War	Battle of Glendale	(United States)	30 June	McClellan retreats from Lee's Confederates
1862	American Civil War	Battle of Tampa	(United States)	30 June – 1 July	Union gunboat attacks, but later withdraws.
1862	American Civil War	Battle of Malvern Hill	(United States)	1 July	McClellan defeats Lee but withdraws after battle.
1862	American Civil War	Battle of Locust Grove	(United States)	3 July	Union victory
1862	American Civil War	Battle of Hill's Plantation	(United States)	7 July	Union victory
1862	American Civil War	Battle of Cotton Plant	(United States)	7 July	Union victory
1862	American Civil War	First Battle of Murfreesboro	(United States)	13 July	Confederate victory
1862	American Civil War	Battle of Apache Pass	(United States)	15–16 July	The USA defeats the Apache
1862	American Civil War	Battle of Moore's Mill	(United States)	28 July	Union victory over the Confederates
1862	American Civil War	Battle of Baton Rouge	(United States)	5 Aug	Union victory over the Confederates
1862	American Civil War	Battle of Kirksville	(United States)	6–9 Aug	Union forces capture town
1862	American Civil War	Battle of Cedar Mountain	(United States)	9 Aug	Union forces repelled by Confederate counter-attack
1862	American Civil War	First Battle of Donaldsonville	(United States)	9 Aug	Minor bloodless victory by Union forces
1862	American Civil War	First Battle of Independence	(United States)	11 Aug	Confederate victory
1862	American Civil War	Battle of Lone Jack	(United States)	15–16 Aug	Confederate victory, Union commander killed. Confederates forced to withdraw after battle.
1862	American Civil War	Battle of Redwood Ferry	(United States)	18 Aug	The Santee Sioux defeats the USA
1862	Dakota War of 1862 and American Civil War	Battle of Fort Ridgely	(United States)	21–22 Aug	Failed Santee Sioux attack on Union-controlled fort
1862	American Civil War	First Battle of Rappahannock Station	(United States)	22–25 Aug	Union supplies destroyed during skirmish
1862	American Civil War	Battle of Bull Run Bridge	(United States)	25-27 Aug	Confederates capture and destroy Manassas Station
1862	American Civil War	Battle of Thoroughfare Gap	(United States)	28 Aug	Longstreet defeats small Union
1862	Unification of Italy	Battle of Aspromonte	(Italy)	29 Aug	Royal Italian Army defeats rebels
1862	American Civil War	Battle of 2nd Bull Run	(United States)	30 Aug	Jackson, Lee, and Longstreet destroys Pope's Army of Northern Virginia
1862	American Civil War	Battle of Richmond	(United States)	30 Aug	Confederates under Smith rout Union army under Nelson
1862	American Civil War	Battle of Chantilly	(United States)	1 Sep	Union forces escape from nearly being cut off, Kearny is killed
1862	American Civil War	Battle of Mile Hill	(United States)	2 Sep	Confederates clear Leesburg of Union forces
1862	American Civil War	Second Battle of Corinth	(United States)	3–4 Sep	Confederate attack fails
1862	American Civil War	Battle of Harpers Ferry	(United States)	12–15 Sep	Jackson captures Union garrison
1862	American Civil War	Battle of South Mountain	(United States)	14 Sep	Union commander McClellan defeats Lee
1862	American Civil War	Battle of Munfordville	(United States)	14–17 Sep	Union force surrenders
1862	American Civil War	Battle of Antietam	(United States)	17 Sep	Union commander McClellan ends Lee's invasion of North, bloodiest day of war
1862	American Civil War	Battle of Iuka	(United States)	19 Sep	Union commander Grant is victorious
1862	American Civil War	Battle of Shepherdstown	(United States)	19–20 Sep	Confederate brigades counterattack and defeat pursuing Union brigades
1862	Dakota War of 1862	Battle of Wood Lake	(United States)	23 Sep	US victory over the Lakota
1862	American Civil War	First Battle of Sabine Pass	(United States)	24–25 Sep	Minor bloodless victory by Union forces
1862	American Civil War	Battle of Augusta	(United States)	27 Sep	Confederates defeat the Union
1862	American Civil War	First Battle of Newtonia	(United States)	30 Sep	Union forces panic under bombardment from Confederate artillery
1862	American Civil War	Battle of St. John's Bluff	(United States)	1–3 Oct	Bloodless victory by Union forces
1862	American Civil War	Battle of Galveston Harbor	(United States)	4 Oct	Bloodless Union victory
1862	American Civil War	Battle of Hatchie Bridge	(United States)	5 Oct	Confederate force under Van Dorn escapes across river
1862	American Civil War	Battle of Perryville	(United States)	8 Oct	Union under Buell v. Bragg, indecisive
1862	American Civil War	Battle of Old Fort Wayne	(United States)	22 Oct	Union defeats Confederates
1862	American Civil War	Battle of Georgia Landing	(United States)	27 Oct	Union defeats Confederates
1862		Battle of Santa Croce di Magliano	(Italy)	5 Nov	Brigands defeat Italy
1862	American Civil War	Battle of Clark's Mill	(United States)	7 Nov	Union force surrenders to larger Confederate force
1862	American Civil War	Battle of Cane Hill	(United States)	28 Nov	Small Confederate force delays Union while larger force escapes
1862	American Civil War	Battle of Prairie Grove	(United States)	7 Dec	Union secures northwest Arkansas
1862	American Civil War	Battle of Hartsville	(United States)	7 Dec	Disguised in Union uniforms, Confederates infiltrate and defeat Union forces
1862	American Civil War	Battle of Fredericksburg	(United States)	13 Dec	Confederates under Lee routs Burnside
1862	American Civil War	Battle of Kinston	(United States)	14 Dec	Union forces under Foster defeat Confederates under Evans.
1862	American Civil War	Battle of White Hall	(United States)	16 Dec	Foster fights indecisive battle with Robertson
1862	American Civil War	Battle of Goldsborough Bridge	(United States)	17 Dec	Foster defeats Confederates and destroys the bridge
1862	American Civil War	Battle of Jackson, Tennessee	(United States)	19 Dec	Confederate feint to distract Union forces
1862	American Civil War	Battle of Chickasaw Bayou	(United States)	26–29 Dec	Union attack on Confederate right flank thwarted
1862	American Civil War	Battle of Parker's Cross Roads	(United States)	31 Dec	Confederates repel Union double-pronged assault
1862	American Civil War	Battle of Murfreesboro	(United States)	31 Dec 1862 – 2 Jan 1863	Union victory over Confederates
1863	American Civil War	Second Battle of Springfield	(United States)	8 Jan	Confederates enter town, but are unable to take nearby fort
1863	American Civil War	Battle of Arkansas Post	(United States)	9 Jan	Fight for control of mouth of Arkansas River
1863	American Civil War	Battle of Hartville	(United States)	9–11 Jan	Confederates are victorious, but unable to continue raid
1863	January Uprising	Battle of Ciołków	(Poland)	22 Jan	First skirmish of January Uprising
1863	January Uprising	Battle of Szydłowiec	(Poland)	22-23 Jan	Polish insurgents raid Szydłowiec
1863	January Uprising	Battle of Lubartów	(Poland)	22-23 Jan	Failed Polish attack on Lubartów
1863	American Indian Wars	Bear River Massacre	(United States)	29 Jan	Shoshone forces massacred by Union troops
1863	American Civil War	Battle of Deserted House	(United States)	30 Jan	
1863	American Civil War	Battle of Dover	(United States)	3 Feb	Failed Confederate attack on town
1863	January Uprising	Battle of Węgrów	(Poland)	3 Feb	Russians recapture town taken by Poles
1863	January Uprising	Battle of Rawa	(Poland)	4 Feb	Poles defeat Russians
1863	January Uprising	Battle of Sosnowiec	(Poland)	6-7 Feb	Polish victory
1863	January Uprising	Battle of Siemiatycze	(Poland)	6-7 Feb	Russians defeat Polish insurgents
1863	January Uprising	Battle of Słupcza	(Poland)	8 Feb	Failed Polish attack
1863	January Uprising	Battle of Miechów	(Poland)	17 Feb	Russians foil a Polish attack
1863	January Uprising	Battle of Staszów	(Poland)	17 Feb	Indecisive battle between Poland and Russia
1863	January Uprising	Battle of Krzywosądz	(Poland)	19 Feb	Russians defeat poles
1863	January Uprising	First Battle of Nowa Wieś	(Poland)	21 Feb	Ludwik Mierosławski resigns as leader of uprising
1863	January Uprising	Battle of Dobra	(Poland)	24 Feb	Poles get ambushed
1863	January Uprising	Battle of Małogoszcz	(Poland)	24 Feb	Polish forced to retreat
1863	January Uprising	Battle of Mrzygłód	(Poland)	1 March	Poles defeat Russians
1863	January Uprising	Battle of Pieskowa Skała	(Poland)	4 March	Polish victory
1863	January Uprising	Battle of Skała	(Poland)	5 March	Poles defeat Russians
1863	American Civil War	Battle of Thompson's Station	(United States)	5 March	Confederate victory
1863	American Civil War	Battle of Fort Anderson	(United States)	13–15 March	Hill leads unsuccessful Confederate attack on New Bern
1863	January Uprising	Battle of Chroberz	(Poland)	17 March	Pyrrhic Polish victory
1863	American Civil War	Battle of Kelly's Ford	(United States)	17 March	Indecisive cavalry battle
1863	January Uprising	Battle of Grochowiska	(Poland)	18 March	One of the bloodiest battles of the uprising
1863	American Civil War	Battle of Vaught's Hill	(United States)	20 March	Union forces withstand attack by Morgan's Confederates
1863	January Uprising	Battle of Igołomia	(Poland)	21 March	Poles attack and then escape
1863	January Uprising	Battle of Krasnobród	(Poland)	24 March	Russians defeat Poles
1863	American Civil War	Battle of Brentwood	(United States)	25 March	Union force surrenders
1863	American Civil War	First Battle of Franklin	(United States)	10 April	Confederates withdraw after rearguard defeat
1863	January Uprising	Battle of Praszka	(Poland)	11 April	Poles surprise and ambush Russians
1863	January Uprising	Battle of Buda Zaborowska	(Poland)	14 April	Russians attack Poles
1863	January Uprising	Battle of Borowe Młyny	(Poland)	16 April	Unknown victor
1863	American Civil War	Grierson's Raid	(United States)	17 April	Deep Union cavalry raid toward Baton Rouge, Louisiana serves as a diversion of Confederate forces during Grant's Vicksburg campaign
1863	American Civil War	Battle of Washington	(United States)	30 March – 19 April	Hill unable to take North Carolina town from Union forces
1863	January Uprising	Battle of Genėtiniai	(Lithuania)	21 April	Lithuanians defeat Russians
1863	American Civil War	Battle of Newton's Station	(United States)	24 April	
1863	American Civil War	Battle of Cape Girardeau	(United States)	26 April	Confederate attack fails
1863	January Uprising	Second Battle of Nowa Wieś	(Poland)	26 April	Poles under a Frenchman defeat Russians
1863	American Civil War	Battle of Grand Gulf	(United States)	29 April	Unsuccessful naval attack by Grant's forces
1863	January Uprising	Battle of Pyzdry	(Poland)	29 April	Major Polish victory
1863	American Civil War	Battle of Day's Gap	(United States)	30 April	Union victory
1863	Second French intervention in Mexico	Battle of Camarón	(Mexico)	30 April	
1863	American Civil War	Battle of Snyder's Bluff	(United States)	29 April – 1 May	Union feint during Vicksburg Campaign
1863	American Civil War	Battle of Port Gibson	(United States)	1 May	Grant defeats Confederates
1863	American Civil War	Battle of Chalk Bluff	(United States)	1–2 May	Confederates win but can't continue raid
1863	American Civil War	Battle of Chancellorsville	(United States)	2 May	Lee defeats Hooker's Army of Potomac, Jackson killed
1863	American Civil War	Second Battle of Fredericksburg	(United States)	3 May	Union forces under Sedgwick defeat Confederate forces left to guard the town by Lee
1863	American Civil War	Battle of Suffolk	(United States)	11 April – 4 May	Twin indecisive battles at Norfleet House and Hill's Point fought over town
1863	American Civil War	Battle of Salem Church	(United States)	3–4 May	Lee defeats Sedgwick
1863	January Uprising	Battle of Stok	(Poland)	4–5 May	One of the biggest Polish victories
1863	January Uprising	Battle of Krzykawka	(Poland)	5 May	Russians defeat Italians and Poles
1863	January Uprising	Battle of Kobylanka	(Poland)	6 May	Poles clash with Russians
1863	January Uprising	First Battle of Ignacewo	(Poland)	8 May	Russians defeat and massacre Poles
1863	January Uprising	Battle of Biržai	(Lithuania)	7–9 May	Lithuanian insurrection defeated
1863	January Uprising	Battle of Huta Krzeszowska	(Poland)	11 May	Russian victory
1863	American Civil War	Battle of Raymond	(United States)	12 May	Failed Confederate attempt to protect Vicksburg from approaching Union army
1863	American Civil War	Battle of Jackson	(United States)	14 May	Sherman, McPherson defeat Johnston
1863	American Civil War	Battle of Champion Hill	(United States)	16 May	Grant defeats Confederates
1863	January Uprising	Battle of Miropol	(Ukraine)	16–17 May	Russian victory
1863	American Civil War	Battle of Big Black River Bridge	(United States)	17 May	Confederate forces trapped in Vicksburg
1863	American Civil War	Battle of Plains Store	(United States)	21 May	Union victory
1863	January Uprising	Battle of Horki	(Belarus)	17–25 May	Russian victory
1863	January Uprising	Battle of Salicha	(Ukraine)	26 May	Pivotal battle in uprising
1863	January Uprising	First Battle of Chruślina	(Poland)	30 May	Pyrrhic victory for Russians
1863	January Uprising	Battle of Nagoszewo	(Poland)	2–3 June	Russian victory
1863	American Civil War	Battle of Milliken's Bend	(United States)	7 June	Confederates unable to break siege of Vicksburg
1863	American Civil War	Battle of Brandy Station	(United States)	9 June	Pleasonton surprises Stuart's cavalrymen in their camps
1863	American Civil War	Second Battle of Winchester	(United States)	13–15 June	Confederate victory paves way for Lee's invasion
1863	January Uprising	Battle of Lututów	(Poland)	15 June	Polish attack on Lututów fails
1863	American Civil War	Battle of Aldie	(United States)	17 June	Indecisive battle during Lee's march north
1863	American Civil War	Battle of Middleburg	(United States)	17–19 June	Stuart retreats from engagement with Union cavalry
1863	January Uprising	Battle of Komorów	(Poland)	20 June	Russian victory
1863	American Civil War	Battle of LaFourche Crossing	(United States)	20–21 June	
1863	American Civil War	Battle of Upperville	(United States)	21 June	Indecisive cavalry battle during Lee's invasion
1863	American Civil War	Battle of Hoover's Gap	(United States)	24–26 June	Union victory prevents Confederates in Tennessee from coming to the aid of Vicksburg
1863	American Civil War	Battle of Goodrich's Landing	(United States)	29–30 June	Confederates drive Union Black Regiments off of several plantations
1863	American Civil War	Battle of Hanover	(United States)	30 June	Stuart forced to change his route, delaying his efforts to unite with Lee's force outside Gettysburg
1863	American Civil War	Battle of Gettysburg	(United States)	1–3 July	Lee loses to Meade, Pickett's Charge fails, ends second invasion of North
1863	American Civil War	Battle of Vicksburg	(United States)	4 July	Siege from 22 May ends, Grant accepts surrender of second Confederate army
1863	American Civil War	Battle of Helena	(United States)	4 July	Confederate assault on river port fails securing eastern Arkansas for Union
1863	American Civil War	Battle of Boonsboro	(United States)	8 July	Indecisive action at rearguard of Lee's retreat
1863	American Civil War	Siege of Port Hudson	(United States)	21 May – 9 July	Last Confederate stronghold on Mississippi surrenders
1863	American Civil War	Battle of Corydon	(United States)	9 July	Confederate raid results in civilian casualties
1863	January Uprising	Battle of Ossa	(Poland)	10 July	Polish victory
1863	American Civil War	First Assault on Morris Island	(United States)	11 July	First of two Union attempts to take Fort Wagner
1863	American Civil War	Battle of Kock's Plantation	(United States)	12–13 July	
1863	American Civil War	New York City draft riots	(United States)	13–16 July	US Victory, Riots suppressed
1863	January Uprising	Battle of Coștangalia	(Moldova)	15 July	Polish insurrects defeated Romanian forces
1863	American Civil War	Battle of Williamsport	(United States)	6–16 July	Meade and Lee fight indecisive battle
1863	American Civil War	Battle of Honey Springs	(United States)	17 July	In Indian Territory, two largely Black and Native American forces meet. Union victory.
1863	American Civil War	Battle of Fort Wagner, Morris Island	(United States)	18 July	Second of two Union attempts to take Fort Wagner fails, heroism of the 54th Massachusetts
1863	American Civil War	Battle of Buffington Island	(United States)	19 July	
1863	American Civil War	Battle of Manassas Gap	(United States)	23 July	Indecisive battle by day, Confederates withdraw by night
1863	Sioux Wars and American Civil War	Battle of Big Mound	(United States)	24–25 July	Union forces defeat Santee, Yankton, Yanktonai and Teton Sioux troops
1863	Sioux Wars and American Civil War	Battle of Dead Buffalo Lake	(United States)	26 July	Sibley defeats Sioux forces
1863	American Civil War	Battle of Salineville	(United States)	26 July	Confederate Morgan surrenders in Ohio
1863	Sioux Wars and American Civil War	Battle of Stony Lake	(United States)	28 July	Sioux forces escape Union forces in pursuit
1863	January Uprising	Second Battle of Chruślina	(Poland)	4 Aug	Polish victory
1863	January Uprising	Battle of Depułtycze	(Poland)	5 Aug	Polish victory
1863	January Uprising	Battle of Żyrzyn	(Poland)	8 Aug	Polish victory
1863	January Uprising	Battle of Złoczew	(Poland)	22 Aug	Russian victory, Poles withdraw
1863	American Civil War	Battle of Lawrence	(United States)	23 Aug	Quantrill's Raiders pillage the city
1863	January Uprising	Battle of Fajsławice	(Poland)	24 Aug	Decisive Polish defeat
1863	January Uprising	Battle of Sędziejowice	(Poland)	26 Aug	Polish victory
1863	American Civil War	Battle of Devil's Backbone	(United States)	1 Sep	Union victory after heavy fighting
1863	January Uprising	Battle of Panasówka	(Poland)	3 Sep	Polish victory
1863	Sioux Wars and American Civil War	Battle of Whitestone Hill	(United States)	3–5 Sep	Union soldiers defeat Sioux forces
1863	January Uprising	Battle of Sowia Góra	(Poland)	6 Sep	Russians defeat Poles and Hungarians
1863	American Civil War	Second Battle of Sabine Pass	(United States)	8 Sep	Confederate forces place stakes in river to help aim their guns at Union ships, Confederate victory
1863	American Civil War	Second Battle of Chattanooga	(United States)	21 Aug – 8 Sep	Union captures town
1863	American Civil War	Second Battle of Fort Sumter	(United States)	17 Aug – 9 Sep	Union attempt to retake Fort fails even after massive bombardment and naval attack
1863	American Civil War	Battle of Bayou Fourche	(United States)	10 Sep	Union victory allows for capture of Little Rock, Arkansas
1863	American Civil War	Battle of Davis' Cross Roads	(United States)	10–11 Sep	Union forces establish defensive positions prior to Chickamauga
1863	American Civil War	Battle of Chickamauga	(United States)	19 Sep	Bragg defeats Rosecrans
1863	American Civil War	Battle of Blountville	(United States)	22 Sep	Union forces capture town
1863	American Civil War	Battle of Stirling's Plantation	(United States)	29 Sep	
1863	January Uprising	Battle of Mełchów	(Poland)	30 Sep	Polish and Hungarian forces defeat Russians
1863	American Civil War	Battle of Baxter Springs	(United States)	6 Oct	Quantrill's Raiders massacre Union Black Regiments
1863	American Civil War	Battle of Blue Springs	(United States)	10 Oct	Confederate forces overrun
1863	American Civil War	First Battle of Collierville	(United States)	11 Oct	Union victory
1863	American Civil War	First Battle of Auburn	(United States)	13 Oct	Stuart escapes by hiding in a ravine
1863	American Civil War	Second Battle of Auburn	(United States)	14 Oct	Confederates attack Union rearguard, indecisive
1863	American Civil War	Battle of Bristoe Station	(United States)	14 Oct	Meade defeats elements of Lee's forces, but Confederates destroy railroad during retreat
1863	American Civil War	Battle of Charlestown	(United States)	18 Oct	
1863	American Civil War	Battle of Buckland Mills	(United States)	19 Oct	Union cavalry caught in ambush, defeated
1863	January Uprising	Battle of Rybnica	(Poland)	20 Oct	Poles defeat Cossacks
1863	American Civil War	Battle of Pine Bluff	(United States)	25 Oct	Confederate attack fails
1863	American Civil War	Battle of Wauhatchie	(United States)	28–29 Oct	Longstreet defeated by Union forces
1863	American Civil War	Second Battle of Collierville	(United States)	3 Nov	Abortive Confederate attack on the town
1863	American Civil War	Battle of Droop Mountain	(United States)	6 Nov	
1863	American Civil War	Second Battle of Rappahannock Station	(United States)	7 Nov	Union forces surge across river, forcing Lee to retreat
1863	American Civil War	Battle of Campbell's Station	(United States)	16 Nov	Confederate double-envelopment attempt fails
1863	American Civil War	Battle of Mustang Island	(United States)	17 Nov	
1863	New Zealand Wars	Battle of Rangiriri	(New Zealand)	20–21 Nov	
1863	American Civil War	Third Battle of Chattanooga	(United States)	23–25 Nov	Grant defeats Bragg and relieves Union forces besieged in Chattanooga
1863	January Uprising	First Battle of Opatów	(Poland)	25 Nov	Poles capture town
1863	American Civil War	Battle of Ringgold Gap	(United States)	27 Nov	Confederates under Cleburne defeat Union forces under Hooker
1863	American Civil War	Battle of Fort Sanders	(United States)	29 Nov	Longstreet unable to take fort due to poor quality gunpowder
1863	American Civil War	Battle of Mine Run	(United States)	27 Nov – 2 Dec	Meade bombards Lee's Confederates but then withdraws
1863	American Civil War	Battle of Bean's Station	(United States)	14 Dec	Union forces withdraw a short distance
1863	American Civil War	Battle of Mossy Creek	(United States)	29 Dec	Confederate cavalry forced back
1864	Navajo Wars	Battle of Pecos River	(United States)	4 Jan	United States and Mescalero defeat Navajo
1864	American Civil War	Battle of Loudoun Heights	(United States)	10 Jan	Union defeats the Confederates
1864	Navajo Wars and American Indian Wars	Battle of Canyon de Chelly	(United States)	12–14 Jan	United States defeat Navajo
1864	American Civil War	Battle of Dandridge	(United States)	17 Jan	Union forces withdraw
1864	January Uprising	Battle of Iłża	(Poland)	17 Jan	Polish victory over Russia
1864	American Civil War	Battle of Athens	(United States)	26 Jan	Union victory
1864	American Civil War	Battle of Fair Garden	(United States)	27 Jan	Union Pyrrhic victory
1864	Second War of Schleswig	Battle of Sankelmark	(Germany)	6 Feb	Battle between Austria and Denmark. Tactical victory for Austria and strategic victory for Denmark.
1864	American Civil War	Battle of Morton's Ford	(United States)	6–7 Feb	Diversionary Union attack
1864	American Civil War	Battle of Middle Boggy Depot	(United States)	13 Feb	Union defeats Confederates
1864	American Civil War	Battle of Meridian	(United States)	14 Feb	US commander Sherman occupies town
1864	American Civil War	Battle of Olustee	(United States)	20 Feb	Union fail to take Florida
1864	January Uprising	Second Battle of Opatów	(Poland)	21 Feb	End of January Uprising. Russia defeats Polish rebels.
1864	American Civil War	Battle of Walkerton	(United States)	2 March	Confederates defeat Union
1864	Second War of Schleswig	Battle of Jasmund	(Germany)	17 March	Danish navy defeats Prussia
1864	American Civil War	Battle of Laredo	(United States)	18 March	Confederates defeat Union
1864	American Civil War	Battle of Paducah	(United States)	25 March	Confederate raid by Forrest successful
1864	American Civil War	Battle of Elkin's Ferry	(United States)	3–4 April	Confederates unable to prevent Union river crossing
1864	Apache Wars and American Civil War	Battle of Mount Gray	(United States)	7 April	United States defeat Apache
1864	American Civil War	Battle of Mansfield	(United States)	8 April	Banks' Red River campaign halted by rebels. Confederates defeat Union.
1864	American Civil War	Battle of Pleasant Hill	(United States)	9 April	Confederate attack fails
1864	American Civil War	Battle of Fort Pillow	(United States)	12 April	Confederate commander Forrest takes fort, massacres Black troops
1864	American Civil War	Battle of Prairie D'Ane	(United States)	9–13 April	US Commander Steele defeats Price
1864	American Civil War	Battle of Poison Spring	(United States)	18 April	Part of Red River campaign, Black troops massacred by Confederates
1864	Second Schleswig War	Battle of Dybbøl	(Denmark)	18 April	Key defeat for Denmark against Prussia
1864	American Civil War	Battle of Monett's Ferry	(United States)	23 April	Confederate forces driven back
1864	American Civil War	Battle of Marks' Mills	(United States)	25 April	Confederates defeat Union
1864	American Civil War	Battle of Jenkins' Ferry	(United States)	30 April	Union defeats Confederates
1864	American Civil War	Battle of the Wilderness	(United States)	5 May	US commander Grant and Confederate commander Lee meet inconclusively
1864	American Civil War	Battle of Albemarle Sound	(United States)	5 May	Indecisive naval battle between Union and Confederates
1864	American Civil War	Battle of Port Walthall Junction	(United States)	6–7 May	Union forces destroy railroad
1864	Second Schleswig War	Battle of Heligoland	(Germany)	9 May	Danish sea victory over Austria. Last significant battle involving wooden ships on both sides.
1864	American Civil War	Battle of Cloyd's Mountain	(United States)	9 May	Union victory, Confederate General Jenkins killed
1864	American Civil War	Battle of Swift Creek	(United States)	9 May	Union forces damage railroad but are stopped by Confederate forces
1864	American Civil War	Battle of Cove Mountain	(United States)	10 May	Union victory after brief battle
1864	American Civil War	Battle of Chester Station	(United States)	10 May	Union forces under Butler pushed back
1864	American Civil War	Battle of Yellow Tavern	(United States)	11 May	Union forces win cavalry battle, Stuart is killed
1864	American Civil War	Battle of Rocky Face Ridge	(United States)	8–13 May	Indecisive battle between Union and Confederates
1864	American Civil War	Battle of Resaca	(United States)	13 May	US commander Sherman defeats Johnston
1864	Dominican Restoration War	Battle of Monte Cristi	(Dominican Republic)	15 May	Spain defeats the Dominican Republic.
1864	American Civil War	Battle of New Market	(United States)	15 May	Confederate forces halt Union army under Sigel from advance up Shenandoah Valley
1864	American Civil War	Battle of Proctor's Creek	(United States)	12–16 May	Confederate commander Beauregard defeats Butler
1864	American Civil War	Battle of Adairsville	(United States)	17 May	Failed Confederate attempt to destroy part of the Union force approaching Atlanta
1864	American Civil War	Battle of Yellow Bayou	(United States)	18 May	Final battle of the Red River campaign in Louisiana, Union forces successfully cross the Atchafalaya River
1864	American Civil War	Battle of Ware Bottom Church	(United States)	20 May	Beauregard boxes Butler in
1864	American Civil War	Battle of Spotsylvania Court House	(United States)	8–21 May	US commander Grant and Lee meet inconclusively
1864	American Civil War	Battle of Wilson's Wharf	(United States)	24 May	Confederates under Fitzhugh Lee defeated by two Union Black Regiments
1864	American Civil War	Battle of North Anna	(United States)	23–26 May	Confederate commander Lee outmaneuvers Grant, but because of illness, is unable to capitalize
1864	American Civil War	Battle of New Hope Church	(United States)	25–26 May	US commander Hooker's forces defeated
1864	American Civil War	Battle of Pickett's Mill	(United States)	27 May	Unsuccessful attack by US commander Sherman on Johnston
1864	American Civil War	Battle of Haw's Shop	(United States)	28 May	Union advance halted
1864	American Civil War	Battle of Dallas	(United States)	28 May	Confederate withdrawal in Georgia
1864	American Civil War	Battle of Totopotomoy Creek	(United States)	28–30 May	Union forces pushed back
1864	American Civil War	Battle of Old Church	(United States)	30 May	Union forces drive Confederates back
1864	American Civil War	Battle of Piedmont	(United States)	5 June	Union forces under Hunter defeat Confederate defenses
1864	American Civil War	First Battle of Petersburg	(United States)	9 June	Confederate commander Beauregard defeats Butler
1864	American Civil War	Battle of Brices Crossroads	(United States)	10 June	Forrest routs Union force almost three times as large
1864	American Civil War	Battle of Cold Harbor	(United States)	31 May – 12 June	Lee repulses Grant
1864	American Civil War	Battle of Trevilian Station	(United States)	11–12 June	Confederate victory, Custer nearly surrounded and has to be rescued by Sheridan
1864	American Civil War	Battle of Lynchburg	(United States)	17 June	Confederates defeat Union
1864	American Civil War	Sinking of CSS Alabama	(United States)	19 June	USS Kearsarge sinks CSS Alabama
1864	American Civil War	Battle of Kolb's Farm	(United States)	22 June	Confederate attack fails due to poor terrain conditions
1864	American Civil War	Battle of Jerusalem Plank Road	(United States)	21–24 June	Union siege lines extended for Siege of Petersburg
1864	American Civil War	Battle of Saint Mary's Church	(United States)	24 June	Union forces fight a successful delaying action
1864	American Civil War	Battle of Kennesaw Mountain	(United States)	27 June	Confederate commander Johnston repulses Sherman
1864	Second War of Schleswig	Battle of Als	(Denmark)	29 June	Final battle of the war, Prussian victory over Denmark
1864	American Civil War	Battle of Marietta	(United States)	9 June – 3 July	Sherman defeats Johnston
1864	American Civil War	Battle of Monocacy Junction	(United States)	9 July	Union General Wallace slows up Early, saving Washington, DC
1864	American Civil War	Battle of Fort Stevens	(United States)	11–12 July	Failed Confederate attempt to capture Washington, DC
1864	American Civil War	Battle of Tupelo	(United States)	14–15 July	Union victory, Forrest wounded
1864	American Civil War	Second Battle of Petersburg	(United States)	15 June – 18 July	Lee repulses Grant at back door to Richmond
1864	American Civil War	Battle of Cool Spring	(United States)	17–18 July	Confederates defeat Union
1864	American Civil War	Battle of Rutherford's Farm	(United States)	20 July	Confederate under Early caught by surprise and defeated
1864	American Civil War	Battle of Peachtree Creek	(United States)	20 July	Confederate attack fails
1864	American Civil War	Battle of Atlanta	(United States)	22 July	US commander Sherman turns back Hood
1864	American Civil War	Second Battle of Kernstown	(United States)	24 July	Early defeats Union forces
1864	Sioux Wars and American Civil War	Battle of Killdeer Mountain	(United States)	26 July	Union forces defeat Sioux
1864	American Civil War	Battle of Ezra Church	(United States)	28 July	Confederates fail to gain element of surprise, finding entrenched Union forces. Union victory.
1864	American Civil War	Battle of the Crater	(United States)	30 July	Confederate commander Lee defeats Burnside
1864	American Civil War	Battle of Folck's Mill	(United States)	1 Aug	Indecisive battle between Union and Confederates
1864	American Civil War	Battle of Utoy Creek	(United States)	5–7 Aug	Indecisive battle on Union right flank
1864	American Civil War	Second Battle of Dalton	(United States)	14–15 Aug	Union forces withstand attack until relieved
1864	American Civil War	Battle of Gainesville	(United States)	17 Aug	Confederates defeat Union
1864	American Civil War	Battle of Lovejoy's Station	(United States)	20 Aug	Confederates repel Union raiders attacking the station.
1864	American Civil War	Battle of Globe Tavern	(United States)	18–21 Aug	Confederate forces lose control of railroads at Petersburg
1864	American Civil War	Second Battle of Memphis	(United States)	21 Aug	Partially successful Confederate raid
1864	American Civil War	Battle of Mobile Bay	(United States)	23 Aug	US navy under Farragut takes port
1864	American Civil War	Second Battle of Ream's Station	(United States)	25 Aug	Union lines overrun by Confederates
1864	American Civil War	Battle of Jonesborough	(United States)	31 Aug – 1 Sep	Hardee's Confederates defeated, resulting in Atlanta's fall
1864	Chōshū Rebellion	Battle of Shimonoseki	(Japan)	5-6 Sep	Engagements since July 1863 pits the UK, France, The Netherlands and the USA against Japanese warlord of the Chōshū Domain
1864	American Civil War	Third Battle of Winchester	(United States)	19 Sep	US commander Sheridan defeats Early, several officers killed or wounded on both sides
1864	American Civil War	Battle of Fisher's Hill	(United States)	21–22 Sep	Successful Union frontal assault
1864	American Civil War	Battle of Fort Davidson	(United States)	27 Sep	Union forces detonate their own fort after losing to Confederates
1864	American Civil War	Battle of Marianna	(United States)	27 Sep	Union defeats Confederates
1864	American Civil War	Battle of Chaffin's Farm	(United States)	29–30 Sep	Union forces victorious but fail to capture several forts
1864	American Civil War	Battle of Peebles' Farm	(United States)	30 Sep – 2 Oct	Union victory near Petersburg
1864	American Civil War	Battle of Saltville	(United States)	1–3 Oct	Confederates defeat Union Black Regiment, war crimes committed against captured soldiers
1864	American Civil War	Battle of Allatoona	(United States)	5 Oct	Union fortifications hold
1864	American Civil War	Battle of Darbytown Road	(United States)	7 Oct	Confederate attack repelled
1864	American Civil War	Battle of Tom's Brook	(United States)	9 Oct	Union cavalry defeats Confederates
1864	American Civil War	Capture of Sedalia	(United States)	15 Oct	Confederate cavalry defeats Union militia
1864	American Civil War	Battle of Glasgow, Missouri	(United States)	15 Oct	Union forces surrender
1864	American Civil War	Second Battle of Lexington	(United States)	19 Oct	Union forces driven out
1864	American Civil War	Battle of Cedar Creek	(United States)	19 Oct	US commander Sheridan defeats Early
1864	American Civil War	Battle of Little Blue River	(United States)	21 Oct	Confederate victory
1864	American Civil War	Second Battle of Independence	(United States)	22 Oct	Union forces occupy town
1864	American Civil War	Battle of Byram's Ford	(United States)	22–23 Oct	Confederates under Marmaduke defeated
1864	American Civil War	Battle of Westport	(United States)	23 Oct	Union forces win decisive battle to take control of Missouri
1864	American Civil War	Battle of Marais des Cygnes	(United States)	25 Oct	Price's Confederates pursued into Kansas
1864	American Civil War	Battle of Mine Creek	(United States)	25 Oct	Price's army crushed
1864	American Civil War	Battle of Marmiton River	(United States)	25 Oct	Price escapes Union pursuit
1864	American Civil War	Battle of Boydton Plank Road	(United States)	27–28 Oct	Union forces take control of road, but withdraw after battle
1864	American Civil War	Battle of Ladiga	(United States)	28 Oct	Confederates under Ferguson turn back Sherman's cavalry
1864	American Civil War	Second Battle of Newtonia	(United States)	28 Oct	US commander James G. Blunt defeats Joseph O. Shelby
1864	American Civil War	Battle of Decatur	(United States)	26–29 Oct	Confederates unable to cross river
1864	American Civil War	Battle of Johnsonville	(United States)	4–5 Nov	Confederates bombard Union forces during the night after a fire starts near Union positions
1864	American Civil War	Battle of Bull's Gap	(United States)	11–13 Nov	Minor Confederate victory
1864	American Civil War	Sherman's March to the Sea	(United States)	16 Nov	US commander Sherman lays waste to South
1864	American Civil War	Battle of Columbia	(United States)	24 Nov	Confederates divert attention
1864	American Indian Wars and Apache Wars	First Battle of Adobe Walls	25 Nov	US commander Carson fights Kiowa forces to a draw, but manages to destroy their settlement	
1864	Uruguayan War	Siege of Salto	(Uruguay)	22-28 Nov	Brazilian forces, supported by the Colorado Party, capture the city of Salto from Uruguay.
1864	American Civil War	Battle of Spring Hill	(United States)	29 Nov	Confederate mistakes allow Union forces to redeploy, leading to the Battle of Franklin
1864	Colorado War, American Indian Wars and American Civil War	Battle of Sand Creek	(United States)	29 Nov	US forces massacre Cheyenne and Arapaho people
1864	American Civil War	Battle of Franklin	(United States)	30 Nov	Confederate commander Hood attacks Thomas but loses
1864	Dominican Restoration War	Battle of La Canela	(Dominican Republic)	4 Dec	The Dominican Republic defeats Spain
1864	American Civil War	Battle of Waynesboro, Georgia	(United States)	4 Dec	US commander Kilpatrick stops Wheeler from attacking Sherman
1864	American Civil War	Third Battle of Murfreesboro	(United States)	5–7 Dec	Confederate raid mostly unsuccessful
1864	American Civil War	Battle of Nashville	(United States)	15–16 Dec	Confederate Army in Tennessee overwhelmed.
1864	American Civil War	Battle of Altamaha Bridge	(United States)	19 Dec	Confederates defeat Union
1864	American Civil War	First Battle of Fort Fisher	(United States)	7–27 Dec	Failed Union attempt to take fort
1865	Uruguayan War	Siege of Paysandú	(Uruguay)	3 Dec-2 Jan 1865	Brazilian-Colorado victory
1865	Colorado War	Battle of Julesburg	(United States)	7 Jan	
1865	American Civil War	Battle of Dove Creek	(United States)	8 Jan	
1865	American Civil War	Second Battle of Fort Fisher	(United States)	15 Jan	Union takes fort
1865	American Civil War	Battle of Trent's Reach	(United States)	23–25 Jan	
1865	Uruguayan War	Battle of Jaguarão	(Brazil)	27 Jan	Brazilian victory
1865	American Civil War	Battle of Rivers' Bridge	(United States)	3 Feb	Union forces capture river crossing
1865	American Civil War	Battle of Hatcher's Run	(United States)	5 Feb	Union force launch unexpected attack
1865	Colorado War	Battle of Rush Creek	(United States)	8–9 Feb	
1865	Apache Wars and American Civil War	Battle of Fort Buchanan	(United States)	17 Feb	
1865	American Civil War	Battle of Fort Myers	(United States)	20 Feb	
1865	American Civil War	Battle of Wilmington	(United States)	22 Feb	Last rebel port falls
1865	American Civil War	Battle of Waynesboro, Virginia	(United States)	2 March	Early's army destroyed
1865	American Civil War	Battle of Natural Bridge	(United States)	6 March	Confederate victory in Florida prevents the capture of Tallahassee
1865	American Civil War	Battle of Wyse Fork	(United States)	7–10 March	Confederate attacks repelled by Union artillery
1865	Indian Wars and Snake War	Battle of Mud Lake	(United States)	14 March	
1865	American Civil War	Battle of Averasborough	(United States)	16 March	Union and Confederate forces attack one another in turn, both attacks fail
1865	American Civil War	Battle of Bentonville	(United States)	19–21 March	Sherman defeats Confederates
1865	American Civil War	Battle of Fort Stedman	(United States)	25 March	Lee breaks siege
1865	American Civil War	Battle of Lewis's Farm	(United States)	29 March	Union forces capture Confederate earthworks.
1865	American Civil War	Battle of White Oak Road	(United States)	31 March	Confederate forces under Anderson defeated.
1865	American Civil War	Battle of Dinwiddie Court House	(United States)	31 March	Pickett defeats Sheridan
1865	American Civil War	Battle of Five Forks	(United States)	1 April	Sheridan routs Confederates in last important battle of the Civil War
1865	American Civil War	Battle of Selma	(United States)	2 April	Wilson defeats Forrest
1865	American Civil War	Third Battle of Petersburg	(United States)	2 April	Grant defeats Lee
1865	American Civil War	Battle of Sutherland's Station	(United States)	2 April	Lee's supply lines are cut
1865	American Civil War	Battle of Namozine Church	(United States)	3 April	Several Confederates captured
1865	American Civil War	Battle of Sayler's Creek	(United States)	6 April	Union victory, Lee realizes his army will not last long
1865	American Civil War	Battle of High Bridge	(United States)	6–7 April	Union forces thwart Lee's attempts to burn bridges and to resupply, Grant proposes that Lee surrender, but he refuses
1865	American Civil War	Battle of Cumberland Church	(United States)	7 April	Union forces attack Confederate rearguard, but darkness cuts the attack short
1865	American Civil War	Battle of Spanish Fort	(United States)	27 March – 8 April	Union forces capture fort just east of Mobile
1865	American Civil War	Battle of Appomattox Station	(United States)	8 April	Union forces thwart Lee's final attempt to resupply
1865	American Civil War	Battle of Fort Blakeley	(United States)	2–9 April	Union forces capture fort outside of Mobile
1865	American Civil War	Battle of Appomattox Courthouse	(United States)	9 April	Lee's forces surrounded. He subsequently surrenders.
1865	Second French intervention in Mexico	Battle of Tacámbaro	(Mexico)	11 April	
1865	American Civil War	Battle of Morrisville	(United States)	13–15 April	Last cavalry battle of the Civil War
1865	American Civil War	Battle of West Point	(United States)	16 April	Union victory
1865	American Civil War	Battle of Columbus	(United States)	16 April	Union victory
1865	American Civil War	Wilson's Raid	(United States)	22 March – 20 April	Union cavalry operate through Alabama and Georgia, opposed by Forest
1865	American Civil War	Battle of Palmito Ranch	(United States)	12–13 May	Confederate victory in Texas
1865	Paraguayan War	Battle of Riachuelo	(Argentina)	11 June	Brazil defeats Paraguay
1865	Second French intervention in Mexico	Battle of la Loma	(Mexico)	16 July	
1865	Colorado War, Sioux Wars and American Indian Wars	Battle of Platte Bridge	(United States)	26 July	
1865	Paraguayan War	Battle of Paso de Cuevas	(Argentina)	12 Aug	
1865	Powder River Expedition and Sioux Wars	Battle of Bone Pile Creek	(United States)	13–15 Aug	
1865	Paraguayan War	Battle of Jataí	(Argentina)	17 Aug	The combined army of the Triple Alliance (Brazil, Argentina and Uruguay) attacks a Paraguayan column of troops
1865	Indian Wars	Battle of the Tongue River	(United States)	29 Aug	US forces led by Connor defeat Arapaho forces
1865	Chincha Islands War	Battle of Papudo	(Chile)	26 Nov	Peru and Chile defeat Spain in a naval battle

== 1866–1870 ==
Year	War	Battle	Loc.	Date(s)	Description
1866	Chincha Islands War	Battle of Abtao	(Chile)	7 Feb	Indecisive battle between combined Peruvian-Chilean fleet and Spanish fleet
1866	Chincha Islands War	Battle of Callao	(Peru)	2 May	Spain defeats Peruvian forces
1866	Paraguayan War	Battle of Tuyutí	(Paraguay)	24 May	The combined army of the Triple Alliance (Brazil, Argentina and Uruguay) is attacked by Paraguayan Army. Almost 60,000 took part in the fight. 16,000 casualties (8,000 allied; 12,000 Paraguayans). Allied victory.
1866	Fenian Raids	Battle of Ridgeway	(Canada)	2 June	Fenian Brotherhood defeats Canadians
1866	Fenian Raids	Battle of Fort Erie	(Canada)	2 June	Canadian force overwhelmed by main Fenian army
1866	Third Italian War of Independence	Battle of Custoza	(Italy)	24 June	Austria defeats Italy.
1866	Austro-Prussian War	Battle of Langensalza	(Germany)	27 June	Hanoverian Army under King George V defeated by Prussians under General Von Flies
1866	Austro-Prussian War	Battle of Burkersdorf	(Czech Republic)	28 June	Prussia defeats Austria.
1866	Austro-Prussian War	Battle of Skalitz	(Czech Republic)	28 June	Prussia defeats Austria.
1866	Austro-Prussian War	Battle of Königgrätz	(Czech Republic)	3 July	Prussia, led by General Von Moltke, defeats Austria in Austro-Prussian War, resulting in Prussia taking over as prominent German nation from Austria
1866	Third Italian War of Independence	Battle of Lissa	(Croatia)	20 July	Austrian Admiral Von Tegetthoff rams and drives off Italian fleet under Persano. First clash of ironclads.
1866	Third Italian War of Independence	Battle of Bezzecca	(Italy)	21 July	Garibaldi defeats Austrians
1866	Austro-Prussian War	Battle of Tauberbischofsheim	(Germany)	24 July	Prussia defeats Württemberg, Baden, Hesse-Darmstadt, Austria and Nassau.
1866	Paraguayan War	Battle of Curuzú	(Paraguay)	1–3 Sep	Brazil and Argentina defeat Paraguay.
1866	Paraguayan War	Battle of Curupaity	(Paraguay)	22 Sep	Argentine and Brazilian forces of 20,000 men attack Paraguayan trenches. Paraguayan victory.
1866	Second French intervention in Mexico	Battle of Miahuatlán	(Mexico)	3 Oct	Mexican Republicans defeat the Mexican empire.
1866	Second French intervention in Mexico	Battle of La Carbonera	(Mexico)	18 Oct	Mexican Republicans defeat the Mexican Empire.
1866	Red Cloud's War and Sioux Wars	Fetterman Fight	(United States)	21 Dec	80 men under US captain William J. Fetterman are completely wiped out at the hands of at least 1,000 Lakota, Cheyenne, and Arapaho warriors under Oglala Lakota chiefs Red Cloud and Crazy Horse.
1866	Indian Wars and Snake War	Battle of Owyhee River	(United States)	26 Dec	The US defeat the Northern Paiute people.
1867	Indian Wars and Snake War	Battle of Steen's Mountain	(United States)	29 Jan	
1867	-	Battle of Kansala	(Guinea-Bissau)	13 – 27 May	Forces of the Kaabu Empire fight those of the Imamate of Futa Jallon. Kaabu defenders blow up Kansala once defeat is clear, taking many attackers with it.
1867	-	Battle of Fandane-Thiouthioune	(Senegal)	18 July	The Serer people defeated the Muslim jihadists of Senegambia
1867	Indian Wars and Snake War	Battle of Infernal Caverns	(United States)	26–28 Sep	
1867	Paraguayan War	Battle of Potrero Obella	(Paraguay)	28 Oct	
1868	Boshin War	Battle of Awa	(Japan)	28 Jan	The Tokugawa shogunate defeats the Imperial Court in Kyoto and the Satsuma Domain.
1868	Boshin War	Battle of Hokuetsu	(Japan)	29 March	The Imperial Court in Kyoto defeats the Tokugawa shogunate.
1868	Boshin War	Battle of Kōshū-Katsunuma	(Japan)	29 March	The Imperial Court in Kyoto defeats the Tokugawa shogunate.
1868	1868 Expedition to Abyssinia	Battle of Magdala	(Ethiopia)	9–13 April	British commander Napier defeats the army of Emperor Tewodros II of Ethiopia and captures Magdala by assault. Tewodros dies by suicide.
1868	Boshin War	Battle of Utsunomiya Castle	(Japan)	10–14 May	The Imperial Court in Kyoto defeats the Tokugawa shogunate.
1868	Russian conquest of Bukhara	Siege of Samarkand (1868)	(Uzbekistan)	14–20 June	Russian victory.
1868	Boshin War	Battle of Ueno	(Japan)	4 July	Imperial Court in Kyoto defeats the Tokugawa shogunate.
1868	Paraguayan War	Battle of Piribebuy	(Paraguay)	12 Aug	Brazil defeats Paraguay.
1868	Comanche War and American Indian Wars	Battle of Beecher Island	(United States)	17–19 Sep	The USA defeats the Arapaho, the Cheyenne and the Lakota people.
1868	Boshin War	Battle of Bonari Pass	(Japan)	6 Oct	The Imperial Court in Kyoto defeats the Tokugawa shogunate.
1868	Ten Years' War	Battle of Pino de Baire	(Cuba)	25 Oct	Cuban rebels defeat Spain
1868	Boshin War	Battle of Noheji	(Japan)	7 Nov	The Imperial Court in Kyoto defeats the Ōuetsu Reppan Dōmei, Morioka Domain and the Hachinohe Domain.
1868	Indian Wars	Battle of Washita River	(United States)	27 Nov	US commander Custer defeats Black Kettle of the Cheyenne.
1868	Ten Years' War	Battle of Bonilla	(Cuba)	28 Nov	Cuban rebels defeat Spain.
1868	Paraguayan War	Battle of Itororó	(Paraguay)	6 Dec	First battle of a series fought the month of December between the Brazilian Army and the Paraguayan Army. Around 13,000 Brazilians attack a fortified position on a river bridge defended by 5,000 Paraguayans.
1868	Paraguayan War	Battle of Avahy	(Paraguay)	11 Dec	17,000 Allied troops, mainly Brazilians, attack 4,000 Paraguayans
1868	Paraguayan War	Battle of Lomas Valentinas	(Paraguay)	21–27 Dec	Fought in two days between the Triple Alliance Army (Brazil, Argentina and Uruguay) against Paraguayan forces (19,500 allies on the first day; 25,000 on the second/ 6,500 Paraguayans)
1869	Ten Years' War	Battle of El Salado	(Cuba)	7 Jan	Cuban rebels defeat Spain.
1869	Ten Years' War	Battle of Las Tunas	(Cuba)	16 Aug	Cuban rebels defeat Spain.
1870	Paraguayan War	Battle of Cerro Corá	(Paraguay)	1 March	Brazil defeats Paraguay.
1870	Fenian Raids	Battle of Eccles Hill	(Canada)	25 May	Canadians defeat Fenian Brotherhood
1870	Franco-Prussian War	Battle of Wissembourg	(France)	4 Aug	German victory
1870	Franco-Prussian War	Battle of Spicheren	(France)	6 Aug	Von Steinmetz leads Prussians to victory over the French
1870	Franco-Prussian War	Battle of Wörth	(France)	6 Aug	German Crown Prince defeats French forces
1870	Franco-Prussian War	Battle of Mars-La-Tour	(France)	16 Aug	German strategic victory against French
1870	Franco-Prussian War	Battle of Gravelotte	(France)	18 Aug	German victory against French
1870	Franco-Prussian War	Battle of Sedan	(France)	1 Sep	Mac-Mahon's French lose to Germans, paving the way to the founding of the German Empire
1870	Franco-Prussian War	Siege of Strasbourg	(France)	14 Aug - 28 Sep	Germans capture city
1870	Franco-Prussian War	Battle of Le Bourget	(France)	27–30 Sep	Albert, King of Saxony defeats French forces
1870	Franco-Prussian War	Battle of Chevilly	(France)	30 Sep	French attack on Prussian forces repulsed
1870	Franco-Prussian War	Siege of Metz	(France)	19 Aug – 27 Oct	Bazaine forced to surrender.
1870	Franco-Prussian War	Siege of Belfort	(France)	3 Nov 1870 - 18 Feb 1871	German victory
1870	Franco-Prussian War	Battle of Coulmiers	(France)	9 Nov	French Army, under General Paladines, defeat a Bavarian army. Liberation of Orléans.
1870	Franco-Prussian War	Battle of Villiers	(France)	29 Nov – 3 Dec	Germans defeat French

== 1871-1875 ==
Year	War	Battle	Loc.	Date(s)	Description
1871	Franco-Prussian War	Battle of the Lisaine	(France)	15–17 Jan	French efforts to lift the Siege of Belfort fail
1871	Franco-Prussian War	Battle of St. Quentin	(France)	19 Jan	Prussians defeat French
1871	Franco-Prussian War	Battle of Buzenval	(France)	20 Jan	German Crown Prince defeats the French
1871	Mokrani Revolt	Battle of the Col des Beni Aïcha	(Algeria)	19 April-8 May	French victory.
1871	Mokrani Revolt	Battle of Alma (Algeria)	(Algeria)	19–22 April	French victory
1871	Mokrani Revolt	Capture of Palestro	(Algeria)	20–22 April	Algerian victory.
1871	Ottoman–Wahhabi War	Al-Hasa Expedition	(Saudi Arabia)	20 April-3 June	Ottoman Empire captures Al-Ahsa Governorate
1871	-	Battle of Adwa	(Ethiopia)	11 July	Fought between Emperor Tekle Giyorgis II and Kassa Mercha. Kassa Mercha decisively defeats an army of some 60,000 under Tekle Giyorgis with 12,000 of his own troops, securing his path to become Emperor of Ethiopia.
1873	Modoc War and Indian Wars	First Battle of the Stronghold	(United States)	17 Jan	The Modoc people defeat the USA.
1873	Yavapai War and Apache Wars	Battle of Turret Peak	(United States)	27 March	The USA defeats the Yavapai and the Apache.
1873	Aceh War	First Aceh Expedition	(Indonesia)	26 March – 25 April	An expedition under Dutch Major General Köhler with the intention of attacking and taking the Sultan's palace of Aceh.
1873	Yellowstone Expedition of 1873	Battle of Honsinger Bluff	(United States)	4 Aug	Inconclusive battle between the Lakota people and the USA.
1873	Cantonal Rebellion	Battle of Chinchilla	(Spain)	10 Aug	Spain defeats the Canton of Cartagena.
1873	Yellowstone Expedition of 1873	Battle of Pease Bottom	(United States)	11 Aug	The USA defeats the Lakota people.
1873	Cantonal Rebellion	Battle of Orihuela	(Spain)	30 Aug	The Canton of Cartagena defeats Spain.
1873	Cantonal Rebellion	Battle of Portmán	(Spain)	11 Oct	A Spanish fleet defeats the Canton of Cartagena.
1874	Ten Years' War	Battle of Las Guasimas	(Cuba)	16-20 Mar	Cuba defeats Spain.
1874	Third Carlist War	Action of San Pedro Abanto	(Spain)	25-28 Mar	Spanish Liberals defeat the Carlists.
1874	Red River War	Second Battle of Adobe Walls	(United States)	27 June – 28	US Hunters hold off 300 Comanche warriors
1874	Red River War and American Indian Wars	Battle of Palo Duro Canyon	(United States)	28 Sep	Comanche, Cheyenne, Arapaho and Kiowa defeated by US forces
1874	Yavapai War and Apache Wars	Battle of Sunset Pass	(United States)	1 Nov	The Apache defeat the USA.
1874	Aceh War	Second Aceh Expedition	(Indonesia)	Late 1873	Dutch Colonial forces take the sultan's palace in Aceh
1875	Third Carlist War	Battle of Lácar	(Spain)	3 Feb	Carlists defeat Spanish Liberals.
1875	Egyptian–Ethiopian War	Battle of Gundet	(Ethiopia)	16 Nov	A large force under Yohannes IV decisively defeat a much smaller force of Egyptians under the commanders Bey, Ahrendrup, and Count Zichy

== 1876-1880 ==
Year	War	Battle	Loc.	Date(s)	Description
1876	Ethiopian–Egyptian War	Battle of Gura	(Eritrea)	7–9 March	Emperor Yohannes IV decisively defeats an Egyptian punitive attack
1876	Great Sioux War of 1876	Battle of Powder River	(United States)	17 March	
1876	Great Sioux War of 1876	Battle of Prairie Dog Creek	(United States)	9 June	
1876	Great Sioux War of 1876	Battle of the Rosebud	(United States)	17 June	Sioux, Cheyenne and Arapahoe warriors under Crazy Horse, check US forces under Crook, forcing him to retreat into Wyoming and preventing him from uniting with Custer
1876	Great Sioux War of 1876	Battle of Little Big Horn	(United States)	25 June	Sitting Bull, Crazy Horse of Sioux defeat Custer
1876	Great Sioux War of 1876	Battle of Warbonnet Creek	(United States)	17 July	
1876	Montenegrin–Ottoman War and Herzegovina Uprising	Battle of Vučji Do	(Montenegro)	18 July	Montenegrin-Herzegovinian forces heavily defeat the Ottomans and manage to capture two of their commanders
1876	Montenegrin-Turkish War of 1876-1878	Battle of Fundina	(Montenegro)	2 Aug	Montenegro defeats much bigger Ottoman Army
1876	Serbian–Ottoman Wars	Battle of Šumatovac	(Serbia)	23 Aug	The outnumbered Serbian army, led by Colonel Protić, win a tactical victory in this defensive battle against the Ottoman forces
1876	Great Sioux War of 1876	Battle of Slim Buttes	(United States)	9-10 Sep	2000 US cavalry and infantry forces destroy a small village under Oglala chief American Horse, then repulse a relief attack of 500-600 Lakota under Crazy Horse
1876	Great Sioux War of 1876	Battle of Cedar Creek	(United States)	21 Oct	
1876	Great Sioux War of 1876	Dull Knife Fight	(United States)	25 Nov	US and Pawnee forces surprise and destroy the village of the last free Cheyennes, forcing them to seek shelter with Crazy Horse's people
1877	Buffalo Hunters' War and Apache Wars	Battle of Yellow House Canyon	(United States)	18 March	Comanche and Apache defeat the US.
1877	Satsuma Rebellion	Battle of Tabaruzaka	(Japan)	3–20 March	Japanese imperialists defeat the Satsuma Domain.
1877	Great Sioux War	Battle of Little Muddy Creek	(United States)	7–8 May	The US defeat the Miniconjou.
1877	Russo-Turkish War and the Romanian War of Independence	Action off Măcin	(Romania)	25-26 May	The Romanian and Russian navies defeat the Ottoman Empire.
1877	Russo-Turkish War	Battle of Kizil-Tepe	(Turkey)	25 June	Ottoman victory
1877	Nez Perce War	Battle of Cottonwood	(United States)	3–5 July	The Nez Perce defeat the US.
1877	Nez Perce War	Battle of the Clearwater	(United States)	10 July	Chief Joseph of the Nez Perce defeated by Howard of the US
1877	Russo-Turkish War	Battle of Nikopol	(Bulgaria)	16 July	Russian forces capture city
1877	Russo-Turkish War	First Battle of Shipka Pass	(Bulgaria)	17–19 July	Russian commander Gourko seizes pass from the Ottoman Empire under Suleiman Pasha
1877	Nez Perce War	Battle of the Big Hole	(United States)	9 Aug	Minor US victory over the Nez Perce, Gibbon wounded
1877	Nez Perce War	Battle of Camas Creek	(United States)	20 Aug	The Nez Perce defeat the US.
1877	Russo-Turkish War	Second Battle of Shipka Pass	(Bulgaria)	21–26 Aug	Ottomans unable to retake pass
1877	Russo-Turkish War	Battle of Lovcha	(Bulgaria)	1–3 Sep	Russian commander Skobelev defeats Ottoman commander Osman Pasha
1877	Nez Perce War	Battle of Canyon Creek	(United States)	13 Sep	The Nez Perce defeat the US.
1877	Russo-Turkish War	Third Battle of Shipka Pass	(Bulgaria)	13–17 Sep	Süleyman Pasha fails in a second Ottoman attempt to retake the pass
1877	Satsuma Rebellion	Battle of Shiroyama	(Japan)	24 Sep	Japanese imperialists defeat the Satsuma Domain.
1877	Nez Perce War	Battle of Bear Paw	(United States)	30 Sep – 5 Oct	US victory forces Chief Joseph to surrender
1877	Russo-Turkish War	Battle of Gorni-Dubnik	(Bulgaria)	24 Oct	Russian commander Gourko captures fortress
1877	Russo-Turkish War	Battle of Kars	(Turkey)	17 Nov	Russian forces capture city
1877	Russo-Turkish War	Siege of Plevna	(Bulgaria)	20 July – 10 Dec	Russians, after reverses, defeat Ottomans
1878	Russo-Turkish War	Fourth Battle of Shipka Pass	(Bulgaria)	5–9 Jan	Russians defeat Ottomans
1878	Russo-Turkish War	Battle of Philippopolis	(Bulgaria)	17 Jan	Ottomans forced to retreat to Constantinople
1878	Russo-Turkish War	Battle of Lëkurës	(Albania)	28 Feb – 4 Mar	Albanian irregulars defeat Greece
1878		Battle of Mouzaki	(Greece)	4 May	Greece defeats the Ottoman Empire
1878	Austro-Hungarian campaign in Bosnia and Herzegovina in 1878	Battle of Maglaj	(Bosnia and Herzegovina)	3-5- Aug	Austria-Hungary defeats the Ottoman Empire
1878	Second Anglo-Afghan War	Battle of Ali Masjid	(Pakistan)	21 Nov	British victory over Afghanistan
1878	Second Anglo-Afghan War	Battle of Peiwar Kotal	(Pakistan)	28–29 Nov	British victory over Afghanistan
1879	Anglo-Zulu War	Battle of Isandlwana	(South Africa)	22 Jan	Zulu combined army annihilates British-led force
1879	Anglo-Zulu War	Battle of Rorke's Drift	(South Africa)	22 Jan	A small, heavily outnumbered British force defeats the Zulus
1879	Anglo-Zulu War	Battle of Intombe	(South Africa)	12 March	Zulu army destroys small British force in an ambush
1879	War of the Pacific	Battle of Topáter	(Chile)	23 March	Chile defeats Bolivia
1879	Anglo-Zulu War	Battle of Hlobane	(South Africa)	28 March	British suffer yet another disaster at Zulu hands
1879	Anglo-Zulu War	Battle of Kambula	(South Africa)	29 March	Zulu Impi defeated in an attack on a British laager
1879	Anglo-Zulu War	Battle of Gingindlovu	(South Africa)	2 April	British defeat Zulu
1879	Anglo-Zulu War	Siege of Eshowe	(South Africa)	22 Jan - 3 April	British victory
1879	War of the Pacific	Battle of Chipana	(Chile)	12 April	Indecisive naval battle between Chile and Peru
1879	Second Anglo-Afghan War	Battle of Kam Dakka	(Afghanistan)	22 April	British victory
1879	War of the Pacific	Battle of Iquique	(Chile)	21 May	Indecisive battle between Chile and the combined forces of Peru and Bolivia
1879	Anglo-Zulu War	Battle of Ulundi	(South Africa)	4 July	Decisive British victory
1879	Second Anglo-Afghan War	First Battle of Charasiab	(Afghanistan)	6 Oct	British victory
1879	War of the Pacific	Naval Battle of Angamos	(Chile)	8 Oct	Chilean navy defeats the Peruvian and Bolivian navies
1879	War of the Pacific	Battle of Pisagua	(Chile)	2 Nov	Successful Chilean amphibious assault
1879	War of the Pacific	Battle of San Francisco	(Chile)	19 Nov	Peruvian and Bolivian troops ambush Chileans but Bolivians retreat, forcing Peruvians to follow suit
1879	War of the Pacific	Battle of Tarapacá	(Chile)	27 Nov	Peru defeats Chile
1879	Battles for Plav and Gusinje	Battle of Novšiće	(Montenegro)	4 Dec	Pro-Ottoman irregular troops of the League of Prizren ambush and repulse Montenegrin forces
1880	Battles for Plav and Gusinje	Battle of Murino	(Montenegro)	8 Jan	Around 10,000 pro-Ottoman forces attack and are repulsed by Montenegrins numbering 3,000
1880	Apache Wars and Victorio's War	Battle of Hembrillo Basin	(United States)	5–8 April	Apache defeat the USA
1880	Second Anglo-Afghan War	Battle of Ahmed Khel	(Pakistan)	19 April	British and Indian forces defeat Afghans
1880	Second Anglo-Afghan War	Second Battle of Charasiab	(Afghanistan)	25 April	Brits recapture Char Asiab
1880	Apache Wars and Victorio's War	Battle of Fort Tularosa	(United States)	14 May	The USA defeat the Apache
1880	War of the Pacific	Battle of Arica	(Chile)	2 July	Chile storms Peruvian positions atop a hill. Heavy casualties.
1880	Second Anglo-Afghan War	Battle of Maiwand	(Afghanistan)	27 July	Afghan victory over British and Indian forces
1880	Second Anglo-Afghan War	Battle of Kandahar	(Afghanistan)	1 Sep	British victory over Afghan forces, following General Roberts' Kabul-to-Kandahar relief march
1880	Apache Wars and Victorio's War	Battle of Carrizo Canyon	(United States)	12 Sep	The USA defeat the Apache
1880		Battle of Ulcinj	(Montenegro)	22 Nov	The Ottoman Empire defeats the Albanians
1880	First Boer War	Battle of Bronkhorstspruit	(South Africa)	20 Dec	Transvaal Boers defeat British

== 1881-1885 ==
Year	War	Battle	Loc.	Date(s)	Description
1881	First Boer War	Battle of Laing's Nek	(South Africa)	28 Jan	Boer victory, British gunfire holds Boers back long enough to allow retreat
1881	First Boer War	Battle of Schuinshoogte	(South Africa)	8 Feb	Boer victory
1881	First Boer War	Battle of Majuba Hill	(South Africa)	27 Feb	Boer victory over British, Colley killed
1881	Mahdist War	Battle of Aba	(Sudan)	12 Aug	
1881	Geronimo's War and Apache Wars	Battle of Cibecue Creek	(United States)	30 Aug	
1882	Menelik's Invasions	Battle of Embabo	(Ethiopia)	6 June	Shewan forces under Negus Menelik II defeat the opposing forces of Gojjam under Negus Tekle Haymanot, giving Shewa the hegemony over the Gibe region and making Menelik the most powerful ruler in Ethiopia except for Emperor Yohannes IV
1882	Anglo-Egyptian War	Bombardment of Alexandria	(Egypt)	11–13 July	
1882	Apache Wars	Battle of Big Dry Wash	(United States)	17 July	
1882	Anglo-Egyptian War	Battle of Kafr El Dawwar	(Egypt)	5 Aug	
1882	Anglo-Egyptian War	Battle of Tel al-Kebir	(Egypt)	13 Sep	British forces defeat Egyptian army under Colonel Urabi
1883	Tonkin Campaign	Battle of Cầu Giấy	(Vietnam)	19 May	Black Flag forces defeat French forces in Tonkin
1883	Mahdist War	Battle of El Obeid	(Sudan)	3-5 Nov	Mahdi wipes out Egyptians controlling Sudan
1883	Timok Rebellion	Battle of Vratarnica	(Serbia)	12 Nov	Serbian royalists defeat rebels of the National Militia.
1883	Aceh War	Continuing war	(Indonesia)		Major Van Heutsz conquers the rest of Aceh and becomes governor of the Dutch East Indies
1884	Mahdist War	Battles of El Teb	(Sudan)	4–29 Feb	Mahdi forces battle Egyptian then British forces
1884	Mahdist War	Battle of Tamai	(Sudan)	13 March	British forces under Graham defeat a Mahdi army under Digna despite successfully breaking an infantry square
1884	Sino-French War	Battle of Fuzhou	(China)	23 Aug	French fleet destroys Qing Chinese fleet at Fuzhou
1884	Sino-French War	Battle of Tamsui	(Taiwan)	2–8 Oct	Qing Chinese victory over the French
1884	Sino-French War	Battle of Yu Oc	(Vietnam)	19 Nov	French victory over Black Flag forces
1885	Sino-French War	Battle of Nui Bop	(Vietnam)	4 Jan	French victory over Qing Chinese forces
1885	Mahdist War	Siege of Khartoum	(Sudan)	26 Jan	After a 10-month siege, the Mahdi capture the city from the British, slaughtering the garrison, as well as 4,000 residents
1885	Sino-French War	Battle of Đồng Đăng	(Vietnam)	23 Feb	French victory over Qing Chinese forces
1885	Sino-French War	Battle of Hòa Mộc	(Vietnam)	2 March	French victory over Qing Chinese and Black Flag forces
1885	Sino-French War	Siege of Tuyên Quang	(Vietnam)	24 Nov 1884 – 3 March 1885	French victory over Qing Chinese and Black Flag forces
1885	Sino-French War	Battle of Bang Bo	(Vietnam)	23–24 March	Chinese victory over French forces
1885	Sino-French War	Battle of Phu Lam Tao	(Vietnam)	23 March	Qing Chinese and Black Flag victory over French forces
1885	North-West Rebellion	Battle of Duck Lake	(Canada)	26 March	Dumont wins a victory for the Métis people over Canada
1885	North-West Rebellion	Battle of Fort Pitt	(Canada)	2–15 April	Cree forces destroy Canadian fort
1885	North-West Rebellion	Battle of Fish Creek	(Canada)	24 April	Middleton withdraws the Canadian force
1885	North-West Rebellion	Battle of Cut Knife	(Canada)	2 May	Cree and Assiniboine defeat Canadian force
1885	North-West Rebellion	Battle of Batoche	(Canada)	5–12 May	The Canadian commander Middleton defeats Métis leader Dumont
1885	Geronimo's War and Apache Wars	Battle of Devil's Creek	(United States)	22 May	The USA defeats the Apache
1885	North-West Rebellion	Battle of Frenchman's Butte	(Canada)	28 May	Cree withstand Canadian assault
1885	North-West Rebellion	Battle of Loon Lake	(Canada)	3 June	Canadians defeat the Cree
1885	Mahdist War	Battle of Kufit	(Eritrea)	23 Sep	Ras Alula of Ethiopia defeats an invading Mahdi army led by Digna
1885	Serbo-Bulgarian War	Battle of Slivnitsa	(Bulgaria)	5–7 Nov (OS)	Bulgarians win the decisive engagement
1885	Serbo-Bulgarian War	Battle of Pirot	(Serbia)	14–15 Nov (OS)	Final battle of the Serbo-Bulgarian War. Bulgarian victory.
1885	Apache Wars	Battle of Little Dry Creek	(United States)	19 Dec	The Apache defeat the USA
1885	Mahdist War	Battle of Ginnis	(Sudan)	30 Dec	Anglo-Egyptian Army defeat Mahdist Sudanese warriors, effectively ending the First Sudan Campaign

== 1886-1890 ==
Year	War	Battle	Loc.	Date(s)	Description
1886	Menelik's Invasions	Battle of Azule	(Ethiopia)	6 Sep	Ras Darge Sahle Selassie defeats a force of Arsi Oromo
1886	Menelik's Invasions	Battle of Hirna	(Ethiopia)	Oct	Emirate of Harar troops led by Bakri Salih routs Abyssinian forces of Menelik II
1887	Menelik's Invasions	Battle of Chelenqo	(Ethiopia)	9 Jan	Negus Menelik II routs the tiny Harari army of emir 'Abd-Allah II, leading to the conquest of Harar
1887	Italo-Ethiopian War of 1887–1889	Battle of Dogali	(Eritrea)	26 Jan	Ras Alula annihilates an Italian battalion sent to relieve an Ethiopian siege of Sahati
1888	Mahdist War	Battle of Dufile	(Uganda)	Oct	Egypt defeats Mahdist state
1888	Samoan Civil War	First Battle of Vailele	(Samoa)	18 December	Samoans under Mataʻafa Iosefo defeat Germany .
1888	German occupation in east Africa	Abushiri revolt	(Tanzania)	1888-1890	Germany defeats Omani and Swahili rebels .
1888	Mahdist War	Battle of Suakin	(Sudan)	20 Dec	British defeated the Mahdi forces near Suakin
1889	Mahdist War	Battle of Gallabat	(Sudan)	9–10 March	On the brink of victory, Emperor Yohannes IV is killed and his army defeated
1890	First Franco-Dahomean War	Battle of Atchoukpa	(Benin)	20 April	French forces defeat the Dahomean army near Porto-Novo
1890	Ghost Dance War, American Indian Wars, and Sioux Wars	Battle of Wounded Knee	(United States)	29 Dec	Sioux crushed in last Major Indian Wars battle

== 1891-1895 ==
Year	War	Battle	Loc.	Date(s)	Description
1891	-	Battle of Mulayda	(Saudi Arabia)	24 Jan	Rashidi troops end the Second Saudi State
1891	Chilean Civil War of 1891	Battle of Pozo Almonte	(Chile)	6 March	
1891	Chilean Civil War of 1891	Battle of Concón	(Chile)	21 Aug	
1891	Chilean Civil War of 1891	Battle of Placilla	(Chile)	28 Aug	
1892	Mahdist War	Battle of Serobeti	(Eritrea)	26 Jun	Italy defeats the Mahdist State.
1893	Congo Arab war	Battle of Luama river	(Democratic Republic of the Congo)	20 Oct	the last major battle of the war. It was a tactical stalemate, but Sefu bin Hamid was killed and remaining resistance against Belgian forces soon disintegrated.
1893	First Matabele War	Battle of Bembesi	(Zimbabwe)	1 Nov	700 British troops defeat 10,000 Ndebele
1893	1888–1893 Hazara uprisings	Battle of Uruzgan	(Afghanistan)		Expulsion of Uruzgani Hazaras
1894	Mahdist War	Battle of Kassala	(Sudan)	17 Jul	Italy defeats the Mahdist State.
1894	First Sino-Japanese War	Battle of Yalu River	(China) / (North Korea)	17 Sep	Japanese fleet barely defeats Chinese
1895	First Italo–Ethiopian War	Battle of Coatit	(Eritrea)	13–14 Jan	After occupying Adwa, the Italians defeat a counterattack by Ras Mangesha Yohannes
1895	Japanese invasion of Taiwan	Battle of Keelung	(Taiwan)	2–3 June	
1895	Japanese invasion of Taiwan	Battle of Baguashan	(Taiwan)	27 Aug	
1895	Japanese invasion of Taiwan	Battle of Yunlin-Chiayi	(Taiwan)	1–2 Sep	
1895	Japanese invasion of Taiwan	Battle of Ciayi	(Taiwan)	9 Oct	
1895	Japanese invasion of Taiwan	Battle of Chiatung	(Taiwan)	11 Oct	
1895	Japanese invasion of Taiwan	Battle of Changhsing	(Taiwan)	26 Nov	
1895	First Italo-Ethiopian War	Battle of Amba Alagi	(Eritrea)	7 Dec	Ras Makonnen Woldemikael leads the first Ethiopian counterstrike of the war to success

== 1896-1900 ==
Year	War	Battle	Loc.	Date(s)	Description
1896	First Italo-Ethiopian War	Siege of Mek'ele	(Ethiopia)	6–21 Jan	Menelik II's forces besiege the Italians at Mek'ele until the defenders receive permission allowing them to leave the town
1896	First Italo-Ethiopian War	Battle of Adowa	(Ethiopia)	1 March	Ethiopian soldiers under Emperor Menelik II defeat upon Italian troops
1896	Philippine Revolution	Battle of Camalig	(Philippines)	2 April	The Philippine Revolutionary Army defeats Spain.
1896	Philippine Revolution	Battle of Tres de Abril	(Philippines)	3–8 April	Spain defeats the Katipunan.
1896	Philippine Revolution	Battle of Calamba	(Philippines)	May	The Philippine Revolutionary Army defeats Spain.
1896	Philippine Revolution	Battle of San Juan del Monte	(Philippines)	30 Aug	Spain defeats the Katipunan.
1896	Philippine Revolution	Battle of Novelta	(Philippines)	30 Aug	The Philippine Revolutionary Army defeats Spain.
1896	Philippine Revolution	Battle of San Francisco de Malabon	(Philippines)	31 Aug	The Katipunan defeat Spain.
1896	Philippine Revolution	Battle of Talisay	(Philippines)	12 Oct	The Philippine Revolutionary Army defeats Spain.
1896	Philippine Revolution	Battle of Batangas	(Philippines)	23 Oct	Spain defeats the Katipunan.
1896	Philippine Revolution	Battle of Binakayan-Dalahican	(Philippines)	9–11 Nov	The first major victory of the Philippine Revolutionary soldiers over Spanish colonial forces under Aguinaldo, Evangelista, Tirona and Montoya
1896	Philippine Revolution	Battle of Sambat	(Philippines)	15–16 Nov	Spain defeats the Katipunan.
1896	Indian wars	Yaqui Uprising	(Mexico) (United States)		Mexican–American victory, Uprising suppressed .
1896	-	Battle of Adibo	(Ghana)	3 or 4 December	Germany defeats the Kingdom of Dagbon.
1897	Philippine Revolution	Battle of Zapote Bridge	(Philippines)	17 Feb	Victory for the Philippine Revolutionary forces by Aguinaldo and Evangelista; captures Zapote Bridge in Bacoor and defeats the Spanish colonial forces under Polavieja.
1897	Philippine Revolution	Battle of Puray	(Philippines)	June 14, 1897	Spanish forces attack the Katipunan forces on Mt. Puray, commanded by Licerio Geronimo, Pio del Pilar, Hermogines Bautista, Mariano Salvador and Pablo Astilla.
1897	Greco-Turkish War	Battle of Dömeke	(Greece)	18 April - 20 May	Ottoman victory
1897	Tirah Campaign	Battle of Saragarhi	(Pakistan)	12 Sep	Battle between twenty-one Sikhs of the Sikh Regiment of British India, defending an army post, and 10,000 Afghans
1898	Mahdist War	Battle of Atbara	(Sudan)	8 April	British and Egyptians defeat Mahdist State.
1898	Spanish–American War	Battle of Manila Bay	(Philippines)	1 May	
1898	Spanish–American War	Battle of Cárdenas	(Cuba)	11 May	Spanish naval victory
1898	Spanish–American War	Battle of Cienfuegos	(Cuba)	11 May	US forces cut two telegraph cables but fail to destroy a third due to Spanish intervention
1898	Spanish–American War	Battle of San Juan	(Puerto Rico)	12 May	Indecisive battle
1898	Philippine Revolution	Battle of Alapan	(Philippines)	28 May	
1898	Spanish–American War	Invasion of Guantánamo Bay	(Cuba)	6–10 June	US commences its invasion of Cuba
1898	Spanish–American War	Battle of Guam	(Guam)	20–21 June	US forces capture island, Spanish governor protests since he was unaware of the declaration of war
1898	Spanish–American War	Battle of Las Guasimas	(Cuba)	24 June	First major land battle of the war
1898	Spanish–American War	Battle of Tayacoba	(Cuba)	30 June	US forces barely able to rescue trapped reconnaissance force.
1898	Spanish–American War	Battle of El Caney	(Cuba)	1 July	Spanish forces hold back Americans
1898	Spanish–American War	Battle of San Juan Hill	(Cuba)	1 July	Roosevelt storms the hill, American victory
1898	Spanish–American War	Battle of Santiago de Cuba	(Cuba)	3 July	Admiral Cervera's Spanish fleet destroyed trying to escape blockading US fleet and reach reinforcements
1898	Spanish–American War	Siege of Santiago	(Cuba)	3–18 July	US forces capture city but the outbreak of disease begins to take its toll on the Americans
1898	Spanish–American War	Battle of Rio Manimani	(Cuba)	23 July	Unsuccessful American landing attempt
1898	Spanish–American War	Battle of Yauco	(Puerto Rico)	26 July	American victory despite desertions
1898	Spanish–American War	Battle of Guayama	(Puerto Rico)	5 Aug	American push past Spanish snipers to take town.
1898	Spanish–American War	Battle of Guamani	(Puerto Rico)	9 Aug	American victory
1898	Spanish–American War	Battle of Coamo	(Puerto Rico)	9 Aug	Americans troops destroy the Spanish garrison at Coamo
1898	Spanish–American War	Battle of Silva Heights	(Puerto Rico)	10 Aug	Spanish forces retreat after US attack with cannons and gatling guns
1898	Spanish–American War	Battle of Abonito Pass	(Puerto Rico)	12 Aug	Battle interrupted by news of armistice
1898	Philippine Revolution and Spanish–American War	Battle of Manila	(Philippines)	25 July – 15 Aug	US and Filipino forces capture Manila Spanish
1898	Mahdist War	Battle of Omdurman	(Sudan)	2 Sep	British under Kitchener ambushed by Sudanese Dervishes
1898	Indian wars	Battle of Sugar Point	(United States)	5 Oct	Chippewa victory under Bugonaygeshig
1899	Philippine–American War	Battle of Manila	(Philippines)	4–5 Feb	American troops engage with the Philippine Army in the first battle of the war. After hard fighting, the Americans rout the Filipinos.
1899	Philippine–American War	First Battle of Caloocan	(Philippines)	10 Feb	American victory
1899	Philippine–American War	Second Battle of Caloocan	(Philippines)	22–24 Feb	American victory
1899	Philippine–American War	Battle of Balantang	(Philippines)	10 March	Philippines defeat Americans
1899	Philippine–American War	Battle of Marilao River	(Philippines)	27 March	American victory
1899	Second Samoan Civil War	Second Battle of Vailele	(Samoa)	1 April	Samoa, the UK and the USA defeat supporters of Mataʻafa Iosefo and Germany.
1899	Philippine–American War	Battle of Santa Cruz	(Philippines)	9–10 April	American Victory
1899	Philippine–American War	Battle of Pagsanjan	(Philippines)	11 April	Philippine forces routed by American sharpshooters and artillery
1899	Philippine–American War	Battle of Paete	(Philippines)	12 April	Americans under Lawton defeat small Philippine force
1899	Philippine–American War	Battle of Quingua	(Philippines)	23 April	Americans defeat Philippines
1899	Philippine–American War	Battle of Calumpit	(Philippines)	25–27 April	American victory
1899	Philippine–American War	Battle of Zapote River	(Philippines)	13 June	American victory
1899	Philippine–American War	Battle of Olongapo	(Philippines)	18–23 Sep	American victory
1899	Second Boer War	Battle of Kraaipan	(South Africa)	12 Oct	Boers (South African Republic and Orange Free State) defeat the United Kingdom.
1899	Boxer Rebellion	Battle of Senluo Temple	(China)	18 Oct	The Chinese Qing dynasty defeats the Boxers.
1899	Second Boer War	Battle of Talana Hill	(South Africa)	20 Oct	British Pyrrhic victory over the Boers
1899	Second Boer War	Battle of Elandslaagte	(South Africa)	21 Oct	Successful British cavalry charge in bad weather
1899	Thousand Days' War	Battle of a Thousand Days in Colombia	(Colombia)	24 Oct	Colombian Liberals vs. Conservatives, Conservative victory
1899	Second Boer War	Battle of Ladysmith	(South Africa)	30 Oct	Boers defeat the UK.
1899	Philippine–American War	Battle of San Jacinto	(Philippines)	11 Nov	American forces defeat Philippine Army under General Tinio
1899	Second Boer War	Battle of Belmont	(South Africa)	23 Nov	The UK defeats the Boers
1899	Second Boer War	Battle of Modder River	(South Africa)	28 Nov	British defeat Boers under Cronjé
1899	Philippine–American War	Battle of Tirad Pass	(Philippines)	2 Dec	The US defeat Philippine Forces
1899	Second Boer War	Battle of Stormberg	(South Africa)	10 Dec	Boer victory
1899	Second Boer War	Battle of Magersfontein	(South Africa)	11 Dec	Cronjé defeats British forces
1899	Second Boer War	Battle of Colenso	(South Africa)	15 Dec	British forces attacked while caught in a loop of a river, heavy casualties. Boer victory.
1899	Philippine–American War	Battle of Paye	(Philippines)	19 Dec	Philippine forces initially defeat American forces but are later defeated
1900	Second Boer War	Battle of Spion Kop	(South Africa)	24 Jan	Boer victory
1900	Second Boer War	Battle of Vaal Krantz	(South Africa)	5–7 Feb	Boers defeat the UK
1900	Second Boer War	Battle of Paardeberg	(South Africa)	18–27 Feb	British capture forces of Boer general Cronjé
1900	Second Boer War	Siege of Ladysmith	(South Africa)	2 Nov 1899 – 28 Feb 1900	Unsuccessful Boer siege
1900	Somaliland Campaign	Battle of Jigjiga	(Ethiopia)	5 Mar	The Dervish Movement defeats Ethiopia.
1900	Second Boer War	Battle of Poplar Grove	(South Africa)	7 March	The UK defeats the Boers
1900	Second Boer War	Battle of Sanna's Post	(South Africa)	31 March	British forces caught in double-pronged Boer ambush
1900	Second Boer War	Battle of Boshof	(South Africa)	5 April	The UK defeats the Boers
1900	Philippine–American War	Battle of Cagayan de Misamis	(Philippines)	7 April	The USA defeat the Philippines
1900	French colonization of Africa	Battle of Kousséri	(Cameroon)	22 April	France, the Sultanate of Bagirmi and Bornu Empire loyalists defeat the Kanem–Bornu Empire
1900	Philippine–American War	Battle of Agusan Hill	(Philippines)	14 May	The USA defeat the Philippines
1900	Second Boer War	Siege of Mafeking	(South Africa)	13 Oct 1899 – 17 May 1900	British forces withstand Boer siege
1900	Philippine-American War	Battle of Makahambus Hill	(Philippines)	4 June	The Philippines defeat the USA
1900	Second Boer War	Battle of Diamond Hill	(South Africa)	11–12 June	British Empire forces defeat Boers
1900	Second Boer War	Battle of Witpoort	(South Africa)	16 July	The UK defeats the Boers
1900	Thousand Days' War	Battle of Calidonia Bridge	(Panama)	24–26 July	The Conservatives defeat the Liberals in a civil war in Colombia
1900	Boxer Rebellion	Battle of Beicang	(China)	5 Aug	Japan, the UK, the USA, France and Russia defeat China
1900	Boxer Rebellion	Battle of Yangcun	(China)	6 Aug	The UK, the USA, France, Russa, Germany, Italy, Austria-Hungary and Japan defeat China
1900	Second Boer War	Battle of Elands River	(South Africa)	4–16 Aug	Australian and Rhodesian forces defeat Boers
1900	Philippine–American War	Battle of Pulang Lupa	(Philippines)	13 Sep	Filipino guerrillas ambush and defeat a US infantry column
1900	Philippine–American War	Battle of Mabitac	(Philippines)	17 Sep	Filipino soldiers under General Cailles outmaneuver the 37th and 15th US infantry regiments
1900	Boxer Rebellion	Battle of Beitang	(China)	20 Sep	Russia, Germany and France defeat China
1900	Second Boer War	Battle of Bothaville	(South Africa)	6 Nov	The UK defeats the Boers
1900	Second Boer War	Battle of Leliefontein	(South Africa)	7 Nov	Battle between the UK and the Boers
1900	Second Boer War	Battle of Nooitgedacht	(South Africa)	13 Dec	Boers defeat the UK

== See also ==
- List of Napoleonic Battles
- Battles of the American Civil War
