= Timeline of Quebec history (1791–1840) =

This section of the Timeline of Quebec history concerns the events in British North America relating to what is the present day province of Quebec, Canada between the time of the Constitutional Act of 1791 and the Act of Union 1840.

== 1790s ==
- 1790 – The Dechristianisation of France during the French Revolution marks the beginning of a sharp tightening of the powers and influence of the Roman Catholic Church in Quebec that would last until 1960.
- 1791 - The Constitutional Act is enacted by the British Parliament on June 10.
- 1792 - The first elections of Lower Canada are held on June 11.
- 1792 - The first session of the Parliament of Lower Canada opens on December 17.
- 1792 - On December 18, Jean-Antoine Panet is elected Speaker of the Legislative Assembly.
- 1792 - Opening of the first post office in Montreal on December 20.
- 1793 - Language debate at the Legislative Assembly of Quebec on January 21.
- 1793 - On January 27, Lower Canada-born Jean Basset presents a memoir to the National Convention in Revolutionary France in which he pleads for a reconquest of Canada.
- 1793 - France declares war on England on February 8.
- 1793 - Prorogation of the first session of the Parliament on May 9.
- 1793 - On September 23, governor Dorchester demands that the Assembly punishes foreigners threatening the British government in Canada or any seditious citizen.
- 1793 - In October, there are rumours that a French fleet is coming to retake Canada.
- 1793 - The second session of the Parliament opens on November 11.
- 1795 - Introduction of the first property tax in Lower Canada.
- 1796 - The first county of the Eastern Townships, Dunham, is created.
- 1797 - Robert Prescott becomes Governor General on April 27.
- 1798 - Beginning of Irish immigration to Canada.

== 1800s ==
- 1800 - Member of Parliament and Judge Pierre-Amable de Bonne presents a draft bill to create the Royal Institute on February 7.
- 1803 - Napoleon sells the Louisiana Territory to the United States. (See the Louisiana Purchase).
- 1804 - The taking down of Montreal's fortifications begin and last until 1809.
- 1804 - The legislative assembly of Lower Canada votes to abolish slavery.
- 1805 - Foundation of The Quebec Mercury (newspaper) by Thomas Cary, supporter of the British Tories.
- 1805 - Joseph-Octave Plessis becomes Bishop of Quebec.
- 1806 - Pierre-Stanislas Bédard and François Blanchet, members of the Parti Canadien, found the newspaper Le Canadien.
- 1807 - Election of Ezekiel Hart in Trois-Rivières during a by-election on April 11.
- 1807 - On August 29, James Henry Craig becomes governor of the British American colonies.
- 1808 - On February 1, the Legislative Assembly of Quebec criticizes the swearing-in of Ezekiel Hart because he is a Jew.
- 1808 - The Legislative Assembly votes the expulsion of Ezekiel Hart on February 20.
- 1808 - Louis-Joseph Papineau and Denis-Benjamin Viger are elected for the first time on April 27. They join the Parti Canadien.
- 1808 - On June 14, the owners of the newspaper Le Canadien were demoted from their functions in the government.
- 1809 - On April 18, the Legislative Assembly votes a resolution on the ineligibility of judges during elections.
- 1809 - Governor Craig dissolves the Parliament on May 15.
- 1809 - Elections on November 24.

== 1810s ==
- 1810 - On February 13, the Legislative Assembly passes three addresses: one for the King, one for the House of Lords and one for the House of Commons to request control over the budget.
- 1810 - On February 23, the Legislative Assembly of Quebec votes to expel the Member of Parliament and Judge Pierre-Amable de Bonne.
- 1810 - On March 10, Jonathan Sewell and Pierre-Amable de Bonne found the newspaper Le Vrai Canadien which defends the policies of the government.
- 1810 - On March 17, Governor James Craig stops the press of Le Canadien and arrests its owners on charges of treasonous writings .
- 1810 - On May 1, Governor Craig recommends to the British Parliament to unite Upper and Lower Canada.
- 1810 - On September 10, New Spain (México) declares its Independence from Spain.
- 1811 - Pierre-Stanislas Bédard is released from prison in March after having been held for twelve months pending trial.
- 1811 - On May 31, George Prevost becomes governor of Lower Canada.
- 1811 – The Parti Canadien chooses James Stuart to succeed Pierre-Stanislas Bédard as party leader.
- 1811 - Founding of the newspaper the Montreal Herald by William Grey.
- 1812 - War of 1812: Second American invasion of Canada.
- 1815 - On January 21, Louis-Joseph Papineau is elected speaker of the Legislative Assembly.
- 1817 - Founding of the Bank of Montreal.
- 1818 - The frontier between British North America and the United States is established at the 49th northern parallel.

== 1820s ==
- 1820 - A Union project is again discussed by London and the government of Lower Canada.
- 1821 - McGill University obtains its royal charter.
- 1822 - Lower Canadian British merchants and bureaucrats petition for the Union of Upper and Lower Canada into a single colony before the British Parliament in London.
- 1823 - On May 10, Louis-Joseph Papineau and John Neilson are in London to present a petition of 60,000 signatures against the Union project.
- 1824 - Alexander Wolff (soldier) and his men arrive in Halifax to establish themselves on a land grant from England in CFB Valcartier where he became commander of the 11th Battalion of the Quebec Militia.
- 1825 - Opening of the Lachine Canal.
- 1826 - Ludger Duvernay, Auguste-Norbert Morin, and Jacques Viger found the newspaper La Minerve.
- 1826 - The Parti Canadien becomes the Parti patriote.
- 1827 - The Parti Patriote sends a delegation of three Members of Parliament -- John Neilson, Denis-Benjamin Viger and Augustin Cuvillier—to London with a petition of 87,000 names and a series of resolution passed by the Legislative Assembly.
- 1828 - London appoints James Kempt to replace Dalhousie.
- 1828 - On December 12, Daniel Tracey founds the newspaper The Irish Vindicator and Canada General Advertiser, which became The Montreal Vindicator soon after.
- 1829 - McGill University begins instruction in 1829 with the Faculty of Medicine.

== 1830s ==
- 1830 - Lord Matthew Aylmer is appointed Governor.
- 1830 - The Port of Montreal is officially created.
- 1831 - Alexis de Tocqueville, French aristocrat conservative political thinker and author of Democracy in America, spends a few days in the summer of 1831 in Lower Canada.
- 1831 - Ludger Duvernay and Daniel Tracey are arrested and charged with sedition.
- 1831 - Henry Musgrave Blaiklock designs the Marine and Emigrant Hospital of Quebec, a prime example of neoclassical architecture in Lower Canada.
- 1832 - Daniel Tracey spends 35 days in prison in January for writing an editorial that encouraged physical attacks on members of the colonial government.
- 1832 - During a by-election in Montreal on May 21, rioting erupted and British soldiers opened fire on the crowd and killed three people.
- 1832 - A first cholera epidemic kills 6,000 people.
- 1832 - Following the 1808 expulsion of the Ezekiel Hart, a Jew, from the Legislative Assembly of Quebec, the assembly passes a law giving full political rights to the Jewish citizens of Lower Canada (the 1832 Emancipation Act), a first in the British Empire and some 27 years before Great Britain itself.
- 1833 - Foundation of the Club des femmes patriotes (Patriot Women's Club).
- 1834 - Foundation of the Saint-Jean-Baptiste Society on June 24.
- 1834 - Foundation of the monarchist Quebec Constitutional Association.
- 1834 - The Parti patriote is elected with a strong majority of the registered vote, taking 77 of 88 seats in the Legislative Assembly of Quebec. (L’élection générale de 1834 permet à la population bas-canadienne de faire choix de quatre-vingt-huit députés, répartis sur un total de quarante-six circonscriptions. /The general election of 1834 allowed voters of Lower Canada to choose 88 deputies, spread over a total of 46 constituencies.)
- 1834 - The Legislative Assembly presents the Ninety-Two Resolutions, a document requesting democratic reforms in Lower Canada.
- 1835 - Founding of the monarchist Montreal Constitutional Association in January.
- 1835 - Creation of the Union patriotique.
- 1835 - Louis-Michel Viger and Jacob De Witt found La Banque du Peuple. It becomes a chartered bank in 1844.
- 1836 - Founding of the Doric Club, a reincarnation of the banned British Rifle Corp.
- 1836 - The laws establishing the normal schools of the country are passed. They would have been the first secular, public, and free schools of Lower Canada.
- 1837 - On March 6, the British Parliament resolutions arrive in Lower Canada, rejecting the major demands of the colonists, Prime Minister Russell believing it was impossible for a governor to be responsible to the sovereign and a local legislature at the same time.
- 1837 - Foundation of the Comité central et permanent in April.
- 1837 - Founded in August, the Société des Fils de la Liberté holds its first public assembly on September 5.
- 1837 - Town Hall meetings are held throughout Lower Canada between May and November.
- 1837, November 6 - The Doric Club members attack the Fils de la liberté, members of the Doric Club destroy the office of Thomas Storrow Brown at the Vindicator newspaper.
- 1837 - On November 8, General John Colborne begins to recruit volunteers for militias which are placed under the command of lieutenant-colonel Dyer.
- 1837 - On November 16, Lord Gosford orders the arrest of 26 patriots leaders on charges of high treason.
- 1837 - On November 23 British courier is killed in Saint-Denis-sur-Richelieu in an attack by the Fils de la Liberté.
- 1837 - Battle of Saint-Denis on November 23.
- 1837 - Battle of Saint-Charles on November 25.
- 1837 - Patriots take control of Saint-Eustache on November 30.
- 1837 - Proclamation of martial law in the district of Montreal on December 5.
- 1837 - 80 Patriots are forced to retreat at Moore's Corner near the American border on December 6.
- 1837 - On December 13, General John Colborne, Lord Seaton, leaves Montreal for Saint-Eustache leading 1,300 men.
- 1837 - Battle of Saint-Eustache on December 14.
- 1837 - The British troops sacked and burned the villages of Saint-Benoît and Saint-Eustache.
- 1838 - February 26, Robert Nelson, General of the Patriots, gathers between 600 and 700 volunteers, the Frères Chasseurs and American sympathisers launch an attack on the British in Lower Canada.
- 1838 - Robert Nelson proclaims the independence of Lower Canada in Week's House on February 28. See the Déclaration d'indépendance du Bas-Canada.
- 1838 - The Constitutional Act is suspended on March 27. A Special Council is formed by London.
- 1838 - The envoy of the British government, John George Lambton, Lord of Durham, arrives in Quebec City on May 27.
- 1838 - Proclamation of amnesty for all prisoners, except eight who are exiled to Bermuda, on June 28.
- 1838 - The Frères Chasseurs take positions in Beauharnois, Sainte-Martine and Saint-Mathias-sur-Richelieu on November 3.
- 1838 - New proclamation of martial law on November 4.
- 1838 - Battle of Lacolle on November 7.
- 1838 - Battle of Odelltown on November 9. End of the Lower Canada Rebellion.
- 1838 - Creation of a military court to judge 108 men.
- 1839 - Publishing of the report of Lord Durham on February 11.
- 1839 - Following a trial for treason and murder, 12 Patriots were hung at the Pied-du-Courant Prison on February 15.
- 1839 - Charles Poulett Thomson, Lord Sydenham, succeeds Lord Durham as governor general of the Canadas.

== 1840s ==
- 1840 - The Act of Union receives royal assent on July 23.

== See also ==
Preceded by 1760 to 1790	Timeline of Quebec history 1791 to 1840	Succeeded by 1841 to 1866
