= Durham Report =

1839 report regarding rebellions in Canada

Report on the Affairs of British North America
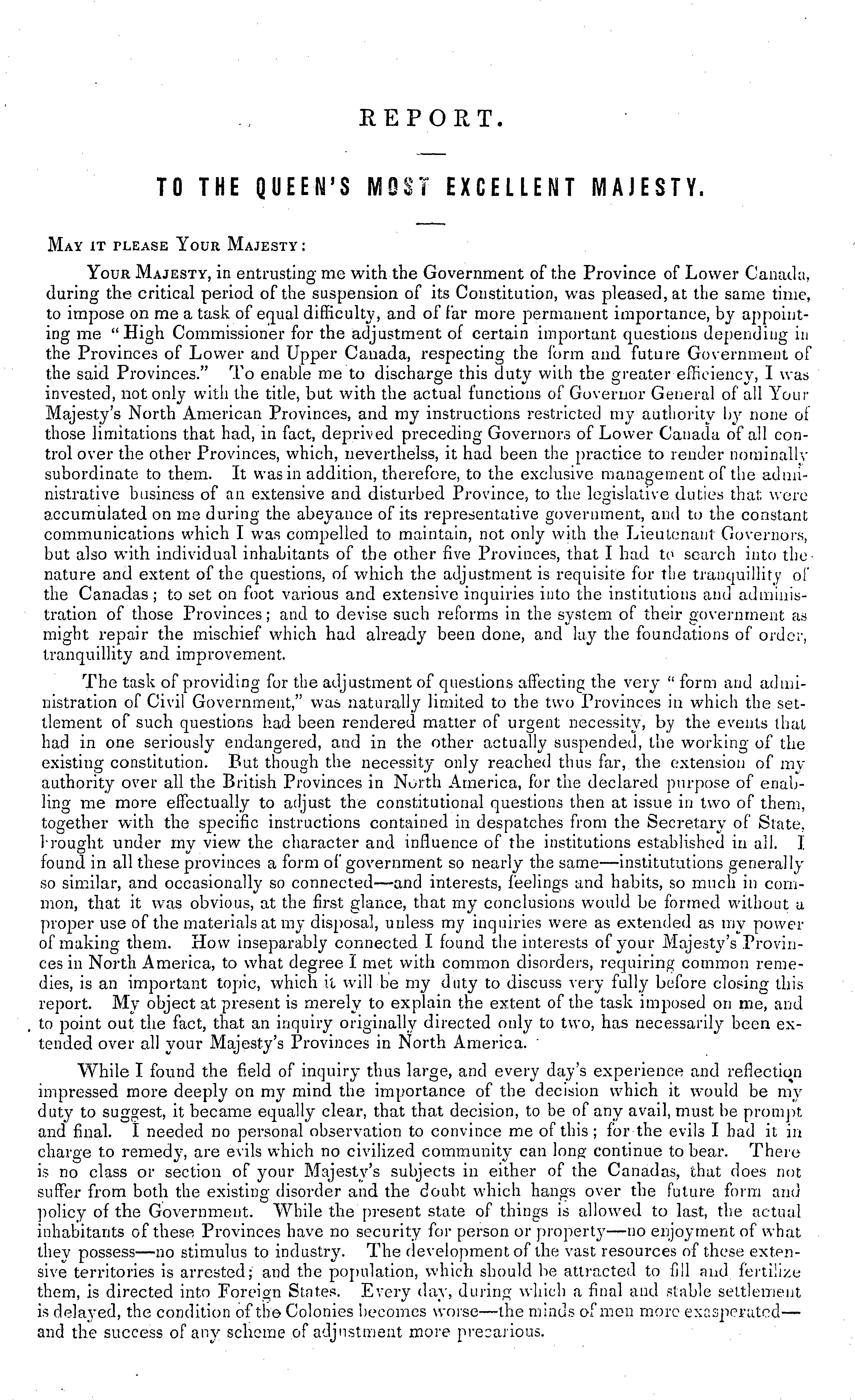
- First page of the report
- Also known as: Durham Report
- Type: Government report
- Date: February 11, 1839
- Author: John Lambton, 1st Earl of Durham

The Report on the Affairs of British North America, (French: Rapport sur les affaires de l’Amérique du Nord britannique, 1839) commonly known as the Durham Report or Lord Durham's Report, is an important document in the history of Quebec, Ontario, Canada and the British Empire. It called for reforms that sought to address concerns expressed during the rebellions of 1837–38.

The Report was written by the notable British Whig politician John Lambton, 1st Earl of Durham, who was sent to the Canadas in 1838 to investigate and report on the causes of the rebellions of 1837–38. He had just been appointed Governor General and given special powers as high commissioner of British North America.

On the first page of his report he stated that "[w]hile the present state of things is allowed to last, the actual inhabitants of these Provinces have no security for person or property—no enjoyment of what they possess—no stimulus to industry." He would return to that theme repeatedly throughout his report.

The Report was controversial. In Upper Canada the dominant Tory elite rejected it, while out-of-power reformers welcomed the ideal of responsible government. In Lower Canada, anglophone Tories were supportive because its provisions would enable them to remain in power. French Canadians were opposed to a union that called for "obliterating [their] nationality." The Report led to major reforms and democratic advances. The two Canadas were subsequently merged into a single colony, the Province of Canada, in the 1840 Act of Union. It moved Canada slowly on the path to "responsible government", which took a decade. In the long run, it advanced democracy and played a central role in the evolution of Canada's political independence from Britain.

== Inquiry ==
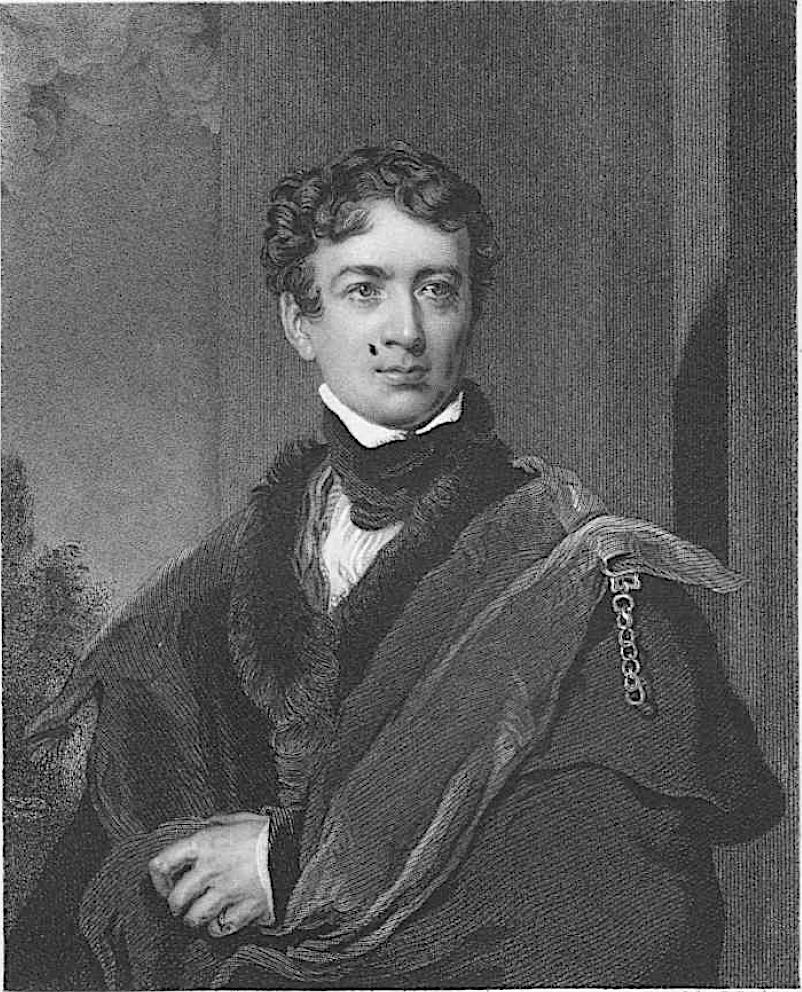
Lord Durham, author of the report

In Upper Canada and Lower Canada, he formed numerous committees with essentially all the opponents of the Patriotes and made numerous personal observations on life in the colonies.

Durham arrived in Quebec City on 29 May. Durham knew how to organize support in Upper Canada. His writing team drew upon a long tradition of petitioning and the example of political activism in Britain. They engaged in extensive advance publicity and public processions to attract audiences for meetings. The goal was to convince London of the widespread popular support in Canada for the report proposals. The meetings were represented as nonpartisan, respectable, loyal, orderly and deserving of parliamentary support.

Durham also visited the United States.

He wrote that he had assumed that the rebellions had been based on liberalism and economics. However, he eventually concluded that the real problem was the conflict between the traditionalist French and the modernizing English, and that assimilation of the French minority, through their adoption of the political institutions and the "superior advantages of their English competitors", had effectively put an end to the tensions between the two communities.

According to Durham, the culture of the French Canadians had changed little in 200 years and showed no sign of the progress that British culture had made. His report contains the famous assessment that Lower Canada had "two nations warring within the bosom of a single state" and that the French Canadians were "a people with no literature and no history".

There can hardly be conceived a nationality more destitute of all that can invigorate and elevate a people, than that which is exhibited by the descendants of the French in Lower Canada, owing to their retaining their peculiar language and manners. They are a people with no history, and no literature. ...

[I]t is on this essentially foreign [French] literature, which is conversant about events, opinions, and habits of life, perfectly strange and unintelligible to them, that they are compelled to be dependent. ...

In these circumstances I should be indeed surprised, if the more reflecting part of the French Canadians entertained at present any hope of continuing to preserve their nationality.

== Content ==
Durham had become the Governor-General in Lower Canada in 1837 but soon submitted his resignation because of his conflict with British Parliament mostly because of his progressive nature. He believed the British Parliament should give the colonies more power by a responsible government. Lord Durham was sent back to Canada in 1838 by British Parliament and the Crown to investigate the cause behind the rebellions of both Upper and Lower Canada and propose suggestions to fix any remaining problems and lessen the chance of future rebellions.

Lord Durham found that although the rebellions of Upper and Lower Canada were over, peace and unity were yet to be found in Canada. The people living in both colonies in Canada were struggling, as the economic situation in both areas all but collapsed. Poor farming conditions that year led to reduced harvests and increased poverty for farmers. As well as increased political tension and bitterness between parties and races of people, particularly in Lower Canada. Both Canadas were in a state of distress. Durham brought along a small but highly talented staff, most notably including Charles Buller and Edward Gibbon Wakefield. The three of them collaborated to prepare and write the report. It was generally disparaged or ignored in Britain but did draw attention from some leading British intellectuals such as John Stuart Mill. Much more important was the impact on Anglophone Canada, where led by Joseph Howe, Robert Baldwin, and Louis-Hippolyte Lafontaine it produced dramatic reforms.

The report was entitled "Report on the Affairs of British North America". It was considered controversial as it suggested radical ideas for the time, such as for the British Parliament granting the Canadas a responsible government.

The two most well-known suggestions from Lord Durham's report were the fusion of Upper and Lower Canada, to become a single unified colony, the Province of Canada, ruled under a single legislature, and to introduce a responsible government. Durham had believed that to be inevitable because of the progressive nature of the colony's neighbour, the United States. He believed as those ideas were already available to the people and understood, nothing less would be accepted or tolerated and so it must be embraced to satisfy the people and maintain the peace: "establishing a representative government in the North American Colonies. That has been irrevocably done and the experiment of depriving the people of their present constitutional power is not to be thought of."

Durham also recommended the creation of a municipal government and a supreme court in British North America. He was interested in not only unifying Upper and Lower Canada but also including Nova Scotia and New Brunswick. He also wanted to resolve the issue of land over Prince Edward Island, but those suggestions failed to come to fruition since the Maritime Provinces were then uninterested. Those suggestions would be put into place decades later, during the Confederation of Canada.

However, Durham believed that the problems in mostly Lower Canada were not of a political nature, but rather of an ethnic one. The assimilation of French Canadians would solve this issue, and the unification of the two Canadas would provide an effective way of doing so, first by giving the union an English majority, which would rule over the French Canadian population minority and second, by reinforcing its influence every year through English emigration.

[T]he strong arm of a popular legislature would compel the obedience of the refractory population; and the hopelessness of success would gradually subdue the existing animosities, and incline the French Canadian population to acquiesce in their new state of political existence.

=== Racial context ===
Several references to "race" are made in this report, referring to French Canadians or Canadiens as one race and to the English or Anglo-Canadians as another.

It will be acknowledged by every one who has observed the progress of Anglo-Saxon colonization in America, that sooner or later the English race was sure to predominate even numerically in Lower Canada, as they predominate already, by their superior knowledge, energy, enterprise, and wealth. The error, therefore, to which the present contest must be attributed is the vain endeavour to preserve a French Canadian nationality in the midst of Anglo-American colonies and states.

And is this French Canadian nationality one which, for the good merely of that people, we ought to strive to perpetuate, even if it were possible? I know of no national distinctions marking and continuing a more hopeless inferiority. The language, the laws, the character of the North American continent are English; and every race but the English (I apply this to all who speak the English language) appears in a condition of inferiority. It is to elevate them from that inferiority that I desire to give to the Canadians our English character.

This is because, at the time of the report, English speakers used the word race to mean ethnicity, referring to the populations of European states as "the English race", "the German race" etc.

== Important passages ==
"The French complained of the arrogance and injustice of the English; the English accused the French of the vices of a weak and conquered people, and charged them with meanness and perfidy. The entire mistrust which the two races have thus learned to conceive of each other's intentions, induces them to put the worst construction on the most innocent conduct; to judge every word, every act, and every intention unfairly; to attribute the most odious designs, and reject every overture of kindness or fairness, as covering secret designs of treachery and malignity."

"At first sight it appears much more difficult to form an accurate idea of the state of Upper than of Lower Canada. The visible and broad line of demarcation which separates parties by the distinctive characters of race, happily has no existence in the Upper Province. The quarrel is one of an entirely English, if not British population. Like all such quarrels, it has, in fact, created, not two, but several parties; each of which has some objects in common with some one of those to which it is opposed. They differ on one point, and agree on another; the sections, which unite together one day, are strongly opposed the next; and the very party, which acts as one, against a common opponent, is in truth composed of divisions seeking utterly different or incompatible objects. It is very difficult to make out from the avowals of parties the real objects of their struggles, and still less easy is it to discover any cause of such importance as would account for its uniting any large mass of the people in an attempt to overthrow, by forcible means, the existing form of Government."

"We are not now to consider the policy of establishing representative government in the North American Colonies. That has been irrevocably done; and the experiment of depriving the people of their present constitutional power, is not to be thought of. To conduct their Government harmoniously, in accordance with its established principles, is now the business of its rulers; and I know not how it is possible to secure that harmony in any other way, than by administering the Government on those principles which have been found perfectly efficacious in Great Britain. I would not impair a single prerogative of the Crown; on the contrary, I believe that the interests of the people of these Colonies require the protection of prerogatives, which have not hitherto been exercised. But the Crown must, on the other hand, submit to the necessary consequences of representative institutions; and if it has to carry on the Government in unison with a representative body, it must consent to carry it on by means of those in whom that representative body has confidence."

"A plan by which it is proposed to ensure the tranquil government of Lower Canada, must include in itself the means of putting an end to the agitation of national disputes in the legislature, by settling, at once and for ever, the national character of the Province. I entertain no doubts as to the national character which must be given to Lower Canada; it must be that of the British Empire; that of the majority of the population of British America; that of the great race which must, in the lapse of no long period of time, be predominant over the whole North American Continent. Without effecting the change so rapidly or so roughly as to shock the feelings and trample on the welfare of the existing generation, it must henceforth be the first and steady purpose of the British Government to establish an English population, with English laws and language, in this Province, and to trust its government to none but a decidedly English Legislature."

== Recommendations ==
Durham made two main recommendations:

- that Upper and Lower Canada be united into one province, and
- the introduction of responsible government for all colonies in British North America

The British Parliament implemented the first point immediately but not the second. Responsible government was only granted to these colonies after 1848.

=== Implementation of recommendations ===
The proposed merger would benefit Upper Canada as, whereas the construction of canals would lead to a considerable debt load, access to the fiscal surplus of former Lower Canada would allow that debt to be erased.

The newly created Legislative Assembly of the Province of Canada was required to have equal representation from Canada East and Canada West, even though the population of Canada East was considerably larger. In 1840, the population of Canada East was estimated at 670,000, while the population of Canada West was estimated to be 480,000. Lord Durham had not recommended this approach and had instead proposed that the representation should be based on the respective populations of the two regions. The British government rejected that recommendation and instead implemented equal representation, apparently to give the English-speaking population of the new province a dominant voice in the provincial government, furthering the goal of assimilating the French-speaking population.

== Reactions ==
In exile in France, Louis-Joseph Papineau published the Histoire de la résistance du Canada au gouvernement anglais (History of the resistance of Canada to the English government) in the French La Revue du Progrès in May 1839. In June, it appeared in Canada in Ludger Duvernay's La Revue canadienne as Histoire de l'insurrection du Canada en réfutation du Rapport de Lord Durham (History of the insurrection of Canada in refutation of the Report of Lord Durham).

The assertion that the so-called "French" Canadians had no history and no culture and that the conflict was primarily that of two ethnic groups evidently outraged Papineau. It was pointed out that many of the Patriote leaders were of British or British Canadian origin, including among others Wolfred Nelson, the hero of the Battle of Saint-Denis; Robert Nelson, author of the Declaration of Independence of Lower Canada, who would have become President of Lower Canada had the second insurrection succeeded; journalist Edmund Bailey O'Callaghan; and Thomas Storrow Brown, general during the Battle of Saint-Charles. It was also pointed out that an uprising had occurred in Upper Canada where there was only one "race". According to Papineau and other Patriotes, the analysis of the economic situation of French Canadians was biased. Indeed, from 1791 to the rebellions, the elected representatives of Lower Canada had been demanding control over the budget of the colony.

== Impact outside Canada ==
The general conclusions of the report regarding self-governance eventually spread to various other white settler colonies, including Australia and New Zealand in the 1850s (with Western Australia receiving self-government in 1890). The parallel nature of government organization in Australia and Canada to this day is an ongoing proof of the long-enduring effects of the report's recommendations.

The report did not see any of its recommendations come into force in the African and Asian colonies, but some limited democratic reforms in India became possible that otherwise would not have been.

== Conclusion ==
Durham resigned on 9 October 1838 amid controversy excited in London by his decision of the penal questions and was soon replaced by Charles Poulett Thomson, 1st Baron Sydenham, who was responsible for implementing the Union of the Canadas. The report of Durham was laid before Parliament in London on 11 February 1839.

== See also ==
- History of Canada
- Rebellions of 1837
- Charles Buller
- Edward Gibbon Wakefield
- Richard Hanson (Australian politician)
