= Battle of Saint-Denis (1837) =

Military conflict of the Lower Canada Rebellion

- Part of the Lower Canada Rebellion
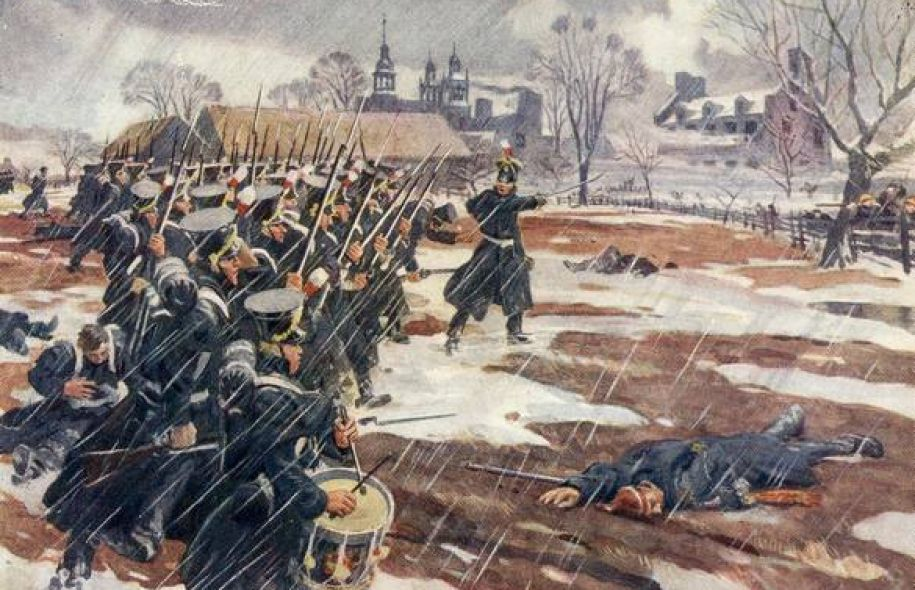
- Les Fils de la Liberté hurl back British regulars at the Battle of Saint-Denis. Contemporary watercolour.
| Date | November 23, 1837 |
| Location | Saint-Denis, Quebec |
| Result | Patriote victory |

Belligerents
| United Kingdom | Patriotes |

Commanders and leaders
| Charles Stephen Gore | Wolfred Nelson |

Strength
| 300 regulars 1 cannon | 200 militia 600 lightly armed civilians |

Casualties and losses
| 6 killed 10 wounded 6 missing 1 cannon | 12 dead 7 wounded |

The Battle of Saint-Denis was fought on November 23, 1837, between British colonial authorities under Lieutenant-Colonel Gore and Patriote rebels in Lower Canada as part of the Lower Canada Rebellion. The Patriotes were led by Wolfred Nelson. Gore was sent to quell the uprising in the Richelieu River valley in conjunction with a force led by Lieutenant-Colonel George Wetherall. Gore was the first to arrive at a Patriote-held site. Nelson had organized the defence with most of the well-armed rebels within a stone house that overlooked the road. Gore, accompanied by only one cannon, attempted to take the stone house three times, with the cannon providing ineffective fire. Another attempt to flank the house to the left failed when Gore's soldiers encountered the less well-armed militia. Running out of ammunition, the British retreated. This marked the only Patriote victory in 1837, as this battle was followed by two defeats at Saint-Charles and Saint-Eustache.

== Background ==
Within twenty years of the establishment of Lower Canada in 1791, new tracts of land were set aside for settlement by peoples other than French Canadians. The French remained predominantly on the seigneuries located by rivers and the new areas were settled largely by English-speaking British immigrants. The new English-speaking immigrants reaped greater benefits than the existing French communities under the British government. Those French Canadians who were elected to the Legislative Assembly of Lower Canada were mainly of the elite educated at Catholic colleges, because social movement was restricted by the British who monopolized commerce and government postings. The French Canadian habitants faced diminishing lands to give to their children and competed with the English for the new lands on English terms, with British bureaucracy placing immigrant claims ahead of those of the habitants. Furthermore, outbreaks in dysentery, typhus and cholera swept through the colony in the mid-1830s, brought by arriving immigrants. Additionally, farms in the Beauce, Chaudière and Richelieu regions (and to a lesser extent, the area around Montreal) were devastated by wheat fly, grasshopper and caterpillar infestations, reducing the food available.

Efforts by the French within the Legislative Assembly, led by Louis-Joseph Papineau, the elected leader of the Parti Patriote, to control government spending, were thwarted by the English-dominated Legislative Council of Lower Canada. Further discontent was stimulated when two journalist supporters of Papineau were arrested and jailed after disparaging the Legislative Council in their newspapers. The ensuing riot on May 21, 1832, was quashed when the garrison was called out, ending with three dead. Prolonged aggravation of the economic situation in the province led to growing discontent. Papineau submitted the Ninety-Two Resolutions to the British government with respect to the governance of the province in 1834. A response was sent in 1837 known as the Ten Resolutions which rejected all of Papineau's resolutions. The response of the Patriotes was antagonistic. Large public rallies were held at Saint-Marc-sur-Richelieu, Saint-Hyacinthe, Chambly, Sainte-Scholastique and Montreal. Further rallies held around Montreal drew increased crowds throughout the summer months of 1837. On October 23 a large six-county rally was held at Saint-Charles, where several leaders called for revolt and issued a series of resolutions demanding changes from the government. Violence began with a clash in the streets of Montreal on November 6 between Patriotes and the loyalist Doric Club. The supporters of Papineau formed para-military groups and visible support was seen in Montreal and villages to the east of the city. Sir John Colborne, commander of the military in the Canadian colonies, called out the militia and sent out warrants for arrest of suspected rebels on November 16. Papineau and other Patriote leaders fled Montreal to Saint-Denis in the Richelieu valley.

== Prelude ==
Map showing the Lake Champlain-River Richelieu watershed

=== Patriotes ===
The Patriotes were organized into civil and military wings. The military wing was commanded by Thomas Storrow Brown, a failed merchant from Montreal. The civil wing was organized into six sections, each representing a district and each of which could be armed as a battalion in the event of war. The Patriotes had two headquarters, one in Saint-Denis and the other in Saint-Charles.

The Patriotes in Saint-Denis were commanded by Wolfred Nelson. At his disposal were roughly 800 men, of which roughly half were armed with guns. The vast majority of the men were young, though there were some professionals and veterans within the group. To prevent desertion, Nelson threatened to cut the throat of any who ran. On the road from Sorel, Nelson placed overturned wagons and lattices of heavy brushwood. The church and town lay along the riverbank, preventing encirclement. To the other side of the town were woods that thinned as they got closer to Saint-Denis. The largest building in Saint-Denis was an old stone two-storey coach house that was owned by Madame St. Germain, who had moved out. The coach house, with walls 4 feet (1.2 m) thick, commanded the road and Nelson had loopholes cut in the walls. Nelson placed approximately 200 of his men within the house, most equipped with firearms. Around the coach house was situated a cluster of buildings.

Nelson set up a second strongpoint at his stone distillery where he placed more of his forces that were equipped with firearms. Those without firearms, most equipped with scythes, pitchforks and clubs, were placed in earthworks behind the church, though some of these did desert before the battle. North of the town the road ran through flat, plowed land, with the Richelieu River running close to the edge of the fields. Beyond the fields were woods in which Nelson placed skirmishers and outposts and had the bridges within broken. The Patriotes had been warned of the British approach during the night, and Nelson sent messengers into the countryside to call upon the inhabitants to defend St-Denis.

One-half mile (0.80 km) from the river bank, Papineau and Edmund Bailey O'Callaghan were waiting at Nelson's home. Shortly after the battle began, the two departed for St-Charles. Though his reasons for departure are unknown, some hold that Papineau believed they would fail and fled. His departure created mixed feelings among the Patriotes at all levels of the organization.

=== Government ===
The government of Lower Canada was headed by the Earl of Gosford, a civilian governor general. The military was headed by Sir John Colborne, a veteran of the Peninsular War. At Colborne's disposal in Lower Canada were several British infantry regiments. At Quebec City, were the Royal Regiment, 15th, 79th, 83rd Regiments of Foot and elements of the 66th Regiment of Foot. At Montreal, the 32nd Regiment of Foot was posted and at Île aux Noix and Sorel, further elements of the 66th Regiment were garrisoned. On Saint Helen's Island in the Saint Lawrence River, elements of the Royal Artillery were posted. As events grew more unstable in the territory, Colborne ordered the Royal Regiment to Montreal. Following the riot in Montreal between Thomas Storrow Brown's Société des Fils de la Liberté and the loyalist Doric Club, Colborne ordered the 24th Regiment of Foot to deploy to Montreal from their garrisons at Toronto and Kingston, Upper Canada.

Colborne planned his attack on the Patriote headquarters from two directions. He dispatched Colonel Charles Gore with 300 infantry composed of two companies of the 24th Regiment, one 12-pounder (5.4 kg) cannon with a detachment of Royal Artillery and members of the Royal Montreal Cavalry, a militia unit. The other force would be commanded by Lieutenant-Colonel George Wetherall of the Royal Regiment, leading three companies of the Royal Regiment, one company of the 66th Regiment and twenty Royal Montreal Cavalry and a Royal Artillery detachment and two 6-pounder (2.7 kg) guns. Gore was to attack the rebels from the north via Sorel, while Wetherall would attack from the south via Fort Chambly.

== Battle ==
=== March south ===
On November 22, Gore arrived at Sorel at 18:00. He ordered one company of the 32nd Regiment, four companies of the 24th regiment, an artillery detachment with one 24-pounder gun and a troop of Montreal cavalry to depart. At 22:00, the force of 300 departed Sorel in the freezing rain. Saint-Denis was 18 miles (29 km) south of Sorel and the roads were surrounded by woods. The weather changed to rain mixed with snow, turning the roads into mud knee-deep with frozen potholes.

At 23:00, a caleche departed Sorel containing an officer of the 32nd regiment carrying orders for Lieutenant-Colonel Gore, which ordered him to await Wetherall's advance. However, roughly 10 miles (16 km) down the road, the caleche took a wrong turn and the officer ended up a prisoner of the Patriotes. Taken to Saint-Denis, the officer was later killed trying to escape during the battle.

As Gore approached Saint-Denis, skirmishers fired upon the column from the woods before retreating towards town. The British approach was heralded by church bells along the river. Upon arrival at Saint-Denis, Gore had the gun unlimbered and fired one roundshot at the coach house, doing no damage. A strong east wind had taken hold and it had begun snowing. Gore then arranged his forces and moved forward until halting at a coulee. From there he surveyed the town.

=== Assault ===
Gore ordered one company to cross the fields, accompanied by the gun, and set up a position at a barn on the right that would keep the gun in range of the coach house while providing some shelter. The company drove the barn's defenders off after a bayonet charge. As the gun was made ready, the position came under fire from the coach house and three gunners were wounded before the cannon could fire its first round. The cannon's first shot went through the second-storey window, killing three Patriotes. The second, third and fourth shots rebounded harmlessly off the walls. The fire coming from the coach house forced the artillerymen to move the cannon to safer position.

Gore decided to assault the building after watching the cannon fire rebound off the stone walls of the coach house. He ordered Captain Markham of the 32nd Regiment to lead three companies of roughly 200 men to assault the house. Markham tried three times and by 12:00 had cleared the buildings which surrounded the approach to the coach house. By 13:00, the British troops were in the house across the street from the coach house. However, they came under crossfire from the stone distillery and the coach house. Markham was injured three times, twice in the neck, once in the leg. Markham ordered a withdrawal, himself being carried on a stretcher and by 14:00 the British had withdrawn to the coulee.

Around 13:00 Nelson sent George-Étienne Cartier across the river to collect reinforcements. All the while, the cannon had continued to fire ineffectively though little to no return fire was coming from the second floor of the coach house. Gore made another attempt to take the town, sending his troops on an encircling mission to the left. As the British began making their way through the outbuildings, they encountered the earthworks that were filled with roughly 500 men. The advance lost momentum. At this point Cartier returned with reinforcements numbering roughly 100 and drove at the British right flank. This coincided with a sortie from the coach house and the earthworks. The British retreated once again to the coulee.

This time, the Patriotes began to move towards the British position. At 15:00, there remained only 6 rounds for the cannon of the 66 the artillery had brought with them. Gore ordered retreat and at 16:00, the British departed leaving wagons and some wounded behind. However as they reached a bridge, the gun became frozen in the mud and both the horses and the men were unable to free it. Gore was forced to spike the gun and retreat back to Saint-Ours.

== Aftermath ==
At 00:00 on November 24, Gore stopped at Saint-Ours. The return to Sorel began at dawn and en route to Sorel, they encountered their reinforcements of one infantry company and two guns. Gore ordered all of them to return to Sorel, which they reached at 11:00. The British had suffered 6 dead, 10 wounded, and 6 missing. The Patriotes had suffered 12 dead and 7 wounded. Gore returned to Montreal where he received new orders from Colborne and additional troops.

In early December, Gore returned to Sorel with his new troops aboard the steamship John Bull and embarked the troops that he had there. Gore attempted to sail down to Saint-Denis, but the river was blocked with ice, and Gore was forced to march. Eight companies of infantry and four guns accompanied Gore on the march. At the site where he had left his cannon (which was still there, frozen in the mud) he was met by a group of villagers bearing a white flag. They claimed that there were no longer Patriotes in the town.

Scouts returned to Gore reporting that new barricades and earthworks had been erected, but were incomplete and no defenders were found. Nelson had attempted to fortify Saint-Denis, but after the Patriote rout at the Battle of Saint-Charles, he lost hope and fled to the United States. The British column entered the town and began to search houses. The property of every rebel was to be destroyed. The coach house was blown up with gunpowder and set afire, as was Nelson's house and distillery. In the end, over 50 buildings were burned over two days.

On December 4, Gore took five companies and two guns and moved on to Saint-Charles and then on to Saint-Hyacinthe, searching for Papineau. He found that Papineau had fled ahead of the British advance. The following day, Gore returned to Saint-Denis via Saint-Charles, leaving garrisons in both towns. On December 6, Gore departed for Montreal, arriving the following day.

The Patriotes suffered a second major defeat at Saint-Eustache which ended the uprising in December 1837. The government troops summarily executed some Patriotes captured at the battles; others that were captured were imprisoned awaiting their fate. Government troops burned several houses and set one entire village on fire following the battles.

Some Patriotes which had managed to escape the defeats fled to the United States where they re-mustered under new leadership. They returned better armed the following year and the rebellion erupted again in November 1838. Government troops returned to defeat the Patriotes in a series of battles, and again burned entire areas, along with pillaging and raping. Of the prisoners captured in the rebellion, 25 were hanged and 58 were deported to penal colonies in Australia.
