= Battle of Baker's Farm =

1838 battle of the Lower Canada Rebellion

Coordinates: 45.220500°N 73.839278°W

- Part of the Lower Canada Rebellion
Date	November 8, 1838
Location	Sainte-Martine, Quebec
Result	Patriotes victory

Belligerents
(United Kingdom) Lower Canada	Patriotes

Commanders and leaders
Unknown	James Perrigo; Joson Dumochelle

Strength
Unknown	800 Patriotes

The Battle of Baker's Farm took place in Lower Canada on November 8, 1838, during the Patriot's War. It was the first and last military success of the Patriotes in the campaign of 1838. 800 Patriotes gathered on a farm near Sainte-Martine, Quebec, and fought off several attacks by Loyalist volunteers. After news of the defeat of Patriote forces at the Battle of Odelltown spread, the massed Patriotes dispersed before the arrival of British troops.

== Background ==
In 1837, the Russell Resolutions were made law by the British Parliament, imposing taxation without representation and rejecting all Patriote reforms for Lower Canada. This led to a confrontation with the Société des Fils de la Liberté, a paramilitary organization on November 6, 1837. A series of battles took place in the countryside around Montreal and the British crushed the initial rebellion, capturing many and forcing others, including Louis-Joseph Papineau to flee to the United States. The British burned many farms and placed the colony under martial law.

From the United States a second campaign was planned. Groups of Frères Chasseurs were established all over the province to set up an underground military organization. On November 4, 1838, Robert Nelson, one of the leaders of the Frères Chasseurs, declared the independence of Lower Canada at Napierville with himself as head of the provisional government before a crowd of 1,000.

Though the area of Beauharnois did not participate in the rebellion in 1837, it had been readied during the summer of 1838 and was ready to rise after the harvest. Led by Joson Dumochelle, a farmer who was a member of the Frères Chasseurs, a force of 400 men marched on a manor house owned by the British Member of Parliament Edward Ellice and seized it from his wife on November 3. On November 4, the group detained and disabled the steamboat Henry Brougham when it docked at Beauharnois. The Ellice manor house and the steamboat were looted, with the owners left with promissory notes by the Patriotes.

== Camp Baker and battle ==
Dumochelle took his force to the farm of an American landowner George Washington Baker near Sainte-Martine on November 7. There, along with those Patriotes under Doctor James Perrigo, they fortified the land where it met the Châteauguay River and the roads around the farm. Awaiting orders from Nelson, the number of Patriotes at Camp Baker grew to 800 of which three quarters were armed with guns.

On November 8, the force came under attack by Loyalist volunteers from Huntingdon. Easily repulsed, the Patriotes grew disillusioned with the movement as news of defeat elsewhere filtered into the camp. On November 10, 250 men were sent to Saint-Timothée to reinforce the Patriotes there. However, 4 miles (6.4 km) from Beauharnois, the force encountered volunteer troops. They were ordered to lay down their arms and return to their homes, which they did. The camp disbanded after news of British troops closing on their position.

== Aftermath ==
The Battle of Beauharnois took place on November 10, which the Patriotes lost, ending the rebellion. The South Glengarry Volunteers from Upper Canada and a company of the 71st Regiment took part in the Battle of Beauharnois and spent much of their time following the battle rooting out Patriotes in the region and looting and burning much of the countryside. Dumochelle fled into the woods and reportedly died of starvation there. A report of damages done to the lands around Sainte-Martine claimed 35 houses, 19 barns, 45 sheds and stables burned and 376 families pillaged for a total of $146,181 (equivalent to $4,419,691 in 2025) in damages.

108 Patriotes were brought to trial of which 99 were sentenced to death. Twelve ultimately were hanged, 58 deported to Australia, 2 banished, and 22 sent home on a bond of good behaviour. By the end of December the last of the Frères Chasseurs were disbanded.
