= Battle of Saint-Charles =

1837 conflict

Coordinates: 45°41′N 73°11′W

- Part of the Rebellions of 1837
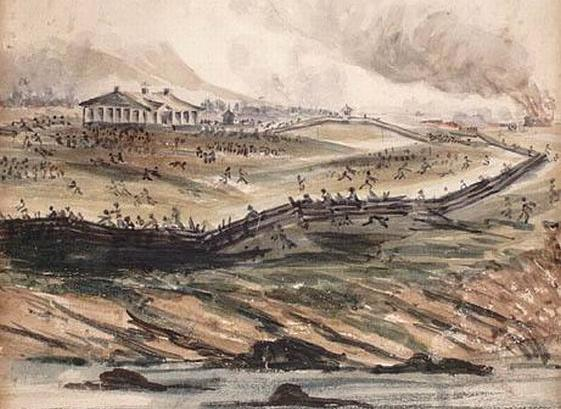
- A contemporary watercolour of the Battle of Saint-Charles depicting the rout of Brown's rebels.
Date	25 November 1837
Location	Saint-Charles, Quebec
Result	Government victory

Belligerents
United Kingdom	Patriotes

Commanders and leaders
George Wetherall	Thomas Storrow Brown

Strength
406 regular infantry 20 militia cavalry 2 cannon	200–250 men 50 rifles

Casualties and losses
3 dead 18 wounded	56 dead

The Battle of Saint-Charles was fought on 25 November 1837 between the Government of Lower Canada, supported by the United Kingdom, and Patriote rebels. Following the opening Patriote victory of the Lower Canada Rebellion at the Battle of Saint-Denis, British troops under the command of Lieutenant Colonel George Wetherall advanced from the south on the Patriote stronghold of Saint-Charles in the Richelieu valley. On 25 November 1837 they engaged the Patriote forces under the command of Thomas Storrow Brown. After a two-hour battle, the Government of Lower Canada was victorious.

== Background ==
Within twenty years of the establishment of Lower Canada in 1791, new tracts of land were set aside for settlement by peoples other than French Canadians. The French remained predominantly on the seigneuries located by rivers and the new areas were settled largely by English-speaking British immigrants. The new English-speaking immigrants reaped greater benefits than the existing French communities under the British government. Those French Canadians who were elected to the Legislative Assembly of Lower Canada were mainly of the elite educated at Catholic colleges as social movement was restricted by the British who monopolized commerce and government postings. The French Canadian habitants faced diminishing lands to give to their children and competed with the English for the new lands on English terms, with British bureaucracy placing immigrant claims ahead of those of the habitants. Furthermore, outbreaks in dysentery, typhus and cholera swept through the colony in the mid-1830s, brought by arriving immigrants. Additionally, farms in the Beauce, Chaudière and Richelieu regions (and to a lesser extent, the area around Montreal) were devastated by wheat fly, grasshopper and caterpillar infestations, reducing the food available.

Efforts by the French within the Legislative Assembly, led by Louis-Joseph Papineau, the elected leader of the Parti Patriote, to control government spending, were thwarted by the English-dominated Legislative Council of Lower Canada. Further discontent was stimulated when two journalist supporters of Papineau were arrested and jailed after disparaging the Legislative Council in their newspapers. The ensuing riot on 21 May 1832 was quashed when the garrison was called out, ending with three dead. With the parliamentary route blocked, Papineau and his allies argued for armed rebellion at an open-air meeting at Saint-Charles and published a declaration of independence. The supporters of Papineau formed para-military groups and visible support was seen in Montreal and villages to the east of the city. Sir John Colborne, commander of the military in the Canadian colonies, called out the militia and sent out warrants for arrest for suspected rebels on 16 November 1837. Papineau and other Patriote leaders fled Montreal to Saint-Denis in the Richelieu valley.

== Prelude ==
Map showing the Lake Champlain-River Richelieu watershed

=== Patriotes ===
The Patriotes were organized into civil and military wings. The military wing was commanded by Thomas Storrow Brown, a failed merchant from Montreal. The civil wing was organized into six sections, each representing a district and each of which could be armed as a battalion in the event of war. The Patriotes had two headquarters in the Richelieu valley, one in Saint-Denis and the other in Saint-Charles. The key to the defence of Saint-Charles was a brick manor house owned by the seigneur Pierre Dominique Debartzch, which was seized on 19 November. Debartzch and his family had been taken prisoner by the Patriotes who had seized the seigneury and sent the family on to Quebec City. The Patriotes, commanded by Brown at Saint-Charles, turned the house into a barracks and a guardhouse holding prisoners of the Patriotes. Around the house, the Patriotes constructed earthen breastworks made up of logs and branches covered in frozen mud and turned the area into a fortified camp. The rampart wall stretched from the river on the western flank of Saint-Charles in towards the main road, with the manor house on its eastern flank. Neither the manor house or the breastwork supported each other. Brown smashed bridges and felled trees along the road south. Saint-Charles became the centre of Patriote resistance, with hundreds flocking to the site. Brown however, only had about 50 rifles to hand out to the volunteers. Brown's total force was roughly 200–250 men within the camp or on picket duty.

=== Government ===
The government of Lower Canada was headed by the Earl of Gosford, a civilian governor general. The military was headed by Sir John Colborne, a veteran of the Peninsular War. At Colborne's disposal in Lower Canada were several British infantry regiments. At Quebec City, were the Royal Regiment, 15th, 79th, 83rd Regiments of Foot and elements of the 66th Regiment of Foot. At Montreal, the 32nd Regiment of Foot was posted and at Île aux Noix and Sorel, further elements of the 66th Regiment were garrisoned. On Saint Helen's Island in the Saint Lawrence River, elements of the Royal Artillery were posted. As events grew more unstable in the territory, Colborne ordered the Royal Regiment to Montreal. Following the riot in Montreal between Thomas Storrow Brown's Société des Fils de la Liberté and the loyalist Doric Club, Colborne ordered the 24th Regiment of Foot to deploy to Montreal from their garrisons at Toronto and Kingston, Upper Canada.

Colborne planned his attack on the Patriote headquarters from two directions. He dispatched Colonel Charles Gore with 300 infantry composed of two companies of the 24th Regiment, one 12-pounder (5.4 kg) cannon with a detachment of Royal Artillery and members of the Royal Montreal Cavalry, a militia unit. The other force would be commanded by Lieutenant-Colonel George Wetherall of the Royal Regiment leading three companies of the Royal Regiment, one company of the 66th Regiment and twenty Royal Montreal Cavalry under Captain Eléazar David and a Royal Artillery detachment led by Captain John Glasgow and two 6-pounder (2.7 kg) guns. Gore was to attack the rebels from the north via Sorel, while Wetherall would attack from the south via Fort Chambly. Gore was the first to engage the rebels, and was defeated at the Battle of Saint-Denis on 23 November.

== Battle ==
=== The march north ===
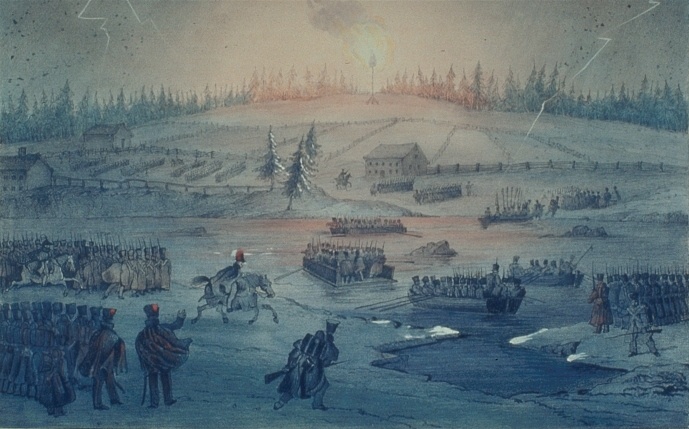
At dusk on 22 November, a force under Lieutenant Colonel George Wetherall crossed the Richelieu River, beginning their march north.

On 16 November, warrants for the arrest of the leaders of the Patriotes were issued by Sir John Colborne and at 07:00 on 18 November, a force led by Lt. Col. Wetherall departed Fort Chambly moving north towards Saint-Charles. Wetherall's force moved towards Chambly and as the column arrived, it was met by a group of roughly forty men which scattered upon taking sight of the British. Wetherall then paused at Chambly, to await further instructions from Colborne. From 18 to 22 November, Wetherall waited at Chambly for orders and a break in the weather. At dusk on 22 November, Wetherall's force crossed the Richelieu River to its western bank and began its march north. On 23 November, Wetherall halted his force at 03:00, only moving again at daybreak as far as Saint-Hilaire before stopping again at 12:00. The force paused at Saint-Hilaire, awaiting news of the northern force. At 00:00 on 24 November, news arrived of Gore's defeat. During this time at Saint-Hilaire, Colborne had sent messengers to Wetherall ordering him to withdraw, but both messengers were intercepted by the Patriotes. After receiving the news of the defeat, Wetherall sent a messenger back to Fort Chambly ordering his reserve of one grenadier company of the Royal Regiment to join him. To speed their travel, the company floated down the Richelieu River on scows. Wetherall remained at Saint-Hilaire until 25 November after his reinforcements arrived. Then, at 09:00, the column began marching north again. Wetherall's total force at this time was 406 regular infantry, 20 militia cavalry and 2 cannon.

On 24 November, Brown at Saint-Charles received offers from Wolfred Nelson, the victorious Patriote commander at the Battle of Saint-Denis and from Élisee Mailhot and Cyrille Côté, commanders of the large Patriote force at Saint-Mathias-sur-Richelieu. Nelson offered Brown 300 men and two cannon. Mailhot and Côté offered reinforcements. Brown turned down both offers, believing himself capable of defying the British with the forces he had.

=== Arrival at Saint-Charles ===
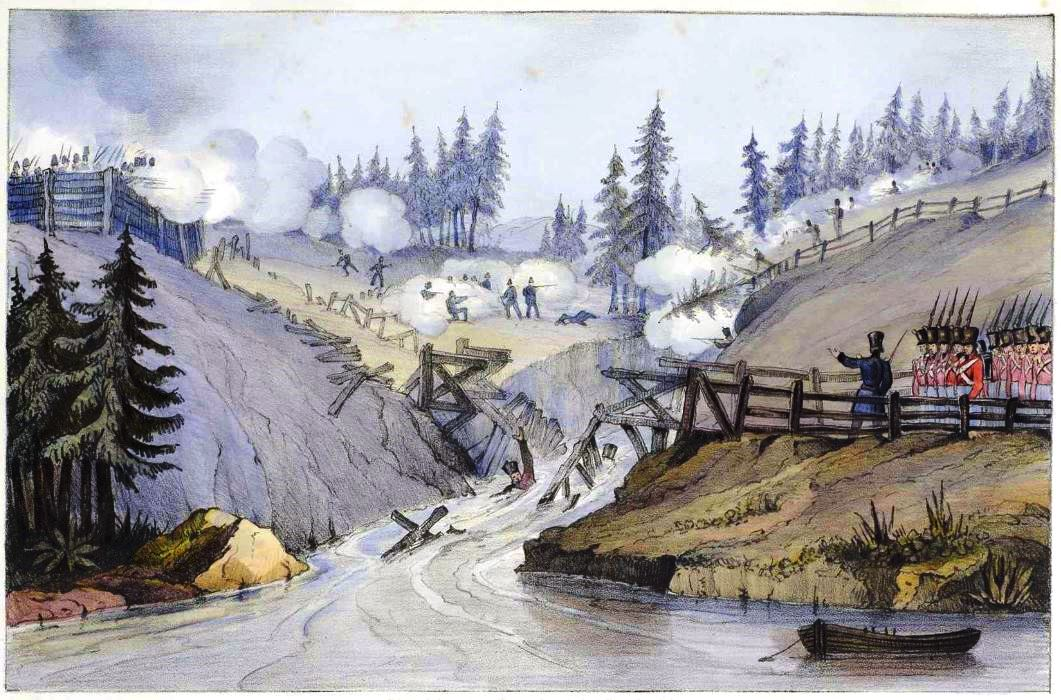
As Lieutenant Colonel Wetherall marched his forces north towards Saint-Charles, he encounters smashed bridges and small arms fire from Patriotes.

As Wetherall marched north, he encountered smashed bridges and Patriotes firing upon him from both sides of the Richelieu River as the road neared the shoreline. At 13:00, the column came under fire for the first time from roadside houses and barns. These skirmishers, under the command of Bonaventure Viger, were deployed on both sides of the streams along the road, as well as the woods and buildings along the road. Meanwhile, Brown had constructed rail fences roughly 250 metres (820 ft) south of Debartzch manor house. The Patriote picket fire wounded one Royal Regiment soldier, leading Wetherall to order the burning of the houses and barns along the road. As Wetherall continued north, the pickets retreated back to the fortified camp at Saint-Charles.

Upon reaching Saint-Charles Wetherall deployed his troops with his two cannon out front. Brown, on the other hand, had not developed a competent command structure and was unaware of the arrival of Wetherall's force. The lack of a competent Patriote command structure forced Brown to oversee everything and at the time of Wetherall's arrival was reported to have been "attending the baking of bread" and "arranging food to be taken to the camp." Brown only became aware of Wetherall's arrival when one of the cannon fired a ball that struck the steeple of the church in Saint-Charles.

Wetherall changed the disposition of his forces when he reached Brown's barricades. He placed his cannon slightly east of the road. A small unit was left to the west of the guns, and the rest was moved east of the gun position. Brown ordered a group of his men under the command of Henri-Alphonse Gauvin to a position behind a wood fence 100 metres (330 ft) south of the fortified camp that had a ditch below it. From there, the group was able to fire upon Wetherall's advance force. At this point, Wetherall offered terms to Brown, where he would not harm anyone if he was allowed to just pass through. Brown replied that he would allow Wetherall to pass only if the infantry laid down their arms. However, the response took too long to return and Wetherall ordered his forces to begin their assault.

=== Assault ===
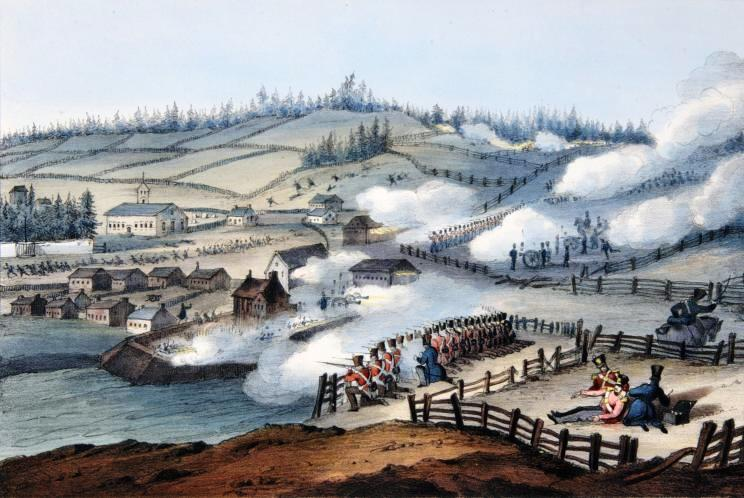
Lieutenant Colonel Wetherall's forces engaged Patriotes at Saint-Charles.

As Gauvin's Patriotes fired on Wetherall's advance force, Captain John Glasgow's guns fired grapeshot and canister shot in reply. Brown was unhorsed by the cannon fire, and once back in the saddle, fled for Saint-Denis. Wetherall's infantry were ordered to move forward to the wooden fence. The Patriotes defensive fire forced the British infantry to lie down for protection. The Patriotes then retreated back to the breastworks. Wetherall's infantry moved forward to secure the abandoned Patriote position at the fence. As Wetherall's units east of the road exchanged fire with the Patriotes, the small unit west of the road moved to seize a hill that dominated both the breastworks and the manor house. Within fifteen minutes of the opening shots, the hill had been taken and the guns re-situated there, able to fire directly into the Patriote positions below.

A party of Patriotes under Rodolphe Desrivières had been ordered to the rear to stop the civilians from fleeing. Desrivières had circled around the British right flank and began firing on the infantry at the fence from the woods. The British infantry attempted to storm Desrivières' position but were forced back to the fence. During this action, Wetherall's horse was shot from underneath him. Two other officers had their horses shot from beneath them.

After two hours, Wetherall ordered his three central companies to fix bayonets and attack the fortified camp directly. As they charged the breastworks, they made short work of the abatis that the Patriotes had constructed, being only 1 metre (3.3 ft) high. The three companies of the Royal Regiment broke through Patriote defences at the breastworks and entered the camp. By the end of the fighting, at least 56 Patriotes lay dead and more wounded and captured while the British suffered 3 dead and 18 wounded.

== Aftermath ==
Following the battle, Wetherall had all the buildings of the fortified camp burned with the exception of the Debartzch manor house. Twenty-five Patriotes were captured and imprisoned in the church at Saint-Charles. Brown, upon reaching Saint-Denis, was relieved of his command by the victor at the Battle of Saint-Denis, Wolfred Nelson. Wetherall remained at Saint-Charles until 27 November. His force then began the march south, dispersing an attack at the Chambly ferry on 28 November. On 30 November, Wetherall arrived at Montreal with 30 Patriote prisoners. Colonel Gore would return to Saint-Denis in early December to find the town abandoned by the Patriotes.

Following the defeat at Saint-Charles, the 1,000-strong Patriote force at Saint-Mathias melted away. Nelson attempted to fortify Saint-Denis, but seeing failing support, departed with his lieutenants for the United States. The Patriotes suffered a second major defeat at Saint-Eustache which ended the uprising in December 1837. The government troops summarily executed some Patriotes captured at the battles, others that were captured were imprisoned awaiting their fate. Government troops burned several houses and set one entire village on fire following the battles.

Some Patriotes which had managed to escape the defeats fled to the United States where they re-mustered under new leadership. They would return with better arms the following year and in November 1838, the rebellion would erupt again. Government troops would return and defeat the Patriotes in a series of battles. Government troops would again burn entire areas, along with pillaging and raping. Of the prisoners captured in the rebellion, 25 were hanged and 58 were deported to penal colonies in Australia.

== Sources ==
- Fryer, Mary Beacock (1986). Battlefields of Canada. Toronto: Dundurn Press. ISBN 1-55002-007-2.
- Gott, Richard (2011). Britain's Empire: Resistance, Repression and Revolt. London: Verso. ISBN 978-1-84467-892-1.
- Greenwood, F. Murray & Wright, Barry, eds. (2002). Canadian State Trials: Rebellion and Invasion in the Canadas 1837–1839. Vol. II. Toronto: University of Toronto Press. ISBN 0-8020-3748-8.
- Greer, Allan (1993). The Patriots and the People: The Rebellion of 1837 in Rural Lower Canada. Toronto: University of Toronto Press. ISBN 0-8020-6930-4.
- Ouellet, Fernand (1980). Lower Canada 1791–1840: Social Change and Nationalism. Translated by Patricia Claxton. Toronto: McClelland and Stewart. ISBN 0-7710-6921-9.
- Schull, Joseph (1971). Rebellion: The Rising in French Canada 1837. Toronto: MacMillan of Canada. ISBN 0-77157-402-9.
