= Talbot Mercer Papineau =

Canadian Army officer

Major Talbot Mercer Papineau MC
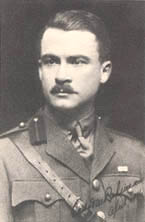
- Born: 25 March 1883; Montebello, Quebec
- Died: 30 October 1917 (aged 34); Passchendaele salient, Belgium
- Relatives: Amédée Papineau - grandfather Louis-Joseph Papineau – great grandfather
- Military career
- Allegiance: Canada; Britain
- Branch: Canadian Expeditionary Force
- Service years: 1914–1917
- Rank: Major
- Unit: Princess Patricia's Canadian Light Infantry
- Conflicts: First World War: Western Front; Battle of Passchendaele; Second Battle of Passchendaele †
- Awards: Military Cross

Major Talbot Mercer Papineau MC (25 March 1883 – 30 October 1917) was a Canadian lawyer and military officer from Quebec.

== Life and career ==
Born in Montebello, Quebec, he was the son of Louis-Joseph Papineau and great-grandson of Patriote leader Louis-Joseph Papineau. His mother, Caroline Rogers, was from an affluent Philadelphia family. Bilingual in French and English, he was raised primarily speaking English and in his mother's Protestant faith. He was educated at the High School of Montreal and at McGill University. In 1905, he was one of the first Canadians to receive a Rhodes Scholarship, and subsequently studied law at Brasenose College, Oxford. He also played ice hockey for the Oxford Canadians. Returning to Montreal in 1908, he started practising law.

In August 1914, he enlisted with Princess Patricia's Canadian Light Infantry and was commissioned a lieutenant. Through an exchange in newspapers in 1916 he argued with his cousin, the anti-imperialist nationalist leader Henri Bourassa, over support for the war and the British Empire. Papineau's letter to Bourassa would eventually be published in The Times of London. He was awarded the Military Cross for his actions in Belgium and he eventually rose to the rank of major.

He was hit by a shell and killed during the Battle of Passchendaele near Ypres on October 30, 1917. His body was never identified, and he is commemorated at the Ypres (Menin Gate) Memorial.

In 1937 his mother presented an award in his honour to be presented annually by the Debating Union of his alma mater, McGill University.

He was one of four Canadians featured in the book Tapestry of War: A Private View of Canadians in the Great War, by Sandra Gwyn.

Major Papineau was portrayed by his fifth cousin, twice removed, then future Canadian Prime Minister Justin Trudeau, in the Canadian Broadcasting Corporation's telefilm, The Great War. Trudeau starred in the two-part CBC miniseries, an account of Canada's participation in the First World War, in which Papineau was killed during the Battle of Passchendaele.
