= Amédée Papineau =

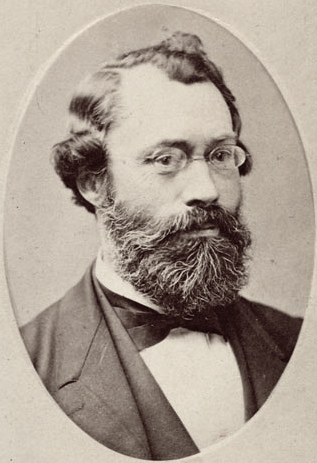
- Born: Louis-Joseph-Amédée Papineau; July 26, 1819; Montreal, Lower Canada
- Died: November 23, 1909; Montebello, Quebec, Canada
- Occupations: Writer, political and lawyer
- Known for: Participation in Rebellions of 1837, founder of the Société des Fils de la Liberté

Louis-Joseph-Amédée Papineau, or Amédée Papineau (1819–1903) was a writer and Québecois patriot and present at the meeting at which the Société des Fils de la Liberté was founded. He was the eldest son of Louis-Joseph Papineau, a leader in the Rebellion of 1837 in Lower Canada, and was involved in the rebellion himself. His father was forced to flee, and Amédée followed him to Saratoga Springs, New York. Between 1837 and 1842, he drew up the first four books of his personal journal as Journal d'un Fils de la Liberté in which he chronicled the events of the 1837 rebellion and his life in exile.

In 1846 Amédée married Mary Eleanor Westcott in Saratoga Springs. After her death in 1890, he converted from Catholicism to Presbyterianism, and in 1896 married Martha Jane Iona Curren. She was 25. Both marriages produced children.

He is the grandfather of Major Talbot Mercer Papineau and the uncle of the journalist Henri Bourassa, the founder of the newspaper Le Devoir.

== Bibliography ==
- Journal d'un Fils de la Liberté (1838-1855). Sillery, Septentrion, 1998, 957 p.

(Rough translation : journal of a son of liberty(1838-1855).

- Souvenirs de jeunesse (1822-1837). Sillery, Septentrion, 1998, 134 p.

(Rough translation : Childhood memories (1822-1837)

- Lettres d'un voyageur. D'Édimbourg à Naples en 1870-1871. . Québec, Éditions Nota bene, 2002, 416 p.

(Rough translation :letters of a traveler. From Edinburgh to Naples.)

- Aubin, Georges et Renée Blanchet, Amédée Papineau, correspondance 1831-1841, tome I. Montréal, Éditions Michel Brûlé, 2009, 543 p.

(Rough translation :Amédée Papineau Correspondence tom 1 :1831-1841)

- Aubin, Georges et Renée Blanchet, Amédée Papineau, correspondance 1842-1846, tome II. Montréal, Éditions Michel Brûlé, 2010, 471 p.

(Rough translation :Amédée Papineau Correspondence tom 2 :1842-1846)
