= Storrow =

Storrow is a surname. Notable people with the surname include:

- Helen Storrow (1864–1944), American philanthropist, early Girl Scout leader, and chair of WAGGGS for eight years
- James J. Storrow (1864–1926), Boston-area investment banker instrumental in forming General Motors, and its third president
- Thomas Storrow Brown (1803–1888), journalist, writer, orator, and revolutionary in Lower Canada (present-day Quebec)

== See also ==
- Storrow Drive
