= Patrick Laperle =

Canadian racing driver (born 1976)

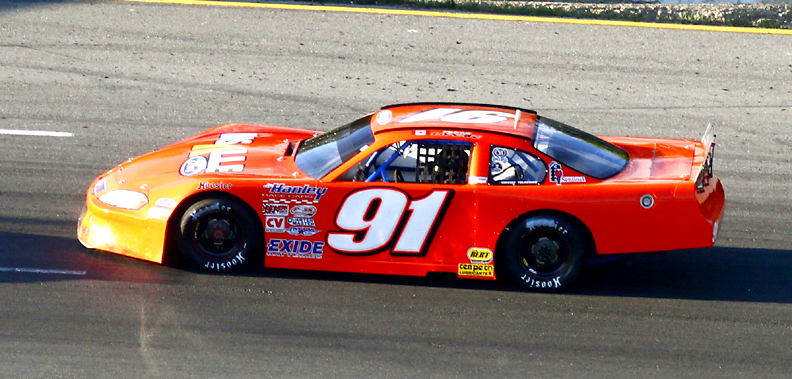
- Laperle at Autodrome Chaudière in 2013.
- Nationality: (Canada) Canadian
- Born: February 24, 1976 (age 50) Saint-Denis-sur-Richelieu, Quebec, Canada

Série ACT, PASS North career
- Debut season: 1999
- Car number: 91

Patrick Laperle (born February 24, 1976, in Saint-Denis-sur-Richelieu, Quebec, Canada) is a Canadian racing driver. He competes in the Série ACT and in the PASS North Series. He is considered one of the best stock car drivers in Quebec.

Three times champion of Quebec's ACT Series in 2007, 2011 and 2012, he also won the championship of the US-based ACT Tour in 2008.

He won 18 races in the Quebec's ACT Series and 18 races in the US-based ACT Tour. He also won three races in the PASS North Series. Laperle is a three times winner of the "Milk Bowl" race at Thunder Road International Speedbowl in Vermont in 2005, 2007 and 2008.
