= Battle of Saint Charles =

Battle of Saint Charles may refer to:

- Battle of Saint-Charles (25 November 1837), British defeat Canadian rebels in present-day Saint-Charles, Quebec
- Battle of St. Charles (17 June 1862), a battle of the U.S. Civil War in St. Charles, Arkansas
