= Étienne Chartier =

Canadian priest (1798–1853)

Étienne Chartier (26 December 1798 – 6 July 1853) was a many faceted Roman Catholic priest from Lower Canada whose family had a long association with anti-British sentiments including supporting the Americans during the siege of Quebec. His political beliefs were made apparent by his association with the Patriote movement.
