= The Great War (2007 film) =

- Written by: Brian McKenna
- Directed by: Brian McKenna
- Starring: Justin Trudeau; Maxime Cournoyer; Michael Rudder; Arthur Holden
- Music by: Lance Neveu
- Country of origin: Canada
- Original languages: English; French

Production
- Producers: Natalie Dubois; Stephen Phizicky; Janet Torge
- Editors: Michael Bulter; Susan Shanks
- Running time: 240 minutes

Original release
- Release: April 2007

The Great War is a CBC television film documenting Canadian participation in the First World War. The film stars writer-director and award-winning documentarian Brian McKenna, Michael Rudder, and future Canadian Prime Minister Justin Trudeau — who became the official Liberal candidate for the Papineau, Quebec in April 2007 — portraying his fifth cousin, twice removed, Major Talbot Papineau. The film aired in two parts on Canadian television during the 90th Anniversary of the Vimy Ridge battle, on April 8 and 9, 2007.

The CBC website included the following notice seeking people to participate in the making of the film:

Did your great-grandfather take Vimy Ridge? Did he play a part in the three-month battle at Passchendaele? Did he break through the German line at Amiens? For a landmark film to mark the 90th anniversary of the First World War, the CBC is recruiting 300 descendants of those who went to war between 1914 and 1918. The descendants will walk in the footsteps of their ancestors and take part in massive battle recreations.
