= Rebellions of 1837–1838 =

Canadian reformers' rebellion against the British Canadian government

- Part of the Atlantic Revolutions
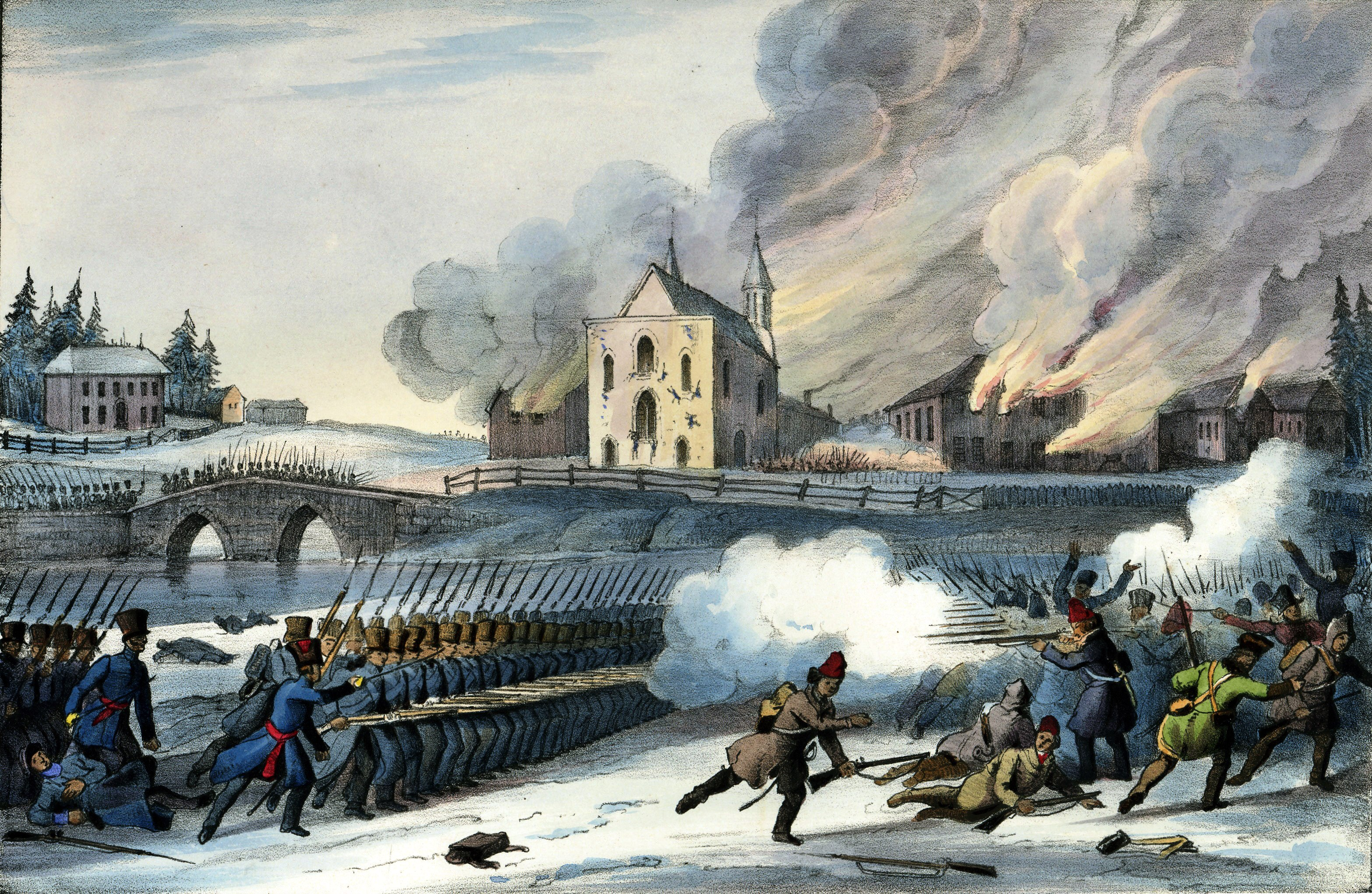
- The Battle of Saint-Eustache, Lower Canada
Date	7 December 1837 – 4 December 1838 (11 months, 3 weeks and 6 days)
Location	Canada
Result	Colonial government victory; Patriote rebellion crushed by loyalist forces; Republic of Canada dismantled; Defeat of Hunters' Lodges; Unification of Upper and Lower Canada into the Province of Canada

Belligerents
Lower Canada; Château Clique	Patriotes; Republic of Lower Canada
Upper Canada; Family Compact	Reform movement Republic of Canada; Hunters' Lodges

Commanders and leaders
John Colborne, 1st Baron Seaton; Francis Bond Head; James FitzGibbon; George Gurnett; Henry Dundas; Allan MacNab; Charles Stephen Gore; George Augustus Wetherall	Louis Joseph Papineau; William Lyon Mackenzie; Thomas Storrow Brown; Jean-Olivier Chénier †; Robert Nelson; Wolfred Nelson; Ferdinand-Alphonse Oklowski; Anthony Van Egmond; Cyrille-Hector-Octave Côté; Charles Duncombe; Nils von Schoultz (executed)

The Rebellions of 1837–1838 (French: Rébellions de 1837) were two armed uprisings that took place in Lower and Upper Canada in 1837 and 1838. Both rebellions were motivated by frustrations with lack of political reform. A key shared goal was responsible government, which was eventually achieved in the incidents' aftermath. The rebellions led directly to Lord Durham's Report on the Affairs of British North America and to the Act of Union 1840 which joined the two colonies into the Province of Canada. The report and subsequent developments eventually led to the Constitution Act, 1867, which created the contemporary country of Canada and its government.

The Lower Canada Rebellion was more widespread and was more brutally suppressed. After the Upper Canada Rebellion was suppressed, fighting continued sporadically for months. Many of the rebels fled to the United States. Rebel leader William Lyon Mackenzie established a short-lived "Republic of Canada" on Navy Island in the Niagara River but withdrew from armed conflict soon thereafter.

Charles Duncombe and Robert Nelson helped establish a militia mostly composed of American radicals, the Hunters' Lodge/Frères chasseurs. Those two groups held a convention in Cleveland in September 1838 to declare another Republic of Lower Canada. The Hunters' Lodges drew on the Americans in the radical Equal Rights Party (or "Locofocos"). This organization launched the "Patriot War", which governments of the Upper and Lower Canadas suppressed with the help of the U.S. government. The raids ended when the rebels and Hunters were defeated at the decisive Battle of Windsor, almost a year after the Patriot's first defeat at Navy Island.

== Atlantic context ==
Some historians contend that the rebellions in 1837 ought to be viewed in the wider context of the late-18th- and early-19th-century Atlantic Revolutions. The American Revolutionary War of 1775–83, the French Revolution of 1789–99, the Haitian Revolution of 1791–1804, the Irish Rebellion of 1798 and the rebellions in Spanish America in 1810–25 were inspired by republican ideals, but whether the rebels would have gone so far as to usurp the Crown remains a subject for historical debate. Great Britain's Chartists sought the same democratic goals. Ducharme (2006) puts the rebellion in 1837 in the context of the Atlantic Revolutions. He argues that Canadian reformers took their inspiration from the republicanism of the American Revolution. The rebels believed that the right of citizens to participate in the political process through the election of representatives was the most important right, and they sought to make the legislative council elective rather than appointed. Rebellion in Upper Canada (and Lower Canada also) broke out after the 1836 Legislative Assembly elections were corrupted. It seemed then that the reformers' struggles could only be settled outside the framework of existing colonial institutions. The British military crushed the rebellions, ending any possibility the two Canadas would become republics. Some historians see ties to the Chartist Newport Uprising of 1839 in Wales, suppressed by Sir Francis Bond Head's cousin, Sir Edmund Walker Head.

Historians have tended to view the two Canadian rebellions and the subsequent US Patriot War in isolation, without reference to each other, and without reference to the republican impetus they shared. Recent reconsiderations have emphasized that this was a purposeful forgetfulness by the Reformers after the Rebellions, as they attempted to repudiate the bold republicanism of William Lyon Mackenzie, yet steer an acceptable course to national independence under the guise of responsible government.

== Comparisons ==
=== Similarities ===
The constitutions of Upper and Lower Canada differed greatly but shared a basis on the principle of "mixed monarchy"—a balance of monarchy, aristocracy and democracy. The colonies, however, lacked the aristocratic element and found their non-elective Legislative Councils dominated by local oligarchies that controlled local trade and the institutions of state and religion. In Lower Canada they were known as the Château Clique; in Upper Canada they were known as the Family Compact. Both office-holding oligarchies were affiliated with more broadly based "Tory parties" and opposed by a Reform opposition that demanded a radically more democratic government than existed in either colony.

The Reformers viewed the governments in both provinces as illegitimate. In Lower Canada, acute conflict between an elected body (the Legislative Assembly) and appointed elements of the government (especially in the Legislative Council) brought all legislation to a halt, leaving the Tories to impose Lord John Russell's Ten Resolutions. This allowed the Tories to rule without accountability to electors.

In Upper Canada, the 1836 elections had been marred by political violence and fraud organized by Lieutenant Governor Francis Bond Head. Reformers William Lyon Mackenzie and Samuel Lount had lost their seats. The Tories passed a bill that allowed them to continue to sit in disregard of the established practice of dissolving the House on the death of a monarch (William IV died in June 1837).

In the midst of this crisis of legitimacy, the Atlantic economy went into recession, with the greatest impact being on farmers. Farmers barely survived widespread crop failures in 1836–37 and were facing lawsuits from merchants trying to collect old debts. The collapse of the international financial system imperiled trade and local banks, leaving many in abject poverty.

In response, Reformers in each province organized radical democratic "political unions". The Political Union movement in Britain was largely credited with the passing of the Great Reform Bill of 1832. In Lower Canada, "Patriots" organized the Société des Fils de la Liberté ("Sons of Liberty"). Mackenzie helped organize the Toronto Political Union in July 1837. Both organizations became the vehicles for politically organizing protests, and eventually rebellion. As the situation in Lower Canada approached crisis the British concentrated their troops there, making it apparent that they planned on using armed force against the Patriots. With no troops left in Upper Canada, an opportunity for a sympathetic revolt was opened.

=== Differences ===
Since the time of Lord Durham's Report on the Rebellions, the Lower Canada Rebellion has been attributed to tensions between the British and the French, that the conflict was "'racial' and, as a consequence, it was sharper than–indeed fundamentally different from—the milder strife that disturbed 'English' Upper Canada." Despite being true, this interpretation understates the republicanism of the Patriots.

The populace widely supported the Lower Canada Rebellion due to economic and political subordination of the French Canadians. Discontent had resulted in mass actions (boycotts, strikes and sabotage) over many years. The government responded harshly, such as the restriction of civil liberties. Government troops and armed militias were concentrated in Lower Canada to deal with the crisis. They burned entire villages, and imprisoned or exiled hundreds of activists.

By contrast, the Upper Canada Rebellion was less widespread and was not as broadly supported by local populations. It was quickly quelled by relatively few pro-government militias and armed volunteer soldiers and was less brutally suppressed by comparison.

== Aftermath ==
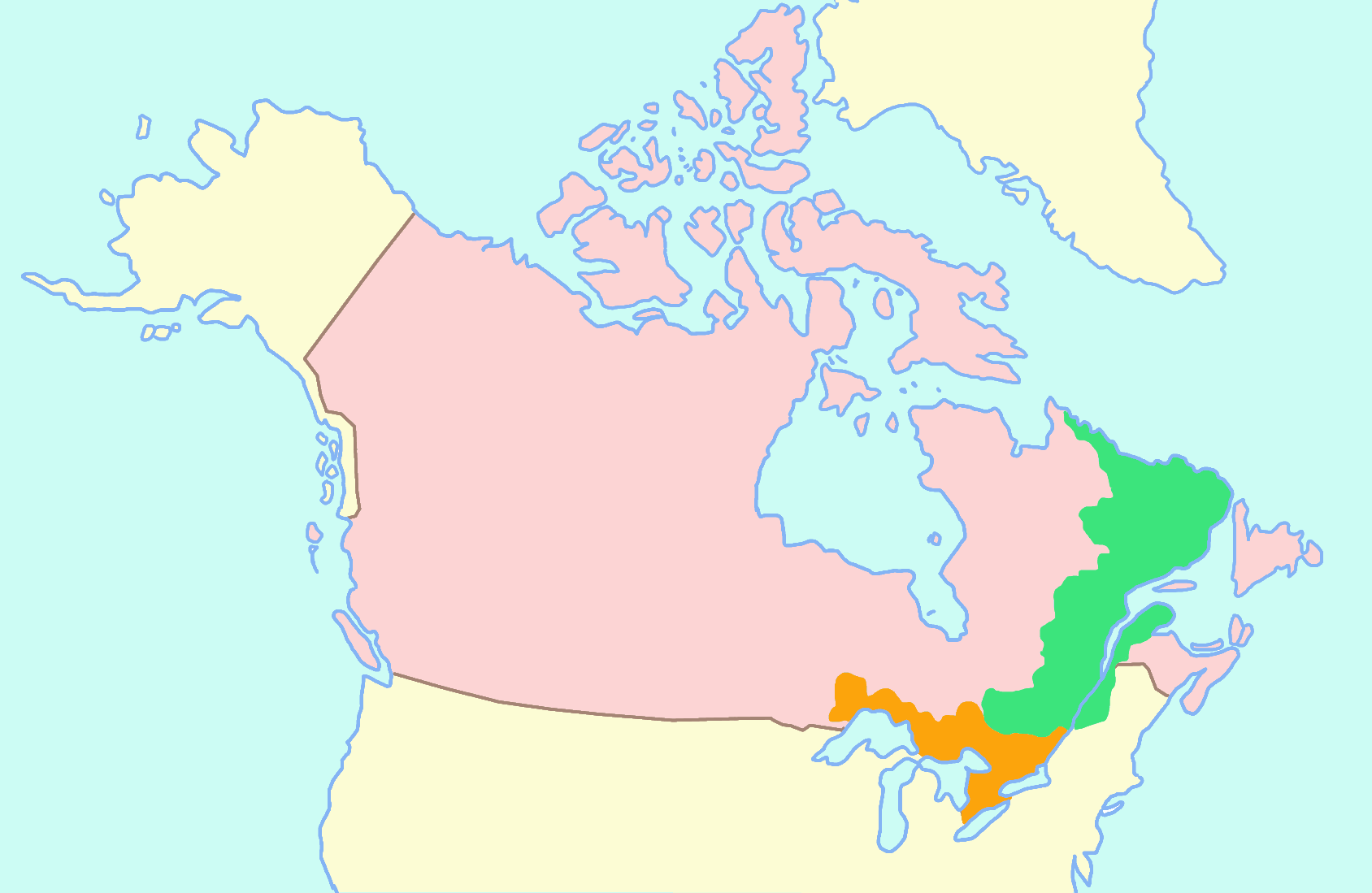
Map of Lower Canada (green) and Upper Canada (orange). Shortly after the rebellions, the Canadas were united under the Act of Union 1840 to form the Province of Canada

Rebels who were arrested in Upper Canada following the uprisings were put on trial, and most were found guilty of insurrection against the Crown. A hundred Canadian rebels and U.S. sympathizers were sentenced to life in Britain's Australian prison colonies. Samuel Lount, Peter Matthews and others were publicly hanged in Toronto. The public hangings took place in Court House Square, in between Toronto's new jail and courthouse. The Foreman of Public Works, Joseph Sheard, was expected to share in the work of building the scaffold for Lount's and Matthews' execution. However, he claimed the men had done nothing that he would not have, and he refused to assist. The Orange militia stood guard during the execution to deter a rescue.

The root cause of resentment in Upper Canada was not so much against distant rulers in Britain, but rather against the corruption and injustice of the Family Compact. The convictions of the rebels were not due to the authorities seeing their views being aligned with the liberalism of the US and thus offending the Tory values of the Canadian colonies.

Rather, as revealed in the ruling of Chief Justice Sir John Robinson, a Lockean justification was given for the prisoners' condemnation, and not a Burkean one: the Crown, as protector of the lives, liberty and prosperity of its subjects, could "legitimately demand allegiance to its authority." Robinson said that those who preferred republicanism over monarchism were free to emigrate, and thus the participants in the uprisings were guilty of treason.

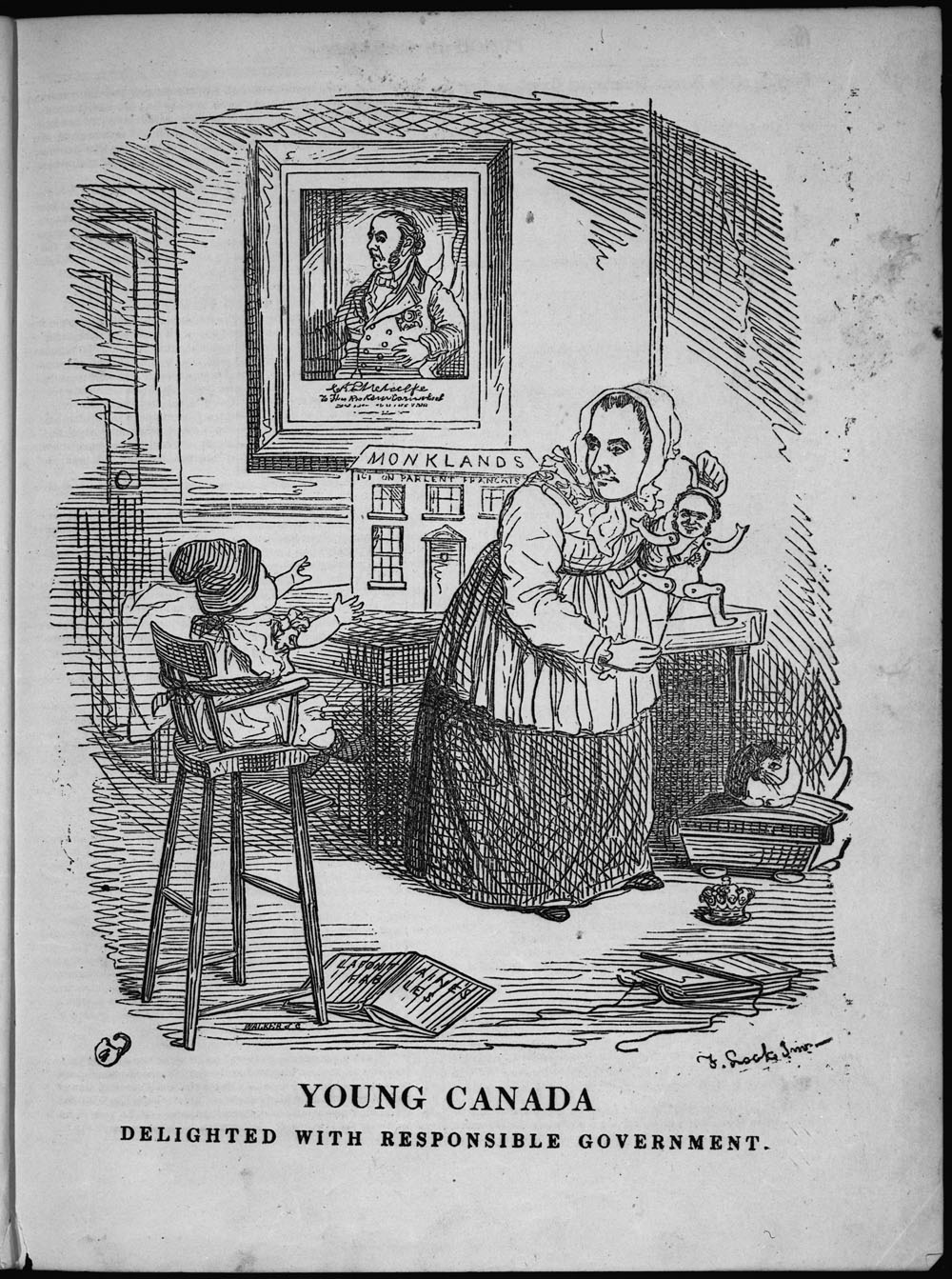
A Punch political cartoon depicts a baby Canada "delighted with responsible government", 1849. The establishment of responsible government was recommended in a report on the rebellions.

After the rebellions were suppressed, Robert Baldwin, Louis-Hippolyte Lafontaine and other moderate reformers gained credibility as an alternative voice to the radicals. They were influential when the British government sent Lord Durham, a prominent reformer, to investigate the cause of the troubles. Among the recommendations in his report was the establishment of responsible government for the colonies, one of the rebels' original demands (although it was not achieved until 1849). Durham also recommended the merging of Upper and Lower Canada into a single political unit, the Province of Canada (established through the Act of Union 1840), which became the nucleus for modern-day Canada. More controversially, he recommended the government-sponsored cultural assimilation of French Canadians to the English language and culture. Durham intended the merging of the Upper and Lower Canada to be a way to take any form of self-government away from the French Canadians and make them a smaller part of a new larger political unit.

In geopolitical terms, the Rebellions and the subsequent Patriot War altered the landscape of relations between Britain and British colonial authorities on one hand, and the U.S. government on the other. They all were dedicated to a peace policy due to a budding financial crisis and to a sense of perceived disadvantage which both felt. Both were concerned about the disruption in relations which radical ideas might cause through further rebellion and raids. An unprecedented level of cooperation occurred in diplomatic and military circles and the Rebellions were not seen as entirely domestic events. The administration of U.S. president Martin Van Buren implemented mitigating measures on US soil to prevent escalation. As they evolved into the Patriot War, the Rebellions contributed to the construction of more cooperative Anglo-American and Canada–US relations.

== Legacy ==
In 1937, one century after the rebellions, the names of William Mackenzie and Louis-Joseph Papineau were applied to the Mackenzie–Papineau Battalion or the Mac-Paps, a battalion of officially unrecognised Canadian volunteers who fought on the Republican side in Spain during the Spanish Civil War. In memory of their heritage, the group fought to the rallying cry "The Spirit of 1837 lives on!"

== See also ==
- American Revolution
- History of Canada
- List of incidents of civil unrest in Canada
- Military history of Canada
