= Jérôme Demers =

Jérôme Demers (August 1, 1774 – May 17, 1853) was a Québécois Roman Catholic priest, author, architect, educator, and ecclesiastical administrator. He was perhaps best known as a teacher of philosophy (along with literature, architecture, and science) at the Séminaire de Québec, where he taught for more than fifty years. His Institutiones Philosophicae ad Usum Studiosae Juventutis appeared in 1835 and was the first Canadian textbook of philosophy. Louis-Joseph Papineau was among his students.

He also exercised a strong influence in the field of architecture. A building that is part of the Musée de l'Amérique française now bears his name.
