= Daniel Tracey =

Lower Canada doctor, journalist and politician (1794–1832)

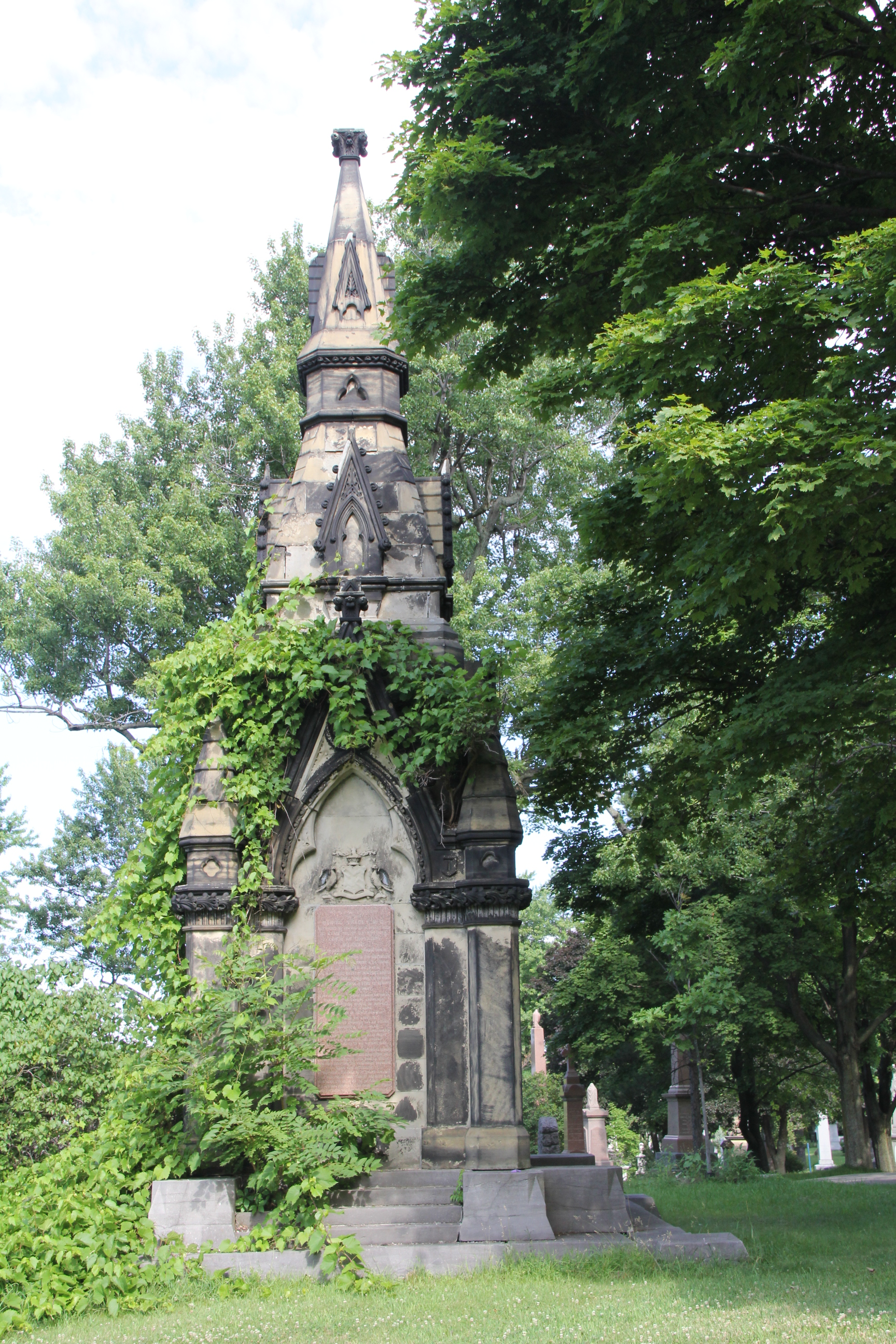
Tracey's grave in Montreal

Daniel Tracey (September 1, 1794 – July 18, 1832) born in Roscrea, Tipperary County, Ireland, was a medical doctor, journalist and politician in Lower Canada (now Quebec).

He arrived in the Province of Lower Canada with his younger siblings in 1825. Though he had trained as a doctor in Dublin, he was never registered to practise in Lower Canada.

== The Vindicator ==
In 1828, he began publishing the Irish Vindicator and Canada General Advertiser, known simply as the Irish Vindicator. Based in Montreal the newspaper aimed at the immigrant Irish community soon took a dissenting view of the non-elected but powerful, autocratic Family Compact, known in Lower Canada as the Château Clique and advocated the enrichment of the democratic rights for the majority of its citizens, most of whom were Catholics. The paper also promoted Daniel O’Connell and Louis-Joseph Papineau.

Tracey was one of several journalists imprisoned early in 1832 for criticizing the non-elected legislative council that represented the interests of the Château Clique. Tracey, editor of the Vindicator and Ludger Duvernay, the editor of the French language La Minerve newspaper were arrested for libel and imprisoned together for over a month for writing articles that said that "it is certain that before long all of America must be republican." They were released after much public support and condemnation of the arrests.

== Political career ==
In the spring of 1832, he was elected as a member of the Legislative Assembly of Lower Canada. At the vote counting station supporters of the opponent candidate, Stanley Bagg (supported by the Clique) triggered a violent confrontation. As a result, three of Tracey's supporters were killed and many more were wounded.

== Death ==
Despite his rising political stature he died suddenly in July, 1832 becoming a victim of the widespread cholera outbreak that summer in Montreal. After his death, Edmund Bailey O'Callaghan took over as editor of the Vindicator.

== Family ==
After the death of his parents in Ireland, Tracey became guardian of his three younger siblings. He had studied at Trinity College Dublin and, having also earned a medical degree in Dublin, was practising medicine in King's County, Ireland. After the accidental drowning death of one of his brothers, Tracey decided to move his family to Canada.

After his death, his sister Ann married Charles Wilson, who later became mayor of Montreal. His brother John relocated to Albany, New York after the rebellions of 1837–1838, becoming a successful businessman and civic leader there. One of John's sons, Charles Tracey, became a U.S. congressman. In 1866, John Tracey donated $10,000 (£2,000) to have a large monument built over his older brother's gravesite in Montreal.
