= Declaration of Independence of Lower Canada =

1838 declaration of independence of Quebec

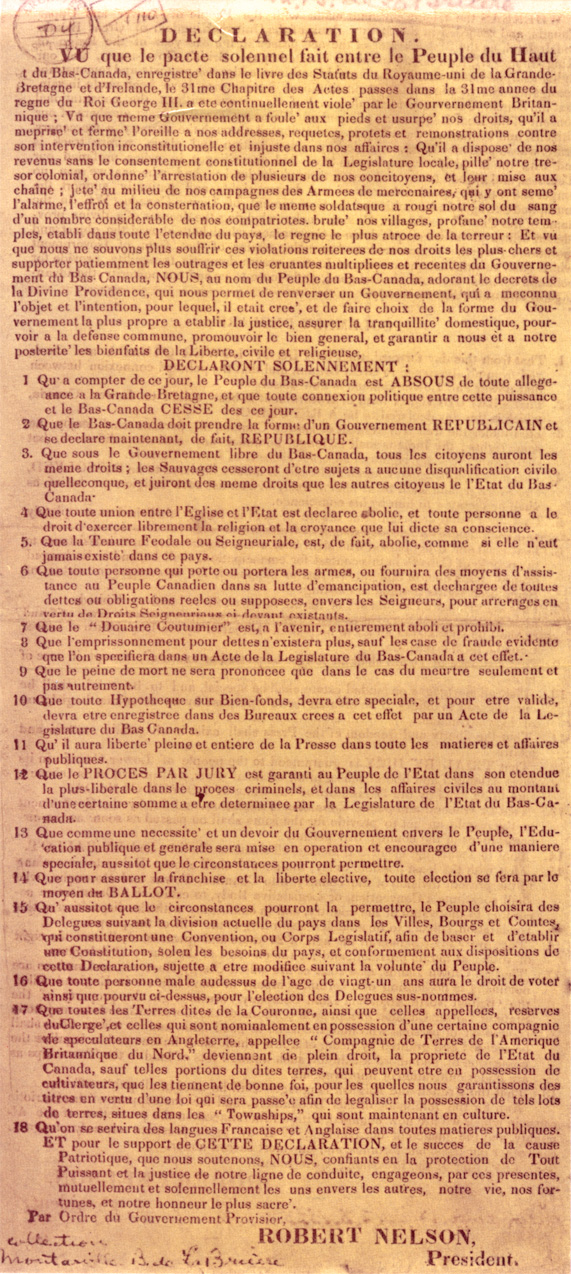
The declaration, in French

The Declaration of Independence of Lower Canada (French: Déclaration d'indépendance du Bas-Canada) was a document written by the patriote rebel Robert Nelson on February 22, 1838, while in exile in the United States, after the first rebellion of 1837.

Written in French, the 1838 declaration was primarily inspired by the 1776 United States Declaration of Independence and the 1789 Declaration of the Rights of Man and of the Citizen, but it also included some other political ideas that were popular in the 19th century. The movement for the independence of Lower Canada (today Quebec) ultimately failed, as it did not result in the creation of an independent nation-state.

== Excerpt ==
... whereas we can no longer suffer the repeated violations of our most dearest rights, and patiently support the advanced outrages and cruelties of the Government of Lower Canada,

WE, in the name of the people of Lower Canada, acknowledging the decrees of a Divine Providence, which permits us to put down a Government, which hath abused the object and intention for which it was created, and to make choice of that form of Government which shall re-establish the empire of justice — assure domestic tranquility — provide for common defense — promote general good, and secure to us and our posterity the advantages of civil and religious liberty,

SOLEMNLY DECLARE:—

1. That from this day forward, the PEOPLE OF LOWER CANADA are absolved from all allegiance to Great Britain, and that the political connection between that Power and Lower Canada, is now disbanded.
2. That a REPUBLICAN form of Government is best suited to Lower Canada, which is this day declared to be a REPUBLIC.
3. That under the Free Government of Lower Canada, all persons shall enjoy the same rights: the Indians shall no longer be under any civil disqualification, but shall enjoy the same rights as all other citizens in Lower Canada.

== See also ==
- Lower Canada Rebellion
- History of Quebec
- Timeline of Quebec history
