= Saint-Denis-sur-Richelieu =

- Municipality
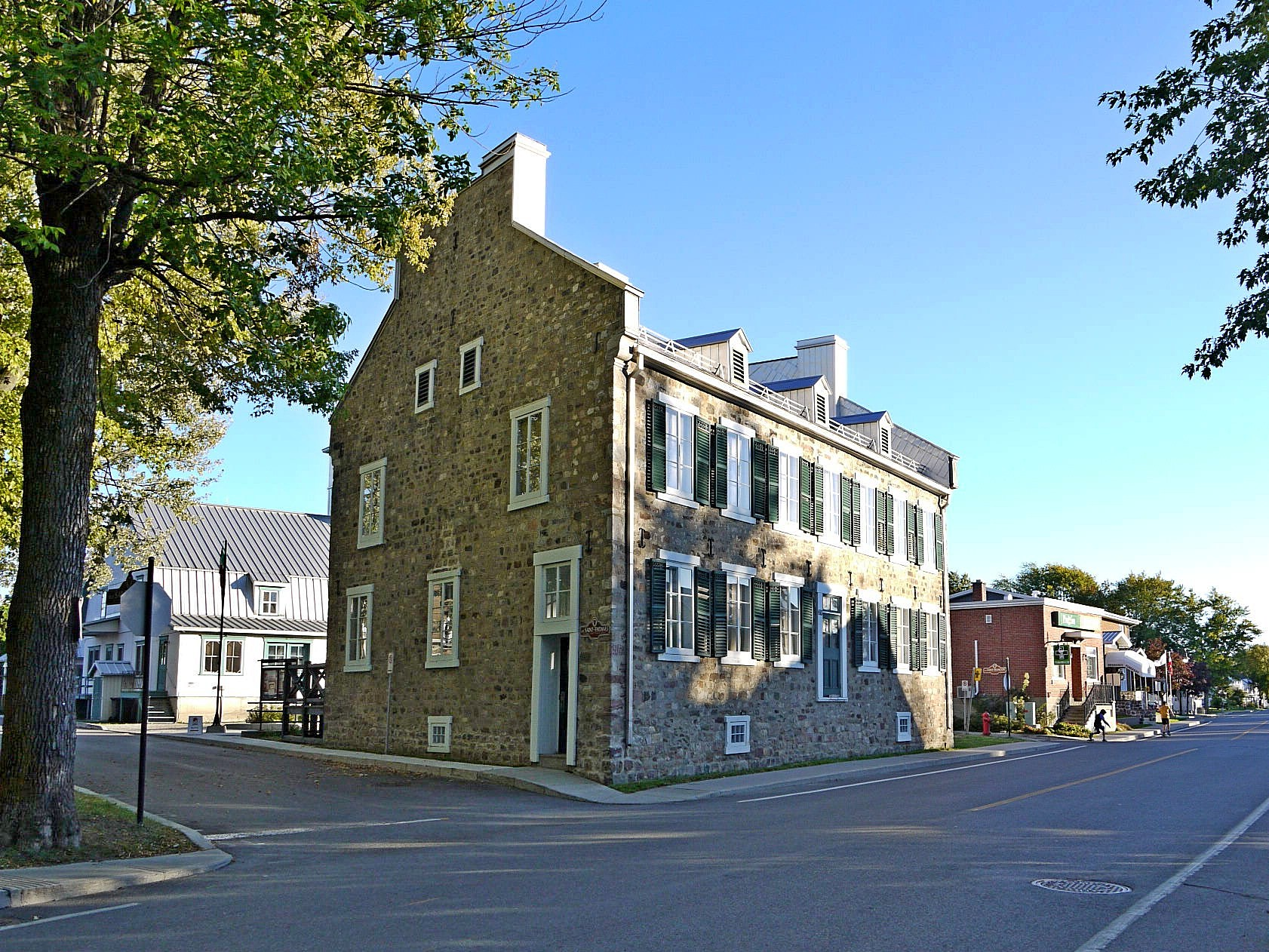
- Jean-Baptiste Masse House

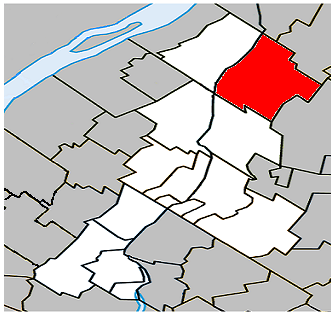
- Location within La Vallée-du-Richelieu RCM

- Location in southern Quebec
- Coordinates: 45°47′N 73°09′W
- Country: Canada
- Province: Quebec
- Region: Montérégie
- RCM: La Vallée-du-Richelieu
- Settled: 1694
- Constituted: December 24, 1997

Government
  - Mayor: Pierre-Luc Archambault
  - Federal riding: Pierre-Boucher—Les Patriotes—Verchères
  - Prov. riding: Borduas

Area
  - Municipality: 86.40 km^{2} (33.36 sq mi)
  - Land: 84.64 km^{2} (32.68 sq mi)
  - Urban: 1.07 km^{2} (0.41 sq mi)

Population (2021)
  - Municipality: 2,339
  - Density: 27.6/km^{2} (71/sq mi)
  - Urban: 1,048
  - Urban density: 978.1/km^{2} (2,533/sq mi)
  - Pop 2016-2021: ▲1.3%
  - Dwellings: 1,045
- Time zone: UTC−5 (EST)
  - Summer (DST): UTC−4 (EDT)
- Postal code(s): J0H 1K0
- Area codes: 450 and 579
- Highways: R-133; R-137
- Website: www.stdenis surrichelieu.ca

Saint-Denis-sur-Richelieu (French pronunciation: [sɛ̃ dəni syʁ ʁiʃ(ə)ljø], lit. 'Saint-Denis on Richelieu') is a municipality in the southwestern part of Quebec, Canada on the Richelieu River in the Regional County Municipality of La Vallée-du-Richelieu. The population as of the Canada 2021 Census was 2,339.

== History ==
In 1694, King Louis XIV granted the Seigneurie of Saint-Denis to the aristocratic French Army officer, Louis-François De Gannes, sieur de Falaise of Buxeuil, Vienne, France. He named his seigniory after his wife, Barbe Denys.

A great stone Roman Catholic Saint-Denis Church was completed in 1796.

On November 23, 1837, Saint-Denis-sur-Richelieu was the site of the murder of British courier, Lieutenant George Weir by Patriotes. Subsequently, the Patriotes, calling themselves The Sons of Liberty based on the American model, won a battle here against the British Army that marked the official beginning of the Lower Canada Rebellion. Today, Saint-Denis-sur-Richelieu has a museum called the Maison nationale des Patriotes, an interpretation centre that presents a history of the Patriotes movement that was led by the villager's most famous resident, Wolfred Nelson.

On October 21s 2012, a monument to the memory of Louis-Joseph Papineau was unveiled in a park next to City Hall, along the river, by Québec Premiere Pauline Marois.

== Demographics ==
=== Population ===
Population trend:

Census	Population	Change (%)
2021	2,339	▲1.3%
2016	2,308	▲1.0%
2011	2,285	▲1.9%
2006	2,243	▲2.7%
2001	2,183	N/A

=== Language ===
Mother tongue language (2021)

Language	Population	Pct (%)
French only	2,255	96.4%
English only	25	1.1%
Both English and French	25	1.1%
Other languages	35	1.5%

== See also ==
- List of municipalities in Quebec
- Battle of Saint-Denis (1837)
