= Edmund Bailey O'Callaghan =

Lower Canada politician, physician and journalist

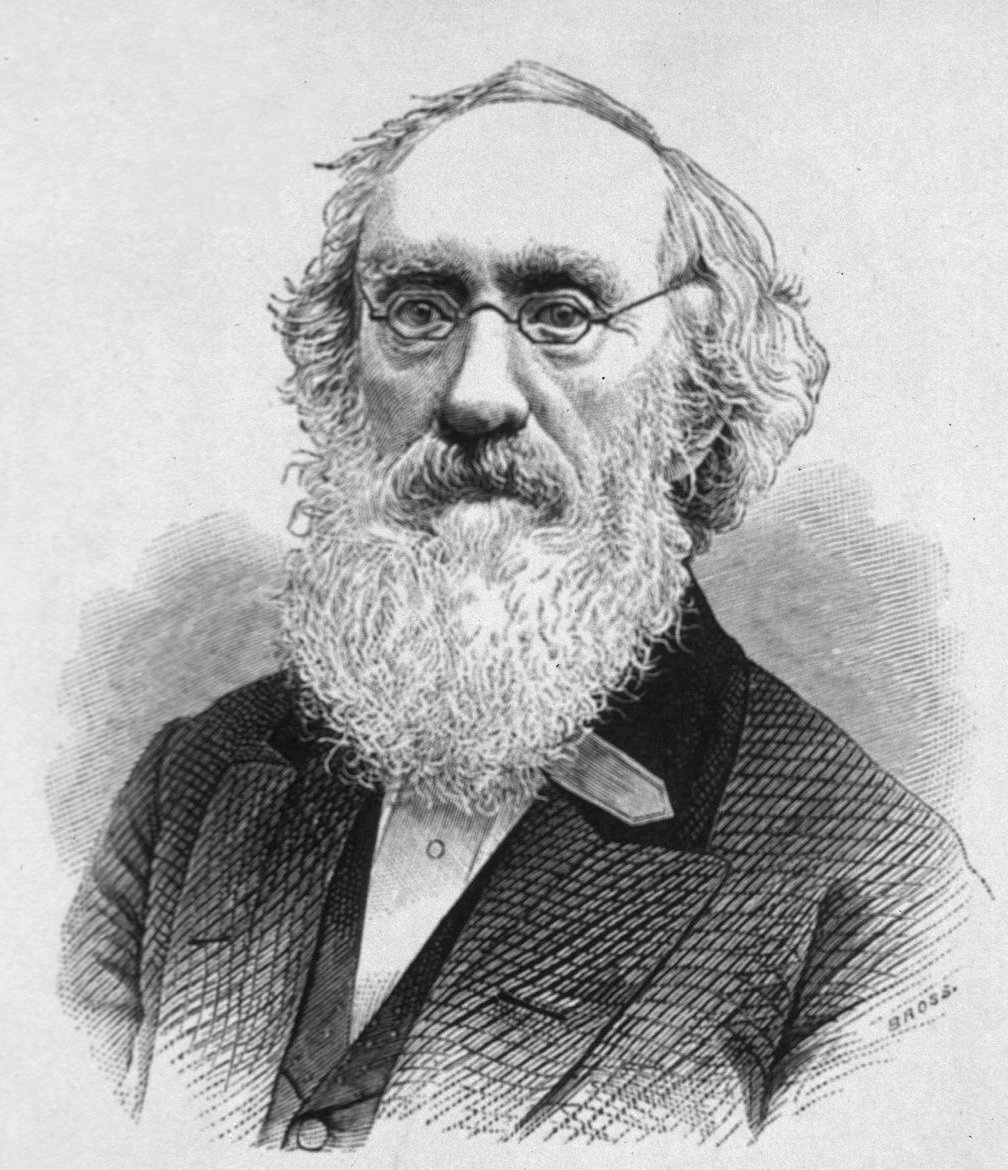
- Edmund Bailey O'Callaghan
- Born: 27 February 1797; Mallow, Ireland
- Died: 29 May 1880 (aged 83); New York City, New York
- Occupations: doctor, journalist, member of provincial parliament, secretary-archivist

Edmund Bailey O'Callaghan, (probably 27 February 1797 – 29 May 1880) was an Irish medical doctor, historian and journalist.

== Career ==
Born in Mallow, County Cork, Ireland, he studied medicine in Paris and immigrated to Lower Canada in 1823 where he became involved in the political reform movement of the Parti patriote. He was registered to practice medicine in Lower Canada on 16 October 1827.

On the death of Daniel Tracey, owner of the Montreal Vindicator newspaper, in 1832 O'Callaghan became the editor and brought in Thomas Storrow Brown to work on the paper. They proved to be an irreducible adversary of Lord Gosford and the status quo. In 1834, O'Callaghan was elected to the Legislative Assembly of Lower Canada for Yamaska. In office, he was a close supporter of Louis Joseph Papineau.

In 1837, during the Lower Canada Rebellion, a mandate of arrest was issued against him, and he sought refuge at Saint-Denis, then crossed the United States border with his friend, Louis-Joseph Papineau. Later, O'Callaghan became secretary-archivist of the State of New York, and died there in 1880.

== Works ==
- A Biographical Sketch of the Hon. Louis Joseph Papineau, Speaker of the House of Assembly of Lower Canada. 1838. Printed at the Sentinel office in Saratoga Springs, New York (online). OCLC 890967329 (all editions).
- History of New Netherland; or New York Under the Dutch. D. Appleton & Company (publisher). 9 November 2021. LCCN 66-25099, LCCN 01-27967, LCCN 16-8170; OCLC 321026748 (all editions).
1. 1846: Vol. 1 (1st ed.) – via Google Books (UC San Diego).
2. 1848: Vol. 2 (1st ed.) – via Google Books (UC Riverside).
3. 1855: Vol. 1 (2nd ed.) – via Google Books (University of Michigan).
4. 1855: Vol. 2 (2nd ed.) – via Google Books (Stanford).
- Jesuit Relations of Discoveries and Other Occurrences in Canada and the Northern and Western States of the Union, 1632–1672, New York, 1847
- Laws and Ordinances of New Netherland, 1638–1674 – Compiled and Translated From the Original Dutch Records in the Office of the Secretary of State, Albany, N.Y. Albany: Weed, Parsons and Company. 1868 – via Google Books (Harvard University).
- A list of Editions of the Holy Scriptures, and Parts Thereof, Printed in America Previous to 1860, Albany, 1861.
- The Register of New Netherland; 1626 to 1674, Albany, 1865.

== See also ==
- Timeline of Quebec history
- Lower Canada
