= Doric Club =

Canadian paramilitary organization

The Doric Club was an association of Loyals set up in Lower Canada by Adam Thom, a lawyer and journalist, in March 1836. A noted opponent of the Patriotes, the group was both a social club and a paramilitary organization. It was used as the armed faction of the Constitutional Party and many of its members took part in the Lower Canada Rebellions of 1837 and 1838 on the British side.

== History ==
The members of the club were mostly young anglophone radicals who had been forced to leave the British Rifle Corps after its dissolution by Lord Gosford in January 1836. Gosford affirmed that British subjects were not in danger, being adequately protected by the army, and that such groupings were useless. Believing them to be about 2,000 in number, he judged them to be troublemakers.

On March 16, 1836, the Club published its manifesto, calling all loyal British men to unite against what it had called the "French domination" in Lower Canada. "If we are deserted by the British government and the British people, rather than submit to the degradation of being subject of a French-Canadian republic, we are determined by our own right arms to work out our deliverance", read the document.

Despite the opposition of Lord Gosford, the Doric Club was tolerated by General John Colborne, as were many other Loyal armed groups. On November 6, 1837, after an assembly of the Société des fils de la liberté, a group of young Patriote supporters, a violent skirmish erupted between the latter and the club. Finally, during the Lower Canada Rebellions, Colborne recruited several of its members as volunteers to quell the rebels.

== See also ==
- History of Quebec
- Quebec nationalism
- Quebec independence
