= Patriote movement =

Early 19th-century political movement in Lower Canada (present-day Quebec)

Flag used by the Patriotes between 1832 and 1838

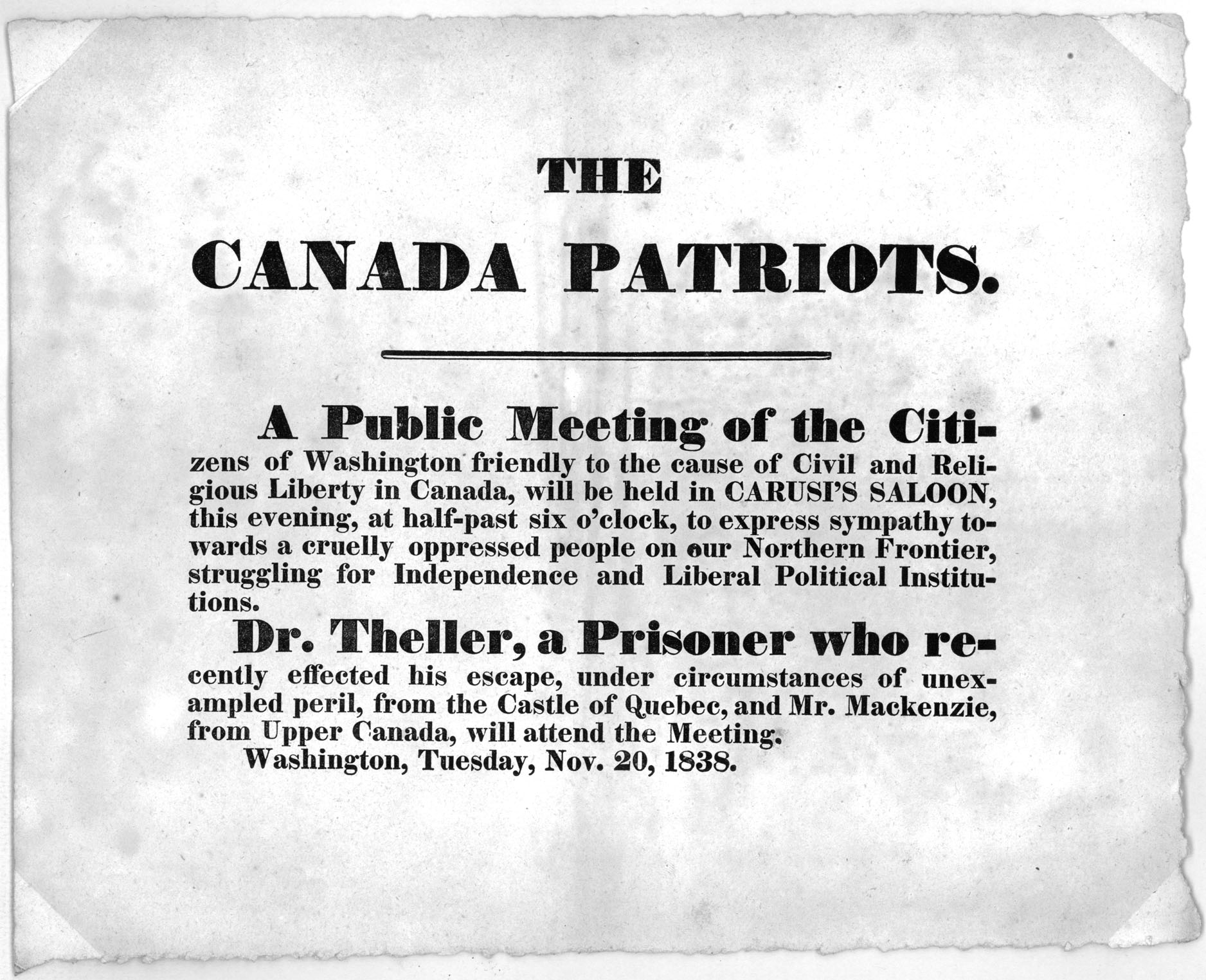
Canadian patriot support pamphlet

The patriotes movement was a political tendency that existed in Lower Canada (present-day Quebec) from the turn of the 19th century to the Patriote Rebellion of 1837 and 1838 and the subsequent Act of Union of 1840. The partisan embodiment of the movement was the Parti patriote, which held many seats in the Legislative Assembly of Lower Canada (the elected lower house of the Lower Canadian parliament).

The movement was at once a liberal and republican reaction against colonial control of the government of Lower Canada, and a more general nationalistic reaction against British presence and domination over what had previously been an exclusively French settler colony. It was inspired by the American Revolution, the decolonization of the Americas, as well as the political philosophy of classical liberalism and republicanism. Among its leading figures were François Blanchet, Pierre-Stanislas Bédard, John Neilson, Jean-Thomas Taschereau, James Stuart, Louis Bourdages, Denis-Benjamin Viger, Daniel Tracey, Edmund Bailey O'Callaghan, Andrew Stuart, Wolfred Nelson, Robert Nelson, Thomas Storrow Brown, François Jalbert and Louis-Joseph Papineau. Its ideals were conveyed through the newspapers the Montreal Vindicator, Le Canadien, and La Minerve.

The patriotes demanded democratic reforms, such as an elected Legislative Council, as opposed to the contemporary council whose members were appointed for life by the British Crown. The Parti patriote also sought to place control of the colony's budget in the hands of the elected assembly, thus supporting Lower Canada's position as semi-autonomous within the Empire. In 1834, Louis-Joseph Papineau drafted the Ninety-Two Resolutions to United Kingdom to obtain these and other aims. The Resolutions were in great part denied by the Russell Resolutions, which resulted in a radicalization of the Patriotes and their moving closer to demands of outright independence and a Lower Canada republic. Many of its followers ended up taking part in an armed insurrection known as the Lower Canada Rebellion, which was put down by the British army and its volunteer militia.

== See also ==
- Étienne Chartier
- Declaration of Independence of Lower Canada
- February 15, 1839
- Québécois
- History of Quebec
- Patriot War
- Quebec independence movement
- Société des Fils de la Liberté
- Timeline of Quebec history
- Upper Canada Rebellion
