= Thomas Storrow Brown =

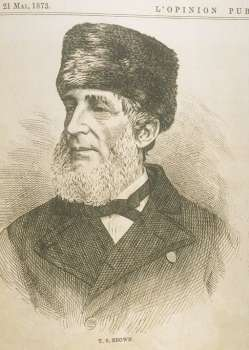
- Thomas Storrow Brown in L'opinion publique, Vol. 4, no. 21, p. 245 (21 May 1873)
- Born: July 7, 1803; St. Andrews, New Brunswick
- Died: November 26, 1888 (aged 85); Montreal, Quebec
- Occupations: journalist, writer

Thomas Storrow Brown (July 7, 1803 – November 26, 1888) was a Canadian journalist, writer, orator, and revolutionary in Lower Canada (present-day Quebec).

== Biography ==
Born in St. Andrews, New Brunswick, the son of Henry Barlow Brown and Rebecca Appleton, as a young man in 1818 he moved to Montreal, Lower Canada. Once there, he found work and with his savings eventually went into the hardware business. His operation encountered financial difficulties and closed leaving Brown to find other employment.

A member of the Unitarian Church, Thomas Brown was an advocate for both social and political reform, supporting the concept of responsible government in which the members of the Legislative Council of Quebec would be appointed by the Legislative Assembly's majority party. Brown also worked to improve social conditions through aid to the poor. Influenced by the republican form of government in the United States, over time his frustrations with the government of Great Britain saw him join the Montreal Vindicator newspaper in 1832 at the invitation of his friend Edmund Bailey O'Callaghan. Following the death of founder Daniel Tracey, O'Callaghan had been appointed the paper's new editor and with Brown, they continued to espouse the former owner's radical views. Their attacks were especially harsh against the Governor of the Colony, Lord Gosford despite the fact that he had ordered the dissolution of the British Rifle Corps in January 1836.

In 1833, Brown's wife, Jane Hughes, died. By this time, Brown had moved firmly from a moderate who sought to reform the political system, to a radical wanting to fundamentally alter Canadian society. In 1837 he participated in the Lower Canada Rebellion and was head of the military faction of the rebel group, the Société des Fils de la Liberté, that openly advocating revolution. In November, Brown was wounded and partially blinded in one eye during the street fight between the Société des Fils de la Liberté and the Doric Club but nevertheless, in December he still fought against government forces at the Battle of Saint-Charles. Defeated, he escaped to the United States where he worked as a journalist in Florida. In 1844, he was granted an amnesty and returned to Montreal where Charles Wilson gave him a job in his hardware store. Brown married Hester Livingston in 1860 and a little more than a year later was given administrative posts in the government. Thomas Storrow Brown died at his home in Montreal in 1888 at the age of eighty-five.

== Works ==
- Address of the Fils de la liberté of Montreal to the young people of the colonies of North America, 1837 (online)
- A History of the Grand Trunk Railway of Canada compiled from public documents, 1864
- "My Escape in 1837", in New Dominion Monthly, 1869
- "Brief Sketch of the Life and Times of the late Hon. Louis Joseph Papineau", in New Dominion Monthly, 1872
- The Rebellion of 1837; Interesting reminiscences; Progress of events; The Ministers sent out from England, 1873
- Strong drink: what it is, and what it does, 1884.
