= Louis-Joseph Papineau =

Lower Canada politician, lawyer, and seigneur

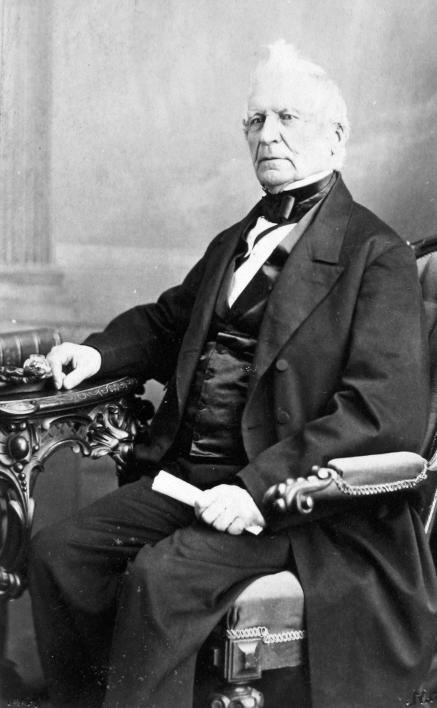
- Born: October 7, 1786; Montreal, Province of Quebec
- Died: September 23, 1871 (aged 84); Montebello, Quebec, Canada
- Occupations: Lawyer, Member of Provincial Parliament, Speaker of the House of Assembly

Louis-Joseph Papineau (French pronunciation: [lwi ʒozɛf papino]; October 7, 1786 – September 23, 1871), born in Montreal, Quebec, was a politician, lawyer, and the landlord of the seigneurie de la Petite-Nation. He led the reformist Patriote movement, organized boycotts against British imports, and then led the unsuccessful Lower Canada Rebellion of 1837–1838. He later served two terms as member of the Legislative Assembly of the Province of Canada. His father was Joseph Papineau, also a Quebec politician. Papineau was the grandfather of the journalist Henri Bourassa, founder of the newspaper Le Devoir.

== Childhood and education ==
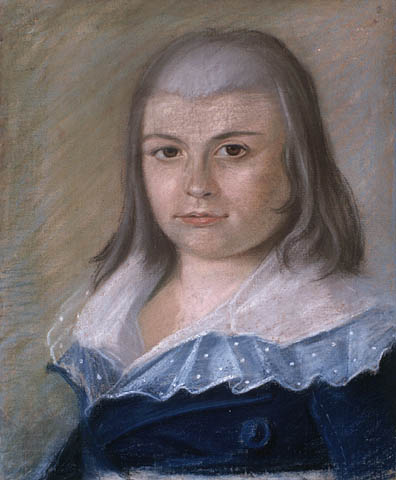
The young Louis-Joseph, 10 years old

Papineau was the eldest of eight children. He was described as an energetic child. He first studied in Montreal, at the Collège Saint-Raphaël from 1796 onwards, then at the Petit Séminaire de Québec, from 1802 to 1804. His arrival at the Petit Séminaire de Québec was highly anticipated, and his reputation preceding him. Upon graduation, he began an apprenticeship under his father with the goal of becoming a blacksmith, but this was quickly abandoned when the young Papineau turned to law, joining his cousin Denis-Benjamin Viger. Viger "was for a time the assembly's agent in London and became one of Papineau's prominent supporters and close friends, but after the rebellion, he was to follow Lafontaine."

Papineau's later childhood was mainly spent on the seigniory of la Petite Nation, located on the Ottawa river, which was purchased by his father in 1801 from the Quebec Seminary. During his time spent at the seigniory of La Petite-Nation, Papineau was sent to study at the College Saint-Raphaël in Montreal, where he rebelled and was forced to leave college. He was then sent to study at the Petit Seminaire de Québec, where he completed his secondary studies. Jérôme Demers was among his teachers.

In 1808 Papineau was elected member of parliament for Kent (now Chambly, Quebec) before being admitted to the Bar of Lower Canada in 1810. Later, he served as a militia officer in the War of 1812.

In 1822, he was sent to London with John Neilson to present a petition of 60,000 signatures against the Union project. While in the United Kingdom, he was replaced by Joseph-Rémi Vallières de Saint-Réal as Speaker.

In 1826, he was chosen leader of the Patriotes, a reformed and more radical Parti Canadien. In 1831, he sponsored a law which granted full equivalent political rights to Jews, 27 years before anywhere else in the British Empire. The events that led to Jews receiving full citizenship rights in Lower Canada in advance of other nations or territories in the British Dominion were due to the involvement of one Ezekiel Hart, a Jew who had proved his dedication to the burgeoning Canadian identity by raising money to support troops in Lower Canada to help in defence against United States invasion from the south.

Papineau was part of the committee that wrote the Ninety-Two Resolutions passed by the Legislative Assembly on February 21, 1834. The resolutions called for an elected Legislative Council and an Executive Council responsible before the house of the people's representatives.

== Speaker of the Legislative Assembly ==
Papineau was elected Speaker of the Legislative Assembly of Lower Canada on January 21, 1815. The same year, he replaced Pierre-Stanislas Bédard as leader of the Parti Canadien. Under his leadership, the party worked for the reform of Lower Canada's political institutions and strongly opposed the abuses of the appointed Legislative Council.

In 1820, he refused a position on the Legislative Council offered by governor Dalhousie.

== Leader of the Patriotes ==
Papineau giving a political speech for the "Assemblée des six-comtés".

The British government eventually responded to the 92 Resolutions by issuing ten resolutions of their own, the Russell Resolutions (named after the Home Secretary, Lord John Russell). The British government rejected all of the 92 Resolutions. After the arrival of the Russell Resolutions in Lower Canada on March 6, 1837, Papineau led the movement of protest and participated in numerous popular assemblies. He led the committee that organized the boycott of essentially all British imports to Lower Canada. On November 15, he created the Conseil des Patriotes with Edmund Bailey O'Callaghan. He and O'Callaghan fled Montreal for Saint-Denis-sur-Richelieu on November 16, after governor Lord Gosford ordered their arrest and that of 25 other Patriot leaders. Papineau and O'Callaghan went to the home of Wolfred Nelson. He crossed the United States border on November 25.

== In exile ==
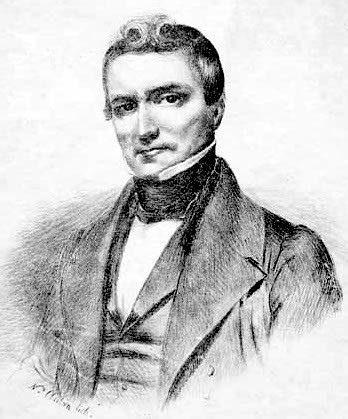
Louis-Joseph Papineau, 1840

On February 8, 1839, he departed to leave New York City for Paris where he hoped to get France involved. In May, he published the Histoire de l'insurrection du Canada (History of the insurrection in Canada) in the magazine Progrès. Despite meeting with influential politicians such as Alphonse de Lamartine and Hughes Felicité Robert de Lamennais, the France of Louis-Philippe also remained neutral. After his wife left in 1843 "he spent a large part of his leisure in the main archival repositories in Paris, where he copied documents relating to French rule in Canada".

His role in the 1837 rebellions against British rule forced him into a period of exile, during which he visited Italy and Switzerland. In 1845, three years after he was granted amnesty by the colonial government, he returned to Montreal in what was now the united Province of Canada.

== Return to politics ==
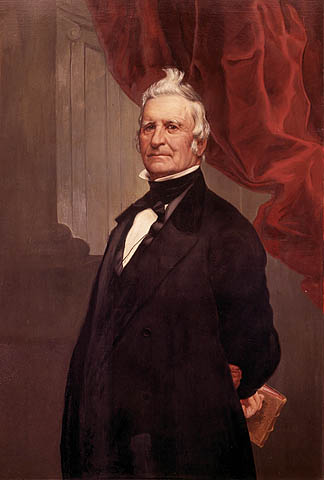
Portrait of Louis-Joseph Papineau, by Théophile Hamel.

In 1848, he was elected member of the united Legislative Assembly of the Province of Canada in the riding of Saint-Maurice. In severe disagreement with the emerging French Canadian Liberal Party, he sat as an independent member. A convinced republican after a long exile in the United States and France, Papineau supported the Montreal Annexation Manifesto that called for Canada to join the United States of America.

Papineau, along with John Molson Jr., the son of John Molson, and Horatio Gates, served as the first Vice-Presidents of the Montreal Mechanics' Institute. He participated in the creation of the Parti rouge. He was defeated in 1851 but elected in a by-election in 1852. He did not present himself again in the elections of 1854. He retired from public life and reappeared only once to hold a conference at the Institut Canadien de Montréal in December 1867.

He died at his manor in Montebello, Quebec near the modern Château Montebello on September 23, 1871.

== Memorials ==
Both Papineau's manor house in Montebello and his house in Montreal are National Historic Sites, and both are units of the national park system. The one in Montreal, designated in 1968, is closed to the public, but the Montebello property, designated in 1986, is open seasonally, from May to October. Papineau, himself, was named a National Historic Person in 1937. A federal plaque reflecting that status was finally unveiled in 2022, with plans to install it at Montebello.

On October 21, 2012, a monument to his memory was unveiled at Saint-Denis-sur-Richelieu by Quebec Premier Pauline Marois.

Papineau is commemorated by a public artwork installed in the metro station, Papineau that serves the street named for his father Joseph Papineau. The École Secondaire Louis-Joseph Papineau in Montreal was named after him.

== Family ==
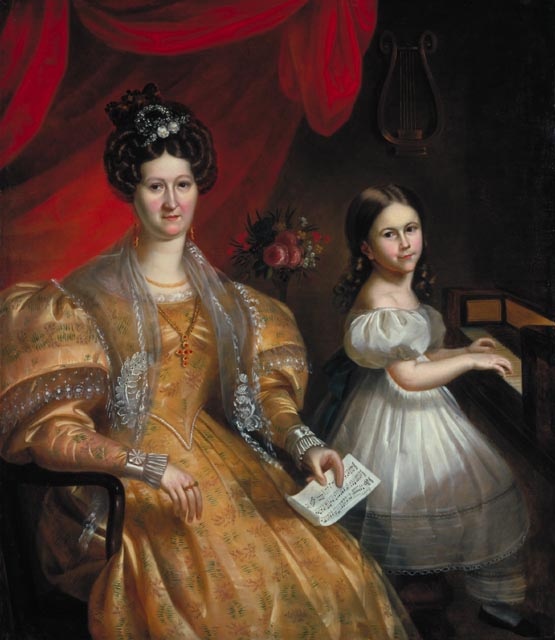
Julie and Ézilda Papineau

Papineau married Julie Bruneau in Quebec City on April 29, 1818. Together, they had nine children .

- Amédée Papineau (1819–1903)
- Didier Papineau (1820–1821);
- Lactance Papineau (1822–1862)
- Arthur Papineau (1824–1825);
- Aurelie Papineau (1826–1830);
- Ézilda Papineau (1828–1894) – had dwarfism, did not have any children and stayed all her life in Quebec;
- Gustave Papineau (1830–1851);
- Charles Papineau (1833–1834);
- Azélie Papineau (1834–1869) – married the painter and architect Napoléon Bourassa (1827–1916), mother of Henri Bourassa, a famous journalist.

== Artworks ==
=== Paintings ===
Napoléon Bourassa, Louis-Joseph Papineau, beau-père de l'artiste, 1858, 152 x 114,9 cm, Musée national des beaux-arts du Québec, Québec.

Alfred Boisseau, Louis-Joseph Papineau, 1871, Musée national des beaux-arts du Québec, Québec.

Charles Alexander Smith, L'Assemblée des six comtés à Saint-Charles-sur-Richelieu en 1837, 1891, Musée national des beaux-arts du Québec, Québec.

=== Lithography ===
Gerome Fassio, adapted from Antoine Maurin, Louis-Joseph Papineau, 1844, lithography, 37,8 x 30,7 cm, Musée national des beaux-arts du Québec, Québec.

=== Sculptures ===
Louis-Philippe Hébert, adapted from Napoléon Bourassa, Louis-Joseph Papineau, 1874, 28,8 x 14 x 11,5 cm, Musée national des beaux-arts du Québec, Québec.

Louis-Philippe Hébert, Louis-Joseph Papineau, 1887, 75 x 28 x 24 cm, Musée national des beaux-arts du Québec, Québec.

Napoléon Bourassa, Louis-Joseph Papineau, 1900, 72 x 60,4 x 13,1 cm, Musée national des beaux-arts du Québec, Québec.

Napoléon Bourassa, Louis-Joseph Papineau, 1900, 48 x 37 x 10 cm, Musée national des beaux-arts du Québec, Québec.

Napoléon Bourassa, Louis-Joseph Papineau, 1900, 48 x 37 x 10 cm, Musée national des beaux-arts du Québec, Québec.

Napoléon Bourassa, Louis-Joseph Papineau, 1900, 58 x 45,5 x 10 cm, Musée national des beaux-arts du Québec, Québec.

Napoléon Bourassa, Louis-Joseph Papineau, 1900, 58 x 45,5 x 10 cm, Musée national des beaux-arts du Québec, Québec.

Napoléon Bourassa, Louis-Joseph Papineau, 1900, 48 x 37 x 10 cm, Musée national des beaux-arts du Québec, Québec.

Napoléon Bourassa, Louis-Joseph Papineau, 1900, 47 x 36 x 10 cm, Musée national des beaux-arts du Québec, Québec.

=== Photography ===
Thomas Coffin Doane, Louis-Joseph Papineau, Daguerréotype, c. 1852, Library and Archives Canada, reference #3195235

Jules-Isaïe Benoît, dit Livernois, Louis-Joseph Papineau. Photographie d'un tableau de Théophile Hamel, 1863, Musée national des beaux-arts du Québec, Québec.

Unknown, Louis-Joseph Papineau, de l'album Eugène-Hamel, circa 1865, 9,8 x 5,1 cm and; 7,8 x 4,6 cm, Musée national des beaux-arts du Québec, Québec.

Henri-Napoléon Grenier, Louis-Joseph Papineau, de l'album de collection dit de Napoléon Garneau, 1870-1871, 10,2 x 6,3 cm; and 9,5 x 5,9 cm, Musée national des beaux-arts du Québec, Québec.

Unknown, Le Musée du manoir Papineau, à Montebello, circa 1895, 25,3 x 30,3 cm and 16,3 x 21,3 cm, Musée national des beaux-arts du Québec, Québec.

=== Photo-engraving ===
Napoléon Bourassa, Louis-Joseph Papineau, circa 1900, 13,5 x 9 cm and 38,1 x 29,2 cm, Musée national des beaux-arts du Québec, Québec.

=== Drawing ===
Jobson Paradis, La Chapelle funéraire Papineau, Montebello, circa 1900-1915, 23,4 x 28,6 cm, Musée national des beaux-arts du Québec, Québec.

== Note ==
The Art works section was copied and adapted from the French Wikipedia page of Louis-Joseph Papineau . See that page's history for attribution.

== Archives ==
There is a Papineau family collection at Library and Archives Canada. There is also a Papineau family fonds at Bibliothèque et Archives nationales du Québec.

== See also ==
- Quebec nationalism
- History of Quebec
- Timeline of Quebec history
- Denis-Benjamin Papineau
- Société des Fils de la Liberté

== Bibliography ==
- "A Chronology of the Life of Louis-Joseph Papineau". Manoir-Papineau National Historic site of Canada. Parks Canada. Archived from the original on 2005-04-15.
- Brown, Thomas Storrow (January 1872). "Brief sketch of the life and times of the late Hon. Louis-Joseph Papineau". New Dominion Monthly.
- Marsh, James H (9 February 2017). "Louis-Joseph Papineau". The Canadian Encyclopedia (online ed.). Historica Canada. Archived from the original on 2008-08-27.
- O'Callaghan, Edmund Bailey (1838). "A Biographical Sketch of the Hon. Louis Joseph Papineau, Speaker of the House of Assembly of Lower Canada". Sentinel. Saratoga Springs, NY.
- Ouellet, Fernand (1972). "Papineau, Louis-Joseph". In Hayne, David (ed.). Dictionary of Canadian Biography. Vol. X (1871–1880) (online ed.). University of Toronto Press.
- Ouellet, Fernand (1961). Louis-Joseph Papineau: A Divided Soul. Canadian Historical Association.
- Pickering Leblanc, J.-Normand (1989). Le mémorial Papineau (in French). Montréal: Éditions du Fleuve. ISBN 978-2-89372-028-9. OCLC 21447143.
- Proulx, Gustave (1973). Le Combat Magnifique: Louis-Joseph Papineau (in French). Montréal: Les Presses de "La Presse. Without ISBN

Political offices
Preceded by François Viger	MPP, District of Kent; 1809–1814	Succeeded by Noël Breux
Preceded by Étienne Nivard Saint-Dizier	MPP, District of Montreal West; 1814–1837	Succeeded by none
Preceded by François Lesieur Desaulniers, Moderate Reformer	MLA, District of Saint-Maurice; 1848–1851	Succeeded by Joseph-Édouard Turcotte, Moderate Reformer
