= Joseph Duquet =

Joseph Duquet (September 18, 1815 – December 21, 1838) was a notary in Lower Canada. He was executed for his part in the Lower Canada Rebellion.

He was born in Châteauguay, Lower Canada in 1815. He studied at the Petit Séminaire de Montréal and the Collège de Chambly. Duquet articled as a notary with Joseph-Narcisse Cardinal and then studied law with Chevalier de Lorimier. In 1837, he continued his training as a notary with his uncle Pierre-Paul Démaray at Dorchester (later Saint-Jean-sur-Richelieu). Démaray was arrested for high treason in November 1837 but was freed by a group of Patriotes while he was being escorted to the jail at Montreal. Duquet helped his uncle escape to the United States. After a skirmish at Moore's Corner, he escaped to Swanton, Vermont. In February 1838, he took part in an attempted invasion of Lower Canada by Robert Nelson.

Duquet returned to Lower Canada in July 1838 after an amnesty was proclaimed. He then helped recruit members for the frères chasseurs and organized a lodge at Châteauguay. He was captured with Joseph-Narcisse Cardinal at Kahnawake when they attempted to get weapons from the native people there. At a trial in November 1838, he was sentenced to death for the crime of high treason with a recommendation for executive clemency. He was hanged at Montreal in December 1838 and buried in the old Catholic cemetery there. In 1858, his remains were moved to the Notre Dame des Neiges Cemetery and buried under a monument dedicated to the Patriotes of 1837–8.

== See also ==
- Kahnawake Iroquois and the Rebellions of 1837-38
