= History of Canada (1763–1867) =

British colonial era
- 1763–1867
French colonial era	Post-Confederation era
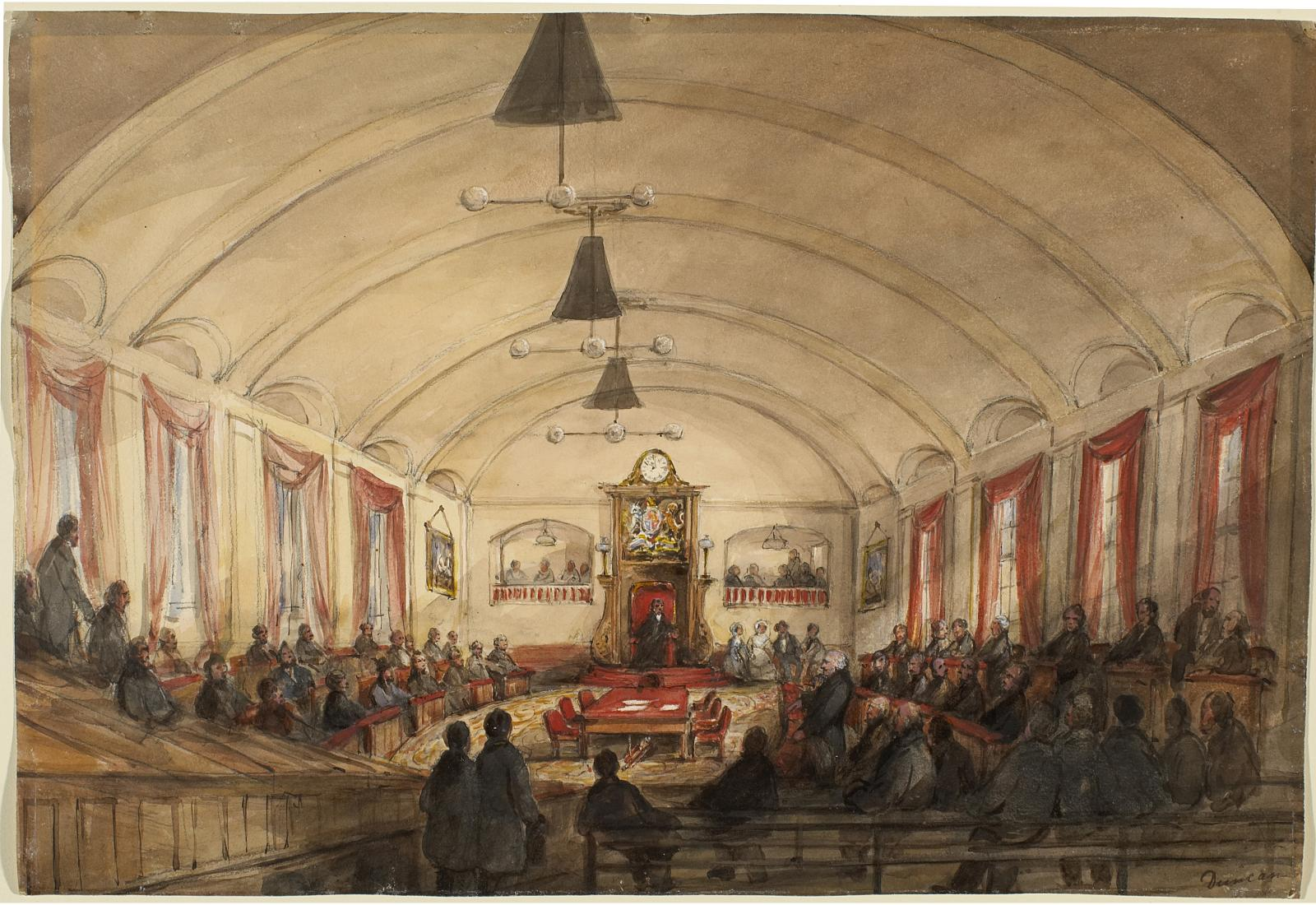
- Inside the Parliament of the Province of Canada in Montreal, 1848

Starting with the 1763 Treaty of Paris, New France, of which the colony of Canada was a part, formally became a part of the British Empire. The Royal Proclamation of 1763 enlarged the colony of Canada under the name of the Province of Quebec. The Constitutional Act 1791 split that Province of Quebec into two separate provinces, Lower Canada and Upper Canada, sometimes referred to the "Canadas". In 1841, the Union Act, 1840, Upper Canada and Lower Canada were joined to become the Province of Canada.

By the 1860s, interest developed in forming a new federation between the Canadas and the other British colonies of British North America, that led to Confederation in 1867. A number of other British colonies that are today part of Canada, such as Newfoundland and British Columbia, and large territories such as Rupert's Land, initially remained outside the newly formed federation.

== New France under British rule ==
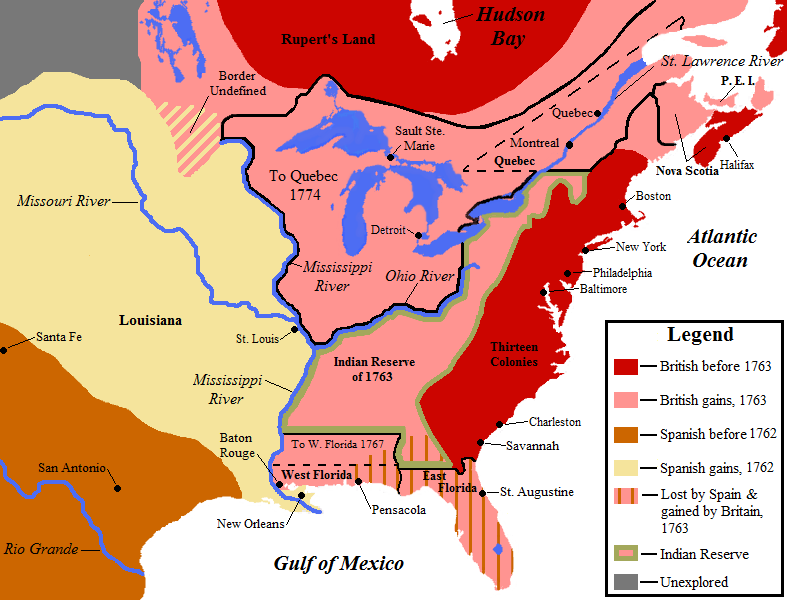
Map showing British territorial gains following the Treaty of Paris in pink, and Spanish territorial gains after the Treaty of Fontainebleau in yellow.

In North America, the Seven Years' War had seen Great Britain conquer the entirety of the French colony of Canada. The war officially ended with the signing of the Treaty of Paris on February 10, 1763. As part of the treaty, France formally renounced its claims to all its North American lands to Britain (of which the French colony of Canada was a part), except Louisiana (which had been instead ceded to Spain), and two islands off the shores of Newfoundland (Saint-Pierre and Miquelon).

=== St. Lawrence valley ===
With the addition of Canada to the British Empire, Britain gained control of a strip of territory along the St. Lawrence River with a population of at least 70,000 francophone Roman Catholics, which was expanded and renamed as the Province of Quebec under the Quebec Act of 1774. Although many British people (including the American colonies to the south) hoped the French Canadians would be assimilated this was not the case as distinct rules of governance for Quebec were set out in the Quebec Act such as allowing the French Canadians to retain their Catholic religion and their French system of civil law. The Quebec Act became one of the Intolerable Acts that infuriated the thirteen British colonies in what would become the United States of America.

=== Atlantic coast ===
The island colony of Newfoundland had been dominated by the British for a long time before the French finally abandoned any claims to the area. An anglophone society had already taken shape prior to 1763, although two islands were reserved for French fishermen.

In the Maritimes, the British had previously expelled many of the French colonists of Acadia in 1755 to Louisiana, but this would not be repeated in 1763. The remaining indigenous Mi'kmaq and Wabanaki Confederacy had laid down arms and pledged loyalty to the British Crown. The British Conquest of Acadia (which included Nova Scotia peninsula, but not present-day New Brunswick) happened in 1710, and the British had already established settlements, including Halifax. The establishment of Halifax sparked Father Le Loutre's War, which, in turn, led to the British expelling the Acadians from the region during the French and Indian War. As they later captured Cape Breton Island and Prince Edward Island, the policy of expulsion was extended there as well. The few Acadians who managed to return to the area have created the contemporary Acadian society. Once the Acadians were expelled, other settlements were formed by New England Planters.

== American Revolution ==
In 1775, American revolutionaries (Patriots) attempted to push their insurrection into northeastern Quebec. Support for the Patriot cause was mixed; the clergy and landowners were generally opposed to it, while English-speaking merchants and migrants from the Thirteen Colonies were generally supportive of it. The habitants were divided; in some areas (notably the region between Montreal and Saint-Jean), there was significant support, and militia companies were raised in support of the Patriots by James Livingston.

Patriot attack on northeastern Quebec: routes of the Arnold and Montgomery expeditions

The Patriots laid siege to Fort Saint-Jean, capturing it and Montreal in November 1775. They then marched on Quebec City, where an attempt to take the city on December 31, 1775, failed. Following an ineffectual siege, the arrival of British troops in May 1776 sent the Patriots into retreat back toward Montreal. An attempt against British troops at Trois-Rivières failed, and the Patriots were driven from the province in June. Leaving with the rebel army were about 250 Québécois in two regiments: James Livingston's 1st Canadian Regiment, and Moses Hazen's 2nd Canadian Regiment.

Quebeckers living in the forts of the Great Lakes region also massively sided with the Patriots and were instrumental in the taking of the fort by the Patriots. Major Clément Gosselin, Pierre Ayotte, Antoine Paulin, Louis Gosselin, Germain Dionne, Pierre Douville, Edward Antill and Moses Hazen and 747 Quebec militiamen were all in Quebec when they joined the Patriots and defeated the British at Yorktown in 1781. In a key act leading up to the Siege of Yorktown, Louis-Philippe de Vaudreuil, the French-born nephew of French Canada's last French governor, the Marquis de Vaudreuil, assisted Bougainville and de Grasse in preventing the British Navy from resupplying or relieving Cornwallis' army in the Battle of the Chesapeake.

In Nova Scotia there was some agitation against British rule, largely instigated by Jonathan Eddy and John Allan, migrants from Massachusetts who had settled in the Chignecto Isthmus area near Fort Cumberland (formerly Fort Beauséjour). The only major event of their resistance was the Battle of Fort Cumberland, when Eddy and a combined force of Massachusetts Patriots, Acadians, and aboriginals besieged the fort in November 1776. The siege was broken and Eddy's forces were scattered when British reinforcements arrived. Eddy and Allan continued to make trouble on the frontier between what is now Maine and New Brunswick from a base in Machias for several years.

The Maritime provinces were also affected by privateering, and raids on settlements by privateers in violation of their letters of marque. In notable instances, Charlottetown, Prince Edward Island and Lunenburg, Nova Scotia were subjected to these raids.

In southwestern Quebec, the American forces had much better success there owing to the leadership of Virginia militia leader George Rogers Clark. In 1778, 200 men under Clark, supplied and supported mainly by Virginia, came down the Ohio River near Louisville, Kentucky, marched across southern Illinois, and then captured Kaskaskia without loss of life. From there, part of his men took Vincennes, but was soon lost to British Lieutenant Colonel Henry Hamilton, the commander at Fort Detroit. It was later retaken by Clark in the Siege of Fort Vincennes in February 1779. Roughly half of Clark's militia in the theatre were Canadien volunteers sympathetic to the American cause.

In the end, the British Empire was defeated in the Revolutionary War and formally ceded parts of southwestern Canada to the new United States as part of the Treaty of Paris. During and after the Revolution, approximately 70,000 or 15% United Empire Loyalists fled the United States, with the rest of the 85% choosing to stay in the new nation. Of these, roughly 50,000 Loyalists settled in the British North American colonies, which then consisted of Newfoundland, Nova Scotia, Quebec, and Prince Edward Island (created 1769). The Loyalists who settled in western Nova Scotia wanted political freedom from Halifax, so Britain split off the colony of New Brunswick in 1784. Quebec was also divided into Lower Canada and Upper Canada under the Constitutional Act of 1791, permitting the 8,000 Loyalists who settled in southwestern Quebec (which became Upper Canada) to have a province in which British laws and institutions could be established.

A number of Loyalists that came north after the American Revolution were of African descent including former slaves who had been freed as a result of service to the British and over 2,000 African slaves. In 1793 Upper Canada became the first British jurisdiction to enact legislation to suppress slavery, with the Act Against Slavery being passed allowing for its gradual abolition.

== Post-American Independence ==
After the war the British expanded their mercantile interests in the North Pacific. Spain and Britain had become rivals in the area which came to a head with the Nootka Crisis in 1789. Both sides mobilised for war, and Spain counted on France for support; when France refused, Spain had to back down and capitulated to British terms leading to the Nootka Convention. The outcome of the crisis was a humiliation for Spain and a triumph for Britain, for the former had practically renounced all sovereignty on the North Pacific coast. This opened the way to British expansion in that area, and a number of expeditions took place; firstly a naval expedition led by George Vancouver which explored the inlets around the Pacific North West, particularly around Vancouver Island. On land, expeditions took place hoping for a discovery of a practicable river route to the Pacific for the extension of the North American fur trade, namely the North West Company. Sir Alexander Mackenzie led the first starting out in 1792 overland from Lake Athabasca via the Peace and Fraser Rivers, reaching the Pacific ocean near present-day Bella Coola on 20 July 1793. Mackenzie became the first European to reach the Pacific overland north of the Rio Grande which preceded the Lewis and Clark Expedition by twelve years. Shortly thereafter, Mackenzie's companion, John Finlay, founded the first permanent European settlement in British Columbia, Fort St. John. The North West Company sought further explorations firstly by David Thompson, starting in 1797, and later by Simon Fraser. These men pushed into the wilderness territories of the Rocky Mountains and Interior Plateau and all the way to the Strait of Georgia on the Pacific Coast expanding British North America Westward.

From 1783 through 1801, the British Empire, including British North America (but not India, which was under the East India Company, and later the India Office), was administered by the Home Office and by the Home Secretary, then from 1801 to 1854 by the War Office (which became the War and Colonial Office) and Secretary of State for War and Colonies (as the Secretary of State for War was renamed). From 1824, the British Empire was divided by the War and Colonial Office into four administrative departments, including North America, the West Indies, Mediterranean and Africa, and Eastern Colonies, of which North America included:

North America

- Upper Canada, Lower Canada
- New Brunswick, Nova Scotia, Prince Edward Island
- Bermuda, Newfoundland

The Colonial Office and War Office, and the Secretary of State for the Colonies and the Secretary of State for War, were separated in 1854, dividing the civil and military administration of the British Empire. The War Office, after 1854 and until the 1867 confederation of the Dominion of Canada, split the military administration of the British colonial and foreign stations into nine districts: North America and North Atlantic; West Indies; Mediterranean; West Coast of Africa and South Atlantic; South Africa; Egypt and The Sudan; Indian Ocean; Australasia; and China. North America and North Atlantic included the following stations (or garrisons):

North America and North Atlantic

- New Westminster (British Columbia)
- Newfoundland
- Quebec
- Halifax
- Kingston, Canada West
- Bermuda

The Atlantic archipelago of Bermuda (originally administered by the Virginia Company and, with The Bahamas, considered with North America prior to 1783), was grouped with the Maritime provinces from 1783 until formation of the Dominion of Canada in 1867, and thereafter generally with the colonies in the British West Indies (although the Church of England continued to place Bermuda under the Bishop of Newfoundland until 1919).

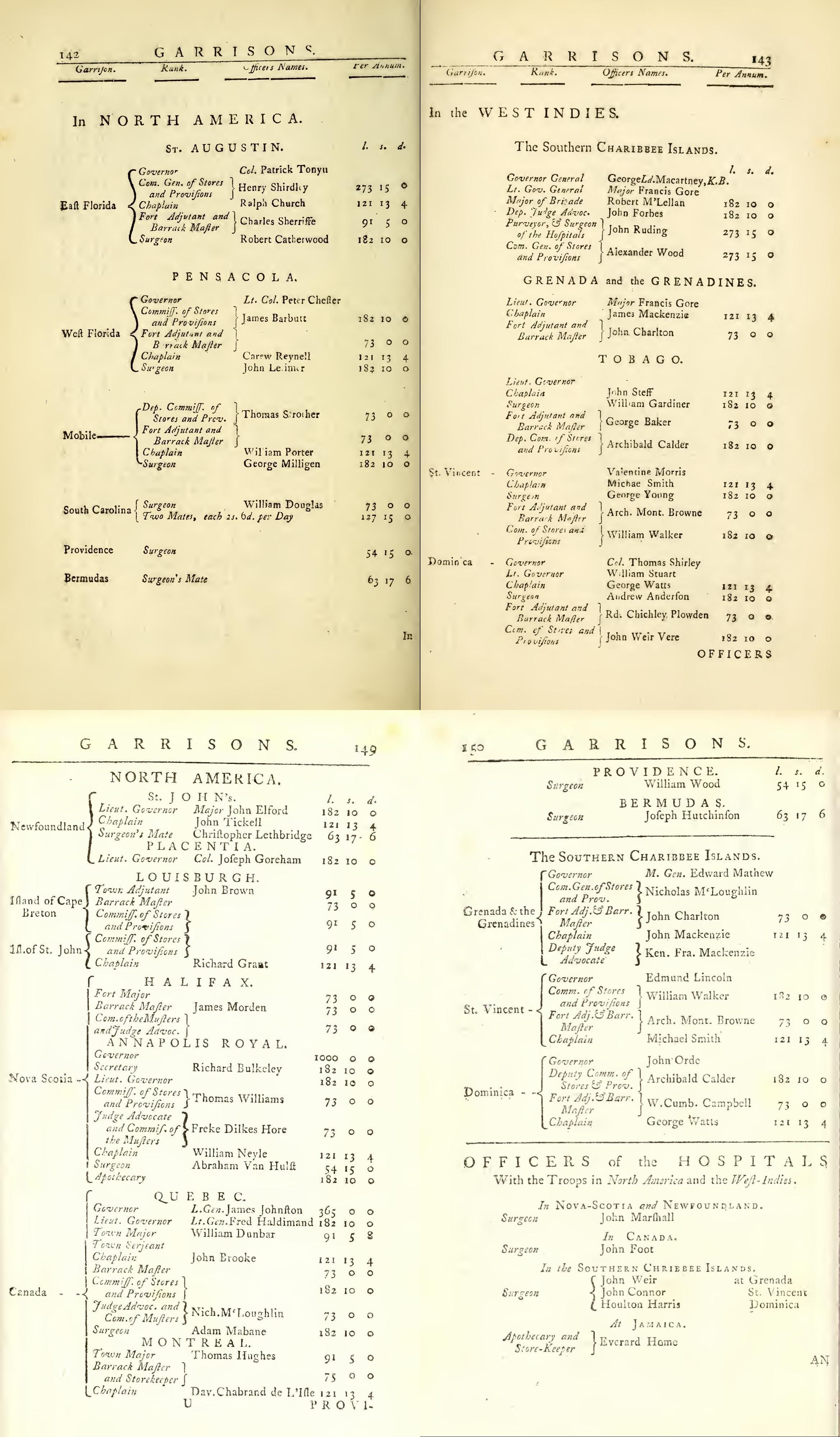
Military Governors and Staff Officers in garrisons of British North America and West Indies 1778 and 1784

Following the war, the Royal Navy spent a dozen years charting the barrier reef around Bermuda to discover the channel that enabled access to the northern lagoon, the Great Sound, and Hamilton Harbour. Once this had been located, a base was established (initially at St. George's before the construction of the Royal Naval Dockyard, Bermuda) in 1794, when Vice Admiral Sir George Murray, Commander-in-Chief of the new River St. Lawrence and Coast of America and North America and West Indies Station, set up the first Admiralty House, Bermuda at Rose Hill, St. George's. In 1813, the area of command became the North America Station again, with the West Indies falling under the Jamaica Station, and in 1816 it was renamed the North America and Lakes of Canada Station. The headquarters was initially in Bermuda during the winter and Halifax during the summer, but Bermuda, became the year-round headquarters of the Station in 1821, when the area of command became the North America and West Indies Station. The Royal Naval Dockyard, Halifax was finally transferred to the Royal Canadian Navy in 1907. Bermuda and Halifax, Nova Scotia, along with Gibraltar and Malta would be designated Imperial fortresses.

A British Army garrison was re-established at Bermuda in 1794 (a small regular infantry garrison had existed from 1701 to 1768, alongside the militia, and part of the Royal Garrison Battalion had been stationed there in 1778 but the battalion was disbanded there in 1784) and was expanded greatly during the 19th Century, both to defend the colony as a naval base and to launch amphibious operations against the Atlantic coast of the United States in any war that should transpire. Prior to 1784, the Bermuda Garrison had been placed under the military Commander-in-Chief America in New York during the American War of Independence, but was to become part of the Nova Scotia Command until the 1860s (in 1815, Lieutenant-General Sir George Prevost was Captain-General and Governor-in-Chief in and over the Provinces of Upper-Canada, Lower-Canada, Nova-Scotia, and New-Brunswick, and their several Dependencies, Vice-Admiral of the same, Lieutenant-General and Commander of all His Majesty's Forces in the said Provinces of Lower Canada and Upper-Canada, Nova-Scotia and New-Brunswick, and their several Dependencies, and in the islands of Newfoundland, Prince Edward, Cape Breton and the Bermudas, &c. &c. &c. Beneath Prevost, the staff of the British Army in the Provinces of Nova-Scotia, New-Brunswick, and their Dependencies, including the Islands of Newfoundland, Cape Breton, Prince Edward and Bermuda were under the Command of Lieutenant-General Sir John Coape Sherbrooke. Below Sherbrooke, the Bermuda Garrison was under the immediate control of the Lieutenant-Governor of Bermuda, Major-General George Horsford). The Royal Navy, British Army, Royal Marines, and Colonial Marines forces based in Bermuda carried out actions of this sort during the American War of 1812 (most notably the Burning of Washington in retribution for the "wanton destruction of private property along the north shores of Lake Erie" by American forces under Col. John Campbell in May 1814, the most notable being the Raid on Port Dover) to draw United States forces away from the Canadian border. In 1828, His Excellency George, Earl of Dalhousie, (Baron Dalhousie, of Dalhousie Castle,) Knight Grand Cross of the Most Honourable Military Order of the Bath was Captain General and Governor in Chief in and over the Provinces of Lower-Canada, Upper-Canada, Nova-Scotia, and New-Brunswick, and their several dependencies, Vice-Admiral of the same, Lieutenant-General and Commander of all His Majesty's Forces in the said Provinces, and their several dependencies, and in the Islands of Newfoundland, Prince Edward, and Bermuda, &c. &c c. &c. Beneath Dalhousie, the Provinces of Nova-Scotia, New-Brunswick, and their Dependencies, including the Island of Newfoundland, Cape Breton, Prince Edward and Bermuda were under the Command of His Excellency Lieutenant-General Sir James Kempt GCB, GCH.

The established Church of England in Bermuda (since 1978, titled the Anglican Church of Bermuda) and Newfoundland was attached to the See of Nova Scotia from 1825 to 1839 and from 1787 to 1839, respectively. From 1839, the island of Newfoundland and the coast of Labrador, as well as Bermuda, became parts of the Diocese of Newfoundland and Bermuda, with the shared Bishop (Aubrey George Spencer being the first) alternating his residence between the two colonies. A separate Bermuda Synod was incorporated in 1879, but continued to share its Bishop with Newfoundland until 1919, when the separate position of Bishop of Bermuda was created (in 1949, on Newfoundland becoming a province of Canada, the Diocese of Newfoundland became part of the Anglican Church of Canada; the Church of England in Bermuda, which was re-titled the Anglican Church of Bermuda in 1978, is today one of six extra-provincial Anglican churches within the Church of England overseen by the Archbishop of Canterbury).

== War of 1812 ==
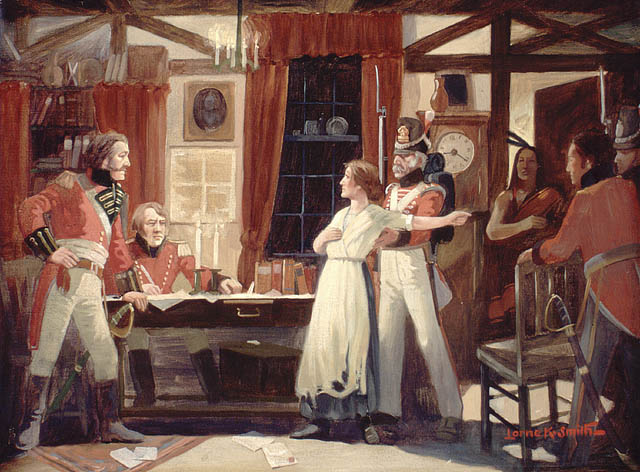
Loyalist Laura Secord warns British of an impending American attack at Beaver Dams

In the War of 1812, the Canadas were once again a battleground, this time between the British and the relatively young United States. During the war, unsuccessful attempts were made by the Americans to invade Upper Canada, after overestimating the amount of support they would receive from Canadian colonists. Much of the settler population of Upper Canada (now southern Ontario) were Americans who had very recently arrived in the colony, and some of them did support the invading force; however, the rest of the settler population was made up of the descendants of Loyalists or the original French colonists, who did not want to be part of the United States. The first American invasion came in October 1812, but they were defeated by General Isaac Brock at the Battle of Queenston Heights. The Americans invaded again in 1813, capturing Fort York (now Toronto). Later in the year, the Americans took control of the Great Lakes after the Battle of Lake Erie and the Battle of the Thames, but they had much less success in Lower Canada, where they were defeated at the Battle of Châteauguay and the Battle of Crysler's Farm. The Americans were driven out of Upper Canada in 1814 after the Battle of Lundy's Lane, although they still controlled the Great Lakes and defeated the British at the Battle of Lake Champlain. In English Canada, it is seen as a victory against American invasions, with heroic legends surrounding many of the participants (such as Isaac Brock and Laura Secord) and battles (especially those in the Niagara Peninsula).

== Fur trade ==
For centuries one of the most important economic ventures in North America was the fur trade. This trade, which had been pioneered by the French, came to be dominated by the British as they gained increasing territory on the continent. The main British fur trading posts were located inside of what became the United States (the British were forced to relocate northward as borders were established with the new nation). First Nations were central to the trade as they were the primary fur trappers. The role gave the peoples of many of the First Nations a political voice as, though they were viewed as an underclass, they were too important to simply be ignored. The American Revolution led to intense competition between the British and the U.S. By the 1830s changing fashions in Europe had begun a steep decline in fur prices and an overall collapse in the market. Apart from the economic losses to whites involved in the fur trade, many of the First Nations were devastated, both in terms of economic loss and in terms of loss of influence in local politics.

== Timber trade ==
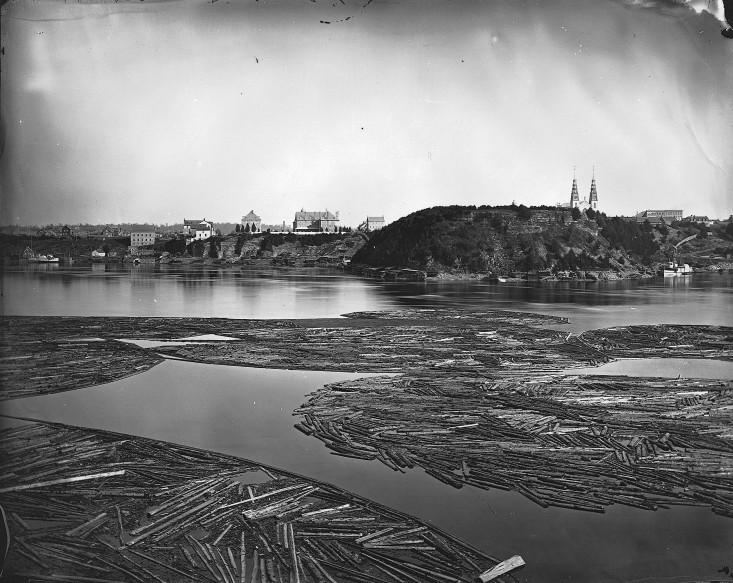
Timber booms on the Ottawa River, Canada, 1872.

As the fur trade declined in importance, the timber trade became Canada's most important commodity. The industry became concentrated in three main regions. The first to be exploited was the Saint John River system. Trees in the still almost deserted hinterland of New Brunswick were cut and transported to Saint John where they were shipped to England. This area soon could not keep up with demand, and the trade moved to the St. Lawrence River where logs were shipped to Quebec City before being sent on to Europe. This area also became insufficient, and the trade expanded westward, most notably to the Ottawa River system, which by 1845 provided three quarters of the timber shipped from Quebec City. The timber trade became a massive business. In one summer 1200 ships were loaded with timber at Quebec City alone.

== "Responsible government" and the Rebellions of 1837–38 ==
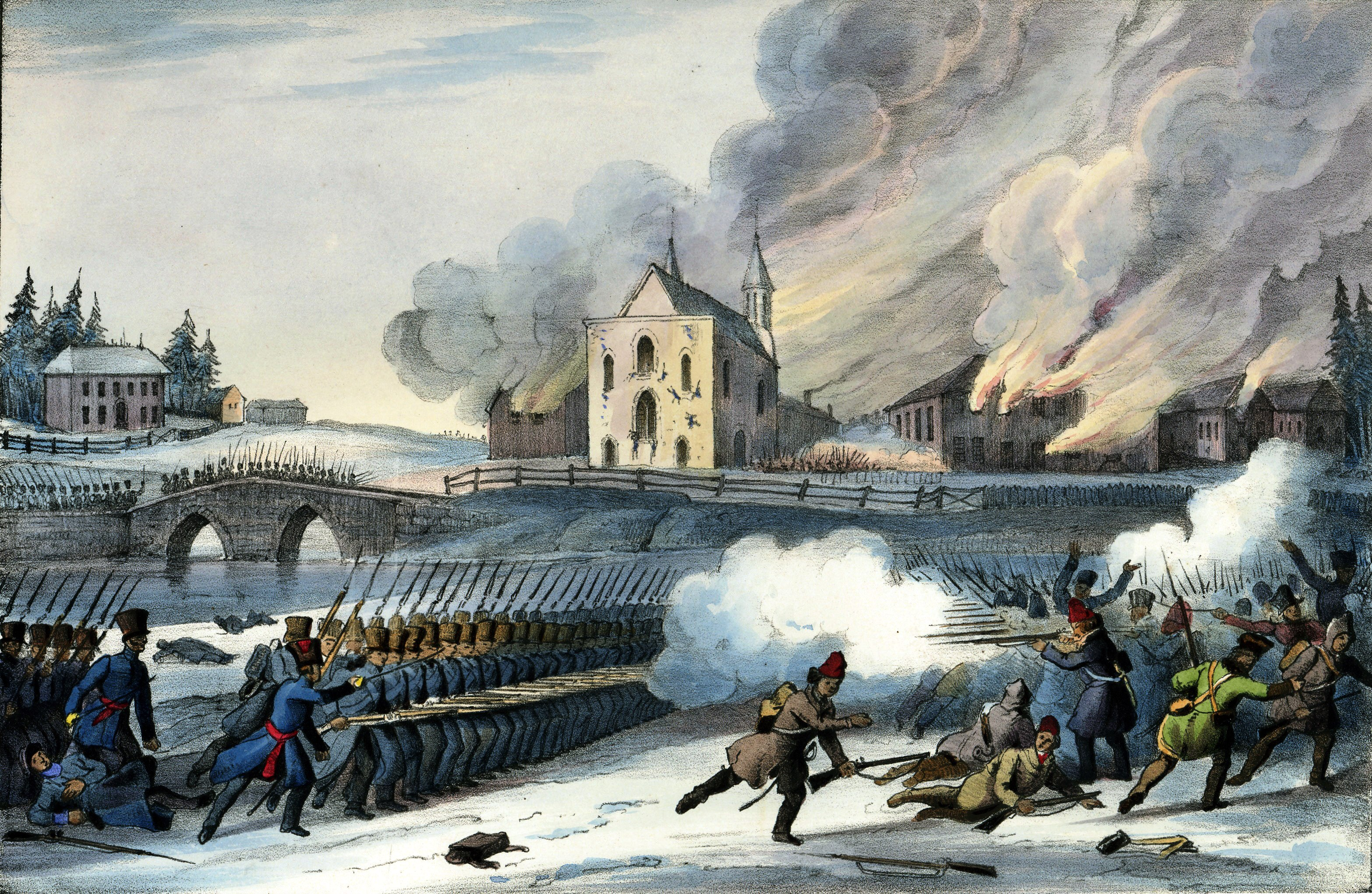
The Papineau Rebellion of 1837.

After the War of 1812, the first half of the 19th century saw the growth of political reform movements in both Upper and Lower Canada, largely influenced by American and French republicanism. The colonial legislatures set out by the Constitutional Act had become dominated by wealthy elites, the Family Compact in Upper Canada and the Château Clique in Lower Canada. The moderate reformers, such as Robert Baldwin and Louis-Hippolyte Lafontaine, argued for a more representational form of government which they called "responsible government".

By "responsible," the reformers meant that such a government would be ultimately responsible to the will of the subjects of the colonies, not to authorities in London. The critical move toward responsible government came between 1846 and 1850. In practice, it meant that the Executive Council of each colony formulated policy with the assistance of the legislative branch. The legislature voted approval or disapproval, and the appointed governor enacted those policies that it had approved. It was a transition from the older system when the governor took advice from an executive council, and use the legislature chiefly to raise money. The radical reformers, such as William Lyon Mackenzie and Louis-Joseph Papineau demanded equality or a complete break from British rule and the establishment of a republic.

Louis-Joseph Papineau was elected speaker of the colonial assembly in 1815. His attempts at reform were ignored by the British, and in 1834, the assembly passed The Ninety-Two Resolutions, outlining its grievances against the legislative council. Papineau organized boycotts and civil disobedience. The colonial government illegally ordered the arrest of Papineau. The Patriotes resorted to armed resistance and planned the Lower Canada Rebellion in the fall of 1837. British troops in the colony quickly put down the rebellion and forced Papineau to flee to the United States. A second rebellion by the Frères chasseurs of Robert Nelson broke out one year later, but the British put it down as well, with much loss of life and destruction of property.

William Lyon Mackenzie, a Scottish immigrant and reformist mayor of York (Toronto), organized the Upper Canada Rebellion in December 1837 after the Patriotes rebellion had begun. Upper Canadians had similar grievances; they were annoyed at the undemocratic governance of the colony, and especially by the corrupt and inefficient Bank of Upper Canada and the Canada Company. On December 4, the rebels assembled near Montgomery's Tavern, where the British troops stationed in the city met them on December 7. The rebels were hopelessly outnumbered and outgunned and were defeated in less than an hour. Mackenzie escaped to the United States.

Also in December, a group of Irish immigrants attempted to seize southwestern Ontario by force in the Patriot War. They were defeated by government troops at Windsor.

== Lord Durham's report ==
Lord Durham was appointed Governor General of Canada in 1838. He was assigned to investigate the causes of the Rebellions, and concluded that the problem was essentially animosity between the British and French inhabitants of Canada. His Report on the Affairs of British North America contains the famous description of "two nations warring in the bosom of a single state." For Durham, the French Canadians were culturally backwards, and he was convinced that only a union of French and English Canada would allow the colony to progress in the interest of Great Britain. A political union would, he hoped, cause the French-speakers to be assimilated by English-speaking settlements, solving the problem of French Canadian nationalism once and for all.

== Act of Union (1840) ==
Lord Durham was succeeded by Lord Sydenham who was responsible for implementing Durham's recommendations in the Act of Union 1840 passed on July 23, 1840, by the Parliament of the United Kingdom and proclaimed February 10, 1841. Upper and Lower Canada became, respectively, Canada West and Canada East, both with 42 seats in the Legislative Assembly of the Province of Canada despite Lower Canada being more populated. The official language of the province became English and French was explicitly banned in the Parliament and in the courts.

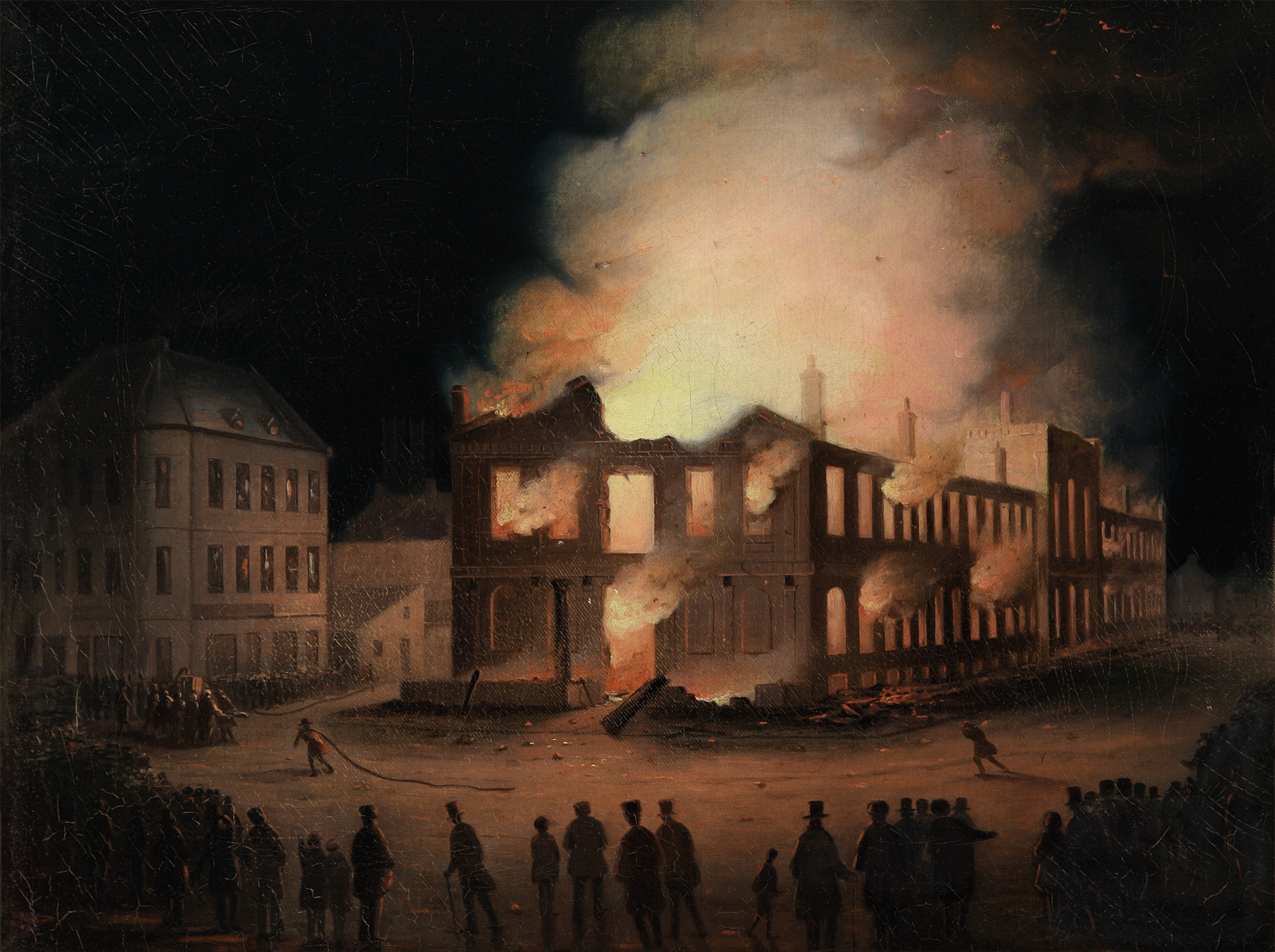
The Burning of the Parliament Buildings in Montreal – 1849, Joseph Légaré, c.1849

The moderate reformers Louis-Hippolyte Lafontaine and Robert Baldwin fought two successive governors general Sir Charles Bagot and Sir Charles Metcalfe to secure what became known as responsible government. Metcalfe fought to preserve the prerogatives of the Crown and the governor's control over the administration and patronage. He nonetheless had to make some concessions to win support, and the most notable of these was persuading the Colonial Office to grant amnesty to the rebels of 1837–38, and to abandon forced anglicization of the French-speaking population. Lafontaine and Baldwin reintroduced French as an official language alongside English in the Assembly, the Courts and other governmental bodies. Under the progressive Governor General James Bruce (Lord Elgin), a bill was passed to allow the leaders of former Patriote movement to return to their homeland; Papineau returned and for a short time re-entered Canadian politics. A similar bill was passed for the former Upper Canadian rebels. Elgin also implemented the practice of responsible government in 1848, several months after it had already been granted to the colony of Nova Scotia.

The parliament of United Canada in Montreal was set on fire by a mob of Tories in 1849 after the passing of an indemnity bill for the people who suffered losses during the rebellions of Lower Canada.

One noted achievement of the Union was the Canadian–American Reciprocity Treaty of 1855 which sanctioned free trade in resources. However, the achievement must be seen in the wider politics of British North America which had seen the major boundary disputes with the United States settled (see Rush–Bagot Treaty, Treaty of 1818, Webster–Ashburton Treaty, Oregon Treaty), thus easing tensions which for most of the first half of the 19th century had Americans threatening war or retaliation.

The Union Act of 1840 was ultimately unsuccessful, and led to calls for a greater political union in the 1850s and 1860s. Support for independence was strengthened by events such as the Battle of Ridgeway, an 1866 invasion into Ontario by some 1500 Irish nationalists which was repulsed largely by local militia.

== British colonies on the northwest coast ==
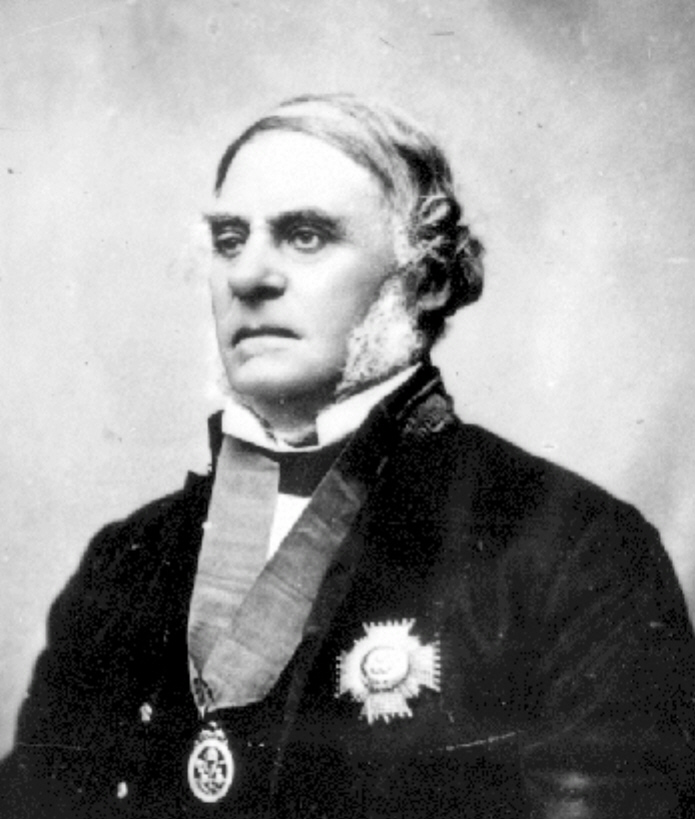
Sir James Douglas, governor of the Colonies of British Columbia and Vancouver Island

Although Spain had taken the lead in the exploration of the northwest Pacific Coast, with the voyages of Juan José Pérez Hernández in 1774 and 1775, by the time the Spanish determined to build a fort on Vancouver Island, the British navigator James Cook had himself visited Nootka Sound and charted the coast as far as Alaska, while British and American traders had begun settling on the coast so as to develop resources for trade with Europe and Asia. In 1793, Alexander Mackenzie a Scotsman working for the North West Company crossed the continent and with his aboriginal guides, French-Canadian voyageurs and another Scot, reached the mouth of the Bella Coola River, completing the first continental crossing of North America north of Mexico, missing George Vancouver's charting expedition to the region by only a few weeks. The competing imperial claims between Russia, Spain and Britain were compounded by treaties between the former two powers and the United States, which pressed for the annexation of most of what is now British Columbia, not recognizing the title of the many First Nations present.

With the signing of the Oregon Treaty in 1846, the United States agreed to establish its northern border with western British North America along the 49th parallel. By 1857, Americans and British were beginning to respond to rumours of gold in the Fraser River area. Almost overnight, some ten to twenty thousand men moved into the region around present-day Yale, British Columbia, sparking the Fraser Canyon Gold Rush. Governor James Douglas was suddenly faced with having to exert British authority over a largely alien population. In order to normalize its jurisdiction, and undercut any Hudsons's Bay Company claims to the resource wealth of the mainland, the Crown colony of British Columbia was established August 2, 1858. Douglas signed a few treaties with the First Nations on Vancouver Island, but did not otherwise recognize the First Nations of the colony. In 1866, it was united with the Colony of Vancouver Island into the united Colony of British Columbia.

By the mid-1850s, politicians in the Province of Canada began to contemplate western expansion. They questioned the Hudson's Bay Company's tenure of Rupert's Land and the Arctic territories, and launched a series of exploring expeditions to familiarize themselves and the settler population with the geography and climate of the region.

== Trade with the United States ==
In 1854, the Governor General of British North America, Lord Elgin, signed a significant trade agreement with the United States on behalf of the colonies. This agreement endured for ten years until the American government abrogated it in 1865.

== Confederation ==
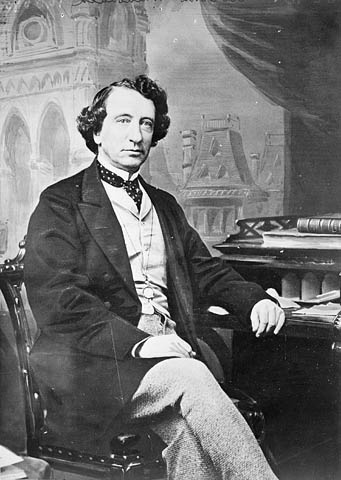
John A. Macdonald became the first prime minister of Canada.

Effective governance of the Province of Canada after 1840 required a careful balancing of the interests of French and English- speaking populations; and between Catholics and Protestants. John A. Macdonald emerged in the 1850s as a personality who could manage that task. A political conservative, MacDonald forged political relationships and coalitions with George-Étienne Cartier, the leader of powerful French Canadian bleus, and George Brown of the more stridently reformist English-Canadian and anti-French "Grits". MacDonald came to realize that Canada's likeliest hope of resisting absorption into the United States was to reform itself into a workable federation. A delegation from the Canadas made its way to a conference being held in Charlottetown in 1864 by representatives from the Maritimes who had intended to hold discussions regarding a federation of Nova Scotia, New Brunswick and Prince Edward Island. This conference was followed by a subsequent conference in Quebec City. The Seventy-Two Resolutions from the 1864 Quebec Conference laid out the framework for uniting British colonies in North America into a federation. They were adopted by the majority of the provinces of Canada and became the basis for the London Conference of 1866, which led to the formation of the Dominion of Canada on July 1, 1867. Federation emerged from multiple impulses: the British wanted Canada to defend itself; the Maritimes needed railroad connections, which were promised in 1867; British-Canadian nationalism sought to unite the lands into one country, dominated by the English language and British culture; many French-Canadians saw an opportunity to exert political control within a new largely French-speaking Quebec. Finally, but by no means least significant, were fears of possible U.S. expansion northward in the wake of the end of the United States Civil War. On a political level, there was a desire for the expansion of responsible government and elimination of the legislative deadlock between Upper and Lower Canada, and their replacement with provincial legislatures in a federation. This was especially pushed by the liberal Reform movement of Upper Canada and the French-Canadian rouges in Lower Canada who favoured a decentralized union in comparison to the Upper Canadian Conservative party and to some degree the French-Canadian bleus which favoured a centralized union. Even Queen Victoria was supportive, noting "...the impossibility of our being able to hold Canada, but we must struggle for it; and by far the best solution would be to let it go as an independent kingdom under an English prince." In the end Canada went as a Dominion under the Crown of the United Kingdom itself. It was a fresh start, but not one that was greeted with universal joy. While some envisaged Confederation for the British North American colonies as a way forward together, La Minerve, a newspaper in the new Province of Quebec endorsed the federation because it provided "la seule voie qui nous soit offerte pour arriver à l'indépendance politique." ("the only way offered to us to achieve political independence"). A change of heart toward Confederation was evident in Halifax, Nova Scotia, where the Morning Chronicle newspaper announced on the front page of its July 1, 1867, edition the death of "the free and enlightened Province of Nova Scotia".

== See also ==
- Heritage Minutes
- History of Canada
- Former colonies and territories in Canada
- Armstrong, Frederick H (1985). Handbook of Upper Canadian Chronology. Dundurn Press. ISBN 0-919670-92-X.
- Bourinot, John G (1900). Canada Under British Rule 1760-1905. The Project Gutenberg eBook.
- Craig, Gerald M Upper Canada: the formative years 1784-1841 McClelland and Stewart, 1963, the standard history online
- Creighton, Donald. John A. Macdonald (2 vols, Toronto, 1952–55), vol 1: The Young Politician) influential scholarly biography
- Morton, W. L. The Critical Years: The Union of British North America 1857–1873 (Toronto, 1964) online
- Sweeny, Alastair. George-Étienne Cartier: A Biography (Toronto, 1976) Web Version (ISBN 0-7710-8363-7)
- Taylor, Martin Brook; Doug Owram (1994). Canadian History: Beginnings to Confederation vol. 1. University of Toronto Press. ISBN 0-8020-5016-6.; Guide to historiography
- Wrong, George M. Canada and the American Revolution: The Disruption of the First British Empire (1935)
- Wrong, George M; H. H. Langton (1914). The Chronicles of Canada: Volume IV – The Beginnings of British Canada. Fireship Press (2009). ISBN 1-934757-47-0.

=== Primary sources ===
- Kennedy, W.P.M., ed. (1918). Documents of the Canadian Constitution, 1759-1915. Oxford UP. ISBN 9780722267325.; 707pp
