= Battle of Odelltown =

Coordinates: 45°2′7.8″N 73°23′26.3″W

- Part of the Lower Canada Rebellion
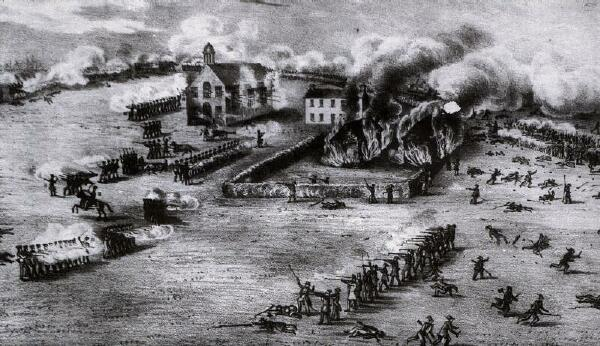
- Battle at Odelltown.
Date	November 9, 1838
Location	Odelltown, Quebec
Result	Loyalist victory

Belligerents
(United Kingdom) Lower Canada	Patriotes

Commanders and leaders
Lewis Odell; Charles McAllister	Robert Nelson; Médard Hébert; Charles Hindelang

Strength
1,000 Loyalists	500–600 Patriotes

Casualties and losses
6 killed 9 wounded	10 killed 15 wounded

The Battle of Odelltown was fought on November 9, 1838, between Loyal volunteer forces under Lewis Odell and Charles McAllister and Patriote rebels under Robert Nelson, Médard Hébert and Charles Hindelang. The rebels were defeated in this battle, one of the last of the Lower Canada Rebellion of 1838.

== Aftermath of the battle ==
After the battle, the Patriote force was routed. Some of the Patriote rebels decided to go to the USA or to lie low in the region, while the leaders of the Rebel force, Robert Nelson, Médard Hébert, Charles Hindelang, and most of the rebels marched towards Napierville. After the ordeal, Robert Nelson fled to America where he remained until his death.
