= Pied-du-Courant Prison =

Building in Quebec, Canada

Pied-du-Courant Prison Prison du Pied-du-Courant
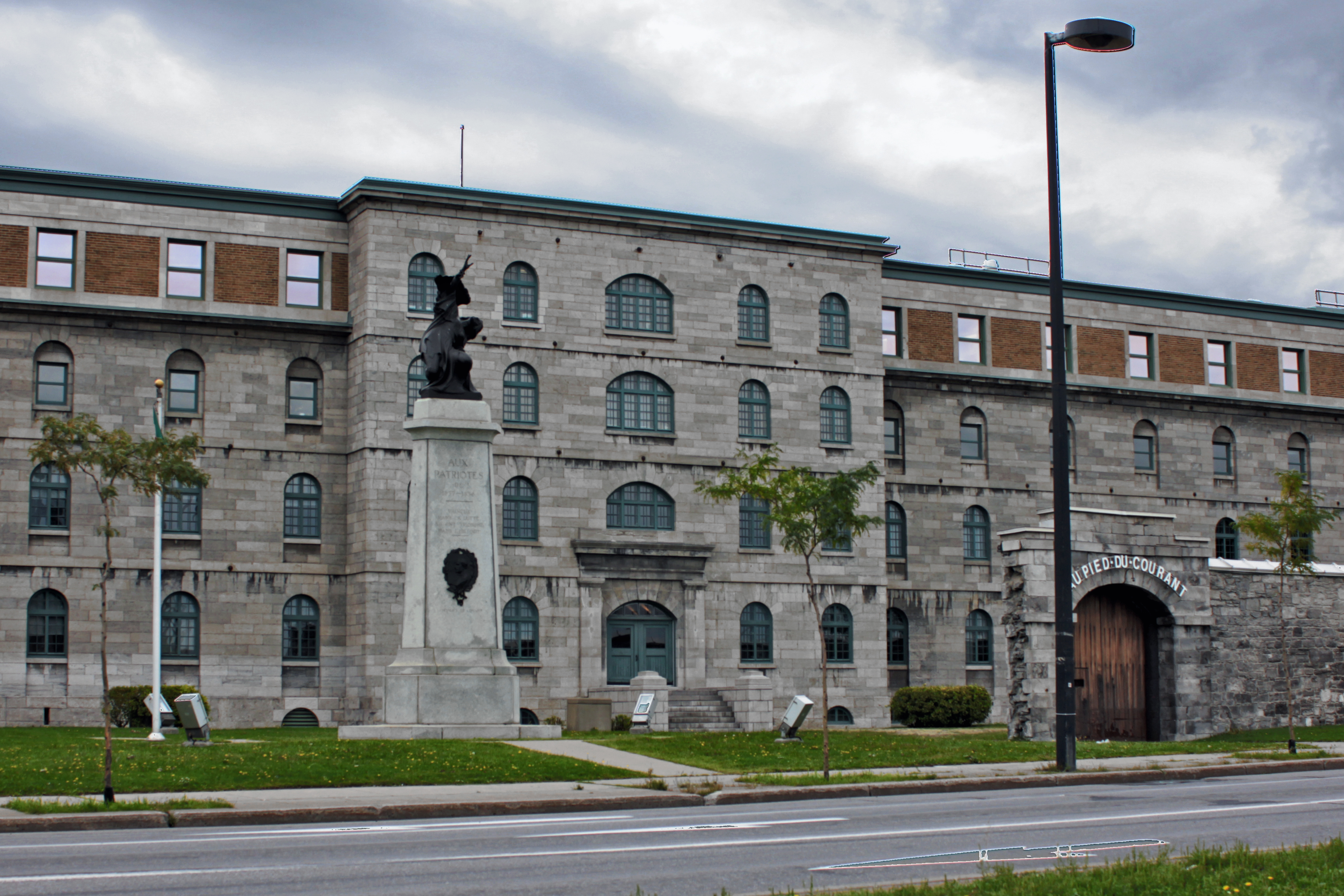
- The prison, Monument aux Patriotes and a part of wall
- Interactive map of Pied-du-Courant Prison; Prison du Pied-du-Courant
- Location: 903, avenue de Lorimier Montreal, Quebec H2K 3V9; 45°31′25″N 73°32′47″W
- Status: Closed
- Security class: historic site (1978)
- Capacity: over 276
- Opened: 1836
- Closed: 1912
- Managed by: Société des alcools du Québec
- Governor: Charles-Amédée Vallée - from 1895 to 1912
- Website: www.mndp.qc.ca

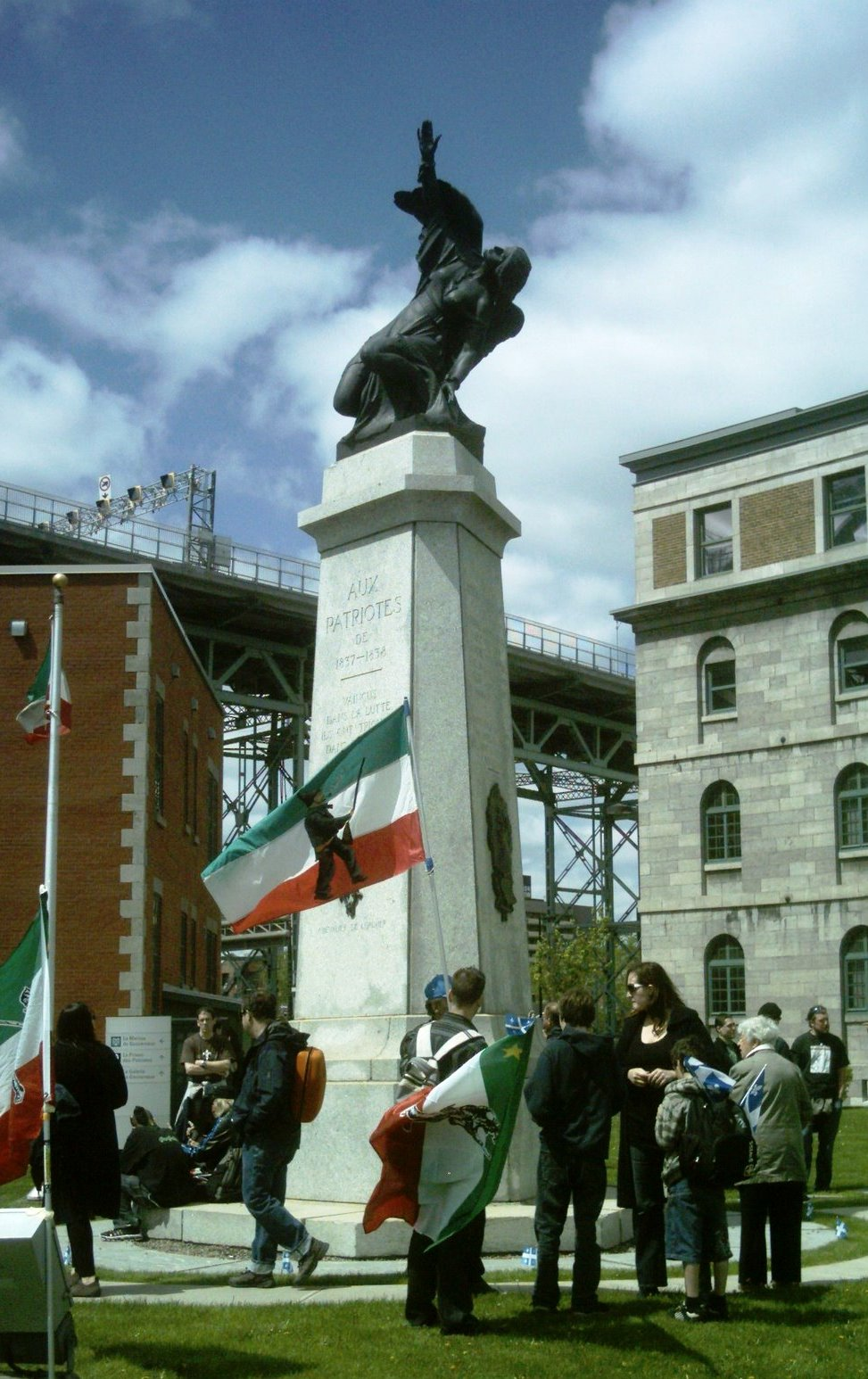
Monument aux Patriotes, by Alfred Laliberté

The Pied-du-Courant Prison (French: Prison du Pied-du-Courant) is a prison museum in Montreal, Quebec, Canada near the Saint Lawrence River and the Jacques-Cartier Bridge.

== Overview ==
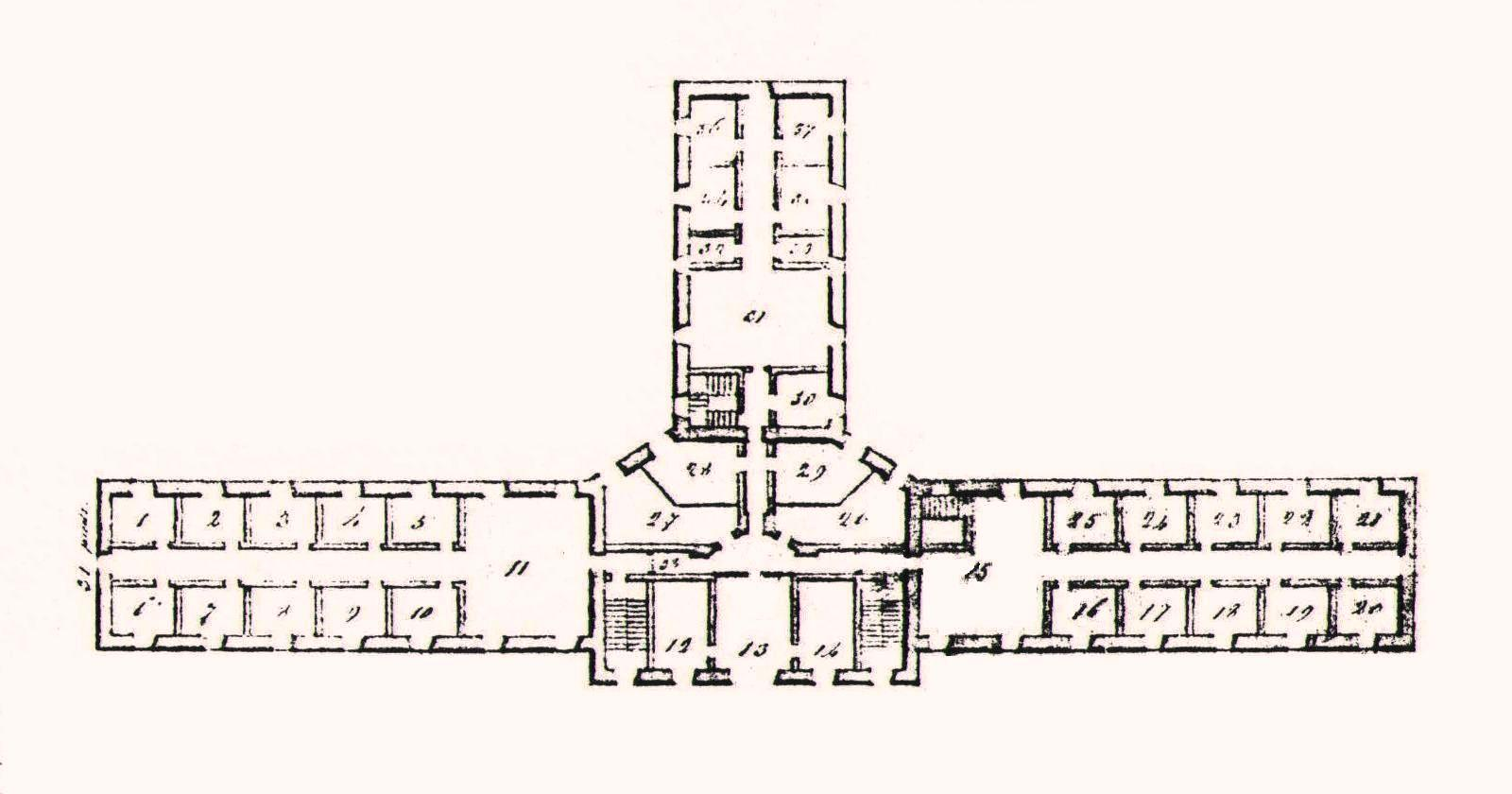
Plans for third floor of the prison c.1838

The original plan for a prison in Montreal was designed by Quebec architect George Blaiklock in 1825 to replace the prison at Champ de Mars (built in the first decade of the 19th century), but John Wells ultimately designed the building (after a prison in Philadelphia, likely the Eastern State Penitentiary built in 1829) that was finally opened a decade later. The building was built to house over 276 prisoners, but held over 1500 prisoners from the 1837-1838 rebellion. The prison operated from 1836 to 1912 as a city prison in Montreal and housed prisoners and hangings following the Lower Canada Rebellion in 1838.

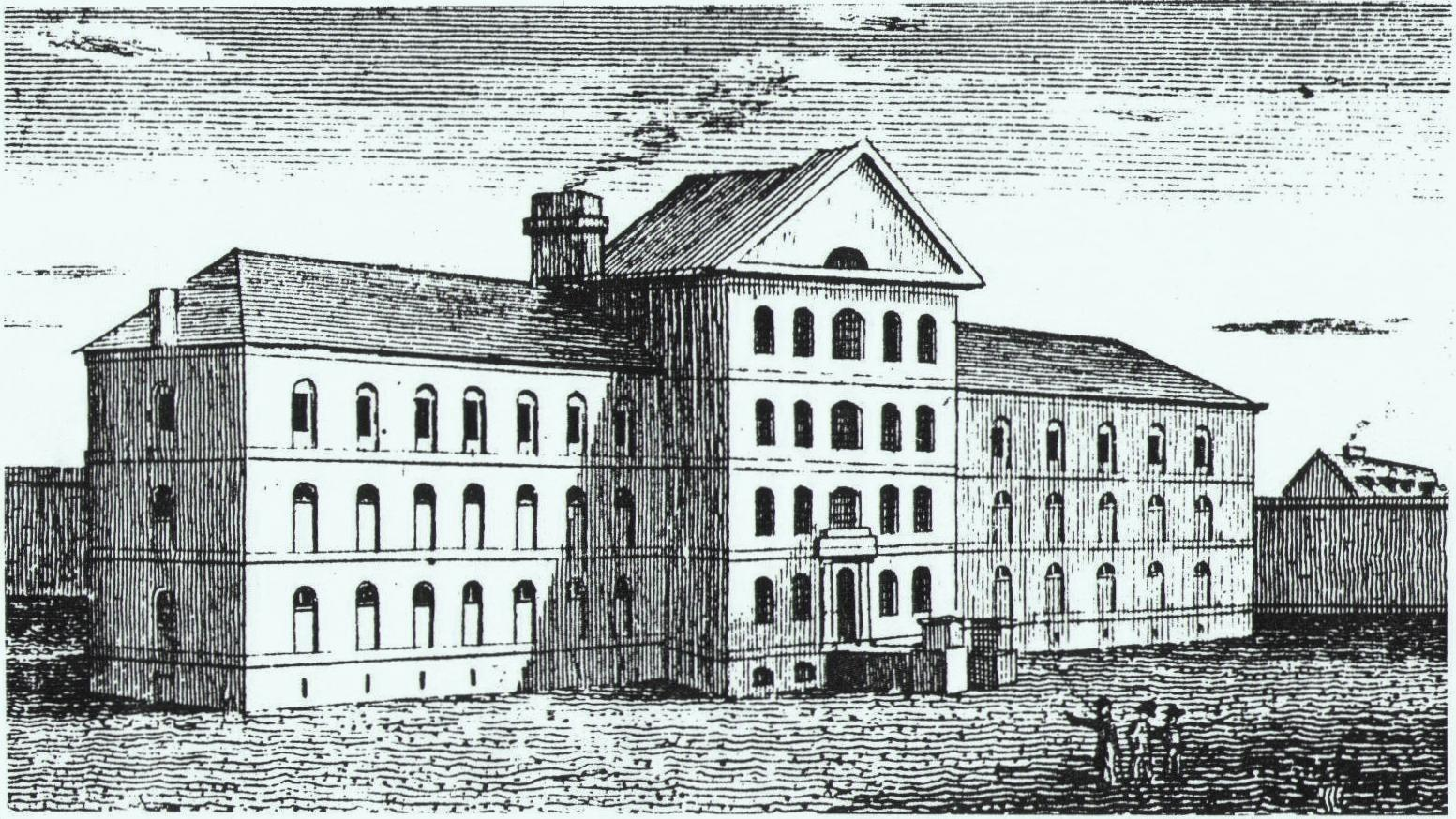
Picture of main prison wing

The prison was replaced by Bordeaux Prison and was vacant from 1912 to 1921. In 1921 it was acquired by and became the headquarters of the Société des alcools du Québec, the provincial-owned liquor board in Quebec.

The main prison building was altered with the Gable roof on the front of centre block removed, a fourth floor added (replacing roofing) and new wing added to the rear (by SAQ). The west wall in the front was demolished leaving the gate and east wall intact.

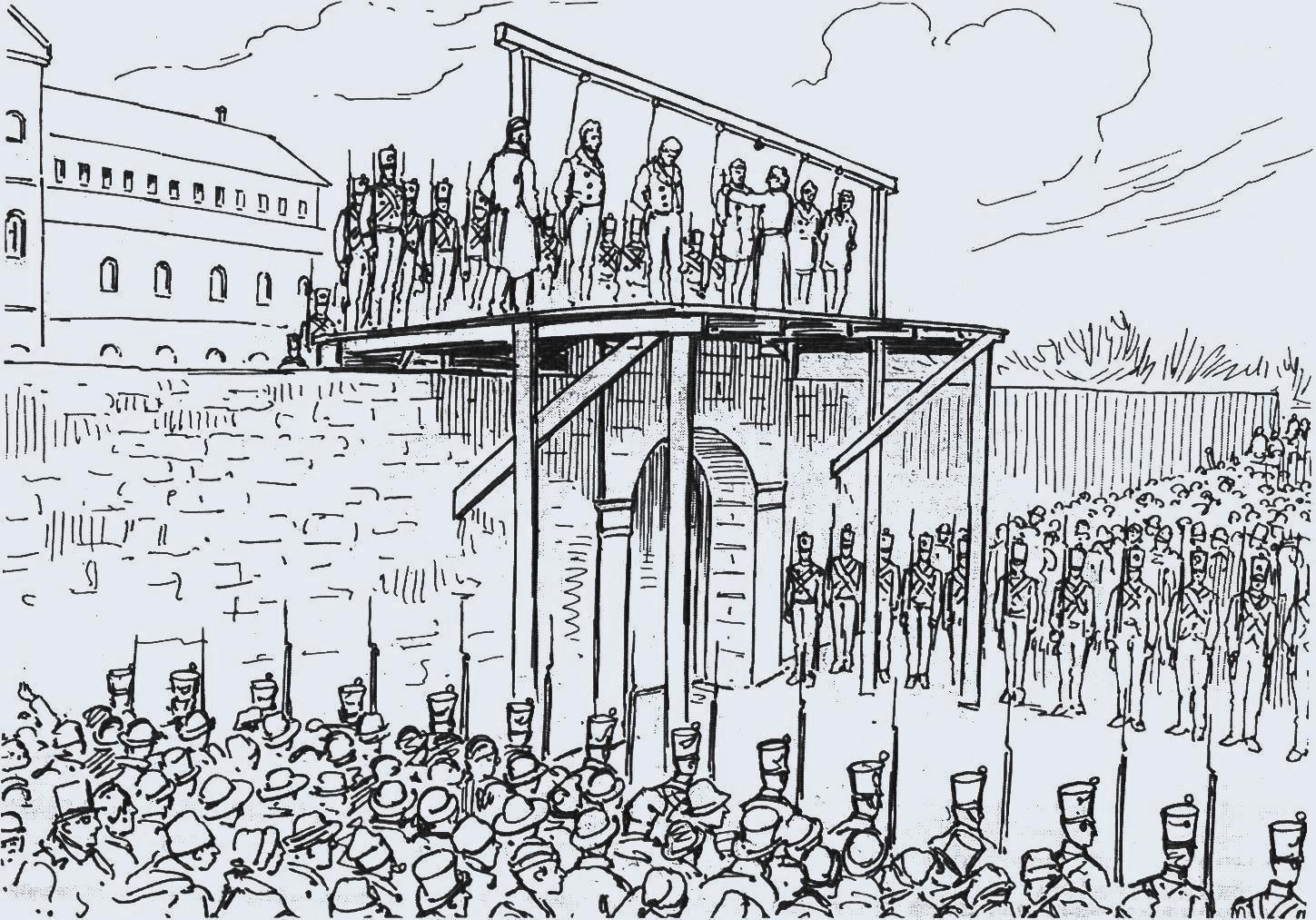
Prisoners being hanged at front of prison, 1839

It saw the incarceration and execution by hanging of several Patriotes who had fought the Lower Canada Rebellion. Because of this, it also houses a museum on the history of the Patriotes and a gathering is usually held there on National Patriote Day. Upon the front of its site is found the Monument aux Patriotes by sculptor Alfred Laliberté. The whole of Pierre Falardeau's film February 15, 1839 happens at the Prison.

In 2017, the building was bought by the Société de développement des entreprises culturelles (SODEC) and Télé-Québec.

== Monument aux Patriotes ==
The monument is located in the Place of the Patriots, which is in front of the Société des alcools du Québec offices and the site of the old Pied-du-Courant Prison.

The work of Alfred Laliberté, the Monument aux Patriotes was unveiled on June 24, 1926. On each its three faces a carved bronze medallion represents patriots Chevalier de Lorimier, Louis-Joseph Papineau, and Wolfred Nelson.

== Executions ==
- December 21, 1838
  - Joseph-Narcisse Cardinal
  - Joseph Duquet
- January 18, 1839
  - Pierre-Théophile Decoigne
  - François-Xavier Hamelin
  - Joseph-Jacques Robert
  - Ambroise Sanguinet
  - Charles Sanguinet
- February 15, 1839
  - Amable Daunais
  - François-Marie-Thomas Chevalier de Lorimier
  - Charles Hindelang
  - Pierre-Rémi Narbonne
  - François Nicolas
- December 9, 1881
  - Hugh Hayvren
- April 16, 1883
  - Timothy Milloy
- December 13, 1901
  - J.-E. Laplaine
- June 13, 1902
  - Thorval Hansen or Hancon
- November 19, 1909
  - John Dillon A.K.A. J. Smith
- November 10, 1910
  - Timothy Candy
- May 26, 1911
  - F. Grivora or Grevola

== Notable inmates ==
- Félix Poutré

== See also ==
- Patriote movement
- Quebec nationalism
- Quebec independence movement
- History of Quebec
- Timeline of Quebec history

== Gallery ==
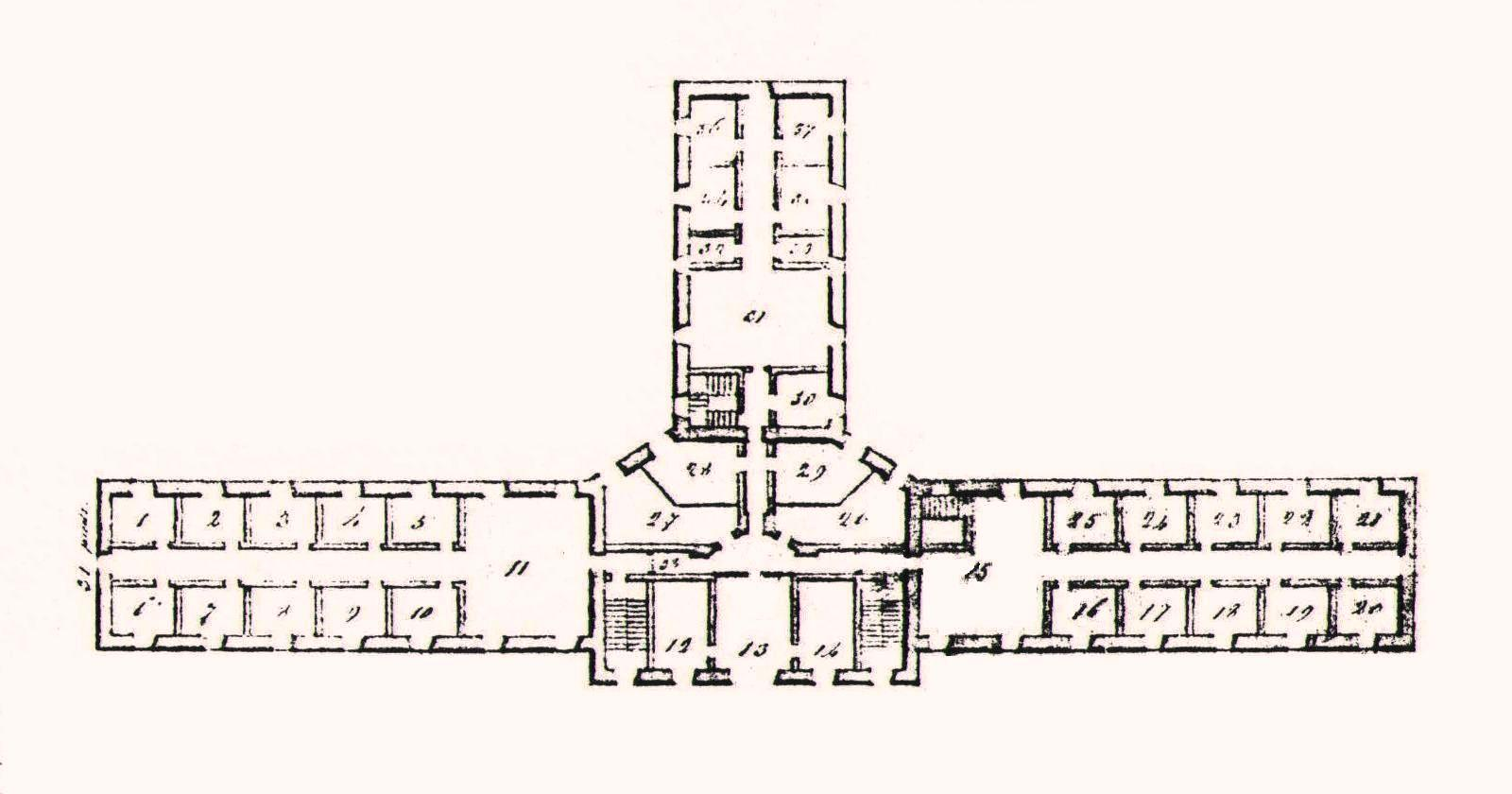
Sketch by André Jobin, 1838

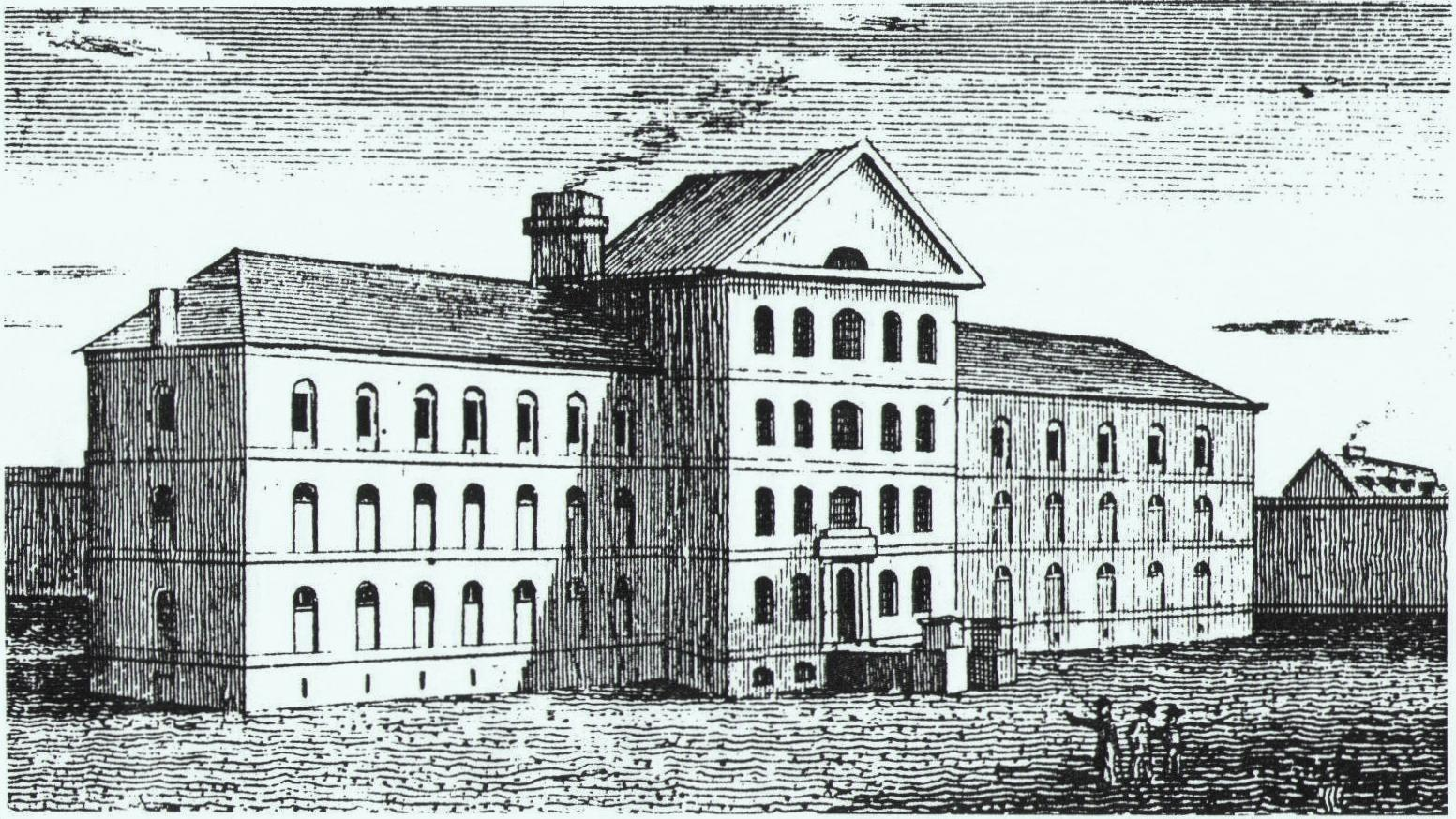
The prison in 1839

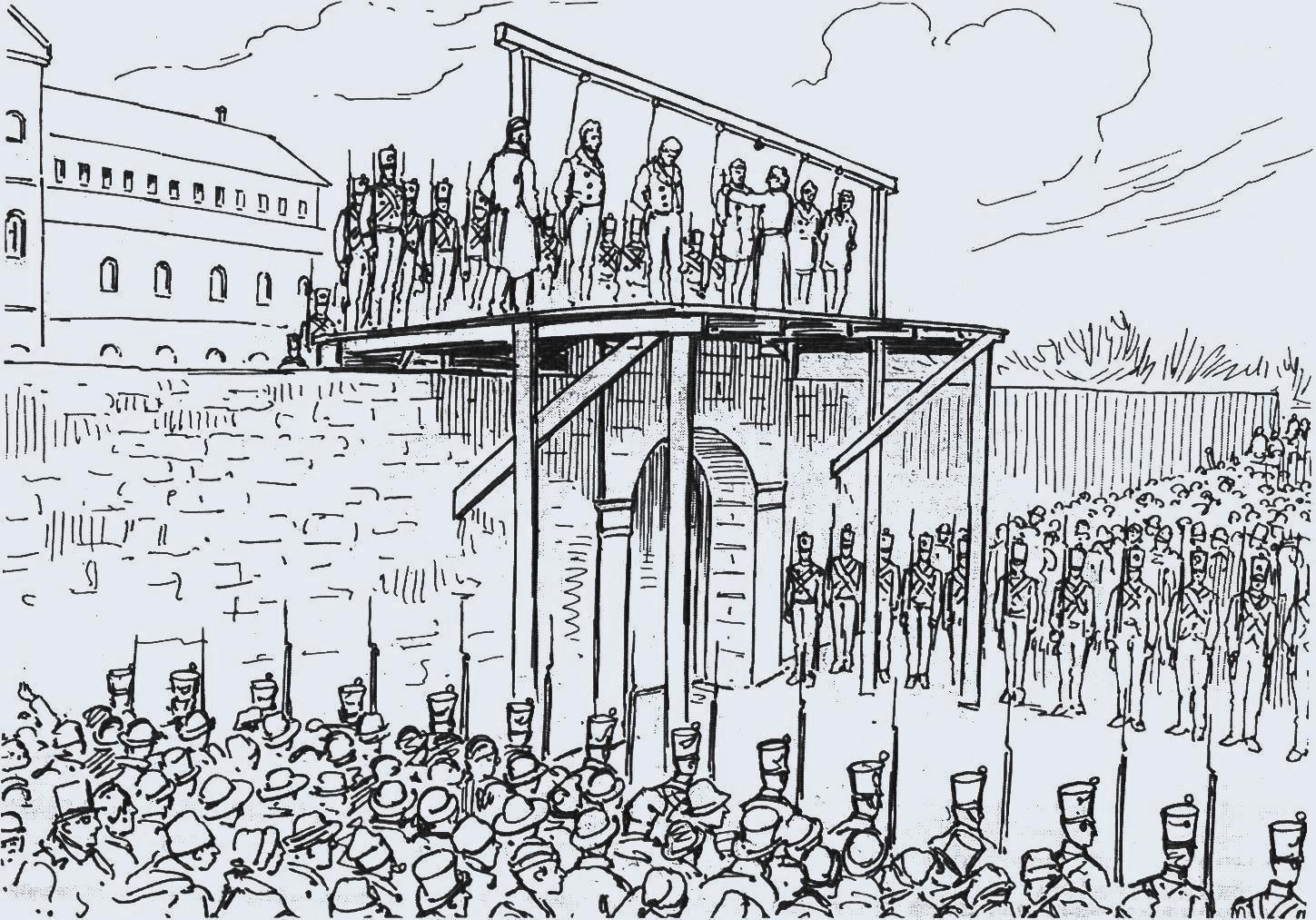
An execution in 1839

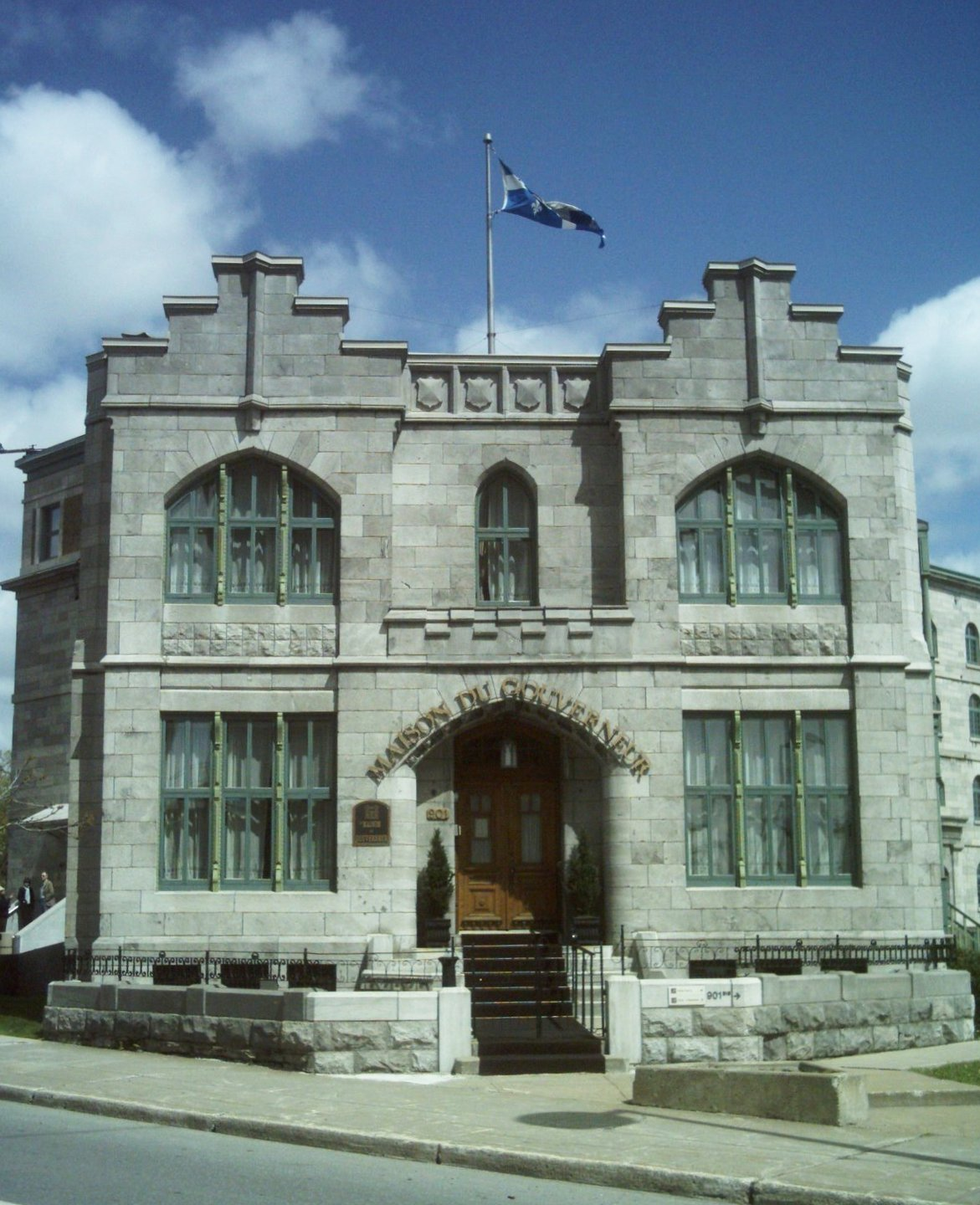
Governeur house

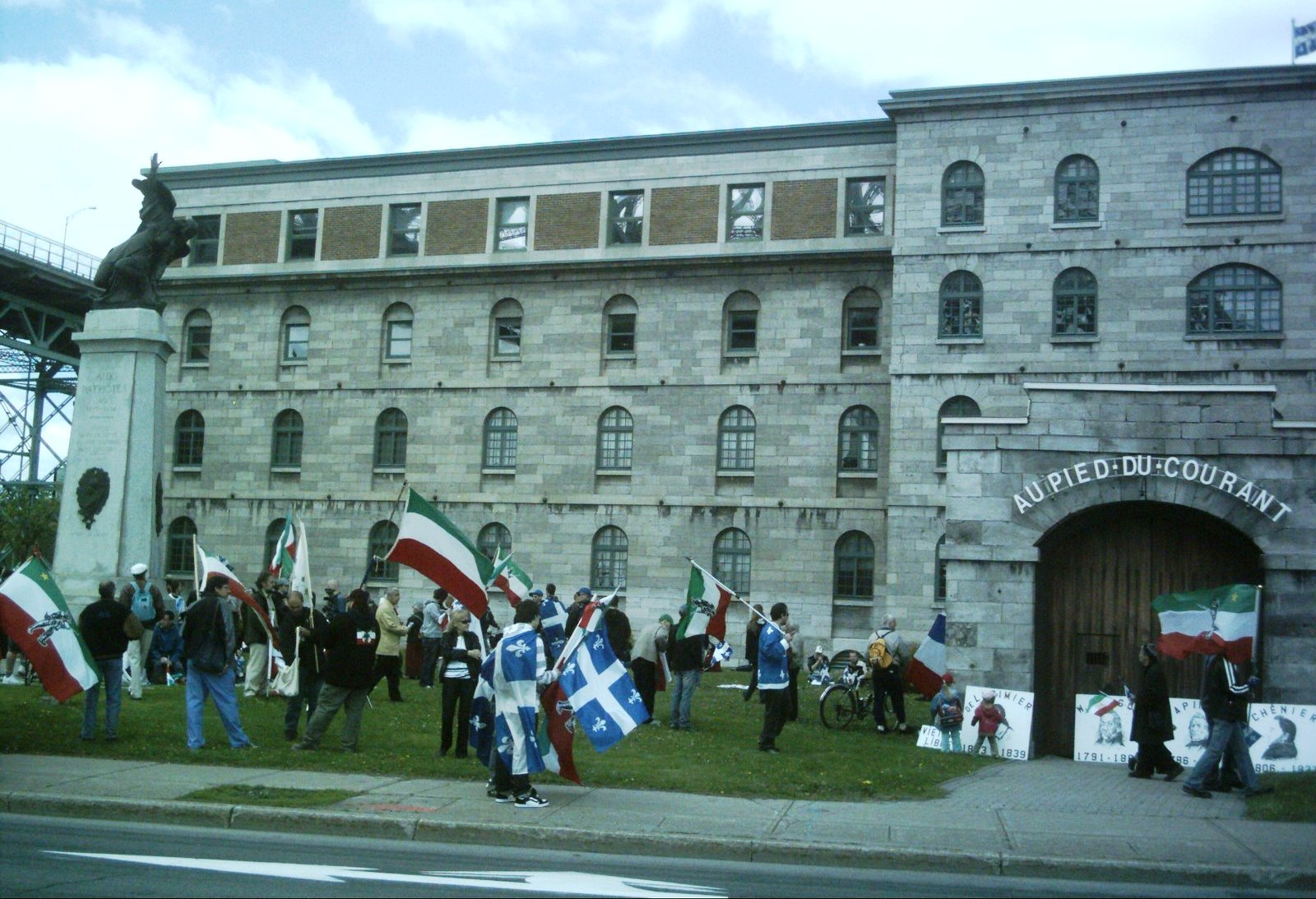
