= Joseph-Narcisse Cardinal =

Canadian politician

Joseph-Narcisse Cardinal (February 8, 1808 – December 21, 1838) was a notary and political figure in Lower Canada. He was the first person executed for taking part in the Lower Canada Rebellion.

He was born in Saint-Constant in 1808, the son of Joseph Cardinal, a Montreal merchant, and studied at the Petit Séminaire de Montréal. He moved to Châteauguay with his family, articled as a notary there and qualified to practice in 1829. He was a school trustee there from 1829 to 1832. In 1831, he married Eugénie, the daughter of Bernard Saint-Germain, an interpreter with the Indian Department. His parents and one of his brothers died in a cholera epidemic in 1832. Cardinal served in the local militia, becoming captain in 1834. In 1834, he was elected to the Legislative Assembly of Lower Canada for Laprairie County, as a supporter of the parti patriote. In 1837, he resigned from his position in the militia and became one of the Patriote leaders in the county. Cardinal did not take part in the armed rebellion, but fled to New York after his political opponents threatened to turn him over to the authorities because of his support for the Patriote movement. He returned in 1838 and became a member of the Association des frères chasseurs. He was leader for the Patriote army at Châteauguay during the rebellion in 1838 and was later captured at Kahnawake.

Considered leaders of the rebellion at Châteauguay, Cardinal and three others were sentenced to death for the crime of high treason with a recommendation for executive clemency. Cardinal and Joseph Duquet were hanged at Montreal in December 1838. He was buried in the old Catholic cemetery at Montreal. In 1858, his remains were moved to the Notre Dame des Neiges Cemetery and buried under a monument dedicated to the Patriotes of 1837–8.

== See also ==
- Kahnawake Iroquois and the Rebellions of 1837-38
