= Charles Hindelang =

- Born: March 29, 1810
- Died: February 15, 1839 (aged 28)
- Military career
- Allegiance: France
- Branch: French army

Charles Hindelang (March 29, 1810 – February 15, 1839) was a French-born military man who fought for the independence of Lower Canada (present-day Quebec). For these actions, he was hanged by the British authorities. Born in Paris, he also had a Swiss heritage and was a Calvinist.

Hindelang took part in the French Revolution of 1830 (the July Revolution), in which he became an officer. He declared that he came to the Americas to do commerce at the demand of his parents. This was however contradicted by P. H. Touvrey, a compatriot of Hindelang present during the Rebellion, who said that Hindelang specifically came to join the Lower Canada Rebellion. Recruited by Ludger Duvernay in the United States, he arrived in Lower Canada on November 4, 1838. During the Lower Canada Rebellion of 1838, he fought the Battle of Odelltown on Patriote ranks, the last battle of the conflict. The Patriotes were defeated.

Hindelang was apprehended shortly after as he attempted to flee back to the United States, and was sentenced to death. He was hanged on February 15, 1839 at the Pied-du-Courant Prison in Montreal with such people as François-Marie-Thomas Chevalier de Lorimier. In front of the crowd, before the execution, he shouted: "The cause for which I am sacrificed is noble and great [...] Canadiens, my last goodbye is the old cry of France: Long live freedom! (Vive la liberté!)" His character plays a notable role in Pierre Falardeau's film February 15, 1839 about the incarceration and execution of the Patriotes.

== See also ==
- Executions at the Pied-du-Courant Prison
- Patriote movement
- Quebec nationalism
- Quebec independence movement
- History of Quebec
- Timeline of Quebec history
