= Cyrille-Hector-Octave Côté =

Canadian politician

Cyrille-Hector-Octave Côté (September 1, 1809 – October 4, 1850) was a medical doctor and political figure in Lower Canada.

He was born Cyrille-Hector Côté in Quebec City in 1809, of Acadian descent, and studied at the Petit Séminaire de Québec and the Petit Séminaire de Montréal. He became a teacher. In 1831, he started the study of medicine at McGill College, but transferred to the University of Vermont shortly afterwards. Although he graduated with a medical certificate there in October 1831, he was at first not allowed to practice in Lower Canada because he had completed his studies in less than five years. However, in April 1832, he was given his license and entered practice at Sainte-Marguerite-de-Blairfindie. In 1833, he moved to Napierville. Later that year, he married Margaret Yelloby Jobson, the daughter of a prosperous local farmer.

In 1834, he was elected to the Legislative Assembly of Lower Canada for L'Acadie and was a radical member of the Parti patriote. Côté became a leader for the Patriote movement in his region and joined Les Fils de la Liberté. After a price was set on his head, he left for the United States. Although originally supporting Louis-Joseph Papineau, he now allied himself with Robert Nelson and helped prepare a declaration of independence for Lower Canada. On February 28, 1838, with Nelson, he led a group of Patriotes into Lower Canada; they were quickly dispersed. The American authorities arrested the group's leaders because the United States were officially neutral in this dispute but they were released shortly afterwards. At this point, Côté began to organize a group known as the Frères chasseurs. In November 1838, Nelson and Côté took over the village of Napierville but were again defeated by volunteer troops loyal to the British. He returned to the practice of medicine and settled at Swanton, Vermont. By 1840, he had abandoned the Patriote movement and moved to Chazy, New York the following year.

He returned to Lower Canada in 1843, now a preacher for the Baptist faith. In 1844, he was ordained a Baptist minister and settled at Saint-Pie, Quebec. In 1848, he went to Philadelphia and helped prepare pamphlets to educate people about the Baptist faith, as well as translating an existing work into French. In 1849, he went to Sainte-Marie-de-Monnoir (later Marieville, Quebec).

He died in Hinesburg, Vermont in 1850, after suffering a heart attack while attending a Baptist meeting there.
