= Wolfred Nelson =

Lower Canada doctor, politician, and revolutionary

Mayor Wolfred Nelson
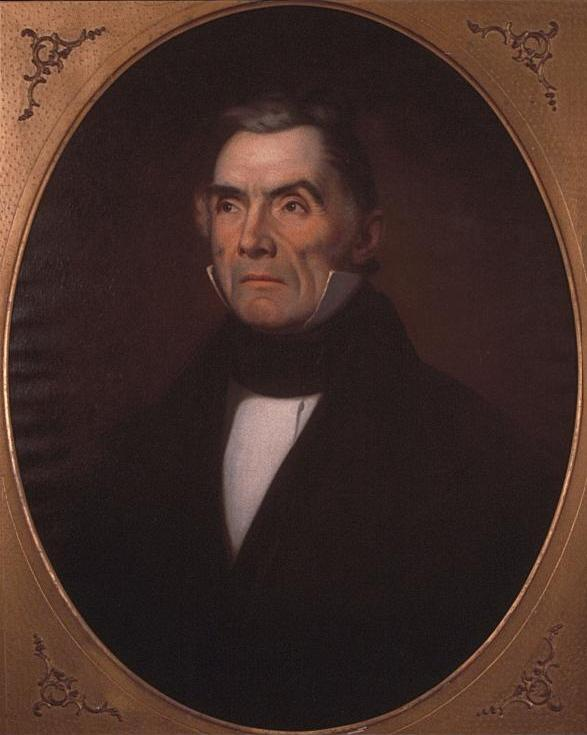
- Wolfred Nelson, by Théophile Hamel, 1848

8th Mayor of Montreal
- In office 1854–1856
- Preceded by: Charles Wilson
- Succeeded by: Henry Starnes

Personal details
- Born: 10 July 1791 Montreal, Lower Canada
- Died: 17 June 1863 (aged 71) Montreal, Province of Canada
- Profession: Physician, Politician

Wolfred Nelson (10 July 1791 – 17 June 1863) was the mayor of Montreal, Quebec, from 1854 to 1856.

== Biography ==
Nelson was born in Montreal. His father, William Nelson, was an immigrant to Colonial America from Newsham, North Yorkshire, England. His mother, Jane Dies, was a teacher and daughter of an important land owner in the New York area.

Along with his younger brother Robert Nelson, he was known as a member of the Patriotes and for his leading role in the Lower Canada Rebellion.

Nelson studied at the school of his father in William Henry. He became a physician in January 1811 and subsequently served in that capacity with the British troops on the War of 1812.

He moved to Saint-Denis-sur-Richelieu where he opened a distillery. He entered politics when elected in William Henry in 1827. He supported the Parti Patriote.

In 1827, he was elected as a member of the Legislative Assembly of Lower Canada, but he gave up active politics in 1830, without disavowing his reformist allegiance. He became a Patriote leader in the region of the Richelieu River valley, and supported the use of arms at the Assemblée des Six-Comtés in 1837.

In a prelude to the Lower Canada Rebellion of 1837, Nelson led 5,000 Patriotes in the two-day Assembly of the Six Counties in Saint-Charles, Lower Canada (present-day Quebec), on 23 and 24 October 1837, to protest the government's Russell Resolutions, taking place despite the 15 June Proclamation forbidding public assemblies. At one point he interrupted Papineau's speech, saying, "As for me, I am of a different opinion from that of M. Papineau. I claim the time has come to melt our spoons to make bullets." The conference delegates approved the Thirteen Resolutions, based on the republican document Rights of Man written by British and later American Revolutionary Thomas Paine, which was also adopted by proponents of both the American Revolution and the French Revolution. A Column of Liberty was also erected in Saint-Charles' Square.

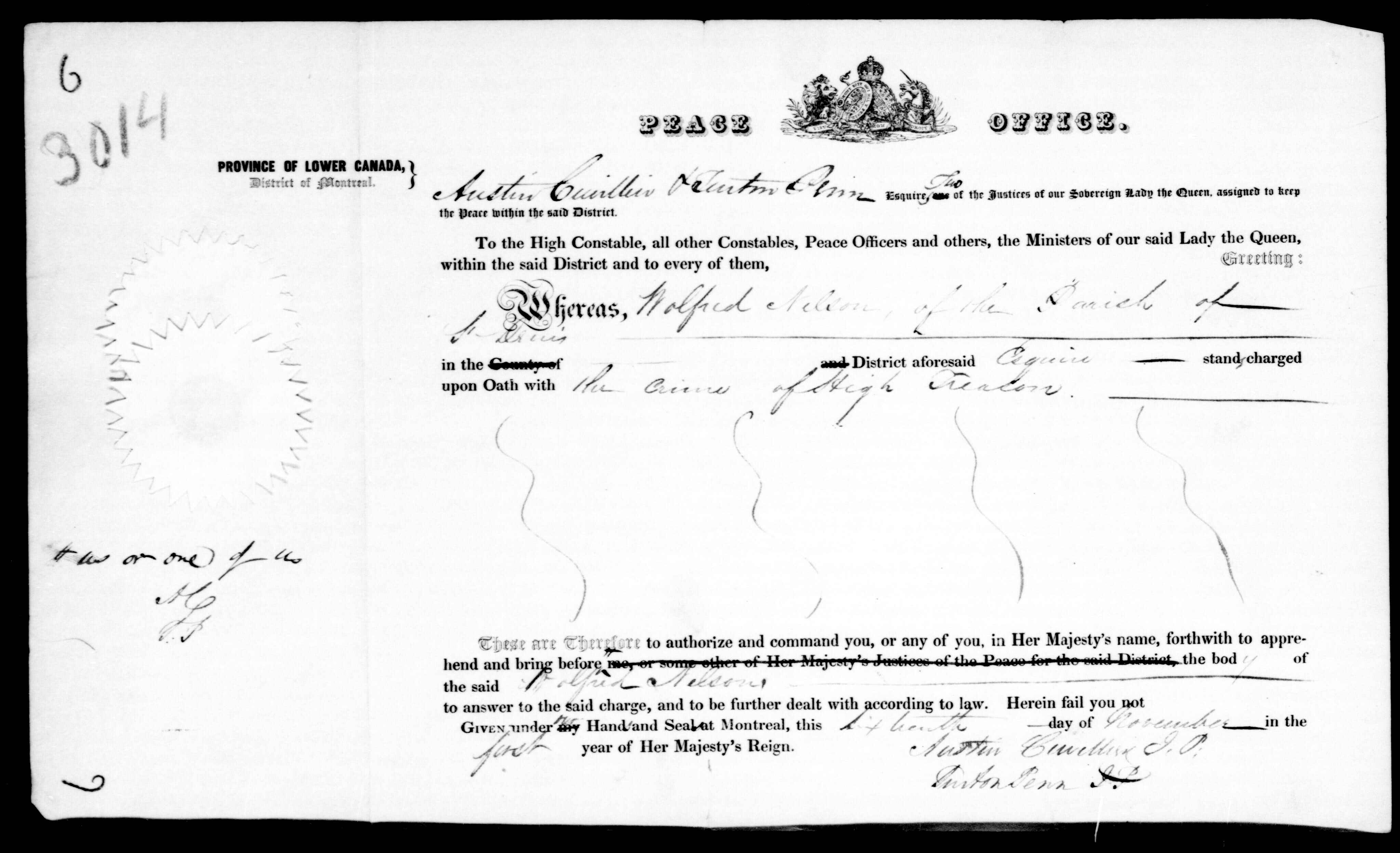
Warrant to arrest Wolfred Nelson on a charge of high treason, November 16, 1837

On 16 November 1837, he and 25 others were charged with high treason. Louis-Joseph Papineau and Edmund Bailey O'Callaghan joined Nelson at Saint-Denis at some point before 23 November 1837, where Papineau and O'Bailey decided to resist arrest and escape to the United States (into Vermont) following the Battle of Saint-Denis.

On 28 February 1838, after having crossed the border from Vermont, Nelson, along with 300 to 400 Patriotes from a secret group called Frères Chasseurs, distributed copies of a declaration of independence written by Nelson's brother, Robert Nelson. Inspired by the United States Declaration of Independence, the document listed their grievances with the British colonial government in Lower Canada, and defended their right to overthrow that government.

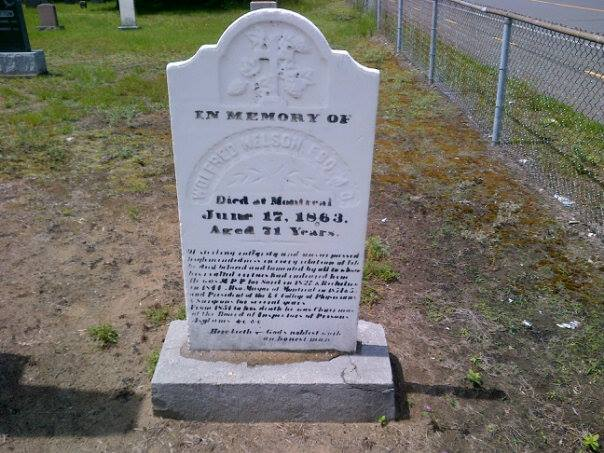
Nelson's gravesone in Sorel-Tracy

Later, he led a group of armed citizens who resisted arrest by the authorities at St-Denis. He was arrested soon after. (See Lower Canada Rebellion.) Exiled to Bermuda in 1838, Nelson was granted amnesty by the British colonial government and came back to Montreal in 1842. In 1844, he was elected to the new Parliament of the Province of Canada. In 1854, he became mayor of Montreal, and he died in June 1863. He is interred in the Anglican cemetery in Sorel-Tracy and is commemorated by a park in Mercier-Hochelaga-Maisonneuve borough.

== Works ==
- Report of Dr. Wolfred Nelson, one of the inspectors of the provincial penitentiary, on the present state, discipline, management and expenditure of the district and other prisons in Canada East, 1852 (exists also in French)
- Rapport des Drs. Nelson et Macdonnell, et Zéphirin Perrault, ecr., avocat, sur l'Hôpital de marine et des émigrés de Québec, et correspondance relative aux services du Dr. Robitaille dans le dit hôpital, 1853
- Practical views on cholera, and on the sanitary, preventive and curative measures to be adopted in the event of a visitation of the epidemic, 1854 (exists also in French)
- Five years in Panama (1880-1885)

== Gallery ==
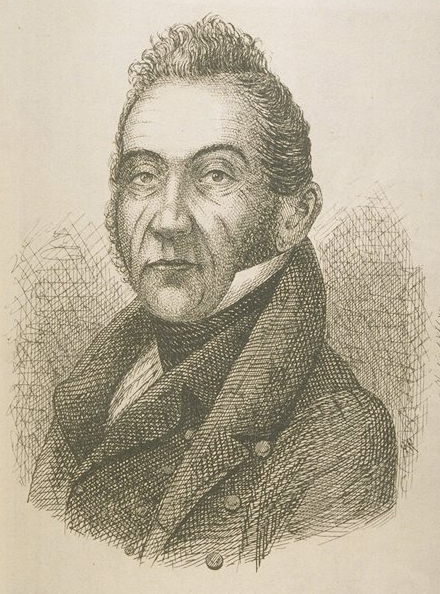

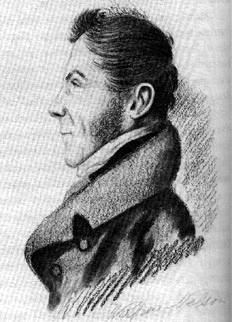

== Sources ==
- "Biography". Dictionnaire des parlementaires du Québec de 1792 à nos jours (in French). National Assembly of Quebec.
- Thompson, John Beswarick (2000). "Nelson, Wolfred". Dictionary of Canadian Biography Online. University of Toronto and Université Laval.
- Lemire, Jonathan (20 May 2000). "Nelson, Wolfred (1791–1863)". Les Patriotes de 1837@1838. Archived from the original on 6 July 2011.
- Aubin, Georges (1998). Wolfred Nelson. Écrits d'un patriote (1812–1842). Montréal: Comeau & Nadeau. pp. 177 pages. ISBN 2-9804963-8-3.
- Chartier, Jean (5 April 1999). "Le médecin du peuple". Le Devoir (in French). Archived from the original on 25 May 2011. (via Vigile.net)
- "Wolfred Nelson en 1849". Vieux-Montréal. 23 September 2005.
