= Félix Poutré =

French Canadian patriot and spy

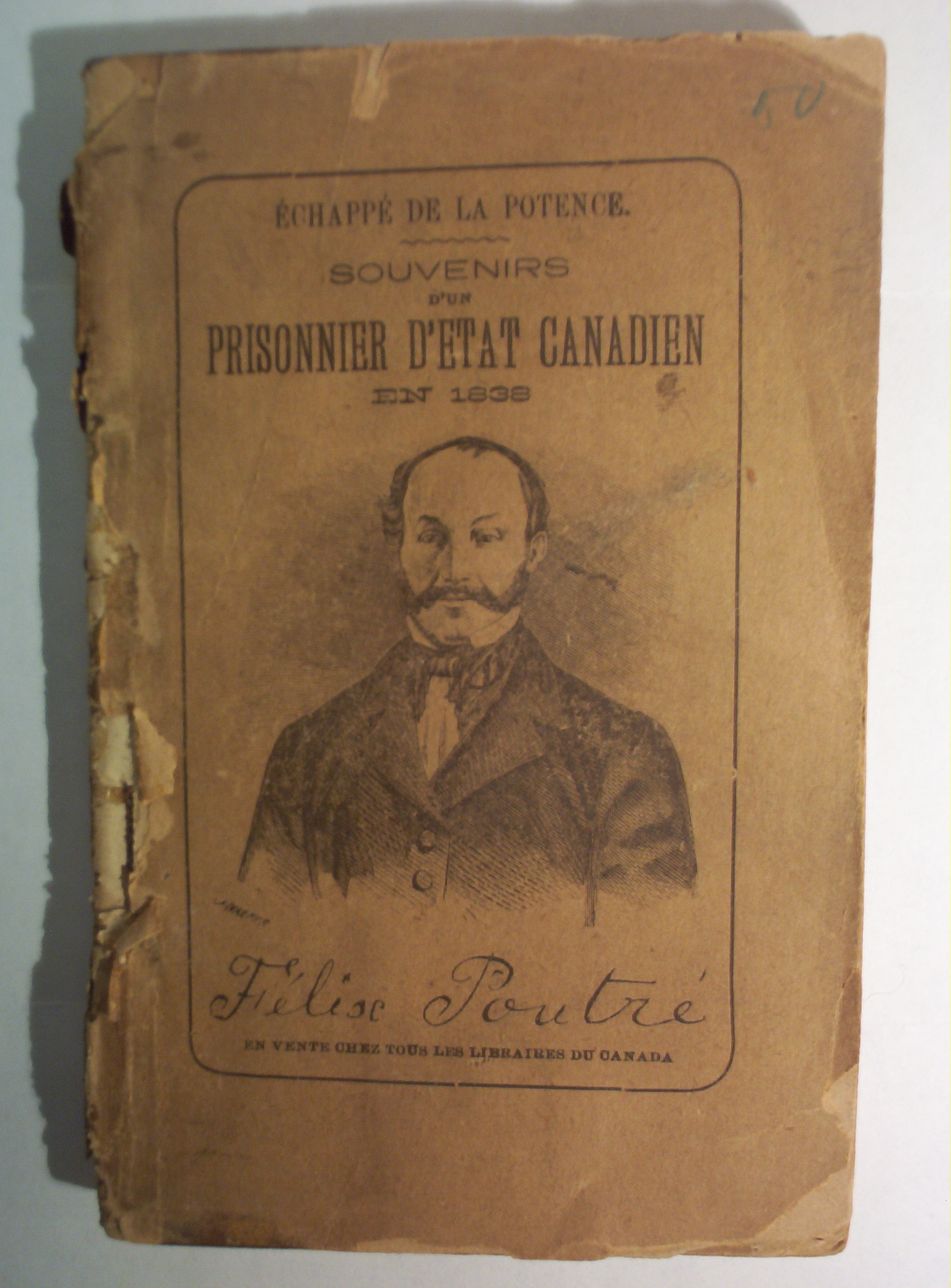
Souvenirs d'un prisonnier d'état canadien en 1838

Félix Poutré (French pronunciation: [feliks putʁe]; 1814–1885) was a French Canadian patriot and spy, who became known both as a popular hero and an infamous traitor within Lower Canada following his involvement in the Lower Canada Rebellion.

After escaping from the Pied-du-Courant Prison by allegedly feigning madness, Poutré published a pamphlet giving an account of his experiences, under the title Échappé de la potence (later translated in English as Escaped from the gallows). The work earned him considerable fame, his story being embodied in Louis-Honoré Fréchette's historical play also entitled Félix Poutré (1892).

However, it was later revealed that Poutré served as a spy for the British government, which he kept informed on the Patriot insurgents' plans while they were in exile in the United States and, later on, during their incarceration at the Pied-du-Courant Prison. This came following the affirmation of Benjamin Sulte that he had been an "employee of the government" and the disclosure by Gustave Lanctot in 1913 of compromising documents, which unmasked him as a bogus patriote. His claims to having actively participated in patriot actions have been seriously questioned, and it is probable that he rather acted as an agent provocateur on behalf of the British authorities.

== See also ==
- History of Quebec
