= February 15, 1839 =

2001 film by Pierre Falardeau

- French: 15 février 1839
- Directed by: Pierre Falardeau
- Written by: Pierre Falardeau
- Produced by: René Chénier; Marc Daigle; Bernadette Payeur
- Starring: Luc Picard; Sylvie Drapeau; Frédéric Gilles; Julien Poulin; Denis Trudel
- Cinematography: Alain Dostie
- Edited by: Claude Palardy
- Music by: Jean St-Jacques
- Production companies: Téléfilm Canada; Cinépix Film; ACPAV
- Distributed by: Christal Films
- Release date: January 16, 2001
- Running time: 120 minutes
- Country: Canada
- Language: French
- Box office: $248,093

February 15, 1839 (French: 15 février 1839) is a 2001 Quebec historical drama film. Directed by Pierre Falardeau, it is about the incarceration at the Pied-du-Courant Prison and the execution by hanging there of Patriote participants of the Lower Canada Rebellion. Those rebels sought to make Lower Canada, now Quebec, a republic independent from the British Empire.

It features as characters the historical figures François-Marie-Thomas Chevalier de Lorimier, his wife Henriette and Charles Hindelang.

== Synopsis ==
In the aftermath of the failed 1837–38 rebellion in Lower Canada, 800 rebels are held in the Prison de Montréal. The film opens on February 14, 1839, the day when leader François-Marie-Thomas Chevalier de Lorimier (Luc Picard) and his comrade-in-arms (Frédéric Gilles) are told they will be hanged in 24 hours. Director Pierre Falardeau makes no doubt about where his sympathies lie, but the film is as much about human beings confronting death as it is polemic, and there are tender scenes when De Lorimier's wife (Sylvie Drapeau) visits him one last time. Pierre Falardeau said that Telefilm Canada approved Michel Brault's 1999 movie Quand je serai parti... vous vivrez encore as an excuse to initially deny funds for 15 février 1839.

== Release and awards ==
It released in the United States by Lionsgate on January 26, 2001. It won four Prix Jutra for Actor (Luc Picard), Supporting Actress (Sylvie Drapeau), Art Direction and Sound.

== Critical acclaims ==
"It’s certainly not the masterpiece some indépendantiste viewers see in the film, but it’s also not the insufferable, propagandistic dreck various English-language critics accuse it of being." – Maurie Alioff, Take One: Film in Canada

== Cast ==
- Luc Picard - François-Marie-Thomas Chevalier de Lorimier
- Sylvie Drapeau - Henriette De Lorimier
- Frédéric Gilles - Charles Hindelang
- Denis Trudel - Jacques Yelle
- Julien Poulin - Curé Marier
- Yvon Barrette - Osias Primeau

== See also ==
- Patriote movement
- Quebec nationalism
- Quebec independence movement
- History of Quebec
- Timeline of Quebec history
