= François-Marie-Thomas Chevalier de Lorimier =

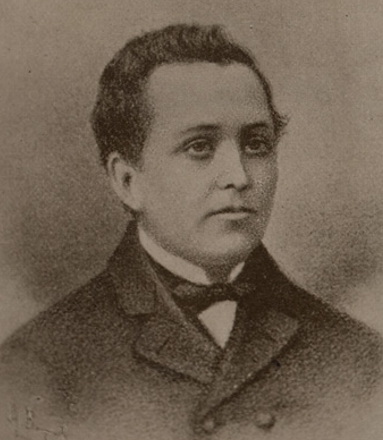
François-Marie-Thomas Chevalier de Lorimier

François-Marie-Thomas Chevalier de Lorimier (December 27, 1803 – February 15, 1839), also known under shorter names such as François-Marie-Thomas de Lorimier, Marie-Thomas Chevalier de Lorimier or Chevalier de Lorimier, was a notary who fought as a Patriote and Frère chasseur for the independence of Lower Canada (present-day Quebec) in the Lower Canada Rebellion. For these actions, he was incarcerated at the Montreal Pied-du-Courant Prison and was hanged at the site by the British authorities.

De Lorimier was born in Saint-Cuthbert, Lower Canada.

== Trial and execution ==
On January 11, 1839, de Lorimier and three of his comrades (two of whom managed to escape before being executed; the other was Chevrier Bénard) appeared before the British Council of War. Refused his request for a trial in a civilian court, de Lorimier apparently effectively defended himself and challenged the crown's evidence. However, Jean-Baptiste-Henri Brien, one of his co-accused and terrified of the scaffold, signed a confession incriminating de Lorimier and others and the British authorities, having failed to seize the main leaders of the rebellion, arguably pursued his death to make an example. On January 21 de Lorimier and his companions were found guilty of high treason and sentenced to be hanged which took place on February 15, 1839, together with Charles Hindelang, Amable Daunais, François Nicolas and Pierre-Rémi Narbonne.

The day before, de Lorimier wrote his political testament:

I die without remorse; in the insurrection I only desired the well-being and independence [from Britain] of my country. My views and my actions were sincere and were innocent of any of the crimes which dis-honor mankind, and which are too common when released passions boil up... In spite of so many mishaps, my heart still keeps its courage and its hopes for the future; my children and my friends will see better days. Looking tranquilly ahead, I am sure that they will win freedom. That is what fills me with joy when all around me is sorry and desolation... I leave behind me children whose only heritage is the memory of my misfortune. Poor orphans, it is you who are to be pitied, you whom the bloody and arbitrary hand of the law strikes through my death. You will have no gentile and affectionate memories of happy days with your father. When you are old enough to reflect, you will see in your father a man who has paid on the scaffold for actions such as have immortalized other happier men. The only crime of your father was his failure.

He was executed with such people as the French-born Charles Hindelang. His character plays a notable role in Pierre Falardeau's film February 15, 1839 about the incarceration and execution of the Patriotes. De Lorimier Avenue honours his memory in Montreal.

== See also ==
- Executions at the Pied-du-Courant Prison
- Patriote movement
- Quebec nationalism
- Quebec independence movement
- History of Quebec
- Timeline of Quebec history
