= Frères chasseurs =

1838 Lower Canada separatist militia

- Brotherhood of hunters
- Leaders: Robert Nelson, Cyrille-Hector-Octave Côté, François-Marie-Thomas Chevalier de Lorimier
- Country: Lower Canada
- Active regions: Lower Canada(present day Quebec) United States

The Frères chasseurs (French for "Brotherhood of hunters"; Association des Frères-Chasseurs) were a paramilitary organization that fought in the Patriote Rebellion on the Patriote side, seeking to make Lower Canada, now Quebec, an independent and democratic republic.

After the failure of the first uprising of 1837, the Frères chasseurs organization was founded in 1838 by Robert Nelson, Cyrille-Hector-Octave Côté (the vice president), Edmond-Élisée Malhiot, Antoine Doré, Julien Gagnon, Louis-Guillaume Lévesque, François Mercure, François Lemaître, Célestin Beausoleil and David Rochon. In September, it was composed of at least 35 lodges.

The Frères chasseurs attempted to invade Lower Canada from the United States to overthrow British rule in the colony. On 22 February 1838, president Robert Nelson declared the independence of Lower Canada. Bishop Jean-Jacques Lartigue obtained information about the group and communicated it to John Colborne, who in turn used it to quell the Frères chasseurs. Members of the Frères chasseurs such as François-Marie-Thomas Chevalier de Lorimier were executed at the Pied-du-Courant Prison by the British authorities for their actions.

== See also ==
- Republicanism in Canada
- Hunters' Lodges
- Executions at the Pied-du-Courant Prison
- Quebec nationalism
- Quebec independence movement
- History of Quebec
- Timeline of Quebec history
