= Robert Nelson (insurrectionist) =

19th-century Anglo-Quebecer physician and leader in the Lower Canada Rebellion

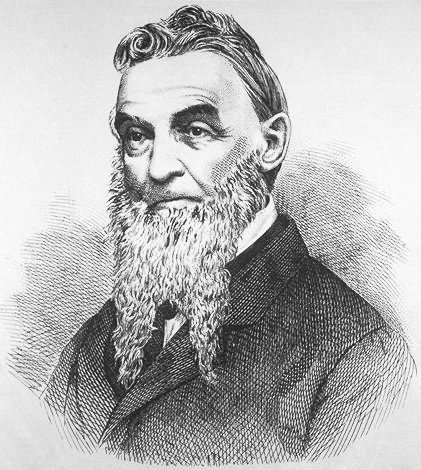
- Robert Nelson - L'opinion publique, Vol. 4, no. 14, pp. 161 (April 3, 1873)

President of Republic of Lower Canada

Personal details
- Born: August 8, 1794 Sorel, Quebec, Lower Canada
- Died: March 1, 1873 (aged 78) Staten Island, New York
- Occupation: physician, surgeon, member of parliament, teacher, civil servant

Robert Nelson (August 8, 1794 – March 1, 1873) was an Anglo-Quebecer medical doctor and a leading figure in the Lower Canada Rebellion in 19th century Quebec (Lower Canada).

Nelson was born in Sorel (near Montreal) to William Nelson, an immigrant to Colonial America from Newsham, North Yorkshire. His mother, Jane Dies, was a teacher and daughter of an important land owner in the New York area. He studied medicine in Montreal and later at Harvard University, in the state of Massachusetts. During the War of 1812, he was surgeon for the Deschambault Corps and the Indian Braves Corps.

In 1827, Robert Nelson entered politics at the invitation of his brother, Wolfred Nelson, also a doctor and member of the Parti Patriote. On November 24, 1837, Nelson was arrested with other politicians. He was freed soon after, not being involved with the rebels, unlike his brother, Wolfred, who participated in the Battle of Saint-Denis. His arrest, however, led him to join with the rebels who fled to the United States. The leaders of the Patriotes voted for the quick establishment of a provisional government and the launch of an attack from the United States. Some important Patriotes voted against this idea, including Louis-Joseph Papineau. Robert Nelson was made General of the army and elected future President of the Republic of Lower Canada.

On February 28, 1838, Nelson encamped at Alburg, Vermont with some 300 men. He proclaimed the independence of the Republic of Lower Canada and distributed copies of a declaration of independence. Soon after, they were arrested by the U.S. Army for violation of the law of neutrality of the United States. A jury, sympathetic to the Patriotes cause, acquitted him and others.

After this failed attempt, Robert Nelson and other insurrectionists decided to take the time to organize a new strike. A clandestine paramilitary association, known as the Frères chasseurs, was set up to overthrow the British colonial governments of Lower and Upper Canada and establish sovereign and democratic republics in their place. A second invasion started on November 3, 1838. Things didn't go as planned and the invasion forces were forced to retreat.

Nelson and others were eventually granted amnesty by the British colonial government and allowed to return home.

Robert Nelson died in 1873 at the age of 78 in Staten Island, New York. He was interred in the Notre-Dame-des-Neiges Cemetery in Montreal.

== Sources ==
- "Robert Nelson". Dictionary of Canadian Biography (online ed.). University of Toronto Press. 1979–2016.
- "The Frères Chasseurs" Canada: A People's History, CBC Television, accessed 2008-02-29
- Georges Aubin (1998). Robert Nelson. Déclaration d'indépendance et autres écrits, Montréal: Comeau & Nadeau, 90 pages (in French)
- Mélissa Blais and Benoit Marsan. Nelson, Robert, in Les Patriotes de 1837@1838, May 20, 2000 (in French)
- Mary Soderstrom. The Words on the Wall: Robert Nelson & the Rebellion of 1837, Ottawa: Oberon Press, 1998, 348 pages (an historical novel)
- François Labonté: Robert Nelson dit "le Diable". Face-à-face entre les Britanniques et les forces rebelles réfugiées aux États-Unis (1838 - 1839). Presses de l'Université Laval, 2017 (en français)
