= Lower Canada Rebellion =

1837–38 populist uprising against the government of Lower Canada (present-day Quebec)

Lower Canada Rebellions
- Part of the Rebellions of 1837–1838
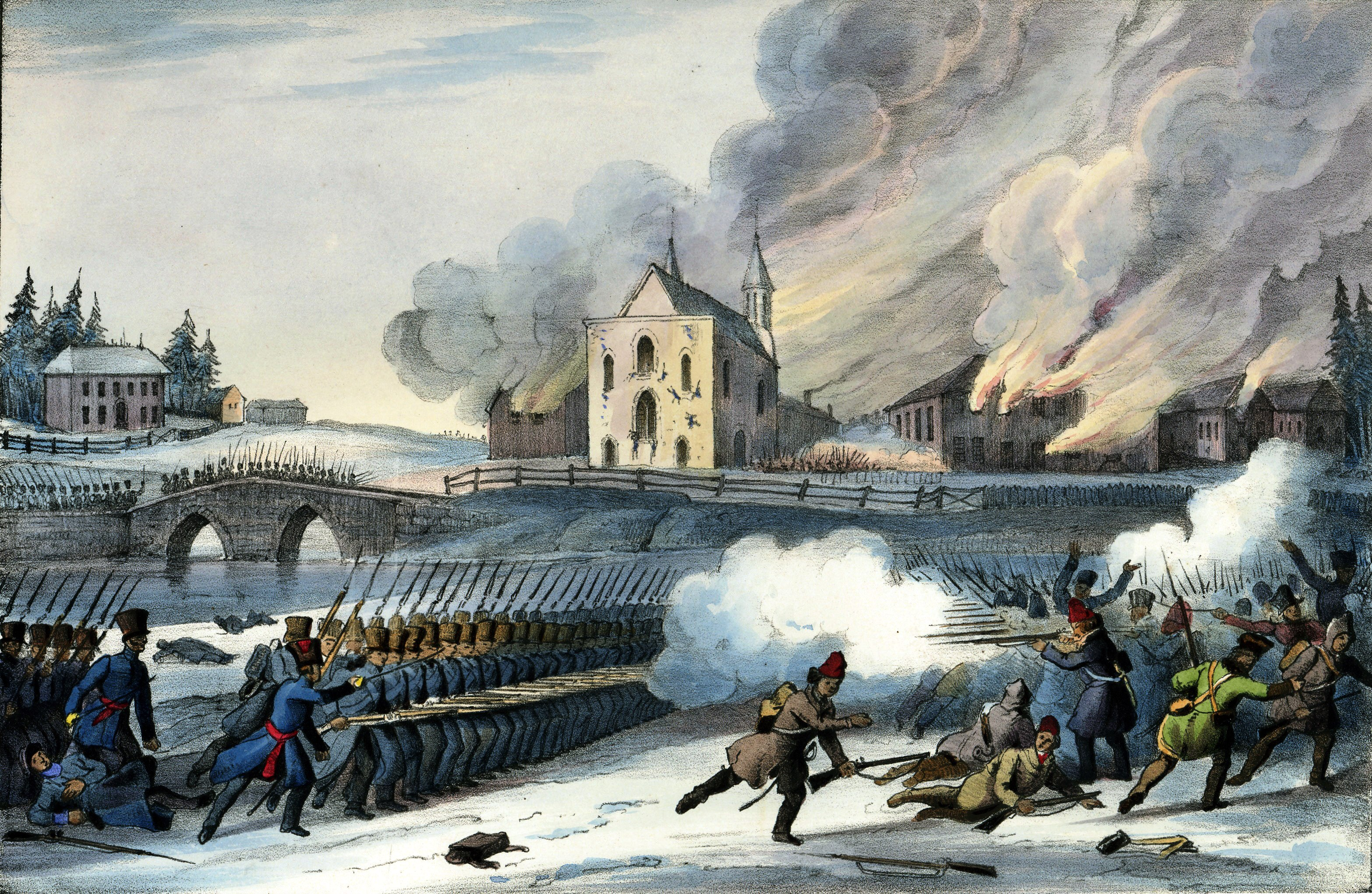
- The Battle of Saint-Eustache
Date	6 November 1837 – 10 November 1838 (1 year, 4 days)
Location	Lower Canada (present-day Quebec)
Result	Rebellion suppressed
Territorial changes	Unification of Lower Canada and Upper Canada into the Province of Canada

Belligerents
(United Kingdom of Great Britain and Ireland) British Empire; Lower Canada; Château Clique	Patriotes; Republic of Lower Canada (Note: From 22 February to 9 November, 1838.)

Commanders and leaders
(United Kingdom of Great Britain and Ireland) John Colborne; (United Kingdom of Great Britain and Ireland) Charles Gore; (United Kingdom of Great Britain and Ireland) George Wetherall; (United Kingdom of Great Britain and Ireland) James Macdonell; (United Kingdom of Great Britain and Ireland) John Clitherow; (United Kingdom of Great Britain and Ireland) Alexander Fraser; (United Kingdom of Great Britain and Ireland) Maximilien Globensky; (United Kingdom of Great Britain and Ireland) Lewis Odell; (United Kingdom of Great Britain and Ireland) Charles McAllister; (Lower Canada) John Scriver; (Lower Canada) O.J. Kempt; (Lower Canada) Hiram Moore	Thomas Brown; Jean Chénier †; Robert Nelson; Wolfred Nelson; Ferdinand Oklowski; Louis Papineau; François Lorimier (executed); James Perrigo; Joson Dumochelle; Cyrille Côté; Julien Gagnon (WIA); Pierre Narbonne

Strength
1,380 regulars, rising to 10,000 by mid-1838; 33,000 Canadian militia	≈4,100 Patriotes; 25,000 sympathizer militia

Casualties and losses
Total: 122; 68 killed; 47 wounded; 6 missing; 1 cannon lost	Total: 411; 157 killed; 25 wounded; 229 captured (Note: 29 were executed for treason, and 58 were deported to Australia.)

The Lower Canada Rebellion (French: rébellion du Bas-Canada), commonly referred to as the Patriots' Rebellion (Rébellion des patriotes) in French, is the name given to the armed conflict in 1837–38 between rebels and the British colonial government of Lower Canada (now southern Quebec). Together with the simultaneous rebellion in the neighbouring colony of Upper Canada (now southern Ontario), it formed the Rebellions of 1837–38 (rébellions de 1837–38).

As a result of the rebellions, the Province of Canada was created from the former Lower Canada and Upper Canada.

== History ==
The rebellion had been preceded by nearly three decades of efforts at political reform in Lower Canada, led from the early 1800s by James Stuart and Louis-Joseph Papineau, who formed the Parti patriote and sought accountability from the elected general assembly and the appointed governor of the colony. After the Constitutional Act 1791, Lower Canada could elect a House of Assembly, which led to the rise of two parties: the English Party and the Canadian Party. The English Party was mostly composed of the English merchants and bourgeoisie and had the support of bureaucrats and the old seigneurial families. The Canadian Party was formed by aristocrats, French or English. The Catholic Church did not openly advocate for any political party but tended to support the English party. With the power in the hand of the population, the French-Canadian business class needed support from the population more than from the British business class. Since the population was mostly French-Canadian, those elected to the House of Assembly tended to be French-speaking and to support the French-Canadian business class. The House of Assembly gave an illusion of power to French-Canadians, but the Executive and Legislative Councils advised the governor, who could veto any legislation. Both councils were made of people chosen by the English party. The appointed legislative council was dominated by a small group of businessmen known as the Château Clique, the equivalent of the Family Compact in Upper Canada.

In the early 19th century the economy of Lower Canada changed drastically. Logging became more important than agriculture and the fur trade, which worried those who worked in the fields. Activists in Lower Canada began to work for reform of the economic disfranchisement of the French-speaking majority and working-class English-speaking citizens. The rebellion opposed the colonial government's appointed upper house of the legislature. Many of those appointed were English-speaking. French speakers felt that English-speakers were disproportionately represented in the lucrative fields of banking, timber, and transportation.

Sir James Henry Craig, governor from 1807 to 1812, encountered multiple crises. He called elections three times in 16 months because he was not satisfied with the people elected even though they kept being re-elected. Craig thought that the Canadian Party and its supporters wanted a French-Canadian republic, and feared that if the United States invaded Lower Canada, the Canadian Party would collaborate. In 1810, Craig imprisoned journalists working for the Le Canadien newspaper, in particular Pierre-Stanislas Bédard, the leader of the Canadian Party and editor of the newspaper. That created a leadership crisis in the party.

During the War of 1812 many rumours circulated in the colony of a possible invasion. The French-Canadians depended on the protection of Britain, which created a certain unity in the colony during wartime.

At the same time, some among the English-speaking business elite advocated a union of Upper and Lower Canada to ensure competitiveness with the increasingly-large and powerful economy of the United States, while some rebels were inspired by the success of the American War of Independence. The British-appointed governor, George Ramsey, Earl of Dalhousie, favoured unification. In Lower Canada, the growing sense of nationalism among English- and the French-speaking citizens was organized into the Parti canadien, which, after 1826, was called the Parti patriote.

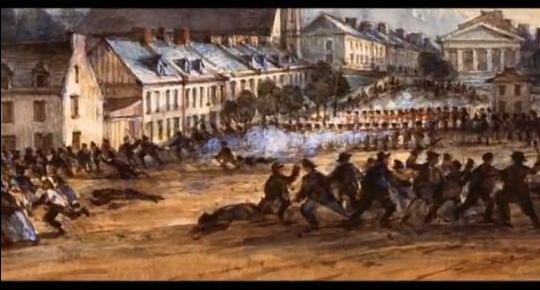
Louis-Joseph Papineau submitted his "Ninety-two Resolutions" after protesters were shot in Montreal.

In 1811, James Stuart became leader of the Parti canadien in the assembly and in 1815, reformer Louis-Joseph Papineau was elected as speaker. The elected assembly had little power since its decisions could be vetoed by either the legislative council and the governor, appointed by the British government. Dalhousie and Papineau were soon at odds over the issue of uniting the Canadas. Dalhousie forced an election in 1827, rather than accept Papineau as assembly speaker. Dalhousie mistakenly hoped that the elected members would change and then decided to prorogue the parliament. The population reacted by sending a petition signed by 87,000 people to London against Dalhousie. Reformers in England had Dalhousie reassigned to India, but the legislative council and the assembly were still unable to reach a compromise.

From 1828 to 1832, there was a brief calm, and the assembly was able to pass several important laws. In 1832, the Patriote newspapers published controversial articles about the Legislative Council, and both heads of the newspapers got arrested. That created a huge tension in the population against the British government, especially when the army shot three people in a crowd during a Montreal by-election in 1832 and nobody was arrested.

After hearing about the 99 grievances submitted by Robert Gourlay, Papineau wrote the "Ninety-two Resolutions" while he was secretly co-ordinating with Upper Canada. After protestors were shot in Montreal in 1832, Papineau had to submit the list of "resolutions" to the governor himself. The document that was presented to the House of Assembly on January 7, 1834, and had 92 demands to the British government. By 1834, the assembly had passed the Ninety-two Resolutions, outlining its grievances against the legislative council. The goal was to group all together, in a single document, the people's grievances. It was addressed to the British government to tell it the problems of the colony. The Patriotes were supported by an overwhelming majority of Lower Canada's population of all origins. There were popular gatherings all around the colony to sign a petition that was sent to London to show that the document was popular. In 1834, the Parti patriote swept the election by gaining more than three quarters of the popular vote.

When London received the resolutions, they asked Governor Lord Gosford to analyze it. At first, he was trying to attract the Patriotes away from Papineau and his influence. However, the same governor created a loyal militia made of volunteers to fight the Patriotes. In 1836, the government was able to vote some subsidies to the administration during the assembly because the assembly members from the City of Quebec decided to go against Papineau. The period of calm did not last long because a month later, Papineau found Gosford's secret instructions, which said that the British never planned on accepting the resolutions.

However, the reformers in Lower Canada were divided over several issues. A moderate reformer, John Neilson, had quit the party in 1830 and joined the Constitutional Association four years later. Papineau's anticlerical position alienated reformers in the Catholic Church, and his support for secular, rather than religious, schools resulted in opposition by the powerful Bishop, Jean-Jacques Lartigue, who called on all Catholics to reject the reform movement and to support the authorities, forcing many to choose between their religion and their political convictions.

In 1837, the Russell resolutions rejected all of the Patriotes' resolutions and gave the right to the governor to take subsidies without voting in the assembly. It also said that the legislative council would continue to be chosen by the Crown. The Russell Resolutions were adopted in Westminster by a huge majority.

== Organizing for armed conflict ==
Leaders of the Patriote movement approved the formation of the paramilitary Société des Fils de la Liberté during the Assembly of the Six Counties, in October 1837.

Papineau continued to push for reform. He petitioned the British government, but in March 1837 the administration of Lord Melbourne rejected all of Papineau's requests. After the Russell Resolutions were announced, the Patriotes used their newspapers to organize popular gatherings to inform people about their positions. They encouraged people to boycott British produce and illegally import goods from the United States. The gatherings took place all over Lower Canada, and thousands participated. Papineau attended most gatherings in the summer of 1837, to ensure that people would pressure the government only by political measures, such as the boycott of British produce.

Governor Gosford tried to forbid those gatherings but they were attended even by those loyal to him. At the end of the summer, many of Gosford's local representatives quit, in a show of support for the Patriotes. Gosford hired loyal people and tried to gain the Patriotes' trust by appointing seven French-Canadian members to the Legislative Assembly. In September and October 1837, a group of more radical Patriotes tried to intimidate the colonial government by going out into the street and rioting near the homes of certain loyalists. At the end of October, the largest of the Patriotes' gatherings took place in Saint-Charles, led by Wolfred Nelson. It lasted for two days and formed the Confédération des Six-Comtés.

Papineau organized protests and assemblies and eventually approved formation of the paramilitary Société des Fils de la Liberté during the Assembly of the Six Counties. In his last speech before the armed conflict, Papineau said that it was not yet time to fight. He thought that political actions could still avoid fighting. Wolfred Nelson made a speech immediately afterwards, saying that he disagreed with Papineau and thought that it was time to fight. After the Assembly of the Six Counties, the Patriotes were divided between supporters of Papineau and supporters of Nelson. On the other side, the supporters of the Russell Resolutions called a Constitutional Association led by Peter McGill and John Molson, and held gatherings around the province calling for government troops to return order to the colony.

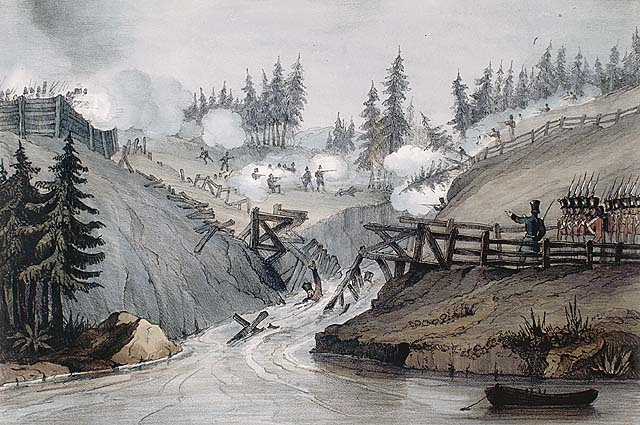
Government forces engage Patriote rebels during the rebellion.

On November 6, 1837, Les Fils de la Liberté were holding a meeting in Montreal, when the Doric Club began fighting with them and violence and vandalism broke out across the city of Montreal. Arrest warrants were issued for those responsible for the leaders of the Assembly of the Six Counties.

== Taking up arms ==
The first armed conflict occurred in 1837 when the 26 members of the Patriotes who had been charged with illegal activities chose to resist their arrest by the authorities under the direction of John Colborne. Arrest warrants against Papineau and other assembly members were issued. They left Montreal and hid in the countryside. Papineau escaped to the United States (later to return and serve in the Parliament). Other rebels organized in the countryside.

On November 16, Constable Malo travelled to Saint-Jean and arrested three Patriotes. About 150 Patriotes were waiting for them at Longueuil and liberated the prisoners. The victory affected the morale of the Patriotes, who knew that government troops would soon intervene. Although there was doubt the Patriotes were ready to fight regular soldiers, a rebel force, led by Wolfred Nelson, defeated a government force in the Battle of Saint-Denis on November 23, 1837. Nelson had 800 people fighting with him, half of them equipped with firearms. When confidence among the Patriote supporters wavered, Nelson threatened them to make sure they did not leave. To the surprise of many, Papineau was not there during the battle.

Government troops beat back the rebels two days later, defeating them at Saint-Charles. At the Battle of Saint-Charles, the Patriotes were defeated. General Brown was confident but was not a capable commander. There was no discipline in the camp. Different people offered him men, but he turned down all the offers. Once the battle started, Brown escaped the fight. After the Battle of Saint-Charles, Nelson tried to keep Saint-Denis safe, but knew there was no hope. The main leaders, including Papineau, O'Callaghan, and Nelson, left for the United States.

Meanwhile, On December 5, the government declared martial law in Montreal.

The rebellion ended at the Battle of Saint-Eustache on December 14, 1837. Between 500 and 600 Patriotes were ready to fight. The government forces were expecting strong resistance and so had brought 2,000 men. Most Patriote leaders were killed or fled during the battle. Many were arrested. The Battle of Saint-Eustache was a significant defeat. The defeat of the rebellions can be explained by the fact that the Patriotes were not quite ready to fight. When news of the arrest of the Patriote leaders reached Upper Canada, William Lyon Mackenzie launched an armed rebellion in December 1837.

== Patriots War and an abortive second uprising of Patriotes ==
After the insurrection, the government prepared for another armed conflict. It reorganized the whole structure, mostly in the urban areas like Montreal and Quebec. The government had 5,000 regular troops stationed in Lower Canada, and knew that the leaders of the Patriote movement were in the United States, so the government maintained contact with spies in the United States, and the American government kept their British counterparts informed of rebel activity. In February 1838, rebel leaders who had escaped across the border into the United States raided Lower Canada. During the summer of 1838, the Patriotes in the United States formed a secret society, called Frères chasseurs, to invade Lower Canada from the United States. The secret group also had members in Lower Canada itself, who would assist in the invasion. The goal was an independent state of Lower Canada.

Two major armed conflicts occurred when groups of Lower Canadian Patriotes, led by Robert Nelson, crossed the Canada–U.S. border in an attempt to invade Lower Canada and Upper Canada, overthrow the colonial government, and establish two independent republics. A second revolt began with the Battle of Beauharnois in November 1838, which was also suppressed by the British. The Frères Chasseurs had camps around Lower Canada, in which they were arming themselves. Their main camp was in Napierville. They had many participants but not enough weapons. They planned to take control of the road between the United States and Napierville, but were intercepted by volunteers. The Frères Chasseurs were defeated in 30 minutes. Shortly afterward, Robert Nelson and other members came from Napierville to take control of the same area. However, volunteers were already waiting and had help from the Loyal Rangers of Clarenceville. This time, the battle lasted longer, but the Frères Chasseurs were ultimately defeated. Then, three secondary camps were scattered very easily by armed volunteers.

Most Patriotes left the camps when they heard government forces approaching, and the latter were ultimately barely involved in the second uprising of the Patriotes. The British government subsequently dispatched Lord Durham to investigate the cause of the rebellion. His report in 1839 recommended that the Canadas be united into one colony (the Province of Canada) to assimilate the French-speaking Canadiens into English Canadian culture. For Durham, the fact that there were two groups (English and French) created a hostile environment. He thought that the way to solve to problems in Lower Canada was to assimilate the French-Canadians. He also recommended accepting the rebels' grievances by granting responsible government to the new colony.

== Aftermath ==
The green, white, and red tricolour used by the Parti patriote between 1832 and 1838.

After the first insurrection, the Pied-du-Courant Prison in Montreal was overfull. In July, Durham emptied it. When hostilities resumed in 1838, the prison filled with even more prisoners. Martial law was declared. This allowed the government to imprison people without reason. Ninety-nine prisoners from the second rebellion were sentenced to death. Twelve were hanged; the last hanging is dramatized in the 2001 film February 15, 1839. The government feared that the populace would sympathize with the prisoners. So, 141 prisoners from Lower and Upper Canada were instead sent to work camps in Australia. In Sydney two bays are named for Canadian internment camps for convicts involved in the Lower Canada Rebellion - Exile Bay and France Bay. In 1844, they were allowed to return. Although they had to pay for their fare home, most had returned by 1845.

After the military defeat of the Patriotes, Lower Canada was merged with Upper Canada under the Act of Union, passed by the British Parliament. The Canadiens had a narrow majority in the new province, but with continued emigration of English-speakers to Canada West, that dominance was short lived. Eight years after the Union, the coalition between Louis-Hippolyte LaFontaine and Robert Baldwin achieved elected responsible government in the Province of Canada. The instability of this new regime (see Joint Premiers of the Province of Canada) eventually led to the formation of the Great Coalition. 1867 brought another major constitutional change and the formation of the Canadian Confederation.

Joseph Schull, author of a book on the rebellion, (Note: Joseph Schull, Rebellion, Macmillan, 1972) once said:

"For the most part, in the writing of Canadian history in English, the Lower Canada Rebellion was more or less swept under the rug — as an unfortunate incident, perhaps, in the struggle for responsible government. It was a lot more than that. I don't think one can even begin to understand French Canada until the size and scope of its wounds in those troubles is realized...Some of the effects of that rebellion are still stamped on our national character and still eating at us."

The Lower Canada Rebellion, along with the Upper Canadian Rebellion, is often seen as an example of what might have occurred in the United States if the American Revolutionary War had failed. In Quebec, the rebellion, as well as the parliamentary and popular struggle, is now commemorated as the Journée nationale des Patriotes (National Patriots' Day) on the Canadian statutory holiday, Victoria Day. Since the late 20th century, the day has become a symbol for the Quebec independence movement and, to a lesser extent, a symbol of Canada's republican movement.

== Leaders ==
- Thomas Storrow Brown (1803–1888)
- Jean-Olivier Chénier (1806–1837)
- François-Marie-Thomas Chevalier de Lorimier (1803–1839)
- Amury Girod (1800–1837)
- James Ard (1802–1840)
- Edmund Bailey O'Callaghan (1797–1880)
- Robert Nelson (1794–1873)
- Wolfred Nelson (1791–1863)
- Louis-Joseph Papineau (1786–1871)

== See also ==
- History of Canada
- List of incidents of civil unrest in Canada
- Upper Canada Rebellion
- Timeline of Quebec history
- Politics of Quebec
- Canada Bay, New South Wales: some French Canadians who took part in the rebellions were expelled to this region of Australia.
- Kahnawake Iroquois and the Rebellions of 1837–38
- February 15, 1839
- Félix Poutré
- List of the 108 Lower Canadians prosecuted before the general court-martial of Montreal in 1838–39
