= Battle of Alavus =

1808 battle of the Finnish War

Coordinates: 62°35′11″N 23°36′57″E

- Part of the Finnish War
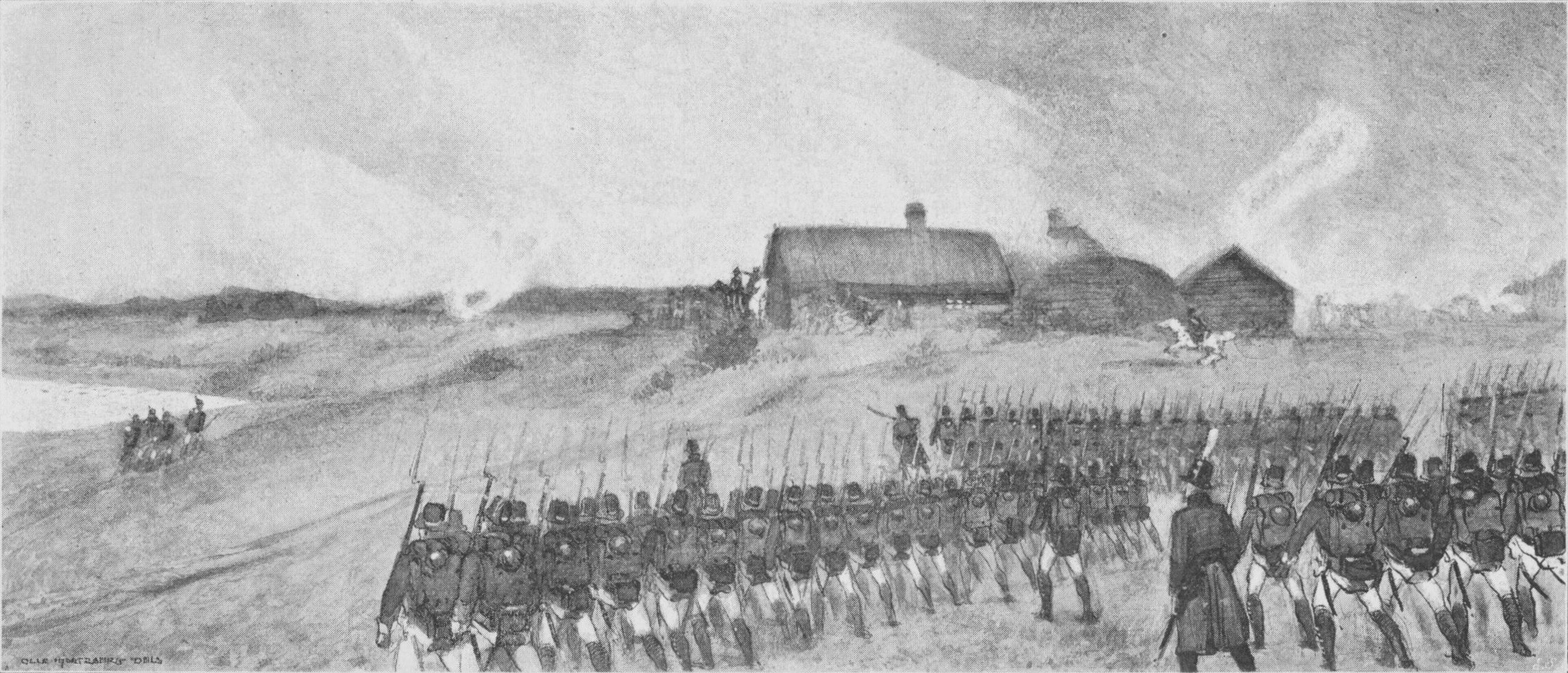
- The advance of the Finns at Alavus, by Magnus Adlercreutz
Date	17 August 1808
Location	Alavus, Finland, Kingdom of Sweden
Result	Swedish victory

Belligerents
Sweden	Russian Empire

Commanders and leaders
Carl Johan Adlercreutz	(Russian Empire) Ivan Matveyevich Erikson (Russian Empire) Ivan Vasilyevich Sabaneev

Strength
3,850; 12 guns	2,400; 8 guns

Casualties and losses
212 killed, wounded or captured	367 killed, wounded or captured

The Battle of Alavus took place on 17 August 1808 in the vicinity of the town of Alavus (Swedish: Alavo), as part of the Finnish War. The Finnish army, under the command of General Carl Johan Adlercreutz defeated a smaller Russian force and drove it southwards. It was the last in a string of Swedish successes during the summer of 1808, and marked the turning point in the war.

== Prelude ==
With his supply lines harassed by Swedish forces and retreating southward, the newly appointed general major Nikolay Kamensky decided to retake the initiative. The logistical situation precluded this however, and he was forced to march to Jämsä. Not until 7 August was he able to regain control of the situation, as Swedish raiding activities ebbed and reinforcements and fresh supplies started arriving. Kamenskiy then decided to renew his offensive. He sent a detachment under colonel Erikson toward Alavus and marched towards Jyväskylä.

Probably encouraged by the victory at the Battle of Kauhajoki, marshal Wilhelm Mauritz Klingspor ordered general Adlercreutz to attack the Russian position at Alavus. The army, much worn by the ordeals of the summer, was moved south on 16 August in pouring rain. The following day the weather cleared.

== The battle ==
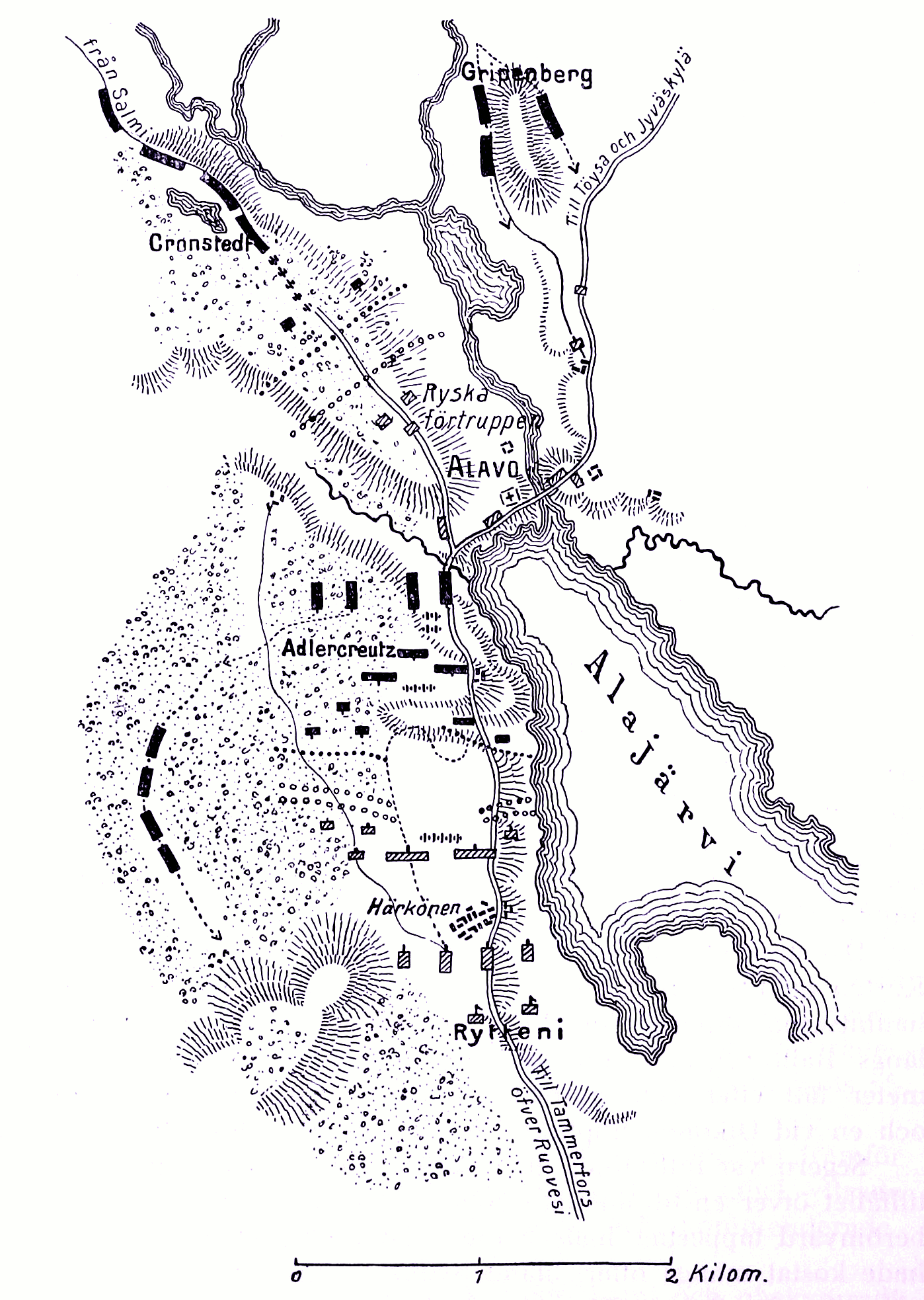
Positions at the battle

In bright sunshine, Adlercreutz attacked the Russian positions south of the Alavus Church, near the small village of Härkölä, protected by lake Alajärvi (now Alavudenjärvi or Kirkkojärvi) on his left and marshy ground on his right. The Russian counterattacked on their right wing and forced a battalion of Karelians on the Swedish left flank to retreat northwards. At this point Adlercreutz ordered the 3rd battalion of Savolax infantry regiment, supported by the 2nd battalion, to counterattack. After a barrage of gunfire, the battalion made a bayonet charge and threw back the Russians. The Russian left flank was also under pressure and started yielding; by 19.00 the entire Russian force had retired with casualties tallying 370 men, compared to 200 on the Swedish side.

== Aftermath ==
Despite the success, Klingspor never capitalized on it or the outcome of the Battle of Lapua and the difficult Russian supply situation in the summer of 1808. After the defeat at Alavus, Russian fortune turned and Kamensky was successful in his counteroffensive, which drove the Swedes ever further north.

== Citations and sources ==
=== Sources ===
- Finska kriget 1808–1809, Martin Hårdstedt (2006) (ISBN 91-518-4101-0).
- Hornborg, Eirik (1955). När riket sprängdes: fälttågen i Finland och Västerbotten, 1808–1809 (in Swedish). Stockholm: P. A. Norstedts och Söners Förlag.
