= Battle of Revolax =

1808 battle of the Finnish War

- Part of the Finnish War
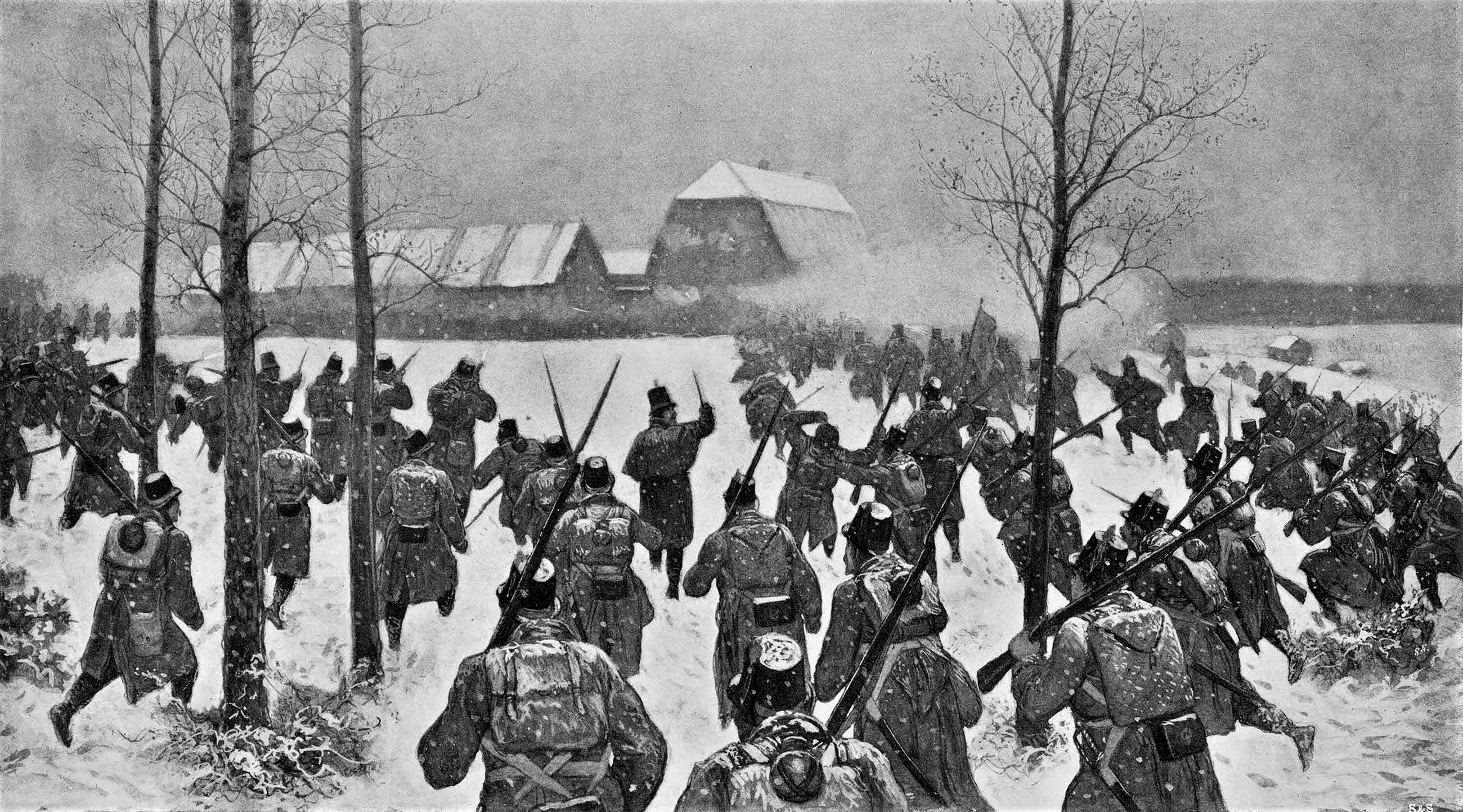
- Anfallet vid Revolaks, by August Malmström
Date	27 April 1808
Location	Revonlahti, Northern Ostrobothnia, Finland
Result	Swedish victory

Belligerents
Sweden	Russian Empire

Commanders and leaders
Carl Johan Adlercreutz; Johan Adam Cronstedt	(Russian Empire) Michail Leontievich Bulatov (POW)

Strength
2,400	1,500–1,700

Casualties and losses
130 killed, wounded or captured	500–600 killed, wounded or captured

The Battle of Revolax (Finnish: Revonlahden taistelu) took place on 27 April 1808 at Revonlahti (Swedish: Revolax), now part of Siikajoki, Finland, when the Swedish supreme commander Wilhelm Mauritz Klingspor and the Savolax brigade under Colonel Johan Adam Cronstedt, a total of about 2,400 Swedes surprised an isolated Russian column of about 1,700 men under Major General Michail Leontievich Bulatov. The Russians were surrounded and tried to cut their way through but failed and the Russian general Bulatov was taken prisoner by the Swedes.

This, and the preceding battle of Siikajoki nine days earlier, are considered very important events since they are the first Swedish victories after about 2 months of planned retreat. The next battle took place at Pulkkila on 2 May.

== The summer offensive begins ==
The Swedish commander Klingspor continued his retreat towards Oulu after the Swedish victory at the Battle of Siikajoki. They were closely followed by the Russians. A Russian fore, commanded by Bulatov, had set camp at the village of Revonlahti. Cronstedt prepared an assault to drive them away. He led a force of some 1,800 men through the night of 26 and 27 April. The Swedes could hear the sound of musket fire to the north, where Adlercreutz were fighting against the forward Russian unit which had been advancing on him. However Adlercreutz managed to stop the advance.

Positions at the battle

Cronstedt and his 4th Brigade prepared themselves for the battles that were to be fought the next day. Bulatov and his Russian troops were entrenched inside the village. The Russian units consisted also of the Mogilev Regiment and the Perm Regiment. The Russians had three guns. In the morning of 27 April the Swedish attacked with two equally strong columns: the right column was led by Gustav Aminoff. It consisted of two battalions from the Savolax Infantry Regiment, the third battalion from the Savolax Jaeger Regiment, the second battalion of the Carelian Jaeger Corps and two 3-pound guns; the left column was led by Lieutenant Colonel Adolf Ludwig Christiern and consisted of two battalions from the Savolax Infantry Regiment, the first battalion from the Savolax Jaegar Regiment, the first battalion from the Carelian Jaeger Corps, and two 3-pounder guns.

The right column managed to sweep away all the Russian resistance and were advancing along the river, towards the village. At the same time, the left column prepared its troops to assault the vicarage, where Bulatov had set up his headquarters and gathered most of his troops. The attack on the vicarage became a difficult operation, as the Russians defended themselves viciously. The Swedes finally stormed the building at 10 a.m. and a bloody close-combat battle ensued.

More than 94 Swedes and 500 Russians had died, were wounded or captured when the violence finally ended. The Swedish victory at Revolax meant the end of the first Swedish retreat. Klingspor, who was known to be a cautious and sceptical man, acted against his temperament, and ordered a counter-offensive towards the south. The Savolax Brigade, which was led by av Sandels, and of whom Cronstedt's men were a part of, were to fight a bloody war in the southern parts of Finland. Sandel's newly formed 5th Brigade would soon take commence resistance fighting in the eastern parts of Finland. The Swedish counter offensive had begun and it would continue all the summer of 1808.

== See also ==
- Finnish War

== Notes, citations and sources ==
=== Sources ===
- Hornborg, Eirik (1955). När riket sprängdes: fälttågen i Finland och Västerbotten, 1808-1809 (in Swedish). Stockholm: P. A. Norstedts och Söners Förlag.
