= Skirmish at Peltokorpi =

1808 Russo-Swedish engagement

- Part of the Finnish War
Date	13 May 1808
Location	Peltokorpi, Finland
Result	Swedish victory

Belligerents
Sweden	Russian Empire

Commanders and leaders
Arvid Adolf Spåre	Unknown (POW)

Units involved
Tavastehus regiment	Unknown

Strength
30 men	125 men

Casualties and losses
Unknown	7 captured Several killed and wounded

The skirmish at Peltokorpi occurred on 13 May 1808 during the Finnish War, when a Swedish force of 30 men attacked a larger Russian one at Peltokorpi. The Swedes assaulted a smaller guard force first, capturing its underofficer and his horse, before attacking the larger main force, where they managed to kill and wound several. Arvid Adolf Spåre would eventually return to Himango where he was promoted to an officer.

== Background ==
On 13 May, a detachment of 30 men from the Tavastehus regiment under the command of Sergeant Arvid Adolf Spåre was sent from Himanko to do reconnaissance on the Russian right flank. Spåre succeeded in bypassing several Russian posts and eventually crossed the Kelviå river.

== Skirmish ==
After crossing the Kelviå, Spåre advanced to Peltokorpi, a village around 15 kilometers from Karleby. In the village, he encountered a Russian force of 25 cossacks, 25 hussars, and 40 jäger. The Russians also had a guard of 20 jäger and 10 cavalry, from which an underofficer and 4 cavalry had been sent out for reconnaissance. Spåre quickly attacked the Russians in an assault, managing to capture the underofficer and his horse. Soon after, he saw that he would himself be attacked, and assaulted the main Russian force. He successfully unsettled the Russians to a point where the 23rd Jäger regiment was dispatched from Korplaks to support the Russians. During his attack on the main force, he managed to kill and wound several Russians, capturing 2 hussars, and 4 jäger's.

== Aftermath ==
When he learned of the Jäger regiment's position, Spåre withdrew back to Himanko without suffering any casualties, bringing with him 7 prisoners and 4 horses. For his conduct, he was appointed as an officer.

== Works cited ==
- Generalstaben (1902). Sveriges krig åren 1808 och 1809 [Sweden's wars in the years of 1808 and 1809] (in Swedish). Vol. 3. Stockholm: Generalstaben krigshistoriska avdelning.
- Montgomery, Gustaf Adolf (1842). Historia öfver Kriget emellan Sverige och Ryssland åren 1808 och 1809 [History of the War between Sweden and Russia in the years 1808 and 1809] (in Swedish). Örebro: N.M. Lindhs Boktryckeri.
- Mankell, Julius (1870). Anteckningar rörande finska arméens och Finlands krigshistoria [Notes on the military history of the Finnish Army and Finland] (in Swedish). Vol. 2. Stockholm: P.A. Norstedt & Söner.
