= Yakov Kulnev =

Russian military leader

Yakov Petrovich Kulnev
- Яковъ Петровичъ Кульневъ (Note: Pre-1918 Russian orthography)
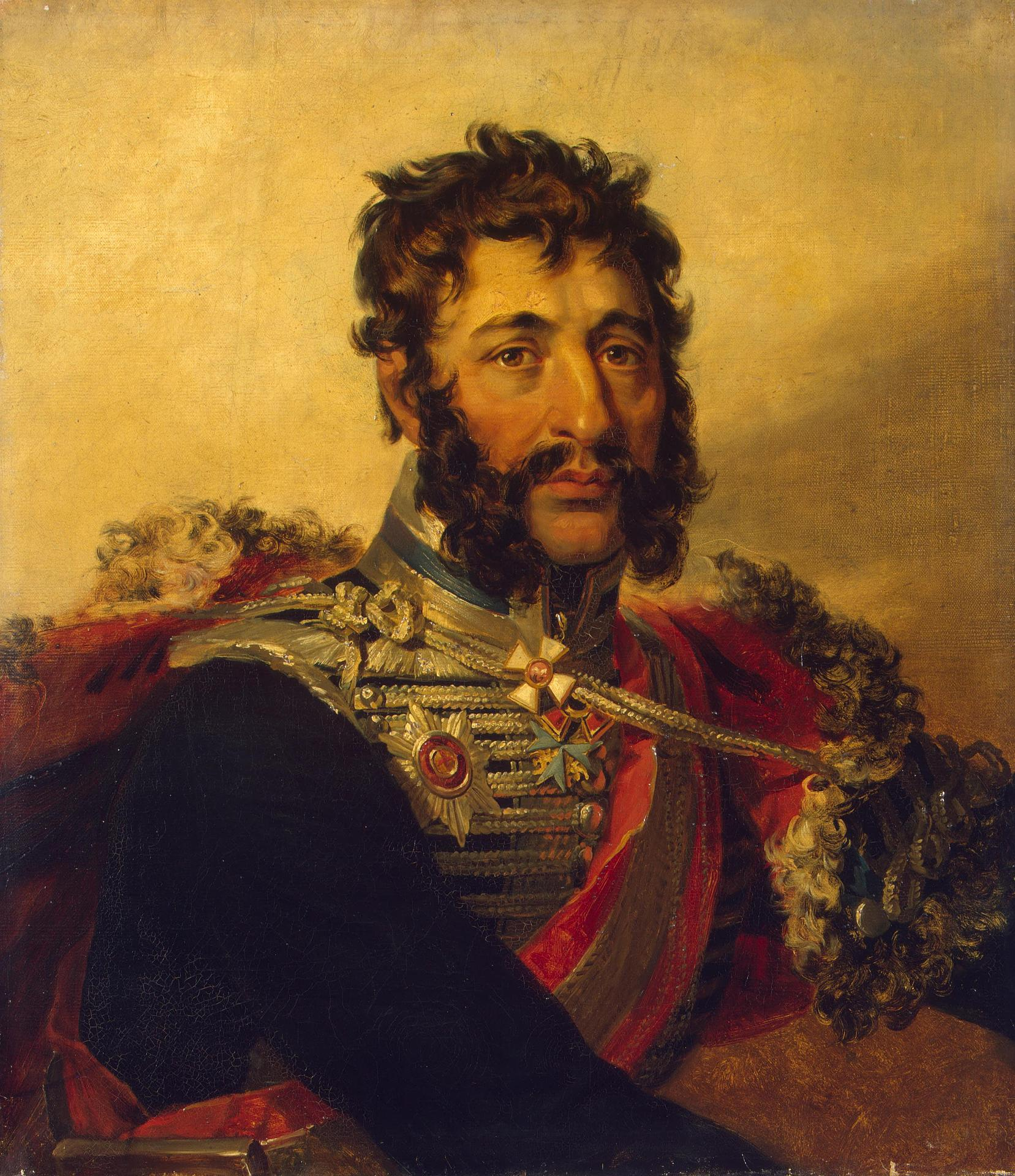
- Posthumous portrait by George Dawe and studio, c. 1820–1825, oils; Winter Palace, St. Petersburg
- Born: 5 August 1763; Lucyn, Inflanty Voivodeship, Polish–Lithuanian Commonwealth (Present Day Ludza, Latvia)
- Died: 1 August 1812 (aged 48); Klyastitsy, Vitebsk Governorate, Russian Empire (present day Belarus)
- Relatives: House of Kulnev [ru]
- Military career
- Allegiance: Russian Empire
- Rank: Major-General
- Conflicts: Russo-Turkish War (1787–1792); Kościuszko Uprising; Finnish War; Battle of Pyhäjoki; Battle of Siikajoki; Russo-Turkish War (1806–1812); Patriotic War of 1812; Battle of Vilkomir (1812); Battle of Klyastitsy
- Awards: St. George 3rd class (1808)

Yakov Petrovich Kulnev (Russian: Я́ков Петро́вич Ку́льнев; 5 August 1763 – 1 August 1812 (Note: Old Style: 25 Jul. 1763 – 20 Jul. 1812)) was, along with Pyotr Bagration and Aleksey Yermolov, one of the most popular Russian military leaders at the time of the Napoleonic Wars. Count Alexander Suvorov's admirer and participant of 55 battles, he lost his life during Napoleon's invasion of Russia.

== Early campaigns ==
Kulnev's father was a Russian Cavalry officer of lesser noble background who served in the Kargopol Regiment of Dragoons. The future general was born in Lucyn (present-day Latvia), of which his father was afterwards a Mayor, and matriculated at the Infantry School for Nobility in 1785.

He joined a hussar regiment and, under Suvorov's command, took part in the Russo-Turkish War, 1787-1792, and the Polish Campaign of 1794-1795 inclusive of the Brześć and Praga (Warsaw) battles. The following decade of his life is obscure.

In 1807 Kulnev was put in charge of the regiment of Hrodna hussars fighting against Napoleon. He made a name for himself at Heilsberg and Friedland, where he famously fought his way out of an encirclement.

== Finnish campaign ==
In the Finnish War against Sweden, Kulnev led Buxhoevden's vanguard. For his part in the storming of Jakobstad he was awarded a golden sabre. He encouraged guerrilla fighting and fought with distinction at Lapua, Kuortane, Oravais — three engagements which earned him Order of Saint George and the rank of Major General. Kulnev also won a notable victory at Pyhäjoki in the early part of the war, but was defeated by a much larger Swedish force at Siikajoki. Denis Davydov, who fought under his command in Finland, described Yakov Kulnev's exploits in his memoirs.

Kulnev crowned the campaign by leading Bagration's vanguard across the frozen Baltic Sea towards the Åland Islands and thence to Grisslehamn, within 70 km from the Swedish capital, Stockholm. This daring manoeuvre forced the Swedes to seek peace at any cost.

== Turkish campaign ==
Awarded for his courage with Order of Saint Anna of the 1st Degree, Kulnev was invited to take charge of the vanguard of the Danube Army which fought against the Turks in Bulgaria.

During the Turkish Campaign of 1810, Kulnev was one of Russia's ablest generals. His bold leadership made itself felt at Shumla, Nikopol, Rousse, and Batin, giving the campaign a character of decision it had been lacking heretofore.

A conflict with the commander-in-chief, Nikolay Kamensky, forced him to leave the army, however.

== War of 1812 ==
After Napoleon invaded Russia in 1812, Kulnev was entrusted with defending the roads leading to the capital, Saint Petersburg. On July 3, his detachment took prisoner a French general and 200 cavalrymen.

On 18 July, he led 5,000 cavalrymen — who formed a vanguard of Wittgenstein's corps — against Marshal Oudinot in the Battle of Klyastitsy. Taking prisoner 900 enemy soldiers, Kulnev crossed the Drissa River and clashed with a major French contingent. As the Russians came under heavy artillery fire, Kulnev was struck in the legs by a cannonball and lost both limbs. He died from the effects of wounds received at this engagement.

== Assessment ==
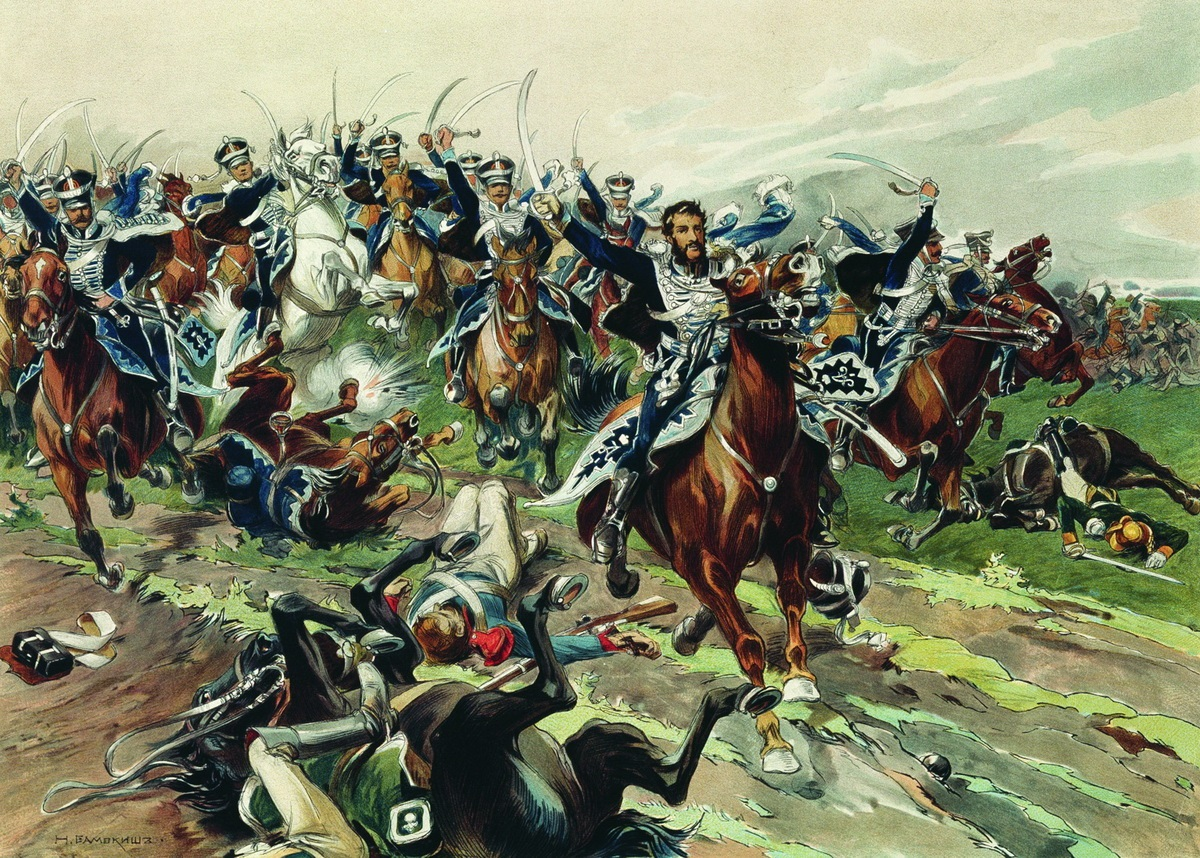
Kulnev at Klyastitsy on 1 August 1812, by Samokish

Although he did not live to take part in the Battle of Borodino and other famous battles of the Patriotic War, Kulnev was long remembered as a tough, impetuous, hot-tempered fighter. In 1830, the spot of his death was marked by a monument, with Zhukovsky's epitaph inscribed on it. In 1909, a hussar regiment was given his name. He died five days before his 49th birthday.

A typical Romantic hero of the Napoleonic Wars, he emancipated his serfs and was reputed to live in poverty, in order to emulate the soldiers of Roman antiquity that were his ideal. It has been suggested that Dubrovsky, a protagonist of Pushkin's eponymous novel, was modeled on Kulnev: Dubrovsky is described in the text as "a dark, swarthy 35-year-old, with a moustache and a beard, a genuine portrait of Kulnev". The Russian general is also the subject of Runeberg's poem Kulneff (1848), which is part of The Tales of Ensign Stål:

The Russian host could vaunt the name Of many a seasoned veteran Recorded on the scroll of fame Before our war began. Barclay, Kamensky, Bagration, Were household names to every son of Finland. When they hove in sight, We could expect a fight.

But Kulnev's name was new to all Before the flame of war was blown And he came rushing like a squall, Scarce dreamed of before known. He struck like lightning from the blue So terrible and yet so new, But ne'er to be forgot, we felt, From the first blow he dealt.

English translation by Charles Wharton Stork

== Sources of information ==
- "КУЛЬНЕВ • Great Russian Encyclopedia – Electronic version". old.bigenc.ru. 2016.
- Kovalevsky, N. F. (1997). История государства Российского. Жизнеописания знаменитых военных деятелей XVIII – начала XX века. Moscow.
