= Gustaf Adolf Montgomery =

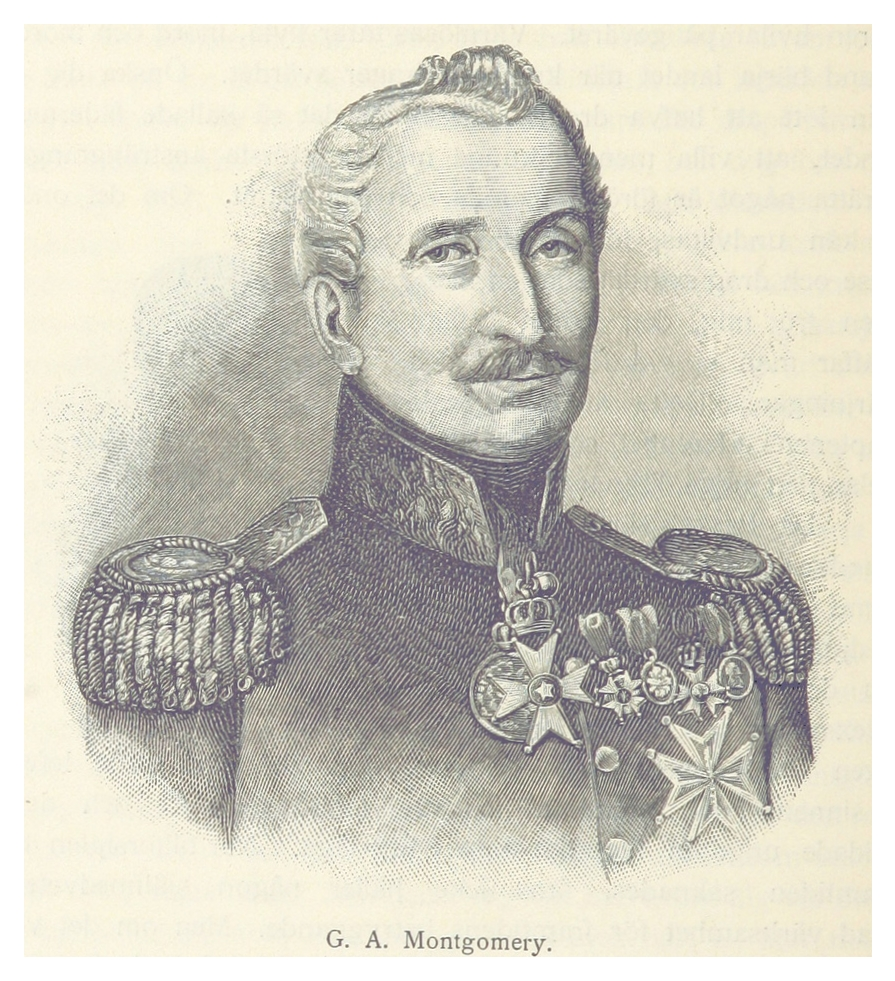

Gustaf Adolf Montgomery (1790–1861) was a Finnish colonel. Born in Finland before the separation of the Grand Duchy of Finland from Sweden, he was old enough to take part in the Finnish War (1808–09) on the losing Swedish/Finnish side. He served as an adjutant in the army of general Carl Johan Adlercreutz.

In 1848 he published a book, Historia öfver kriget emellan Sverige och Ryssland 1808 och 1809, critical of the Swedish leadership and praising the Russians. This book was the basis of The Tales of Ensign Stål by Johan Ludvig Runeberg.
