= Carl Johan Adlercreutz =

Swedish general and statesman (1757–1815)

General Carl Johan Adlercreutz
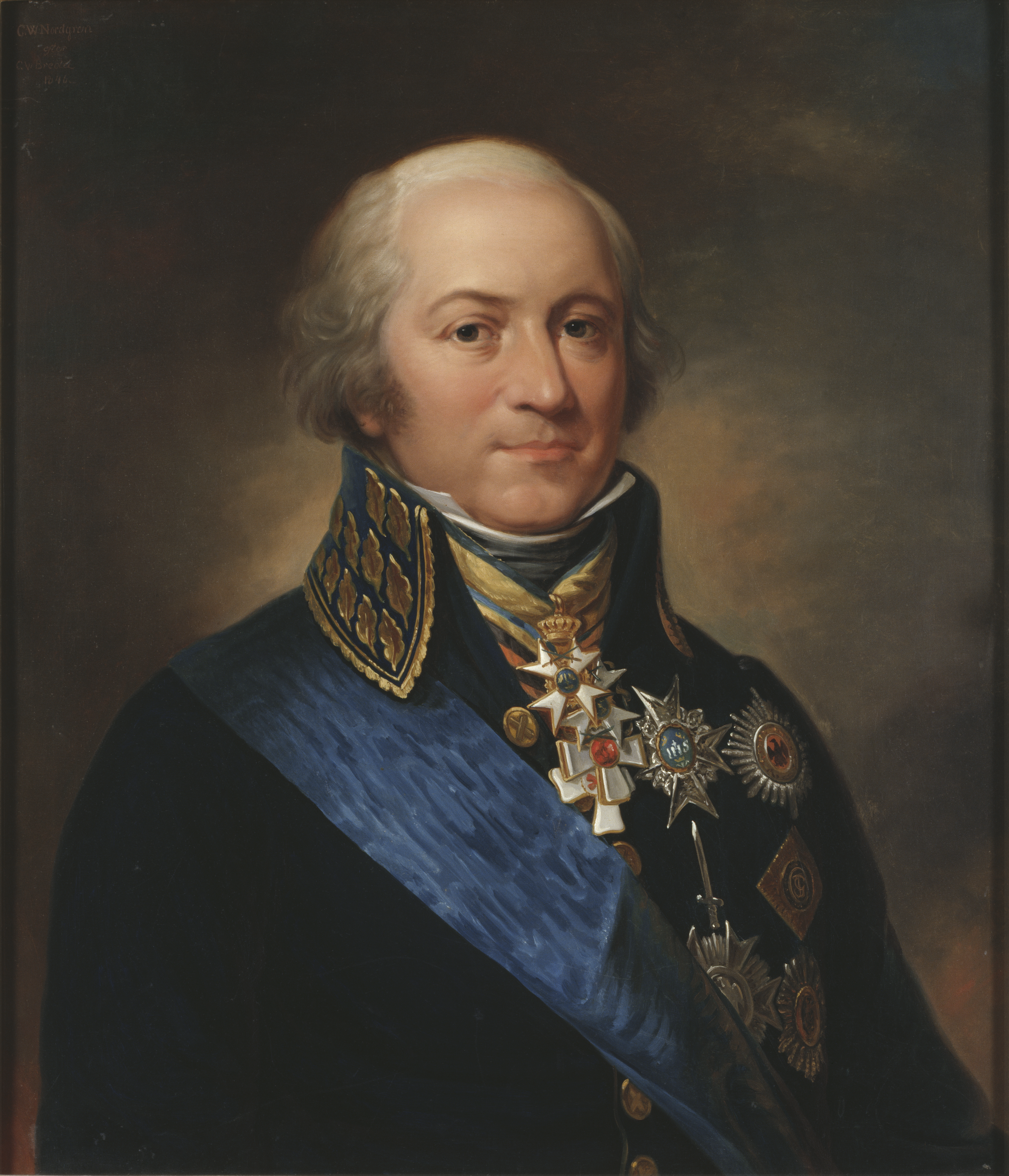
- Portrait by Carl Wilhelm Nordgren, 1846
- Born: 27 April 1757; Borgå (Porvoo), Finland, Sweden
- Died: 21 August 1815 (aged 56)
- Burial place: Riddarholm Church
- Military career
- Allegiance: Sweden
- Branch: Swedish Army
- Service years: 1770–1815
- Rank: General
- Conflicts: Russo-Swedish War of 1788–1790; Siege of Nyslott; Battle of Porrassalmi; Battle of Pundala; Second battle of Porrassalmi; Battle of Kilpakoski; Battle of Pirtimäki; Finnish War; Battle of Artsjö; Battle of Käkelä; Battle of Tammerfors; Battle of Siikajoki; Battle of Revolax; Battle of Nykarleby; Battle of Lapua; Battle of Alavus; Battle of Ruona–Salmi; Battle of Ylistaro; Battle of Oravais; Battle of Viiret; War of the Sixth Coalition; Battle of Großbeeren; Battle of Dennewitz; Battle of Leipzig; Swedish-Norwegian War of 1814

Carl Johan Adlercreutz (27 April 1757 – 21 August 1815) was a Swedish general and statesman, born in Borgå (Porvoo), Finland on family estates. Entering the Swedish army aged 13 in the Finnish Light Cavalry Brigade, he was present when Gustav III launched his coup-d’état. He studied military theory in Stockholm.

In 1777 he joined the Savo Brigade guarding the Finnish border against Russian aggression. Adlercreutz first saw action in the 1788–1790 Russo-Swedish War, where he distinguished himself. He was promoted Major in 1791 and Squadron Commander 1792. During the Anjala conspiracy he not only remained faithful to the King but actively refused to join the conspirators, subsequently taking part in the trials against them. He was thereafter appointed the commanding officer of the Nyland Dragoons, holding this post until 1804, when he was made Ofverste (Colonel-in-Chief) of the newly raised Adlercreutz Regiment.

His rise through the ranks was remarkable for the era. Advancement at this time depended heavily on powerful patrons and connections at court — something Adlercreutz largely lacked, despite being brother-in-law to Colonel Johan Adam Cronstedt and having married into the Swedish high nobility. His career advancement was therefore essentially his own achievement.

== Finnish War of 1808 ==
At the opening of the Finnish War Adlercreutz was appointed Ofverste commanding the 2nd brigade under Klercker. He replaced Gustaf Löwenhielm as Wilhelm Mauritz Klingspor's Chief of Staff on 14 April. Since Klingspor was more concerned with securing supplies and provisions than with conducting military operations, it was in practice Adlercreutz who directed the Swedish forces throughout the Finnish campaign.

Adlercreutz distinguished himself in action at Siikajoki, 18 April, and at Revolax, 27th. At Siikajoki, Adlercreutz acted on his own initiative against the prevailing opinion of the war council: while the majority wished to hasten the retreat, he considered this dishonourable and chose to give battle without orders — a decision that ended in Swedish victory. On 24 June he forced the Russians from Nykarleby. As CO of the Northern 'Army' he drove Raevsky from Lapua in a brilliant action on 14 July, then defeated the Russians again at Alavus in August. At the end of that month he was appointed to command the 'Finnish' Division under Klingspor. Forced to retreat due to the Swedish victories not being exploited, he was severely defeated by Nikolay Kamensky at the Battle of Oravais 14 September, which obliged him to abandon Finland.

However, Adlercreutz can reasonably be criticised for failing to reinforce Lieutenant Colonel von Fieandt's detachment before the Russian attack at Karstula, despite having had the opportunity to do so. The loss at Karstula cancelled out the victory at Alavus and forced Adlercreutz to withdraw northward.

During the fighting that preceded Oravais, Adlercreutz showed personal courage at Salmi near Kuortane, where after being surrounded by the enemy he cut his way back to his own lines sword in hand.

At Oravais, Adlercreutz led his troops in a frontal assault on the enemy centre with initial success, but the Russians prevailed through outflanking manoeuvres and the deployment of fresh reserves. The Swedish troops, having fought from the outset, were exhausted more quickly than the Russians, and this proved decisive.

As a consequence of the loss of Finland his estates were confiscated.

== Coup d'état and subsequent career ==
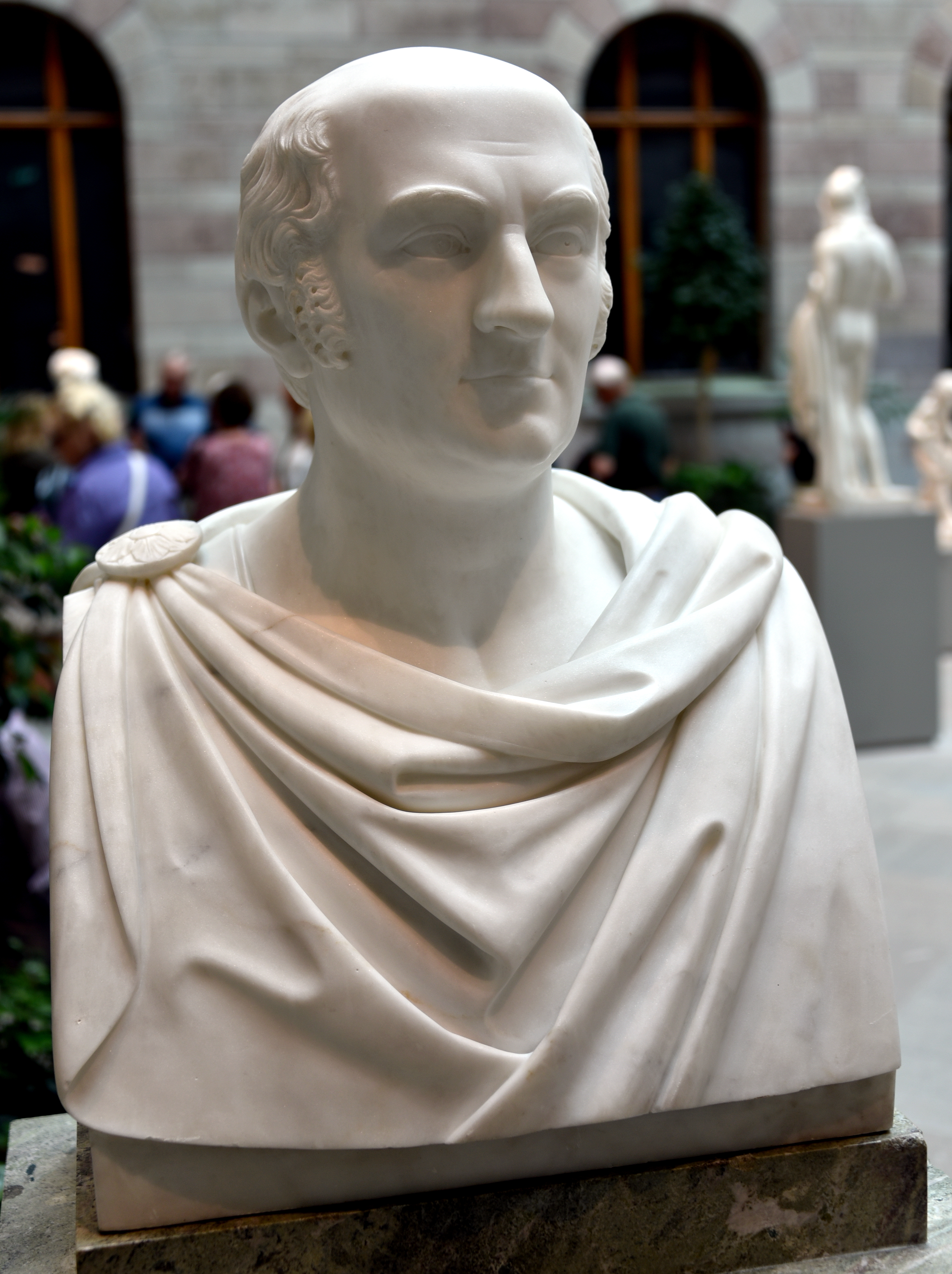
Carl Johan Adlercreutz, count, officer, and statesman, by Johan Niklas Bystroms. Marble. Nationalmuseum, Stockholm, Sweden

Adlercreutz returned to Stockholm to take charge of a military junta ruling the country in place of the insane King Gustav IV Adolf after the Coup of 1809. He long hesitated before agreeing to participate in the conspiracy against the king. It was above all the risk of civil war — the king was planning to march at the head of loyal troops against Stockholm — that ultimately led him to join the conspirators. With Georg Adlersparre, on 13 March 1809 at the head of the Junta he arrested the King and seized power. Adlercreutz proposed that he himself should be made king, but Gustav Adolf's uncle, Charles XIII was made king and the French Marshal Jean Baptiste Bernadotte was chosen instead as Crown Prince and heir to the throne. Later the two generals quarreled, and Adlersparre was disgraced, while Adlercreutz remained in favor, elected Count and took a seat in the Government. Although Finnish by birth he chose to remain in Sweden and in Swedish service after the severance of Finland from Sweden.

In 1813 Adlercreutz was made General and appointed Chief of Staff to Curt von Stedingk under the Crown Prince's Swedish Army of the North in Germany 1813. He served at the Battle of Leipzig 16–19 October, and was made a Commander of the Austrian Order of Maria Theresa, 88/144 promotion 1813–1814. His relationship with Crown Prince Karl Johan, who held the real power, was never close. A significant reason was Adlercreutz's opposition to the Crown Prince's pro-Russian foreign policy, which aimed at improving Sweden's relations with its eastern neighbour.

== Personal life ==
Adlercreutz's parents were the cornet Thomas Adlercreutz and Hedvig Katarina Barthéels.

In 1792, Adlercreutz married Baroness Henrietta Amalia Stackelberg (1771–1796), daughter of Lieutenant General Bernt Fredrik Johan Stackelberg and Virginia Sofia Adlerberg. He married again in 1798 to Margareta von Engeström, daughter of bergsrådet Gustaf von Engeström and Abela Charlotta Lagerbring. He was the father of Fredrik Adlercreutz and uncle of Axel Gustav Adlercreutz
