= Battle of Siikajoki =

1808 battle of the Finnish War

- Part of the Finnish War
- Positions at the battle
Date	18 April 1808
Location	Siikajoki, near Uleåborg, Finland
Result	Swedish victory

Belligerents
Sweden	Russian Empire

Commanders and leaders
Carl Johan Adlercreutz; Georg Carl von Döbeln	(Russian Empire) Yakov Petrovich Kulnev (Russian Empire) Andrey Petrovich Turchaninov

Strength
6,000–7,000	2,000–2,400

Casualties and losses
205 killed, wounded or captured	387 killed, wounded or captured

The Battle of Siikajoki (Finnish: Siikajoen taistelu) was fought between Swedish and Russian troops on 18 April 1808 at Siikajoki, approximately 60 km south of Uleåborg, Swedish Finland (today Oulu, Republic of Finland). During the first stage of the Finnish War, the Swedish commander Wilhelm Mauritz Klingspor had decided to retreat from southern Finland, so that the Swedes would gain time, and more troops could be moved to Finland via Tornio. The retreat was also made in an effort to delay battles until the seas thawed, and to reserve troops in case the Danes took the opportunity to attack Sweden.

The Battle of Pyhäjoki, which had been fought two days earlier, was one of the first skirmishes of the war, but Siikajoki was the first major attempt to stop the advancing Russians. Carl Johan Adlercreutz had been appointed commander after Count Gustaf Löwenhielm had been captured by the Russian at Pyhäjoki. The force commanded by Georg Carl von Döbeln was trying to cross the Siikajoki River when the Russians caught up with his force. Von Döbeln decided to take a stance on the south bank of the river. He first ordered a counterattack, but was forced to pull back. At that point the Russian center opened up and the newly appointed General-Adjutant Adlercreutz ordered another attack, which threw the Russians back and halted their advance.

The Battle of Siikajoki is described in the poem "Adlercreutz" in Runeberg's epic Tales of Ensign Stål.

The Nyland Regiment distinguished themselves at the battle, and today the Siikajoki Cross can be worn by soldiers of the Nyland Brigade, which is the traditional heir, though now part of the Finnish Navy.

== Swedish regiments ==
=== 1st Brigade ===
- Åbo Infantry Regiment (3 battalions)
- Nyland Infantry Regiment (1 battalion)
- Nyland Jägers (1 company)
- Nyland Dragoon Regiment (2 squadrons)
- Finnish Artillery Regiment

=== 2nd Brigade ===
- Björneborg Infantry Regiment (3 battalions)
- Österbotten Infantry Regiment (1 battalion and 1 company)
- Nyland Dragoon Regiment (2 squadrons)
- Finnish Artillery Regiment

=== 3rd Brigade ===
- Tavastehus Infantry Regiment (3 battalions)
- Nyland Infantry Regiment (1 battalion)
- Nyland Dragoon Regiment (3 squadrons)
- Finnish Artillery Regiment

== Citations and sources ==
=== Sources ===
- Hornborg, Eirik (1955). När riket sprängdes: fälttågen i Finland och Västerbotten, 1808-1809 (in Swedish). Stockholm: P. A. Norstedts och Söners Förlag.
