= Battle of Lapua =

1808 battle of the Finnish War

Coordinates: 62°58′N 23°01′E

- Part of the Finnish War
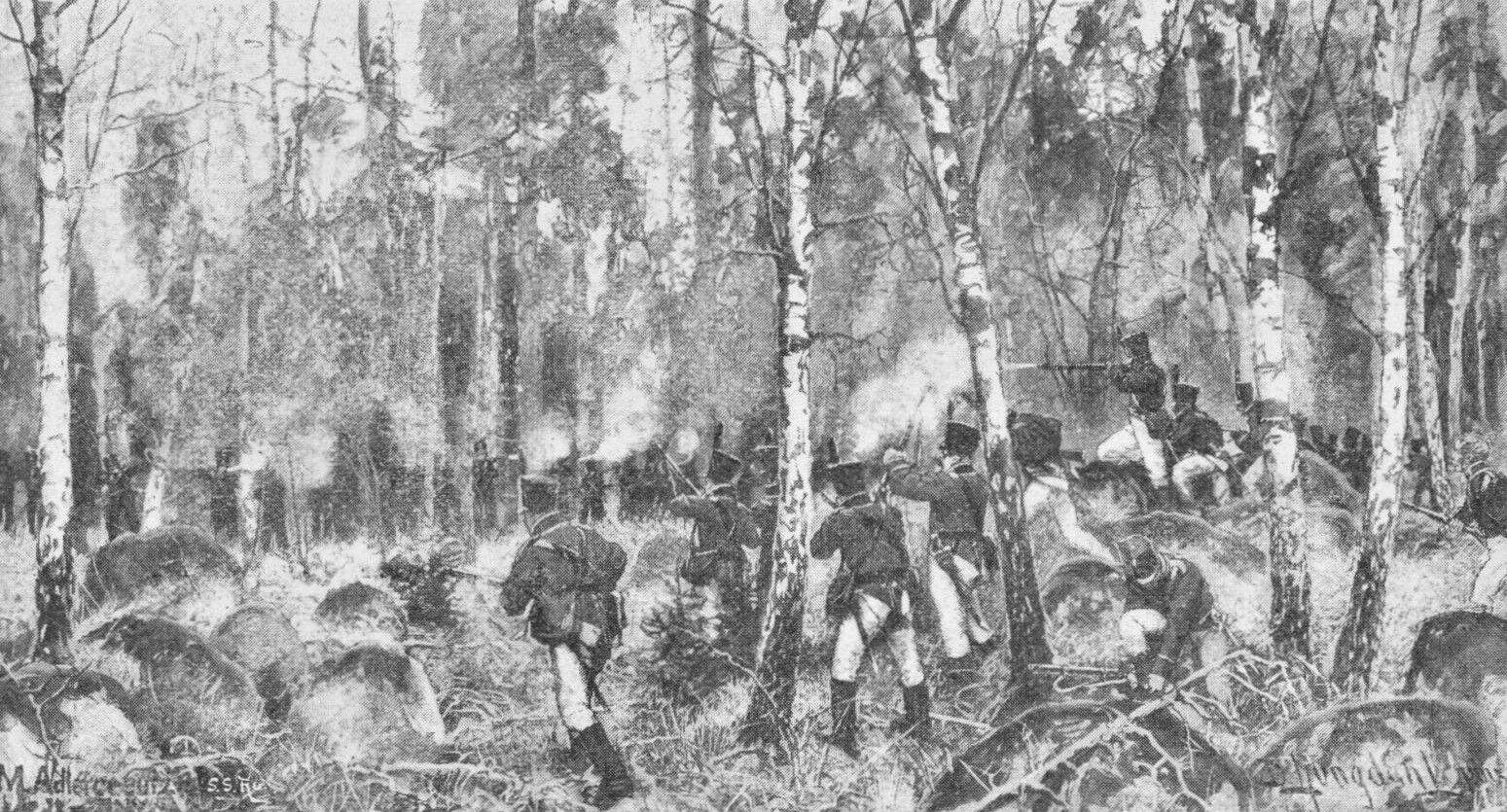
- The advance of the Savolax Brigade; Magnus Adlercreutz, 1898
Date	14 July 1808
Location	Lapua, Swedish Finland
Result	Swedish victory

Belligerents
Sweden	Russian Empire

Commanders and leaders
Carl Johan Adlercreutz	(Russian Empire) Nikolay Nikolayevich Raevsky

Strength
4,700; 18 guns	4,000; 15 or 17 guns

Casualties and losses
25 killed 133 wounded 11 missing (Note: Missing are presumed to be either killed or captured, or soldier who has been dispersed during the battle.)	200 killed, wounded or captured

The Battle of Lapua was fought between Swedish and Russian troops on 14 July 1808 at Lapua, Finland. The battle was a part of the Finnish War of 1808–1809. The Russians had set up defences around Lapua. The Swedes tried to outflank and surround the defending Russians. The Björneborg Regiment under Georg Carl von Döbeln distinguished itself during the battle. In the end the Russians managed to retreat, but the victory was an important one for the Swedish as it allowed them to continue their offensive.

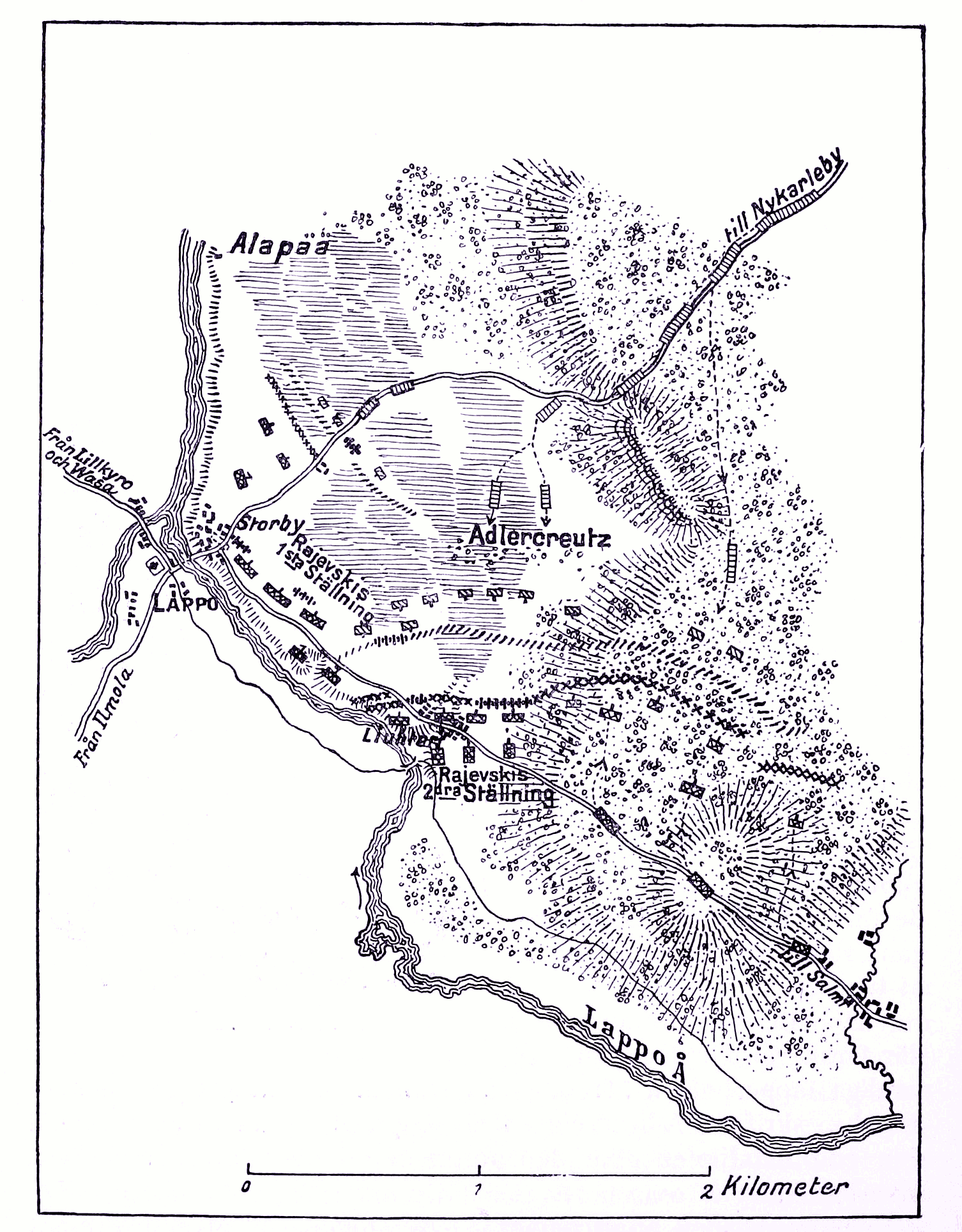
Positions at the battle

== Notes, citations and sources ==
=== Sources ===
- Hornborg, Eirik (1955). När riket sprängdes: fälttågen i Finland och Västerbotten, 1808–1809 (in Swedish). Stockholm: P. A. Norstedts och Söners Förlag.
