= Wilhelm Mauritz Klingspor =

Swedish army officer (1744–1814)

His Excellency The High Well-born Field Marshal Count Wilhelm Mauritz Klingspor
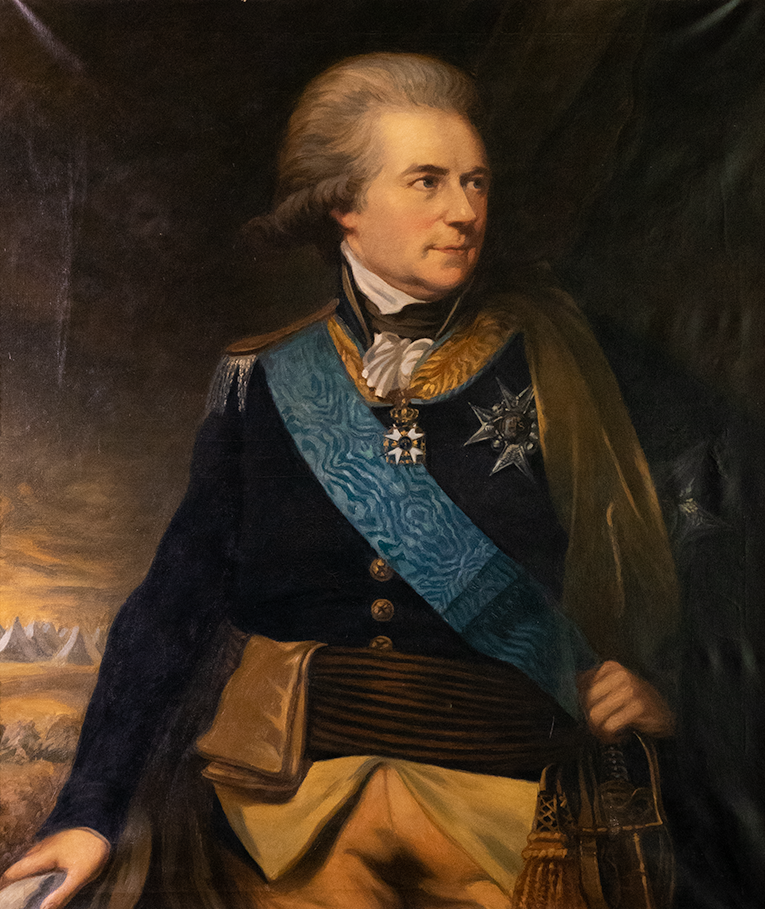
- Portrait by Carl Frederik von Breda, 1799
- Born: 7 December 1744; Karlstorp Parish, Jönköping County, Sweden
- Died: 15 May 1814 (aged 69); Stockholm, Sweden
- Relatives: Christian Frederick Klingspor (father); Anna Magdalena Pauli (mother)
- Military career
- Allegiance: Sweden; France
- Branch: Swedish Army; French Royal Army
- Service years: 1752–1810
- Rank: Field marshal
- Commands: Västerbotten Regiment; Dalarna Regiment; Pori Brigade; Nyland Brigade
- Conflicts: Russo-Swedish War (1788–1790); Finnish War
- Awards: Royal Order of the Seraphim; Commander with the Great Cross of the Order of the Sword; Knight with the Great Cross of the Order of the Sword; Lord of the Realm

Count Wilhelm Mauritz Klingspor (7 December 1744 – 15 May 1814) was a Swedish army officer and one of the Lords of the Realm. He is probably best known from his time as field marshal of Finland during the Finnish War, where his command of the Swedish army contributed to the Swedish loss. He is also known for participating in the coup of 1809 that dethroned Gustav IV of Sweden.

== Biography ==
Wilhelm Mauritz Klingspor was a member of the Swedish branch of the Klingspor noble family. He was the son of Christian Fredrik Klingspor (1711–1785) who was vice president of Svea Court of Appeal and who in 1771 had been made a friherre (baron).

Already as a child, Klingspor was given the rank of corporal in the Västergötland Cavalry Regiment, and as a young man he served in several French regiments during the Seven Years' War (1756–1763). In 1763 he returned to Sweden and made a career in the Swedish Army. In 1779 he was made a colonel and commander of the Västerbotten Regiment. In 1789 he was promoted to major general and in 1790 to lieutenant general.

Klingspor had made impressive efforts in the Quartermaster Corps of the Swedish Army, which resulted in him being appointed Quartermaster-General for the army in Finland during the war of 1788–1790. In this role, he saved the army's supplies at Anjala, which were close to falling into the enemy's hands.

In 1799, Klingspor was made a count and in 1800 was awarded the title Lord of the Realm by Gustav IV. In 1802 he was promoted to general and was made commanding general (general en chef) in Finland. In 1804 he led the elaboration of a defence plan for Finland, requesting an expansion of the enlisted force, improvements to the arsenal and the strengthening of border fortifications — none of which were implemented.

When the Finnish War broke out in 1808, Klingspor turned out to lack suitable experience or temperament to fulfill the role of commanding general in wartime. His instructions were to prioritise saving his army, but also to stop and delay the enemy as far as possible. He interpreted this instruction to mean that he should retreat in haste and having arrived to the headquarters in Hämeenlinna (Tavastehus) 2 March 1808, he ordered the army to retreat. His conduct of the hasty retreat to the north, all the way to Oulu, has been severely criticised.

Carl Johan Adlercreutz victory at the battle of Siikajoki 18 April demonstrated weaknesses in the Russian Army and finally convinced Klingspor (who had been made field marshal) to advance to the south with his army, but did not do so until early June. The command of the army continued to be weak under Klingspor, and following the battle of Ruona–Salmi 1–2 September 1808, the campaign was irretrievably lost. At this stage, Klingspor requested ships to transport the army from Finland to mainland Sweden. He then marched on Vaasa, which opened the possibility for the enemy to take a shortcut to Nykarleby and cut off the Swedish march, in case the army would need to continue to the north. However, Georg Carl von Döbeln's victory in the battle of Jutas 13 September 1808 opened the way. The following day, when the Swedish-Finnish army fought the bloody battle of Oravais under the command of Adlercreutz, Klingspor was as usual some distance ahead of the army.

After Klingspor had concluded the Truce of Lohteå on 29 September 1808, which meant that the army should retreat to Himanka, he was relieved of his command in a harshly worded decision.

Assessments of Klingspor's performance as commander have varied. His greatest military weakness was that he was not a battlefield commander in the true sense: he was unable to see the overall picture, tended to regard minor obstacles as insurmountable, and showed little fighting spirit. Though he possessed professional knowledge comparable to his successor Carl Johan Adlercreutz, he lacked the latter's courage and strength of will. It should be noted, however, that the most decisive event determining the outcome of the war was the capitulation of Sveaborg, for which Klingspor bore no responsibility.

Following the coup of 1809, which Klingspor participated in, he became a member of the new government. Together with Adlercreutz and Georg Adlersparre he received the thanks of the parliament of the estates following the coup. In 1809, he was made Governor of Stockholm, but was removed from this position in 1810 after his passivity failed to prevent the lynching of Axel von Fersen.

In a letter in December 1810 to the Russian empress dowager Maria Feodorovna he asked her to support his claim of damages for his loss of property in the Finnish War to the amount of half a million rubles. It seems that the letter never reached the hands of the empress dowager.
