= Johan Adam Cronstedt =

Swedish Lieutenant General

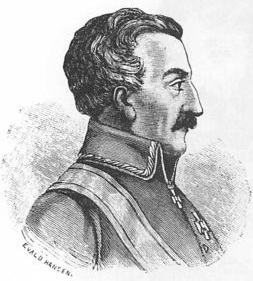
Johan Adam Cronstedt

Count Johan Adam Cronstedt (12 November 1749 – 21 February 1836) was a Swedish Lieutenant General and governor of Östergötland County. He joined up aged 14 and participated in the Russo-Swedish War (1788–90), but he is most notable for his part in the 1808-09 Finnish War and his command of the Savo Brigade.
