= Finnish War =

1808–1809 war between Russia and Sweden

- Part of the Napoleonic Wars and the Russo-Swedish wars
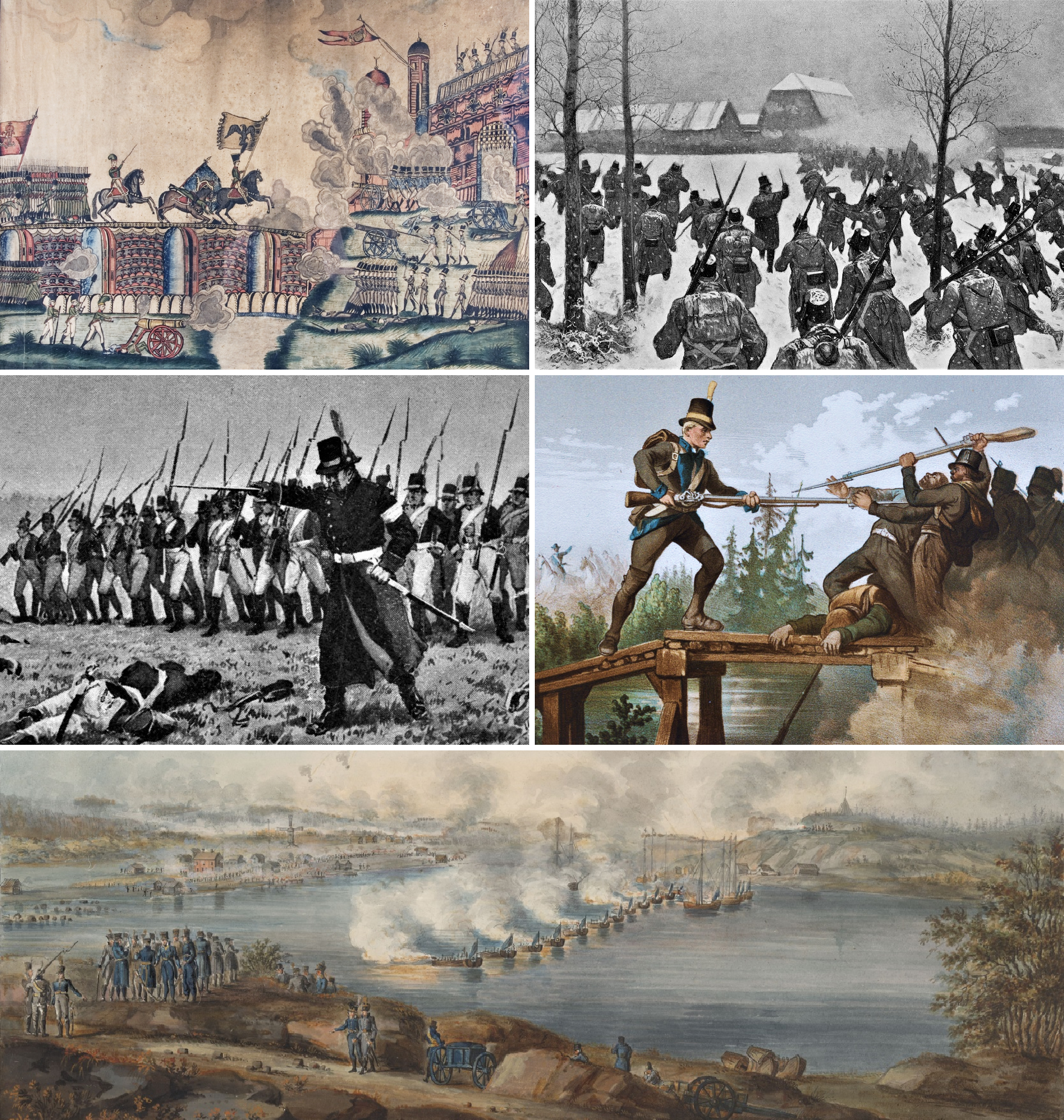
- Left to right from the top: Siege of Sveaborg; Battle of Revolax; Battle of Oravais; Sven Dufva (epic poem) at the Battle of Koljonvirta; Battles of Sävar and Ratan
Date	21 February 1808 – 17 September 1809 (1 year, 6 months, 3 weeks and 6 days)
Location	Finland and Sweden
Result	Russian victory
Territorial changes	Treaty of Fredrikshamn (Sweden loses Finland, Åland, a part of Lapland and a part of West Bothnia, from which the Grand Duchy of Finland was constituted, an autonomous part of the Russian Empire.)

Belligerents
Russia; France; Denmark–Norway	Sweden; United Kingdom

Commanders and leaders
Alexander I; Friedrich Wilhelm von Buxhoeveden; Bogdan von Knorring; Aleksey Arakcheyev; Michael Andreas Barclay de Tolly; Nikolay Kamensky; Yakov Kulnev; Pyotr Bagration; Nikolay Raevsky	Gustav IV Adolf; Charles XIII; Wilhelm Klingspor; Carl Adlercreutz; Johan Sandels; Georg von Döbeln; Carl Olof Cronstedt (POW); Eberhard von Vegesack

Strength
August 1808: 55,000	August 1808: 36,000

Casualties and losses
10,000 killed or wounded	7,000 killed or wounded 53,000 died of disease and other hardships

The Finnish War (Note: Swedish: Finska kriget; Russian: Финляндская война; Finnish: Suomen sota.) was fought between the Kingdom of Sweden and the Russian Empire from 21 February 1808 to 17 September 1809 as part of the Napoleonic Wars. As a result of the war, the eastern third of Sweden was established as the autonomous Grand Duchy of Finland within the Russian Empire. Other notable effects were the Swedish parliament's adoption of a new constitution and the establishment of the House of Bernadotte, the new Swedish royal house, in 1818.

== Background ==
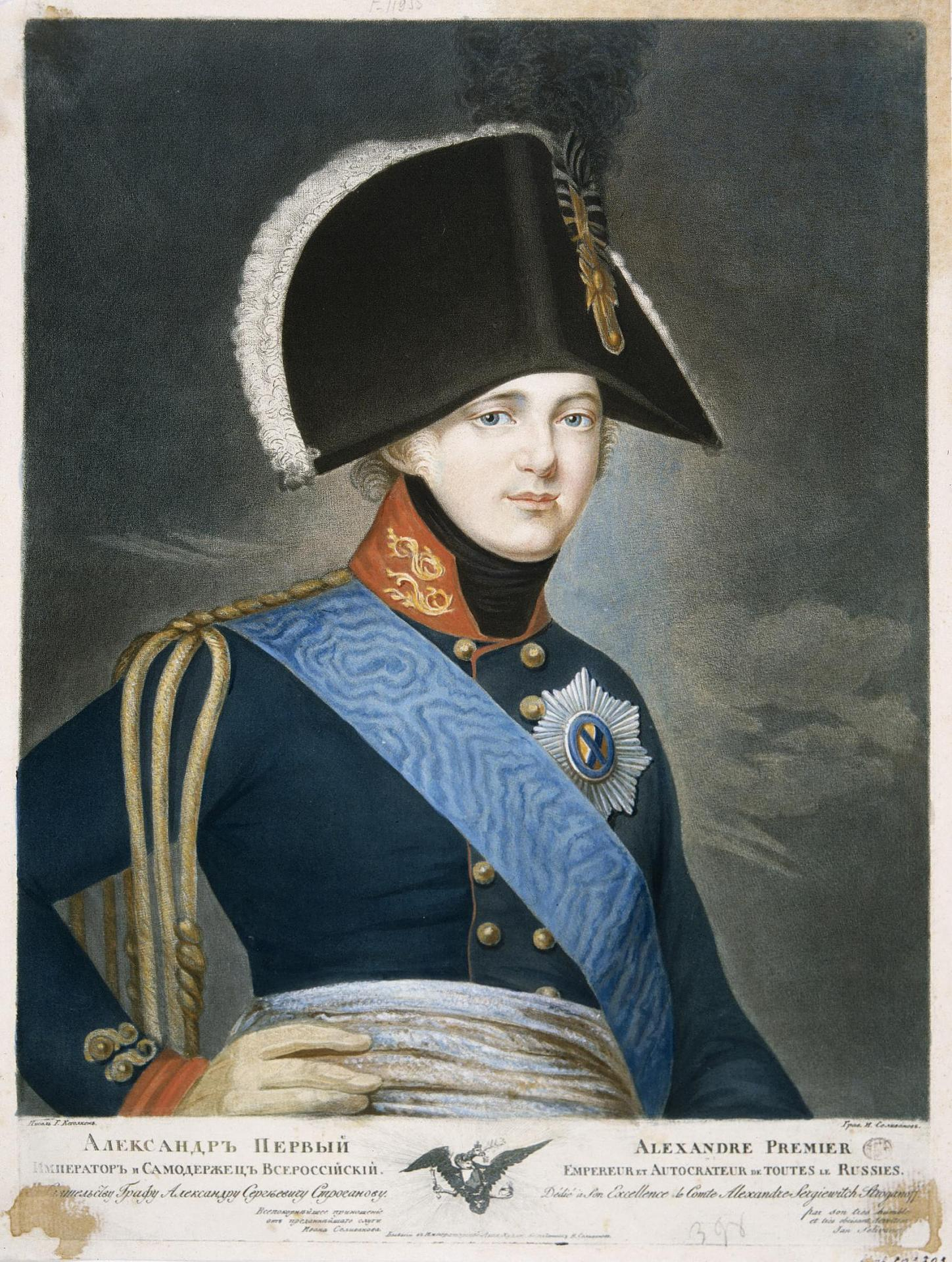
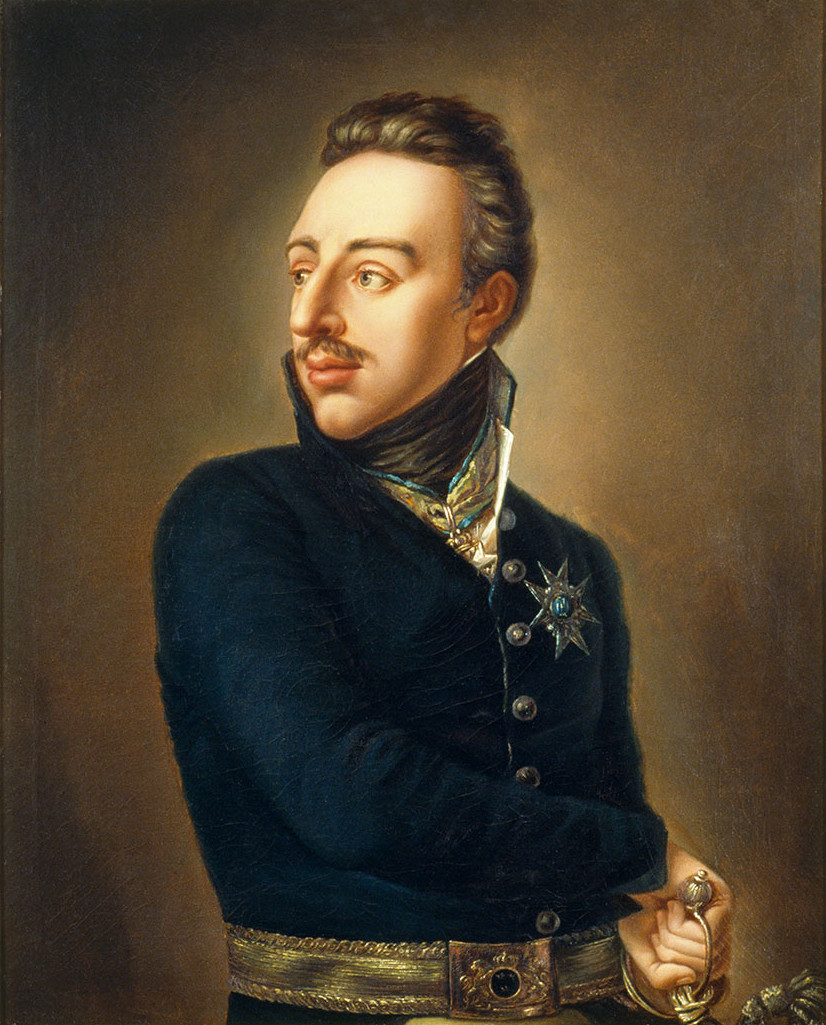
Alexander I, Emperor of Russia and Gustav IV Adolf, King of Sweden

After the Russian Emperor Alexander I concluded the 1807 Treaty of Tilsit with Napoleon, Alexander, in his letter on 24 September 1807 to the Swedish King Gustav IV Adolf, informed the king that the peaceful relations between Russia and Sweden depended on Swedish agreement to abide by the limitations of the Treaty of Tilsit which in practice meant that Sweden would have been required to cut off trade with Britain in accordance with the Continental System. The king, who viewed Napoleon as the Antichrist and Britain as his ally against Napoleon's France, was apprehensive of the system's ruinous consequences for Sweden's maritime commerce. He instead entered into negotiations with Britain in order to prepare a joint attack against Denmark, whose Norwegian possessions he coveted.

In the meantime, the Royal Navy attacked Copenhagen and the Anglo-Russian War (1807–1812) was declared. Referring to the treaties of 1780 and 1800, the emperor demanded that Gustav Adolf close the Baltic Sea to all foreign warships. Although he reiterated his demand on November 16, 1807, it took two months before the king responded that it was impossible to honor the previous arrangements as long as the French were in control of the major Baltic ports. King Gustav Adolf did this after securing an alliance with Britain on 8 February 1808. Meanwhile, on 30 December 1807 Russia announced it would be forced to act should Sweden not give a clear reply.

Although most Swedish officers were sceptical about their chances in fighting the larger and more experienced Imperial Russian Army, Gustav Adolf had an unrealistic view of Sweden's ability to defend itself against Russia. In Saint Petersburg, his stubbornness was viewed as a convenient pretext for Russia to occupy Finland, thus pushing the Russo-Swedish frontier considerably to the west of the Russian capital and safeguarding it in case of any future hostilities between the two powers.

The situation was problematic for Sweden, since it once again faced both Denmark and Russia as potential enemies requiring the Swedes to split their forces. The king had thought it impossible to defend Finland should the enemy attack during the winter and chose largely to ignore the repeated warnings of the Russian threat he received in early 1808. Most of the Swedish plans assumed that warfare would be impossible during winter, disregarding the lessons from recent wars. In addition, several new good roads had been built into Finland greatly reducing the earlier dependency on naval support for any large operation in Finland.

The Swedish plan was to first passively defend and hold on to the fortifications in the southern coast of Finland, in which Sweden had strong garrisons, while the rest of the Swedish Army retreated to the north. Then in the spring, counterattack simultaneously from north and south, when the Swedish army would have naval support and the Russian army would be spread over Finland and thus have long supply lines. The basic reason for the plan was to avoid major decisive battles.

Some advocates existed for taking a more active approach immediately, namely Lieutenant Colonel Samuel Möller who advocated for taking an immediate offensive and Gustaf Mauritz Armfelt who supported actively delaying the advancing enemies in co-operation with the garrisons on the southern coast.

In the end, instructions which the new Swedish commander in Finland, General Wilhelm Mauritz Klingspor, received from the king were an unsuccessful and open-ended mixture of ideas from these very different plans.

Russia had gathered a wealth of information from Finland using spies and other sources. The level of detail was so great that Russian maps of Finland were in many respects more accurate than their Swedish counterparts. The Russians used the services of General Georg Magnus Sprengtporten when forming their plans. Sprengtporten suggested going on to an offensive during the winter since Finland would be mostly isolated when seas were frozen. His ideas were further developed by General Jan Pieter van Suchtelen before General Friedrich Wilhelm von Buxhoeveden was appointed as the commander of the Russian army in Finland in December 1807.

The plan involved using the series of fortifications built after 1790 as staging grounds for the Russian advances into Finland. In southern Finland, armies were to isolate the fortifications and first take control of the whole of southern Finland before advancing further to the north. Forces in Savonia were to press hard against the Swedes and reach the Gulf of Bothnia towards Oulu and Vaasa to cut off the retreat of the main body of the Swedish army.

== War ==
=== February–May 1808 ===
Finnish War, February 1808 at the outbreak of the war

On February 21, 1808, 24,000 Russian troops under Friedrich Wilhelm von Buxhoevden crossed the Swedish–Russian border in Ahvenkoski and took the town of Loviisa. Since Klingspor had not arrived, Lieutenant General Karl Nathanael af Klercker acted as Swedish commander in Finland. He was notified of the Russian invasion already on 21 February and since it was impossible to hold the predefined defense lines as the army had not yet fully assembled, he ordered the army to assemble at Hämeenlinna. Before the engagement started, Klingspor finally arrived on 2 March and assumed command. Instead of facing the Russians at Hämeenlinna, he ordered the army to withdraw. In Savonia the Russians also forced the Swedes to withdraw. The king was quite unprepared for the attack, especially as war was not declared until April. About 21,000 Swedish troops were stationed in various fortresses in Finland, while the rest of his army was unable to leave southern Sweden for fear of Danish attack.

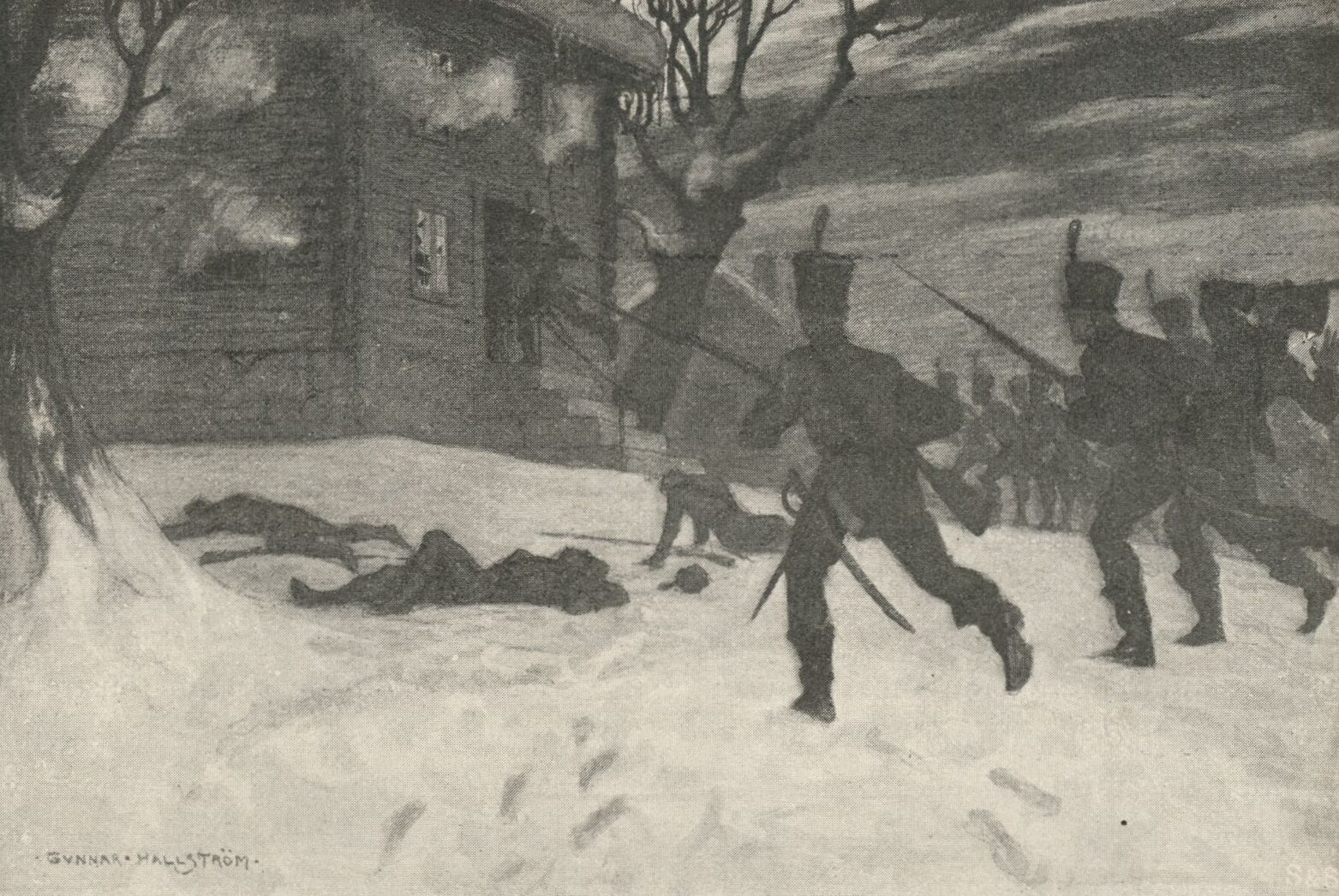
The Swedish assault on the chancellery in Kuopio during the Battle of Kuopio

The Russian advance was swift. On the first day of the war they had captured the town of Loviisa and besieged the Swedish sea fortress of Svartholm. Porvoo was captured on 24 February and Helsinki on 2 March. Abandoned Swedish fortifications on the Hanko Peninsula were taken and manned on 21 March and on the same day the Russian army took Turku while a small detachment was sent to Åland. Before the end of March 1808 even Vaasa was taken. In Savonia, Russians also advanced rapidly and took Kuopio on 16 March. Swedish forces had mostly just withdrawn before the advancing Russian often destroying usable materials. For example, the Swedish archipelago fleet's ships that had been docked in Turku (nearly 50 gun sloops) were torched to prevent their capture.

The Swedish fortress of Svartholm, commanded by Major Carl Magnus Gripenberg, was ill-prepared for a war. While the garrison was 700 men strong, only a third of the men had actually functioning weapons, while most of the fortress' guns had no carriages. The fortress had fallen into disrepair and lacked both adequate food and ammunition stores. Even the wells were found to be unusable. After starting the siege on 21 February, the Russians issued a surrender demand for the fort, but this was refused by the Swedes. The demand was repeated on 2 March but without success. After a meager Russian bombardment, Gripenberg agreed to negotiations on 10 March. The fortress surrendered to the Russians on 18 March after a siege that had lasted roughly a month, with just one man having been wounded in action.

Finnish War, March–May 1808

Sveaborg (Finnish: Suomenlinna) under Admiral Carl Olof Cronstedt had been well prepared for the war with a garrison of 6,000 men, over 700 cannons, and enough stores to last until the summer of 1808. Defenses were strong enough to prevent the Russians from trying to storm the fortress by surprise. Instead the Russians laid siege to Sveaborg. The fortress surrendered on 6 May 1808 after prolonged negotiations with the Russians as the commanding officer Carl Olof Cronstedt and his council believed that resistance was futile. The Russians gained the main body of the Swedish archipelago fleet intact as well as large stores of supplies and munitions.

The Russians had advanced considerably but they had also gained the long and vulnerable coastline with it. After the sea would be clear of ice there would be nothing to prevent Swedish forces from landing troops on the shore. With the Royal Navy supporting the Swedish Navy there was little the Russian Baltic Fleet could accomplish. Capture of the main body of the Swedish archipelago fleet had resulted in a real advantage to the Russians since it allowed them to gain superiority in the narrow waters of the Finnish archipelago where large ships of the line could not operate. Even the powerful explosion at Sveaborg which destroyed several of the captured ships did little to change Russian superiority in the Finnish archipelago. The Russians utilized the guns from the burned ships, and from those which burned during the winter, and constructed several fortifications on the coast, both in Hanko as well as along narrow passages leading to Turku.

Under Colonel Carl Johan Adlercreutz the Swedish army counter-attacked at Siikajoki and began to halt the Russian offensive. Soon after at the Battle of Revolax (Finnish: Revonlahti), the Swedish army under Colonel Johan Adam Cronstedt started an advance towards the south. These successes yielded a promotion to Field Marshal for Wilhelm Mauritz Klingspor. The Swedish advance was very slow however, as operations were often halted due to the thaw. An exception was the brigade under Colonel Johan August Sandels, which swiftly advanced towards Kuopio. Nikolay Tuchkov, a Russian general who was dispatched to the north of Finland, left garrisons in every fort along his way. This reduced his unit to 4,000 troops, which proved insufficient to pacify the hostile country. The Finns rose up in guerrilla fighting as far east as Frederikshamn (Finnish: Hamina) within the Old Finland province of Russia.

In May, the Russians suffered further setbacks when they were driven from Gotland and Åland, where a Swedish flotilla, supported by the local population, compelled the small Russian force left on the main island of Fasta Åland to surrender, and then invaded the island of Kumlinge where the bulk of the Russian garrison on the Åland Islands was based. After a two-hour-long battle, the local militia, together with the Swedish landing force, overwhelmed their enemies and Colonel Vuich and his garrison were compelled to surrender.

On May 26, a British fleet carrying 14,000 troops under Sir John Moore entered the port of Gothenburg. Due to various disagreements with the Swedish king, however, they never landed and sailed off to fight the French in Spain after leaving 16 battleships and 20 other ships at Sweden's disposal.

=== June–July 1808 ===
The Swedish battlefleet which had been expelling Russians from Gotland was ordered to blockade the Hanko Peninsula and reached the cape on 10 June. Due to bad weather and poor visibility the fleet under Admiral Rudolf Cederström chose to stay relatively far from the coast. Upon approaching the coast on 21 June, Cederström learned that the Russians had already passed the cape some time earlier. Attempts to stop the Russians deeper in the archipelago were also unsuccessful. Failure to block the Russians led the king to relieve Cederström of his duties and replace him with Commander Henrik Johan Nauckhoff.

Major General Eberhard von Vegesack was chosen to lead the first Swedish army to Finland. He was to lead a force of 2,600 men, land somewhere between Uusikaupunki and Turku, and then capture the latter. Von Vegesack instead chose to land his force at the Lemu manor house a few kilometers south of Turku. The landing began on 19 June and was initially successful. The surprised Russians garrisoned at Turku reacted quickly, however, and deployed over 3,000 men to stop the landing force. By the morning of 20 June, the Swedish forces were forced to withdraw. In addition, Colonel Johan Bergenstråhle landed 1,100 Swedes just a few kilometers northeast of Vaasa on 25 June and managed to quickly advance to the town. The Russians, however, managed to gather a force of 3,000 men which was able to force the ill-trained Swedes to withdraw.

The advance of the Russian coastal squadron beyond Hanko created difficulties for the Swedes. The strength of the Swedish coastal forces deployed to the Finnish archipelago was equal in size to the coastal fleet that the Russians had obtained by the Sveaborg surrender. To prevent the Russians from gaining strength, the Swedish coastal fleet's unit under Rear Admiral Claes Hjelmstjerna tried to engage them twice in battle. The first was at the Battle of Rimito Kramp on 30 June, and after Russians withdrew closer to Turku, the second was a battle at Pukkisaari on 4 July. Fighting ended in a stalemate, but can be viewed as a Swedish failure since they failed to decisively defeat the Russians.

Finnish War, May–October 1808

Having been alerted to the approach of additional Russian coastal units from Sveaborg, the Swedish forces moved to intercept them before they could link up with the Russian coastal unit now bottled up at Turku. Learning that the Russians intended to go around the island of Kimito (Finnish: Kemiönsaari), a Swedish force of gunboats was deployed to the narrows. They met the Russians first at Tallholmen on 21 July and again on 2 August in the Battle of Sandöström. Swedish attempts to land troops and artillery in support of the gunboats at Vestankärr on 2 August ended in failure, though the attempt came very close to capturing General Friedrich Wilhelm von Buxhoeveden. While none of the fights ended with a decisive winner, the overall strategic victory went to Russia, who gained advantage in the Finnish archipelago by managing to link up their separate coastal units.

Sweden performed several small landings along the coast near Kristinestad and Kaskinen and managed to raise local men to oppose the Russians. The first occurred on 3 July with several others taking place soon after. Altogether the Swedes had several hundred local men-in-arms. The Russians, however, were able to send reinforcements to the area which were, in addition to being numerically superior, both far better trained and equipped than the peasants and militia the Swedes had raised. By the end of July the small forces Sweden had landed and the men that had supported them were either beaten or withdrawn back to their ships.

=== August–September 1808 ===
After the Russians were driven from Central Finland, their forces stretched along the line of Pori–Tampere–Mikkeli. Having received considerable reinforcements, their numbers increased to 55,000, as opposed to the 36,000 estimated for Sweden. On 14 August, Count Nikolay Kamensky decided to use this numerical superiority to launch a new offensive.

Kamensky's 11,000-strong corps achieved important victories at Kuortane (1 September) and Salmi (2 September), and although Georg Carl von Döbeln won the Battle of Jutas for Sweden on 13 September, Kamensky gained the most important victory at Oravais on 14 September. Swedish attempts to land more troops near Turku were stalled by Lieutenant-General Pyotr Bagration's prompt actions. In Eastern Finland, the guerrilla movement was gradually extinguished. As a consequence, Russia's situation in Southern Finland improved significantly.

In the north, the situation was more complicated. Tuchkov's battered unit strained to hold its own against Sandels, while the progress of a relief force under General Alekseyev was contained by guerrilla fighters. It was not until 26 September that Prince Dolgorukov (Alekseyev's replacement) managed to join his forces with Tuchkov's, inducing Sandels to retreat. Three days later, Buxhoeveden—pressed by the early onset of winter weather—signed an armistice, much to the dismay of Alexander I. The emperor refused to ratify the truce and replaced Buxhoeveden with a new commander-in-chief, Bogdan von Knorring, in December of that year.

In the south, the Swedish battle fleet remained anchored within the Finnish archipelago, blocking some of the deeper coastal sea routes from Hanko towards Turku. Russian ships continued to arrive from the east but remained within the shallow narrows where the Swedish ships of the line could not reach. Small boat actions took place during the night time of 17–18 July which became known as the skirmish at Lövö (Finnish: Lövön kahakka). However, the Swedish fleet dropped its blockade on 22 August, allowing the Russian coastal units to unite. Odds were very much against the Swedes as the Russians had nearly one hundred coastal ships in the Finnish archipelago, against which Sweden could deploy only 7 galleys and 30 gun sloops.

Swedish efforts to harass the Russians with landings continued, with roughly 1,000 volunteers under Captain Anders Gyllenbögel landing on 1 August to support Swedish-led uprisings on the coast south of Vaasa. The landing succeeded, and together with Swedish troops advancing from the north, they managed to drive the Russians towards Pori. Swedish patrol ships (consisting of armed merchant vessels) scouted and raided the coast, taking Russians prisoners to Åland. These raids caused much confusion, and Russian responses to them thinned their strength along the coast. Also the Swedish southern army of Finland, consisting of roughly 4,000 men under Major General Eberhard von Vegesack, was moved from Åland to Finland, and landed at Kristinestad in late autumn, joining with von Döbeln's forces. However, since von Vegesack had been ordered to land his men at Pori, the king, after pursuing the matter unsuccessfully in military tribunals, condemned von Vegesack to lose his rank and title.

A Russian battle fleet under Admiral Pyotr Khanykov (also Chanikoff) sortied in late July to clear the Swedish blockades in the archipelago, to cut contact between Åland and Sweden, and to stop Swedish supply transports sailing in the Gulf of Bothnia. The Russian fleet reached Hanko on 6 August and chose not to engage the scattered Swedish fleet elements in the vicinity. On 20 August, two British ships of the line (HMS Implacable and Centaur) joined the Swedish fleet. The allied fleet moved on 25 August 1808 to engage the Russian fleet, which turned and attempted to reach the relative safety of Baltiyskiy Port. The British ships were far superior sailing ships compared to those of either the Swedes or Russians, and engaged the withdrawing Russian squadron (nine ships of the line and several frigates) on their own. The last of the Russian ships of the line was disabled and then captured and burned by the British ships. More Royal Navy ships (including HMS Victory, Mars, Goliath, and Africa) arrived to oversee a blockade of the Russian fleet at Baltiyskiy Port which continued until the sea started to freeze. The Swedish fleet suffered from outbreaks of scurvy and had been unable to maintain the blockade on its own.

Skirmishes and landings continued in the Finnish archipelago from late summer into autumn. On 30 August, the Swedish coastal fleet defeated its Russian adversaries at the Battle of Grönvikssund, forcing the Russians to abandon their plans to invade Åland and concentrate on defense. On 17 September, the Swedes landed again, this time at Lokalahti, while the coastal fleet covering the landing managed to keep the Russians away in the Battle of Palva Sund on 18 September. The troops that landed were forced to withdraw to their ships on 18 September, but landed in Finland again on 26 September. However, owing to bad weather, only a portion of the troops that had been intended to participate in the landing actually reached the Finnish coast, and this resulted in another withdrawal on 28 September.

The Swedish situation was further weakened by being at war with France and Denmark, both of whom threatened Sweden's possessions, with a joint invasion force of 45,000 troops in Denmark (under French Marshal Jean-Baptiste Bernadotte) and a further 36,000 in Norway. This forced the Swedes to allocate forces to southern Sweden and along the Norwegian border (23,000 troops). Denmark had declared war on Sweden on 14 March and some battles and skirmishes were fought along the Norwegian border. In April Napoleon began to devote more attention to the situation in Spain, and the British navy remained a continuous threat for troop movements between Denmark and Sweden.

=== Winter 1808 ===
Finnish War, Winter 1808 - Summer 1809

By November 1808, Russian forces had overrun all of Finland. On 19 November, the Convention of Olkijoki was signed and the Swedish army was forced to leave the Finnish countryside. The Russian emperor was, however, now eager to bring hostilities to the territory of Sweden proper, which was certain to bring the war to a victorious end.

With this objective in mind, Kamensky suggested a daring plan, whereby the Russian army was to cross the frozen Gulf of Bothnia at two locations: one unit was to march from Vaasa towards Umeå and the other from Turku to Åland and thence towards the vicinity of Stockholm. A third unit was to advance into Sweden by land, going around the gulf and through the town of Tornio.

Although Knorring was urged to execute the plan as quickly as possible, he regarded the idea as unrealistic and procrastinated until March, when the emperor dispatched the War Minister Arakcheyev to Finland in order to pressure Knorring into action before joining the army himself.

=== Spring 1809 ===
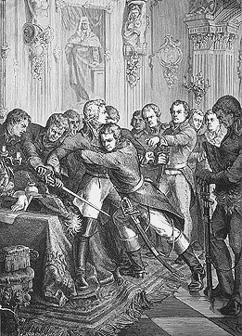
Arrest of Gustav IV.

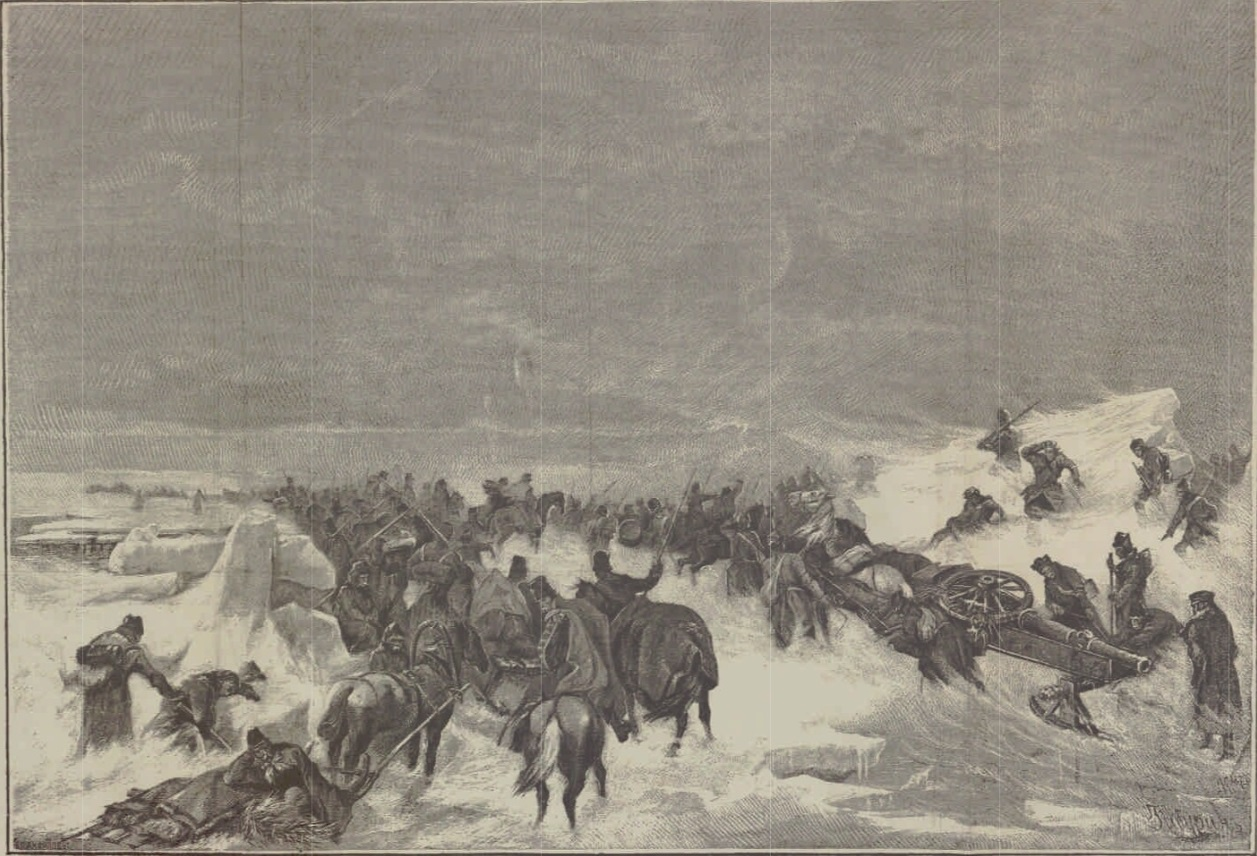
Russian troops crossing Kvarken in March 1809 (Alexander Kotzebue)

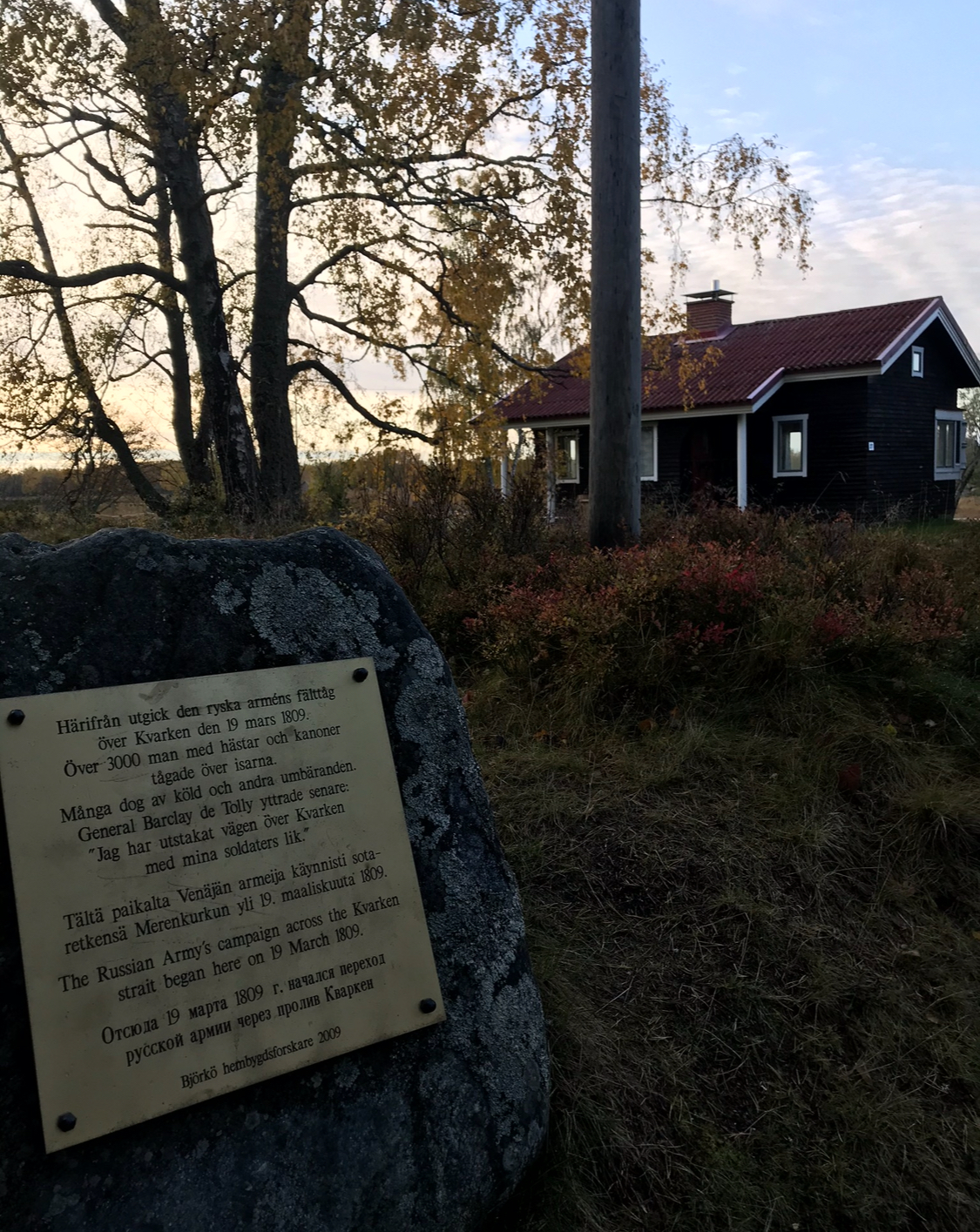
Memorial plaque commemorating the Russian army's crossing of Kvarken in 1809 in Björköby, Finland.

As Russian forces embarked upon their unprecedented march across the frozen gulf, King Gustav IV, accused of fatal mistakes leading to the loss of Finland—was dethroned by a coup in Stockholm on 13 March, and his uncle was proclaimed Charles XIII of Sweden. Four days later, Bagration's corps of 17,000 men occupied the strategic Åland Islands, while Kulnev led a vanguard further across the frozen sea that on 19 March reached the Swedish shore within 70 km from Stockholm.

When news of Kulnev's incursion spread to the Swedish capital, the new king sent an embassy to Knorring, proposing a truce. The Russian commander agreed and speedily recalled Kulnev back to Åland. Meanwhile, the other Russian contingent—5,000 men under Barclay de Tolly—endured great hardship in crossing the frozen gulf further north; they entered Umeå on 24 March.

The third force, commanded by Count Shuvalov, struck against Tornio and, braving fierce frost, encircled a Swedish army, which capitulated on 25 March. Six days later, the tsar arrived in Turku and, on learning about the truce, not only revoked Knorring's signature but named Barclay de Tolly as the new commander-in-chief. Hostilities thus continued until May, when Shuvalov finally reached Umeå, where he was succeeded by Kamensky.

=== Summer 1809 and conclusion ===
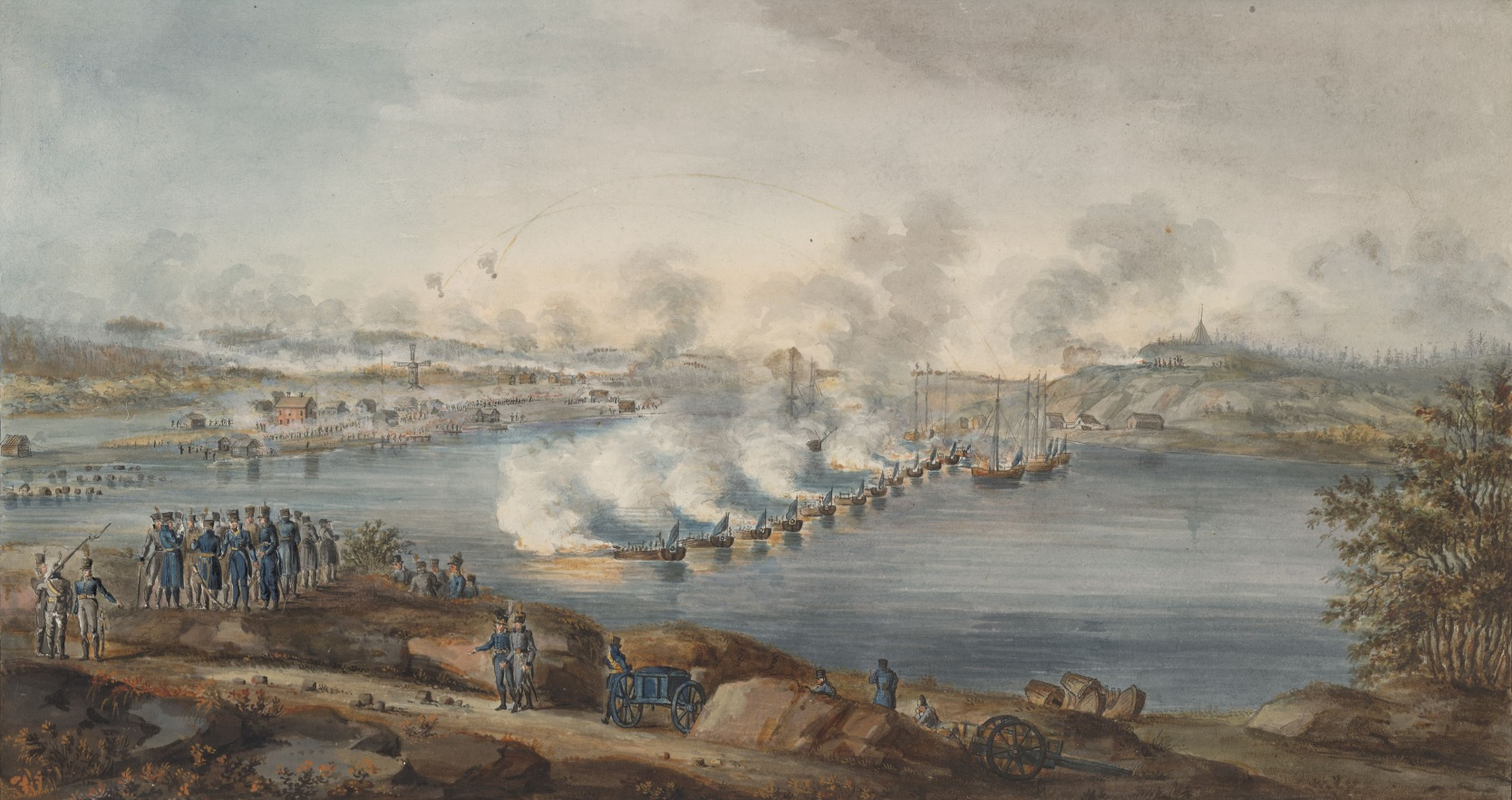
Second to last battle of the war at Ratan near Umeå in Swedish Västerbotten

A British Royal Navy fleet under Admiral James Saumarez had arrived in Sweden in May and he concentrated his ships, 10 ship of the line and 17 smaller ships, to the Gulf of Finland. The presence of the British naval units kept the Russian battlefleet strictly confined to Kronstadt, and after the British constructed artillery batteries to the Porkkala cape they cut off the coastal sea route from Russian ships. Total British control of the Gulf of Finland was a large obstacle to the Russian supply network and required sizable garrisons to be posted all along the Finnish coast. The Royal Navy captured 35 Russian ships and burnt 20 others before leaving the Baltic Sea on 28 September 1809.

In August, Charles XIII, anxious to improve his position at a peace settlement, ordered General Gustav Wachtmeister to land in the north of Sweden and to attack Kamensky's rear. Engagements at Sävar and Ratan proved inconclusive and Kamensky succeeded in neutralizing this belated counter-offensive, following up with a final victory over the Swedes at Piteå.

Finnish War, aftermath

Wachtmeister's action was only a prelude to the peace negotiations that opened in August and resulted in the Treaty of Fredrikshamn (17 September), in which Sweden ceded the whole of Finland and all of its domains east of the Torne river (the north-eastern parts of what was then called Västerbotten, today Norrbotten) to Russia. Sweden then joined the Continental System and closed its harbours to British ships, leading to a formal declaration of war on Great Britain. A few months later, on 6 January 1810, the Russian government mediated the Treaty of Paris between Sweden and France.

Russia would create the Grand Duchy of Finland from the territory obtained from Sweden, and would attach the areas gained from Sweden in the 18th century (so-called Old Finland) to the new Grand Duchy in 1812. The Grand Duchy of Finland was to retain the Gustavian constitution of 1772 with only slight modifications until 1919. Almost all Finnish soldiers in Sweden (most of them in the Umeå area) were repatriated after the war.

== Analysis ==
Sufficient stocks of supplies had not been prepared for the Swedish army, since King Gustaf IV Adolf thought it might be taken as provocative by the Russians. Furthermore, Swedish strategy relied on the outdated plans for Finland which took into account neither the advances in weaponry, mobility of the armed forces or the greatly improved road networks of Finland. Most of the fortifications in Finland had not been completed and those that were completed had mostly fallen into neglect and disrepair. Even the strongest of the Swedish fortresses, Sveaborg, still had several of its planned fortifications missing, most notably all the land side fortifications designed to protect against a besieging enemy.

In 1808 a British expeditionary force under John Moore arrived in Sweden, but after months of idleness departed for the beginning of the Peninsular War. Had the king accepted the landing of 10,000 British troops in Scania, where the expeditionary force had been authorized to disembark, it would have enabled the Swedes to release at least 10,000 trained soldiers for the Finnish War. As it happened, the bulk of the Swedish army, including the best units, were kept out of the Finnish War by the king, who reserved them for his plans for conquering either Sjælland or Norway. Swedish landings were invariably made with poorly equipped and trained forces, often with troops who had very low morale. Landings were further complicated by the Swedish Navy's failure to tightly block the coastal sea route past Hanko.

== Commemoration ==
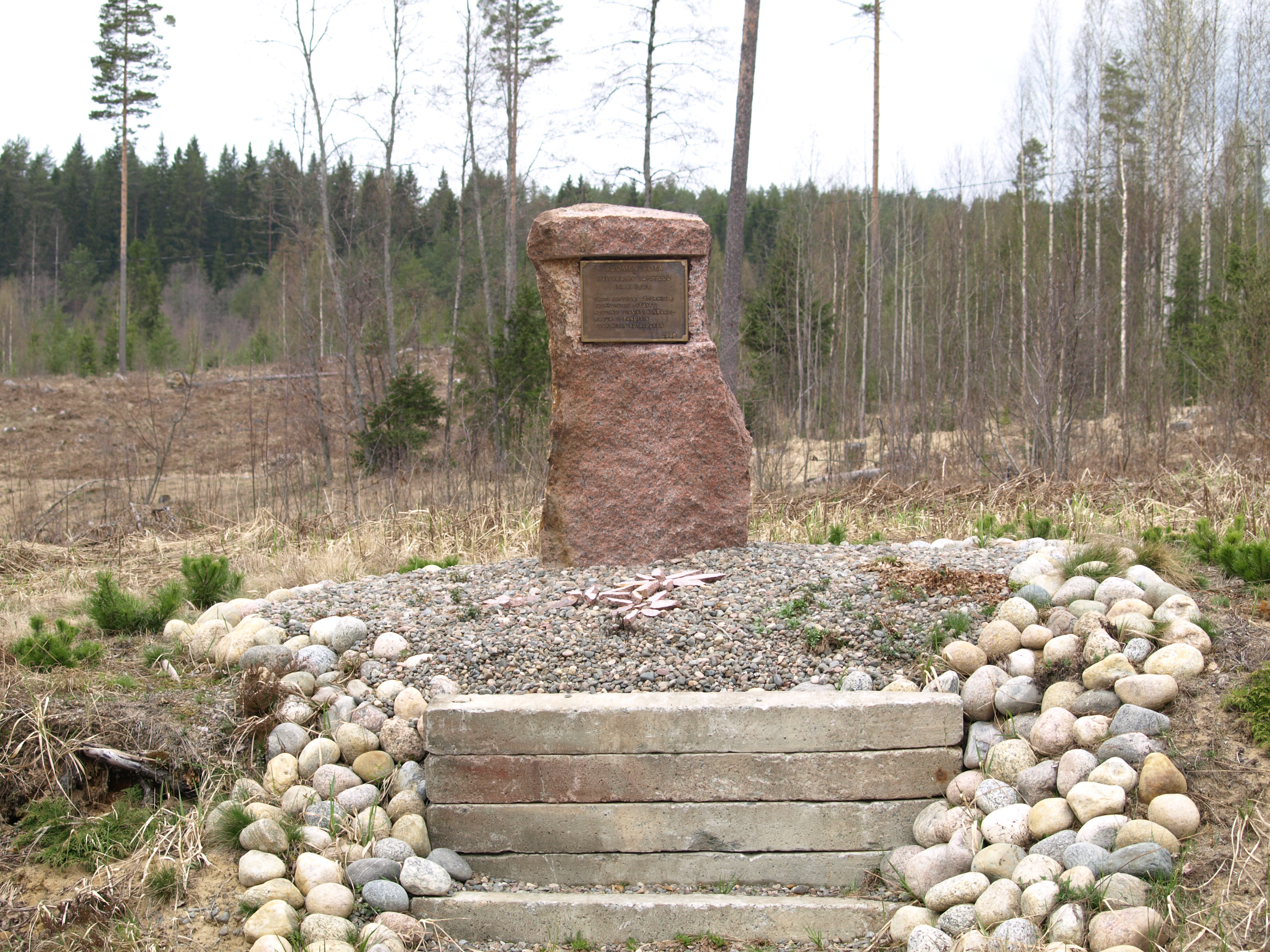
A memorial of the Battle of Kutujoki in Suonenjoki, Finland

The 200th anniversary of the war was selected as the main motif for a high value commemorative coin, the €100 200th Anniversary of Finnish War commemorative coin, minted by Finland in 2008. The motif on the coin is the passage of Finland from Sweden to Russia. The same coin depicts both the pre-war Finnish history, with the withdrawing Swedish crown on the reverse side, and the post-war future of the country, with the Russian eagle symbol on the obverse side.

In memory of the 200th anniversary of the Finnish War, all Swedish 1 krona coins minted during 2009 featured a stylised depiction of the sky and the sea on the reverse side, flanked by a quote by Anton Rosell: Den underbara sagan om ett land på andra sidan havet ("The wonderful story of a land on the other side of the sea").

== Legacy ==
According to two 2015 studies by political scientists Jan Teorell and Bo Rothstein, Sweden's loss in the Finnish War led to reforms of the Swedish bureaucracy. Prior to 1809, Sweden had a reputation as one of Europe's most corrupt countries, but the loss in the war created the perception of an existential threat in the east for Sweden and motivated Swedish elites to reform its bureaucracy. The motivation behind the reforms were to make the Swedish state more effective and functional, and thus protect against the existential threat in the East.

== See also ==
- Dano-Swedish War of 1808–1809
- Åland War
- Diet of Porvoo
- Sven Tuuva the Hero
- The Tales of Ensign Stål

== Bibliography ==
- Nordling, Carl (2004). "Capturing 'The Gibraltar of the North:' How Swedish Sveaborg was taken by the Russians in 1808". Journal of Slavic Military Studies. 17 (4): 715–725. doi:10.1080/13518040490520008.
- Mattila, Tapani (1983). Meri maamme turvana [Sea safeguarding our country] (in Finnish). Jyväskylä: K. J. Gummerus Osakeyhtiö. ISBN 978-951-99487-0-6.
- Götz, Norbert (2015). "The Good Plumpuddings' Belief: British Voluntary Aid to Sweden During the Napoleonic Wars". International History Review. 37 (3): 519–539. doi:10.1080/07075332.2014.918559.
- Hornborg, Eirik (1955). När riket sprängdes: fälttågen i Finland och Västerbotten, 1808–1809 (in Swedish). Stockholm: P. A. Norstedts och Söners Förlag.
- Sandström, Allan (August 2008). Det stora nederlaget: när Sverige och Finland delades 1808–1809 [reissue of Sveriges sista krig] (in Swedish). Stockholm: Gullers förlag. ISBN 978-9188238917.
