= Johann Christoph Brotze =

Baltic German artist and scholar

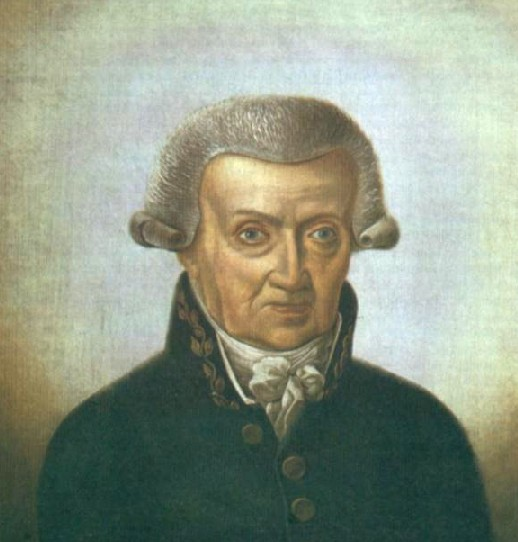
- Portrait of Johann Christoph Brotze
- Born: 1 September 1742; Görlitz, Electorate of Saxony, Holy Roman Empire
- Died: August 4, 1823 (aged 80); Riga, Governorate of Livonia, Russian Empire
- Education: Leipzig University, Martin Luther University Halle-Wittenberg

Johann Christoph Brotze (Latvian: Johans Kristofs Broce; 1 September 1742 – 4 August 1823) was a Renaissance humanism era German pedagogue, artist and ethnographer.

== Biography ==
Brotze was born in Görlitz, Electorate of Saxony, into the family of a salt weigher. As a child, he was often ill and had poor eyesight, which initially made his parents oppose his desire to draw.

Despite no initial prospects for higher education, Johann Christoph managed to enroll at the Görlitz Gymnasium. His father's employer, a man named Fritsche, took him into his home. During the day, Brotze attended school or gave private lessons, and in the evenings helped with bookkeeping—Fritsche was in charge of a military grain depot during the Seven Years’ War. With the money he earned, Brotze paid for private lessons in mathematics and geometry. He had already achieved notable skill in technical drawing, even producing city plans for official use.

After the Peace of Hubertusburg in 1763, which ended the Seven Years’ War, Brotze received a scholarship from the city council for his contributions, allowing him to study at university. With Fritsche's support, the scholarship was later increased. He began studying theology at the University of Leipzig, where he met the theologian and church historian Johann Matthias Schröckh. Brotze became the tutor of Schröckh's younger brother and later his private secretary.

When Schröckh moved to the University of Wittenberg, Brotze followed, enrolled, and within a year earned a Doctor of Philosophy (Dr. phil.) degree. During this period, he also trained as a draftsman and in technical drawing.

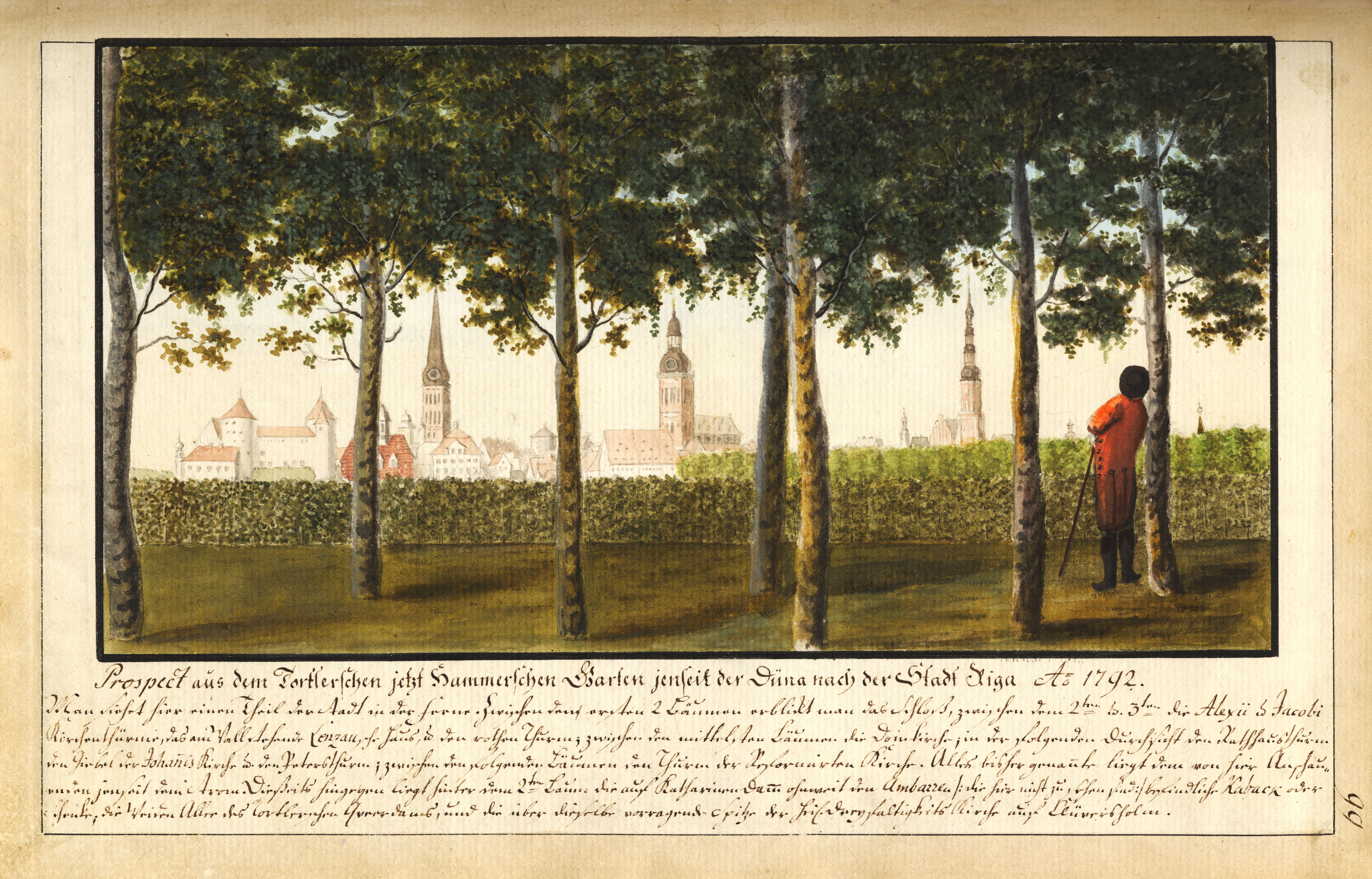
View of Riga from Pārdaugava drawn by Brotze in 1792

In 1768, Brotze accepted an offer to become a private tutor in Riga in Livonia, in the family of Eberhard von Vegesack, a city councillor and chief magistrate (Obervogt). He abandoned an academic career and arrived in Riga in December of that year. Fegesack's extensive library on Livonian history sparked Brotze's interest in Baltic history. This interest deepened after meeting other collectors of Baltic historical sources, such as the burgomaster Peter Schieffelbein and the pastor of Wenden (today Cēsis), Heinrich Bauman.

During that period he collected historical data and depicted in drawings and paintings everything he saw around him in his everyday life, as well as most buildings and monuments of significance in Livonia, supplemented with extensive descriptions. Today his works are considered an extremely valuable source of information for historians.

He worked as a tutor for less than a year. When a teaching position (subrector) opened at the Kaiserliches Lyzeum zu Riga (Riga Imperial Lyceum), Brotze applied—hoping, like his predecessor, to become a pastor eventually. He spent the next 46 years as a teacher. In 1783, after the death of the co-rector J. B. Erdmann, Brotze was promoted to co-rector, and in 1801, after the death of the rector F. W. Götz, he also served as acting rector. When the Lyceum was transformed into a gymnasium in 1804, he continued as a senior teacher (Oberlehrer). In 1808, he was granted the honorary title of Titular Councillor, which included certain privileges and eligibility for a state pension. In 1810, he was made an honorary member of the Riga Literary and Practical Citizens' Association. Brotze retired from active service in 1815.

He died in 1823 and was buried in the Great Cemetery of Riga. His tombstone, made of sandstone, was created by architect G. Kelli.

== Contribution ==
Throughout his life, Brotze continuously drew people, buildings, monuments, and objects, creating thousands of detailed illustrations and manuscript copies, documenting the social and cultural life of his time with remarkable accuracy. His work is characterized by classical composition and decorative style, often featuring cartouches and staffage in his landscapes. He wrote and published numerous articles on the history of Riga, Livonia, Courland, and Estonia—over 100 in total.

His most significant work is the ten-volume “Collection of Various Livonian Monuments, Views, Coins, Coats of Arms, etc.” (Sammlung verschiedener Liefländischer Monumente, Prospecte, Münzen, Wappen etc.). It contains over 2,000 illustrated and described historical items, many of which no longer exist, making the collection a unique and invaluable resource for historians.

== Works ==
- Zeichnungen und deren Beschreibungen

=== Books ===
- Sammlung verschiedener Liefländischer Monumente, Prospecte, Münzen, Wappen, etc.

== Gallery ==
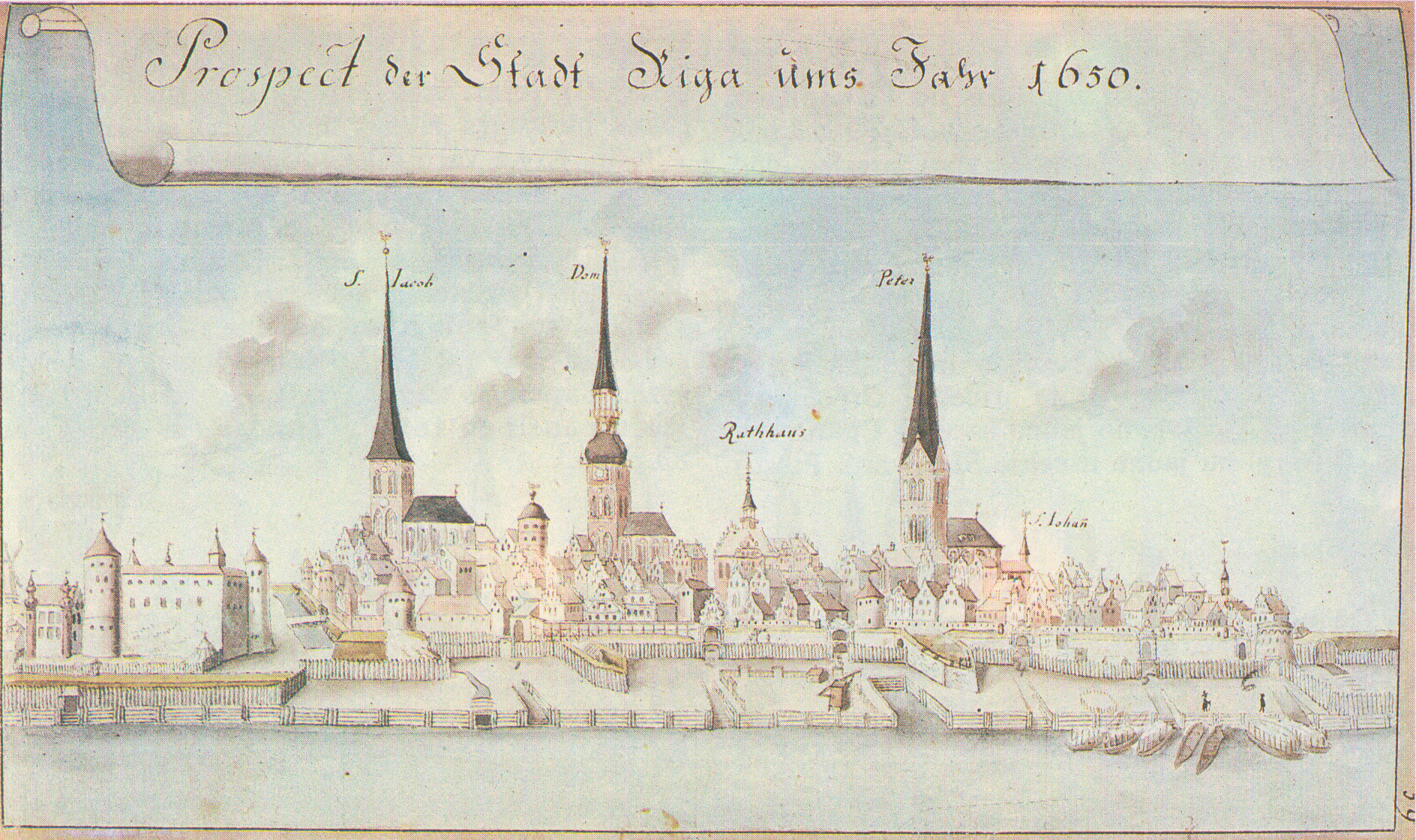
Panorama of Riga in 1650

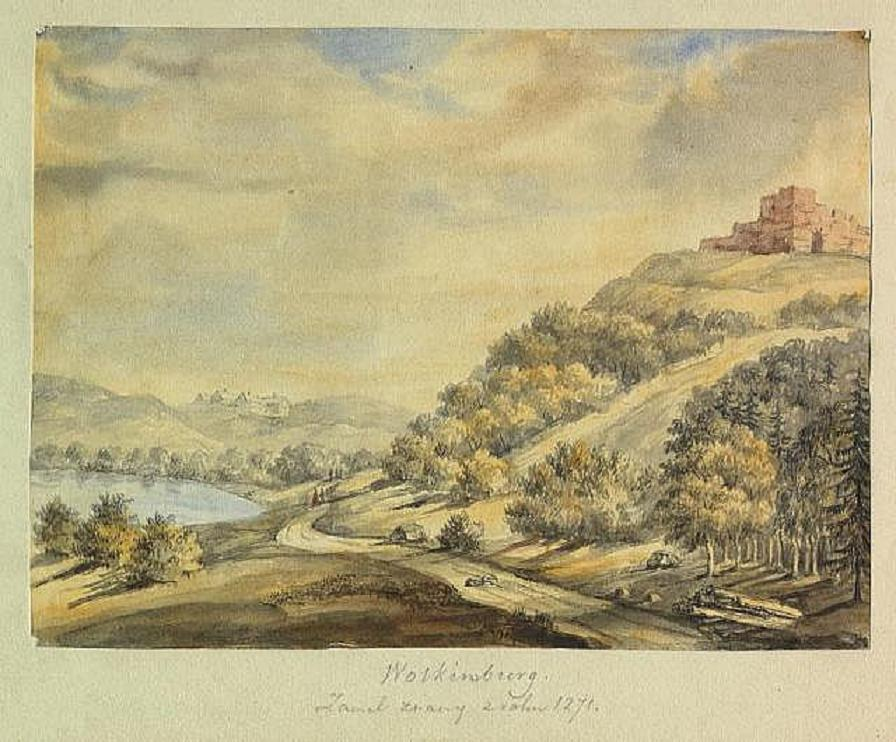

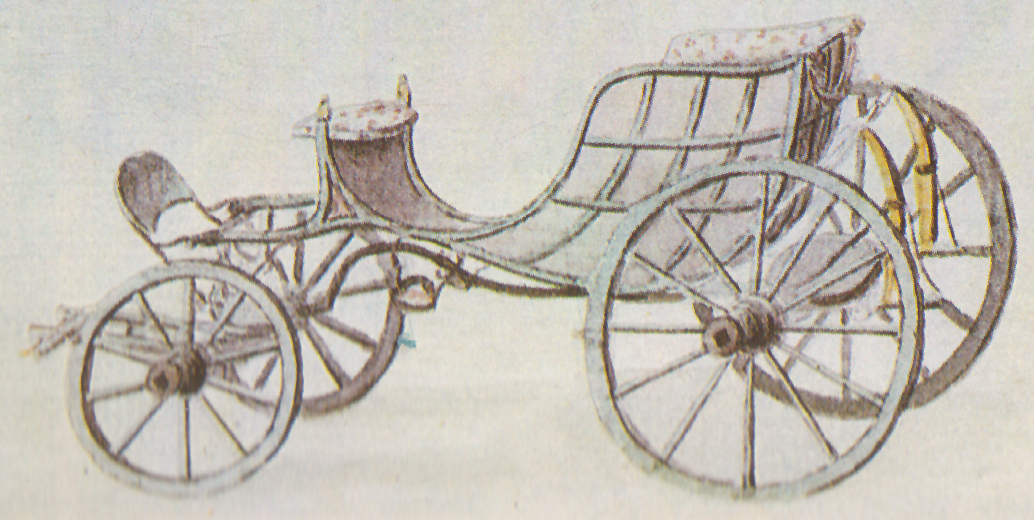

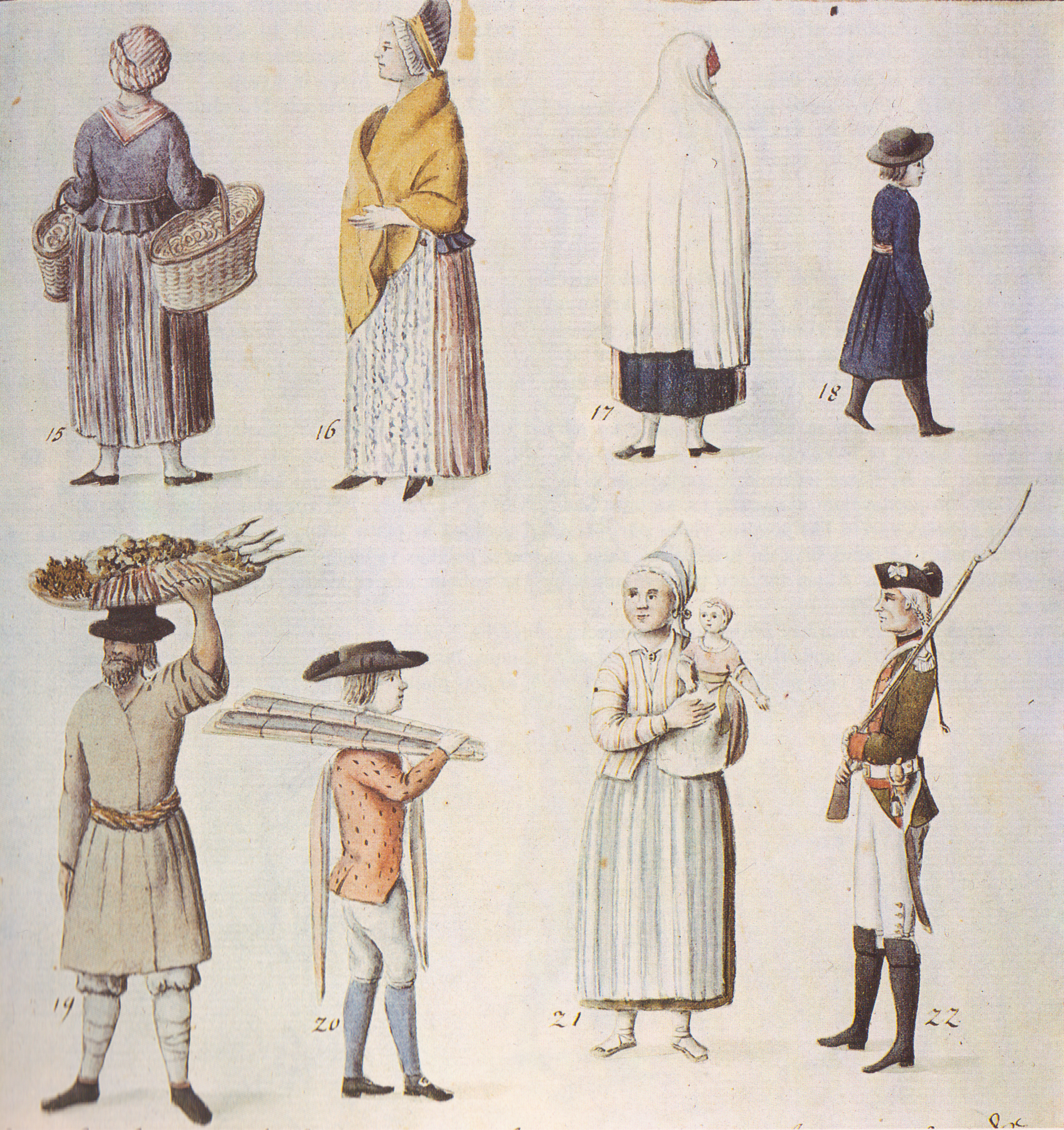
People in the streets in Riga

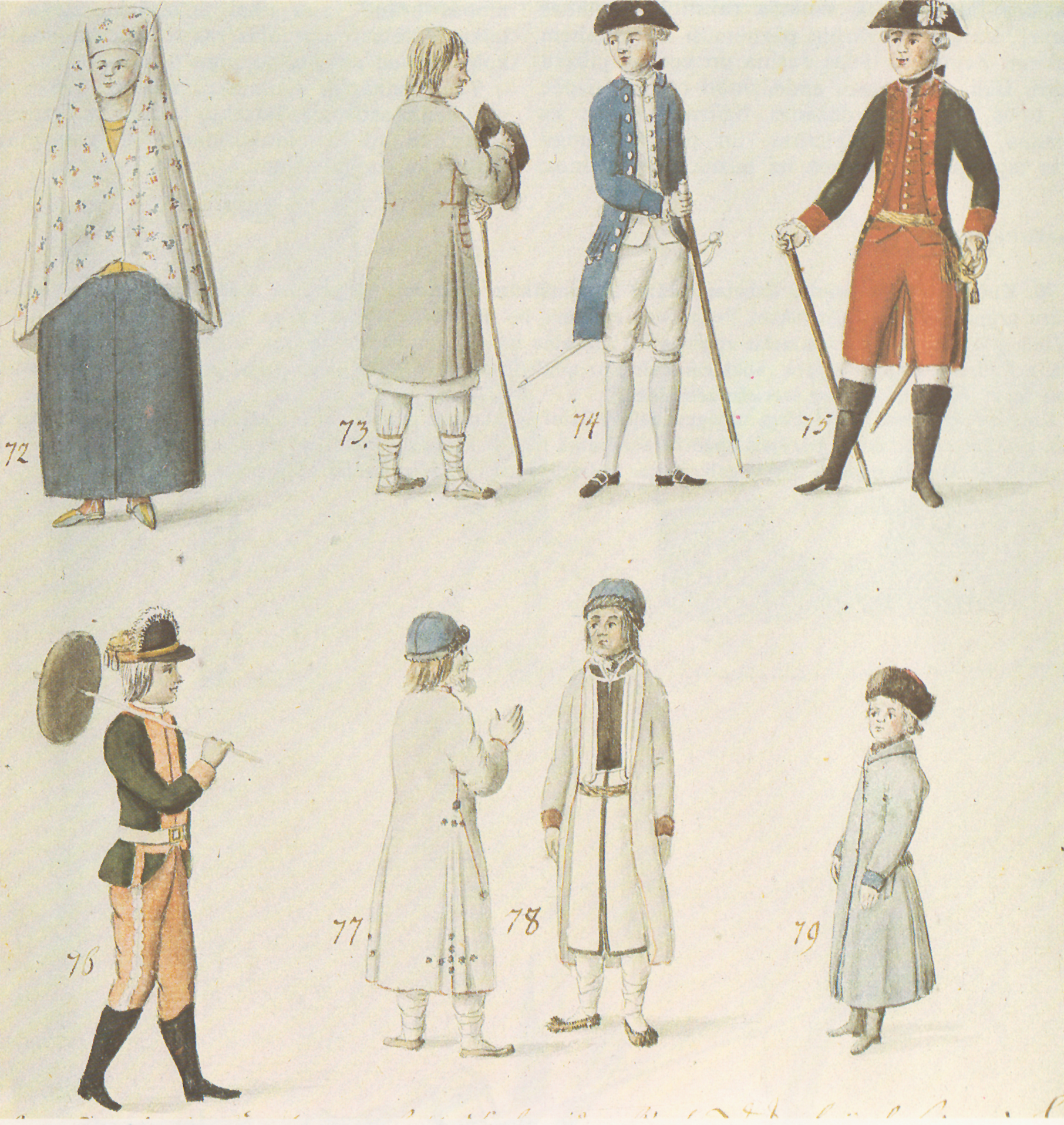

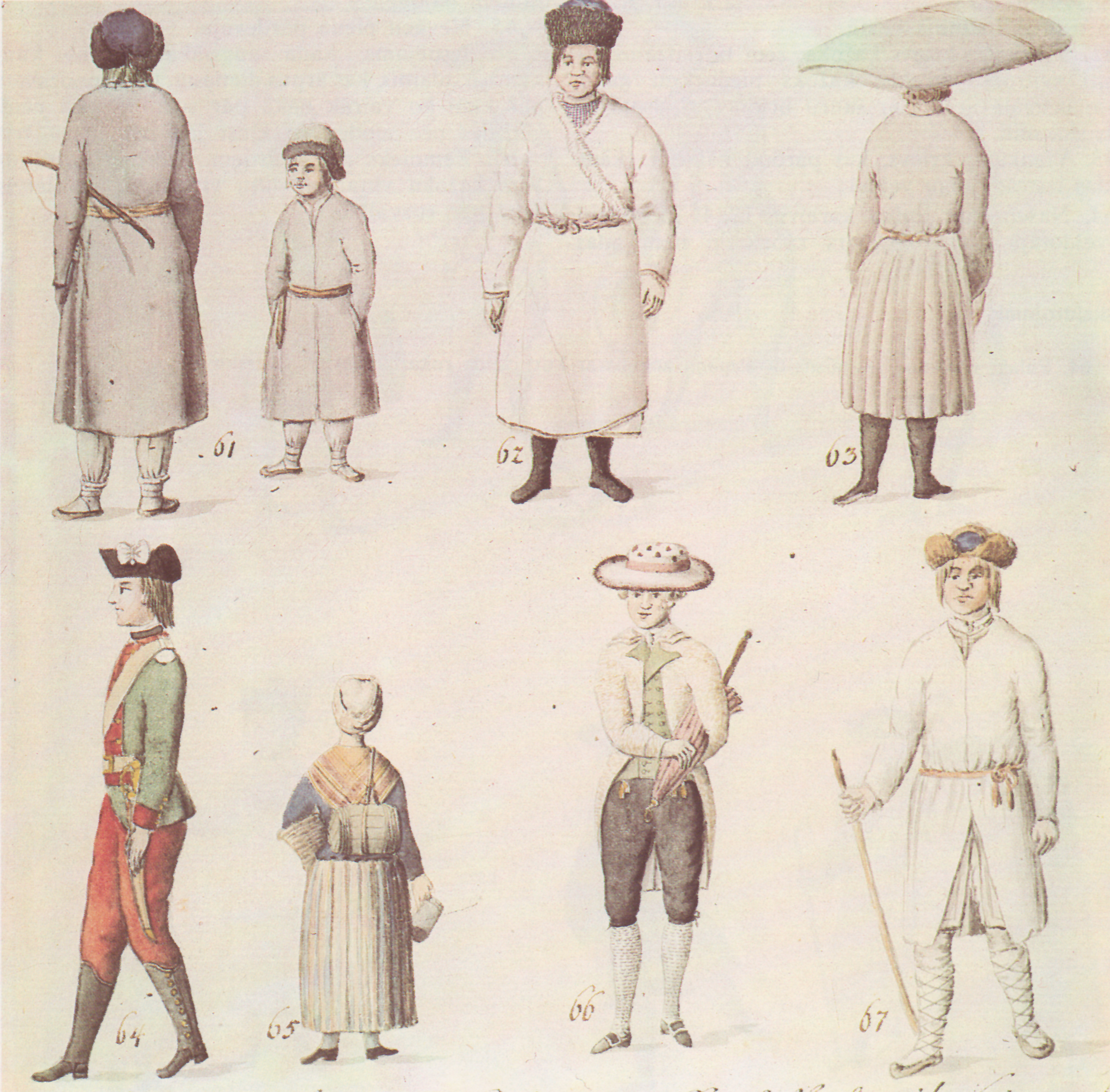

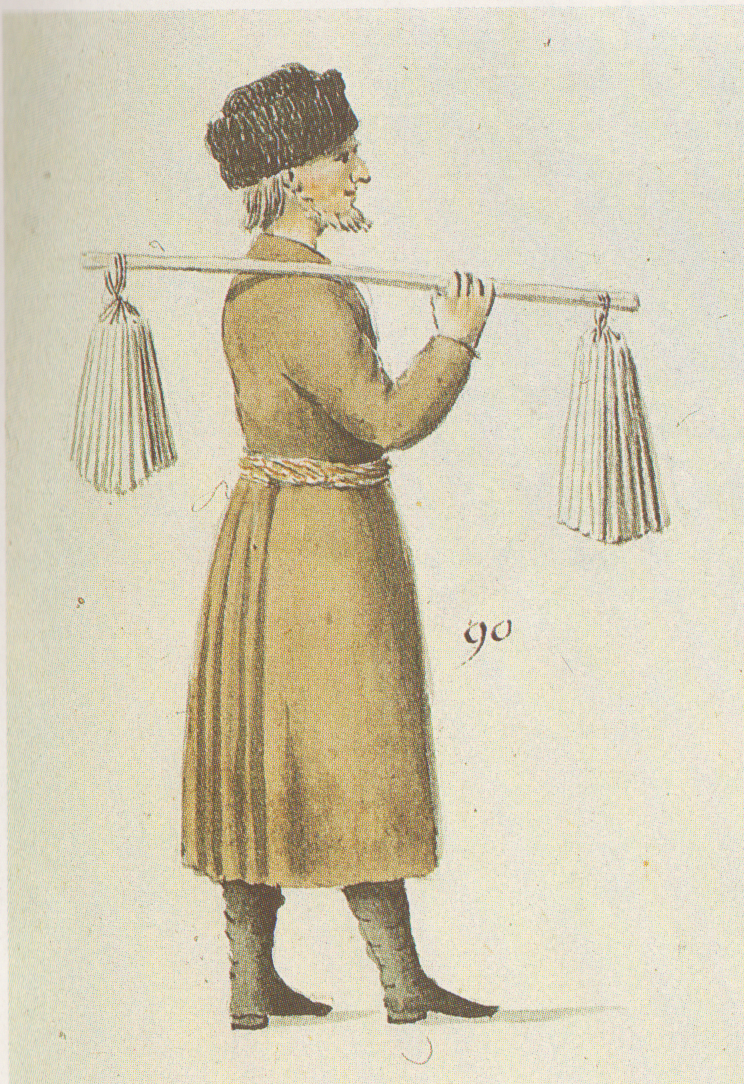
Russian candle seller

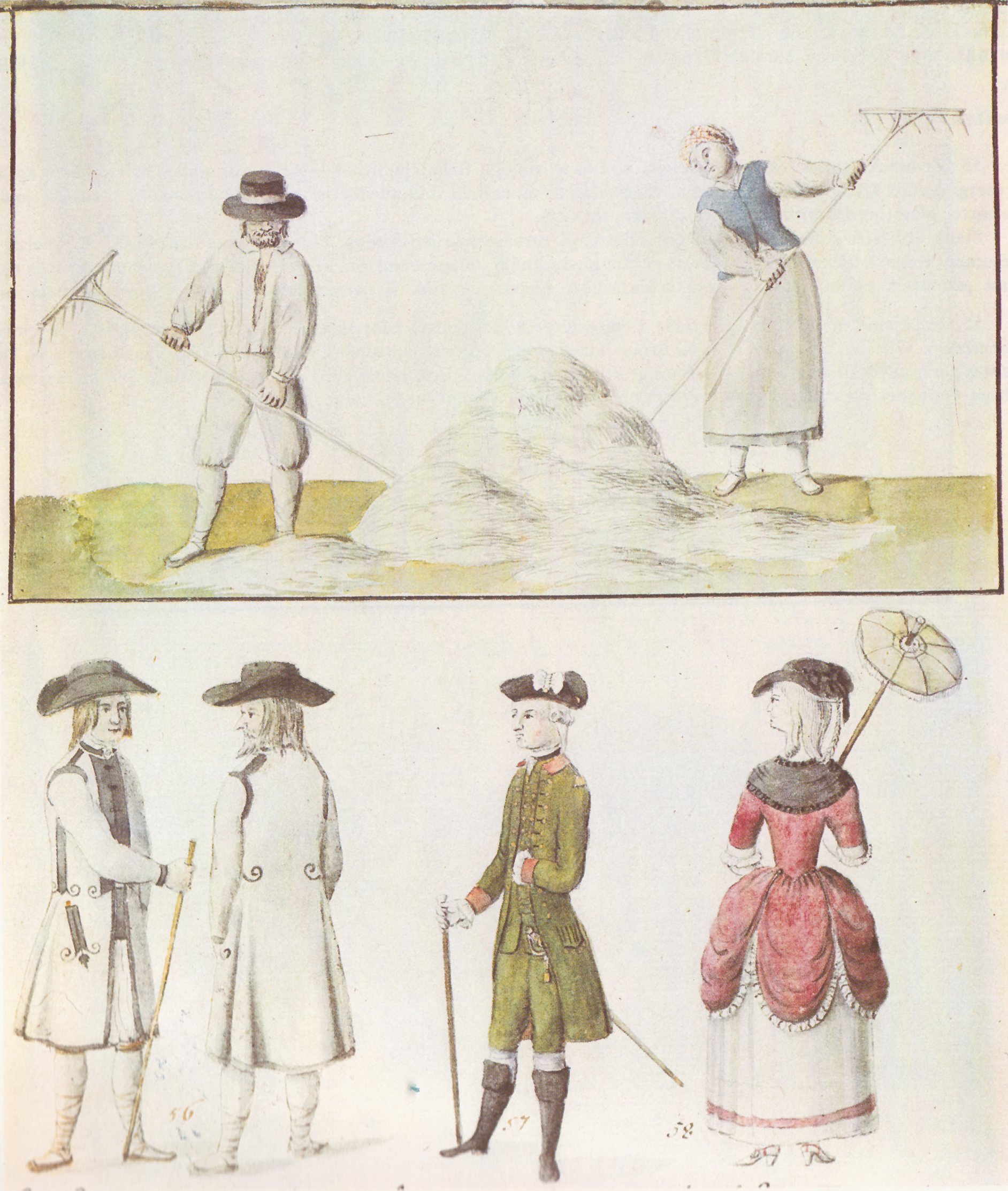

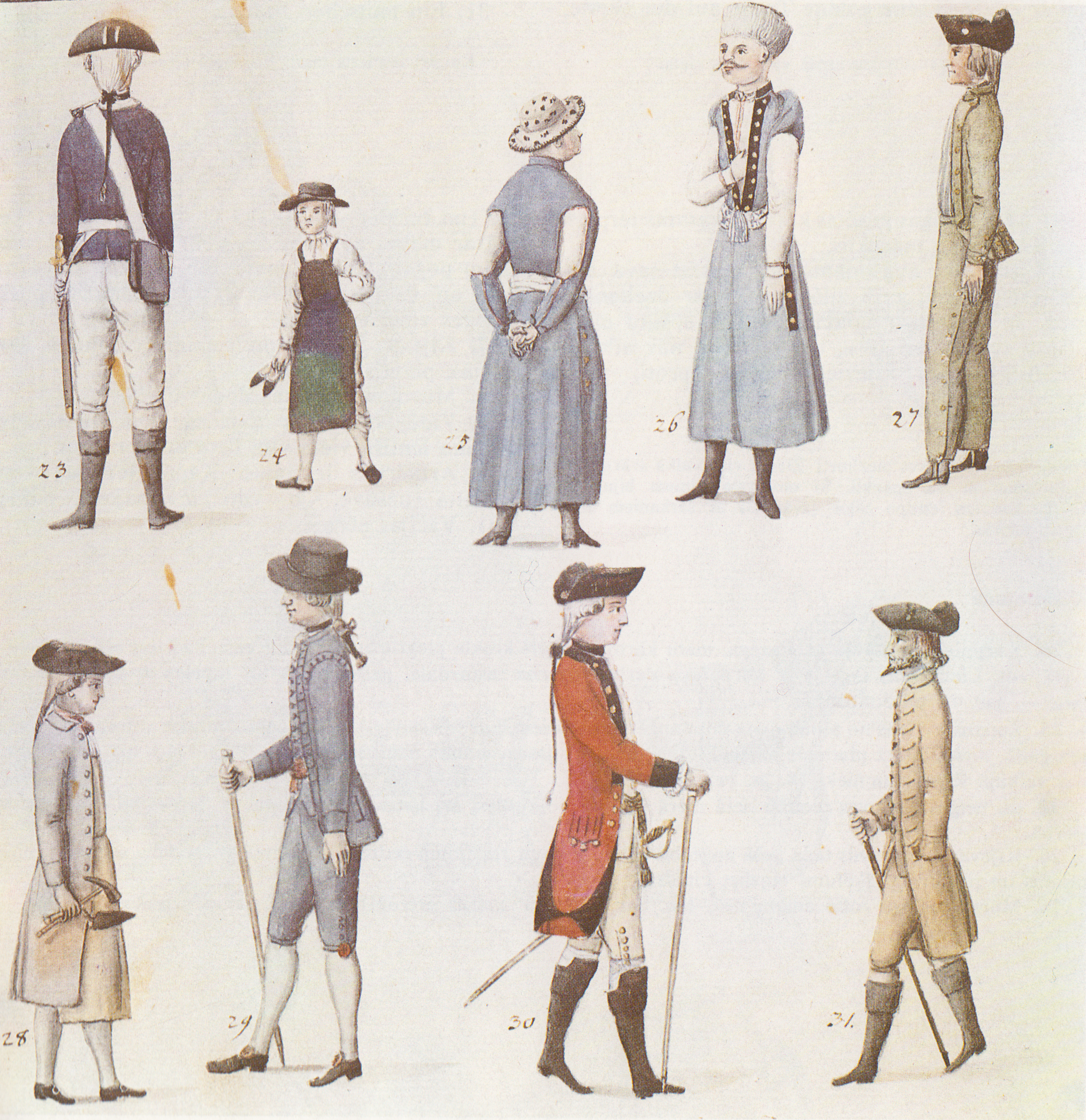

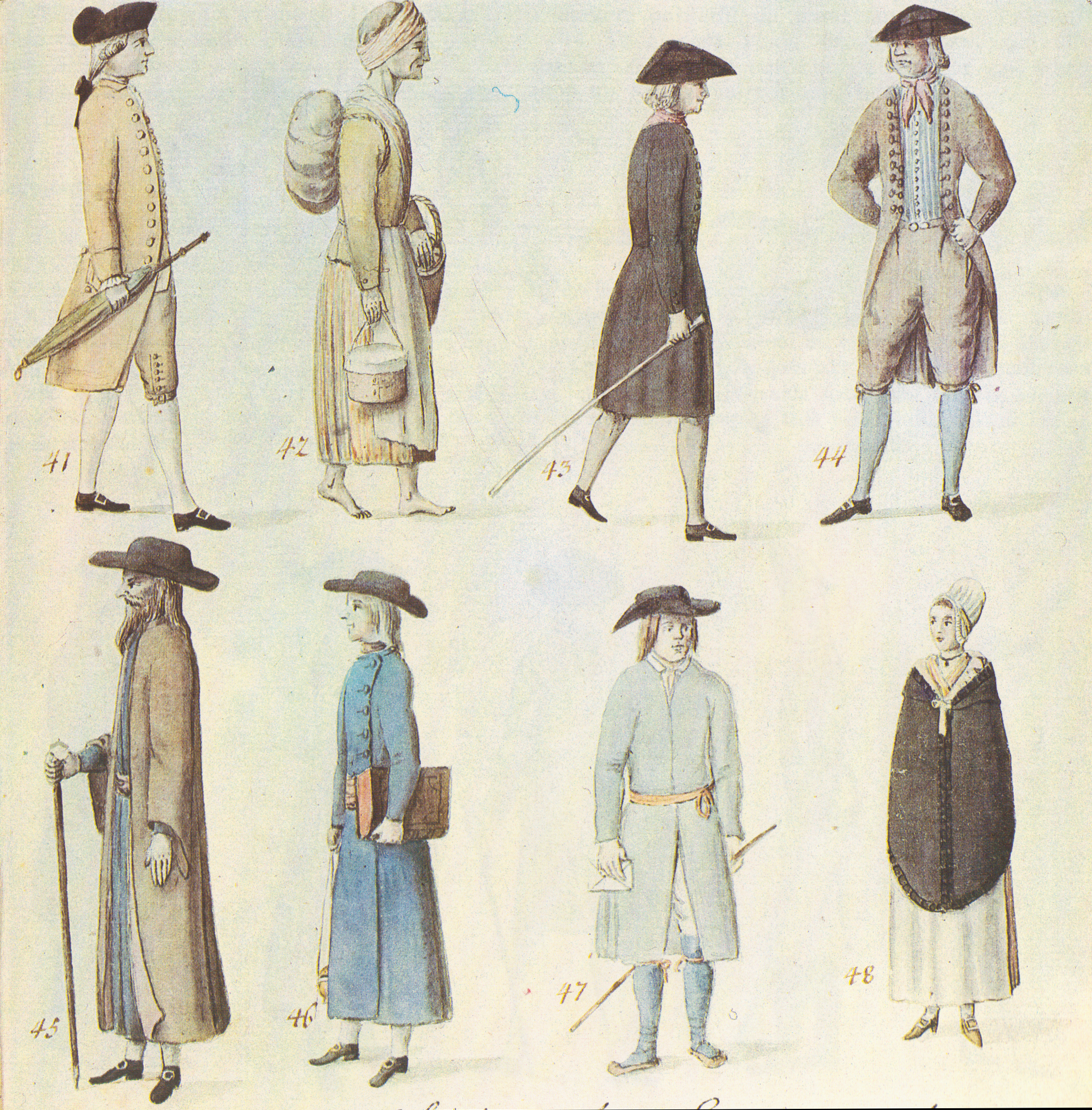

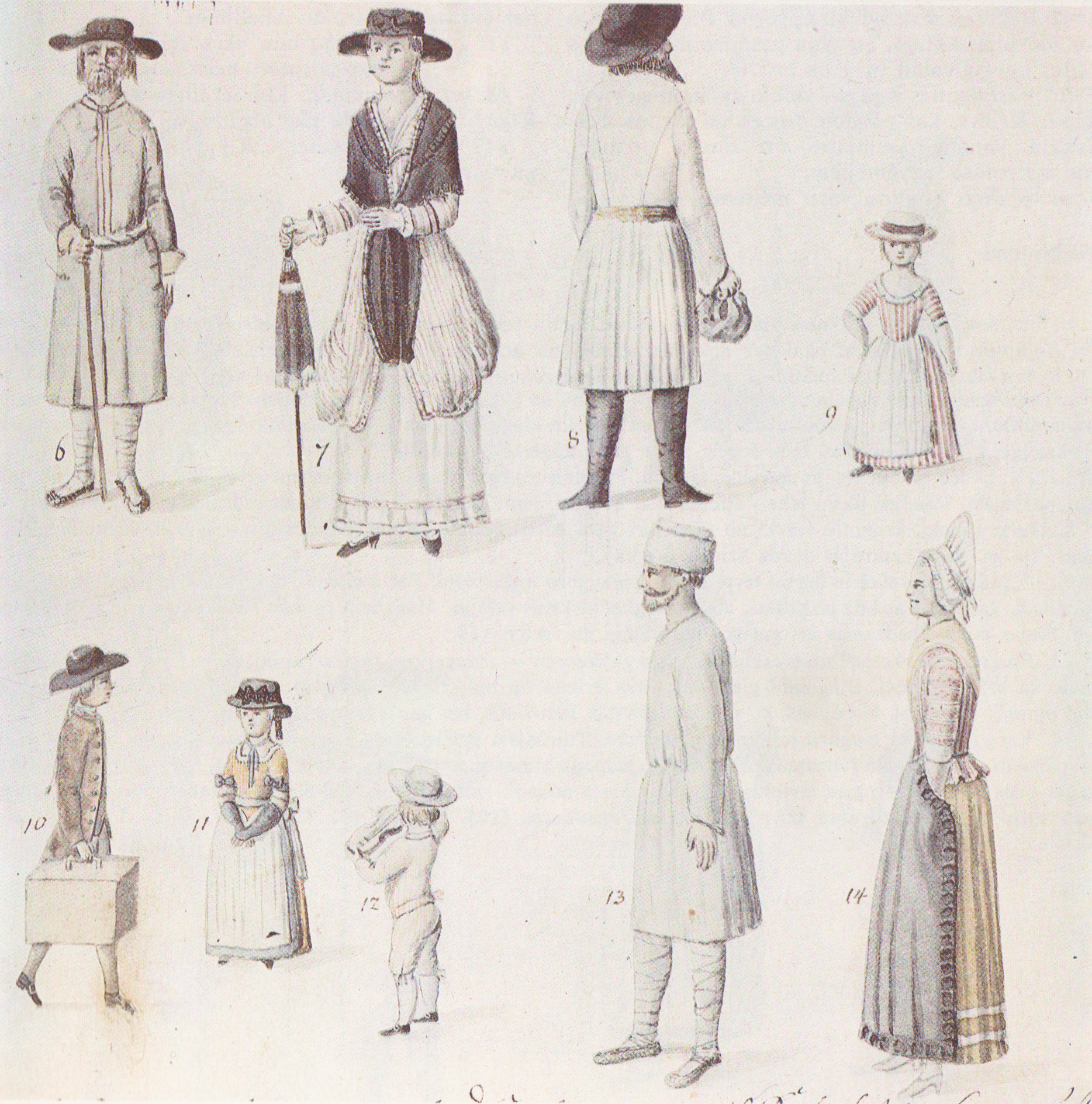

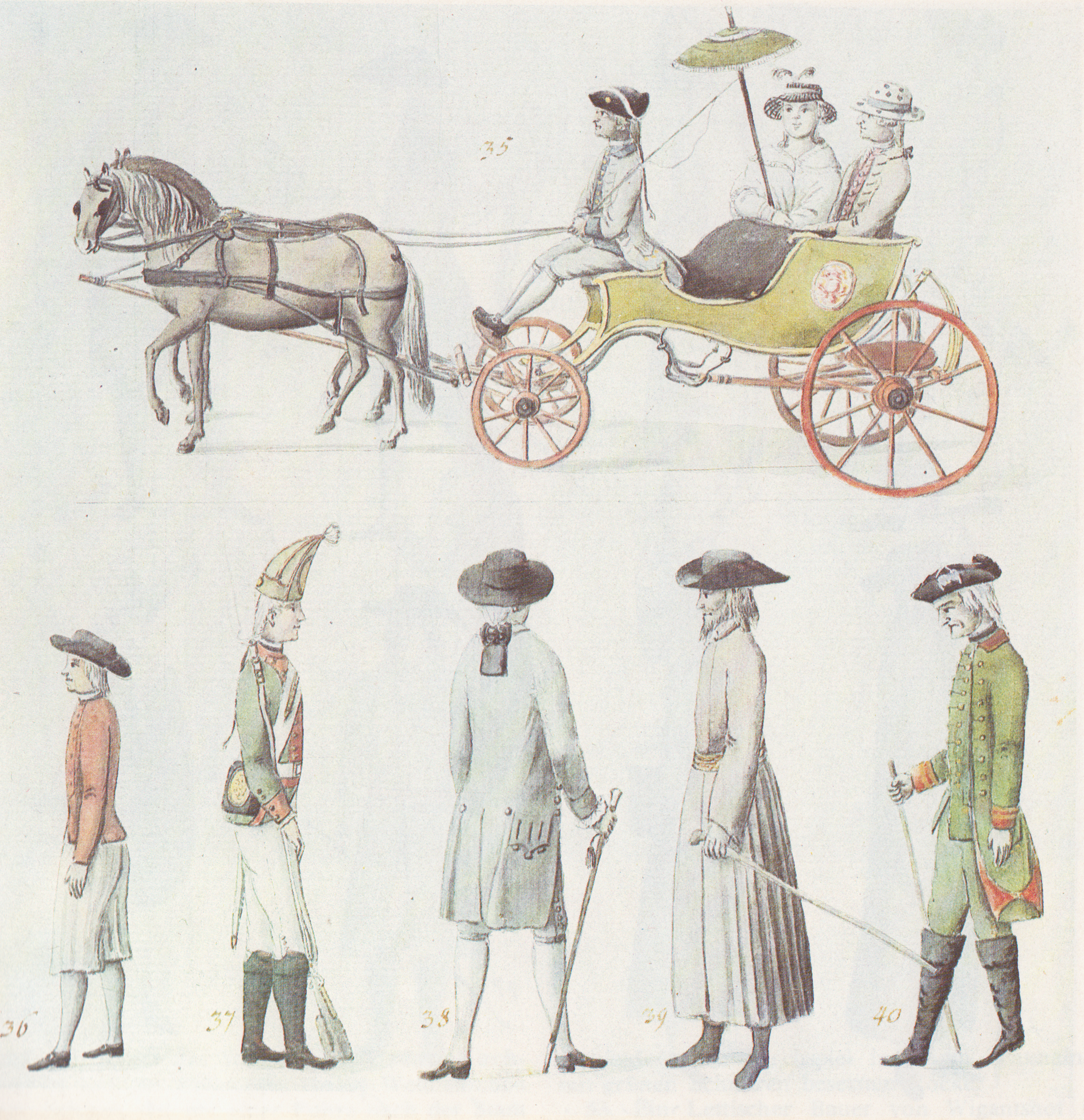

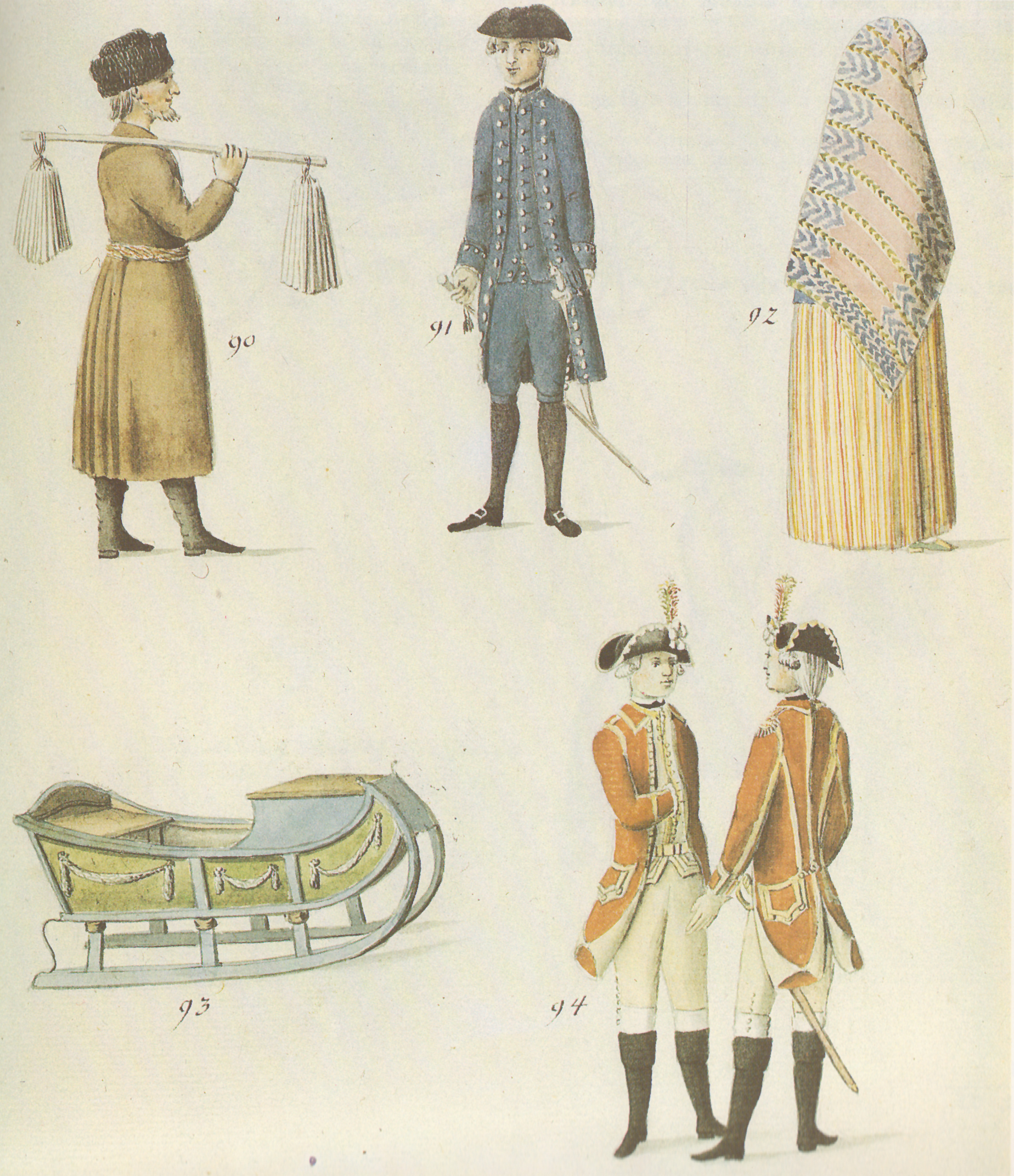

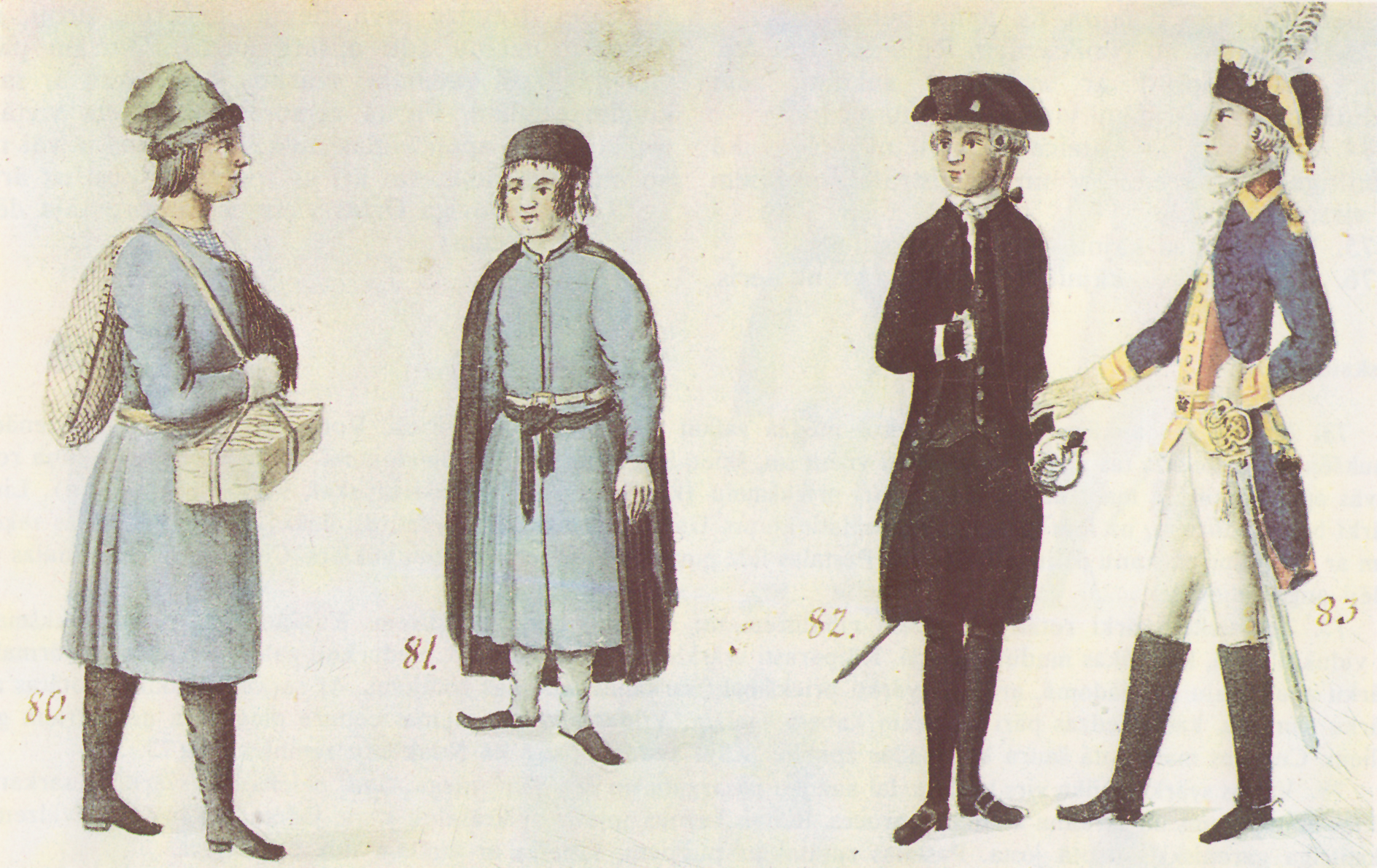

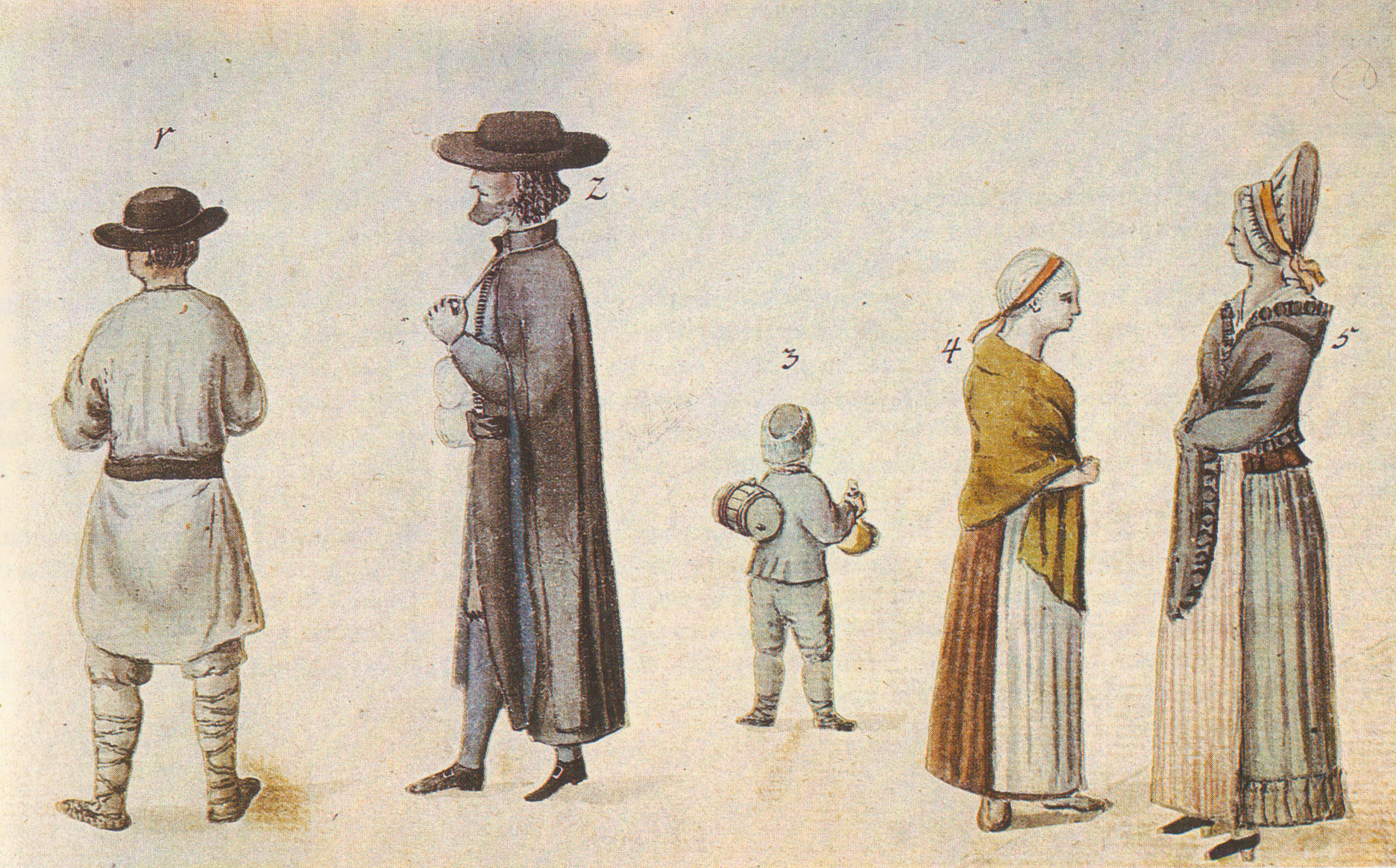

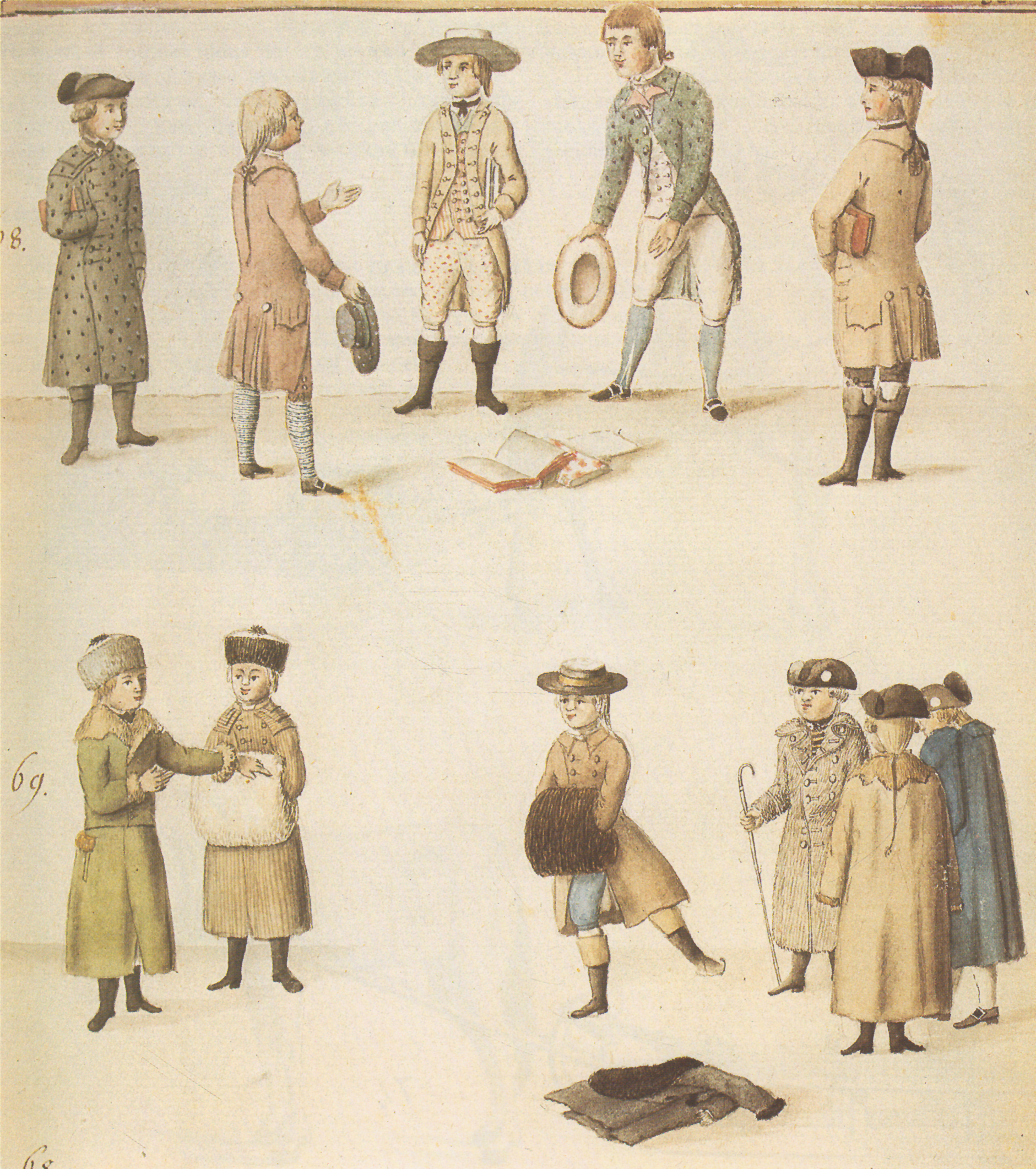

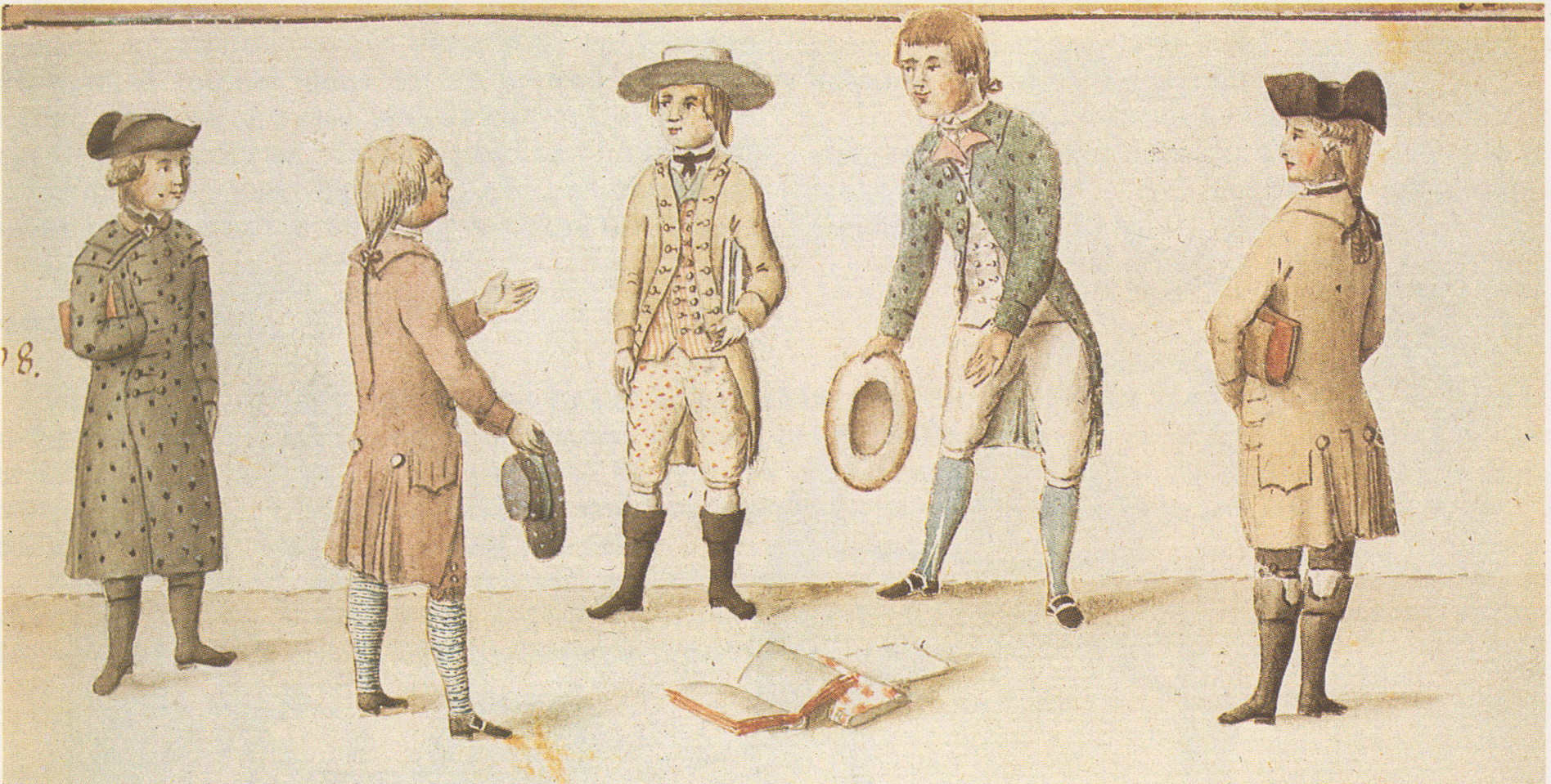
Boys' summer clothes in Riga

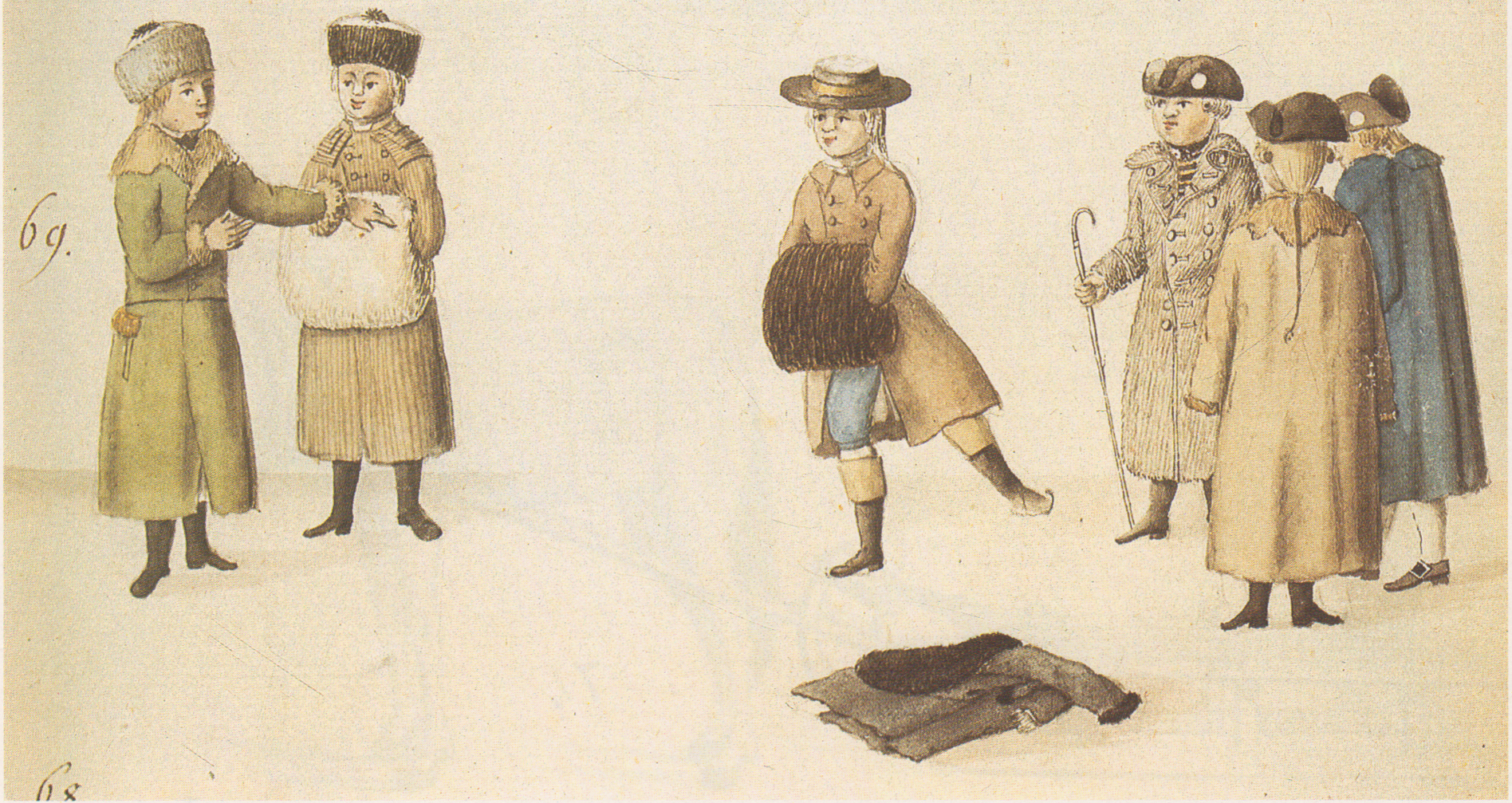
Boys' winter clothes in Riga

== See also ==
- Ethnography
- Baltic Germans
