= Battle of Lappfjärd =

1808 battle of the Finnish War

- Part of the Finnish War
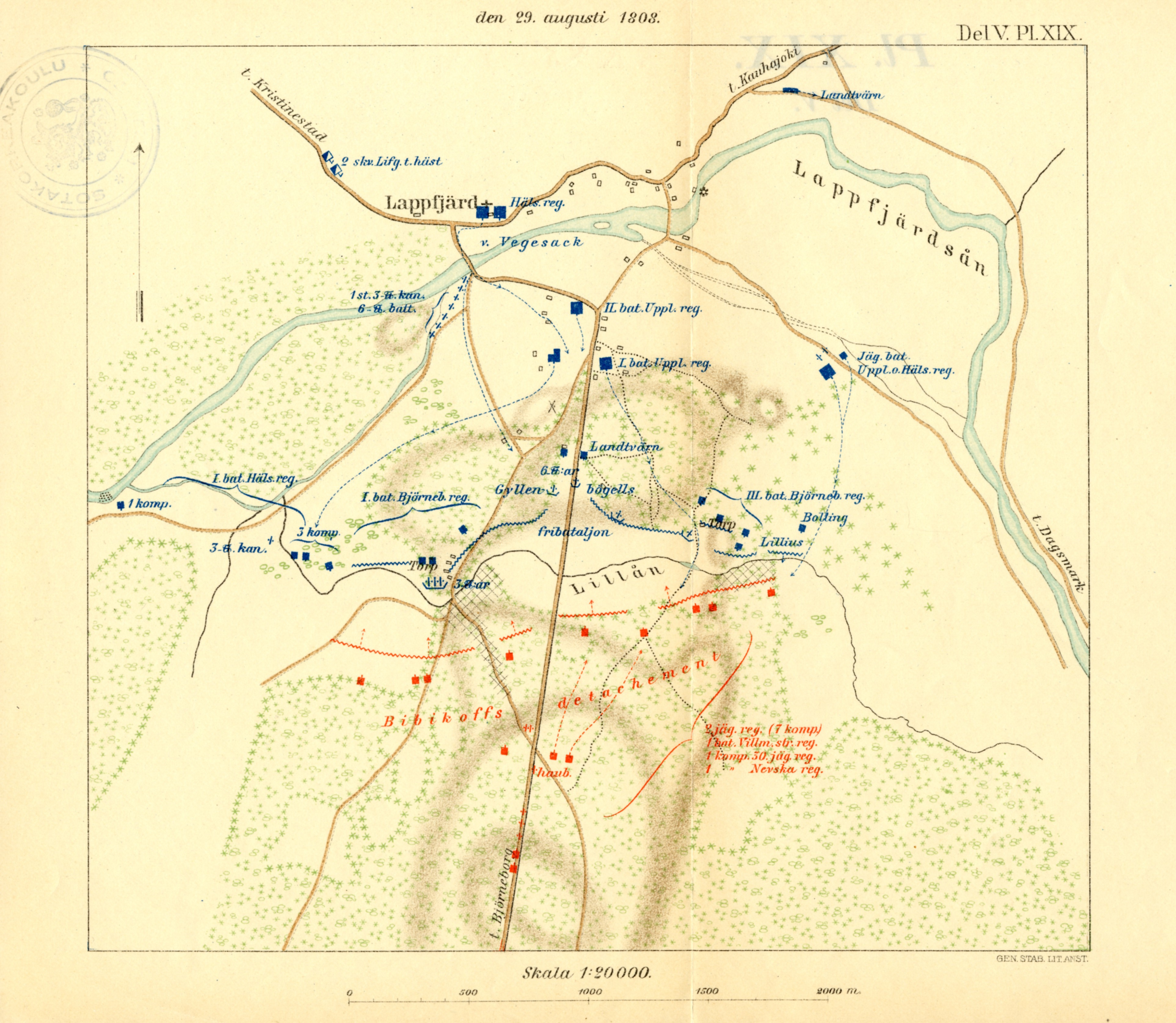
- Dispositions at the battle
Date	29 August 1808
Location	Lappfjärd, Finland
Result	Swedish victory

Belligerents
Sweden	Russian Empire

Commanders and leaders
Eberhard von Vegesack	(Russian Empire) General Bibikov

Strength
5,400; 15 guns	2,150; 6 guns

Casualties and losses
113 killed or wounded	153 killed or wounded 82 captured

The Battle of Lappfjärd was fought between Swedish and Russian forces at Lappfjärd in Finland on 29 August 1808 during the Finnish War.

== Background ==
Upon hearing the news of Koslov's attack at Nummijärvi, Russian General Bibikov (positioned at Ömossa, south of Lappfjärd), likewise decided to attack, with 2,150 men of his own, thinking his numerical superiority could easily overwhelm the Swedish troops at Lappfjärd. Unbeknownst to Bibikov, however, he would march against a Swedish force more than twice the size of his own, under Eberhard von Vegesack, who had landed at Kristinestad with 3,000 men, on 28 August, and taken command over the troops at Lappfjärd.

=== Swedish forces ===
- Björneborg Infantry Regiment (2 battalions)
- Hälsinge Infantry Regiment (3 battalions)
- Uppland Infantry Regiment (2 battalions)
- Gyllenbögel Infantry Regiment (2 battalions)
- Närpe and Malak Landwehr (3 companies)
- A small contingent of the Jämtland and Västerbotten Infantry Regiments
- Life Guards of Horse (2 squadrons)
- Svea and Finnish Artillery Regiments (15 guns)

In total: 5,400 men and 15 guns

== Battle ==
The Russian army under General Bibikov counted 2,150 men with six guns, while von Vegesack's total force numbered 5,400 men with 15 guns — although far from all the Swedish troops would be engaged in the forthcoming battle. On 29 August the Russians launched a fruitless attack on the Swedes; attempts were made to force the Swedish flanks to give way, but in vain. After four hours of fighting the Swedish commander ordered a counterattack which forced the Russians to retreat; the battle had played out much like the fighting the day earlier, at Nummijärvi. The Russians retreated with a loss of 153 men killed or wounded while 82 had been captured by the Swedes; who had sustained 113 killed or wounded. The main Swedish army then fought the Battles of Ruona and Salmi, on 1–2 September 1808, which severely crippled the Swedish war effort in Finland.

== Aftermath ==
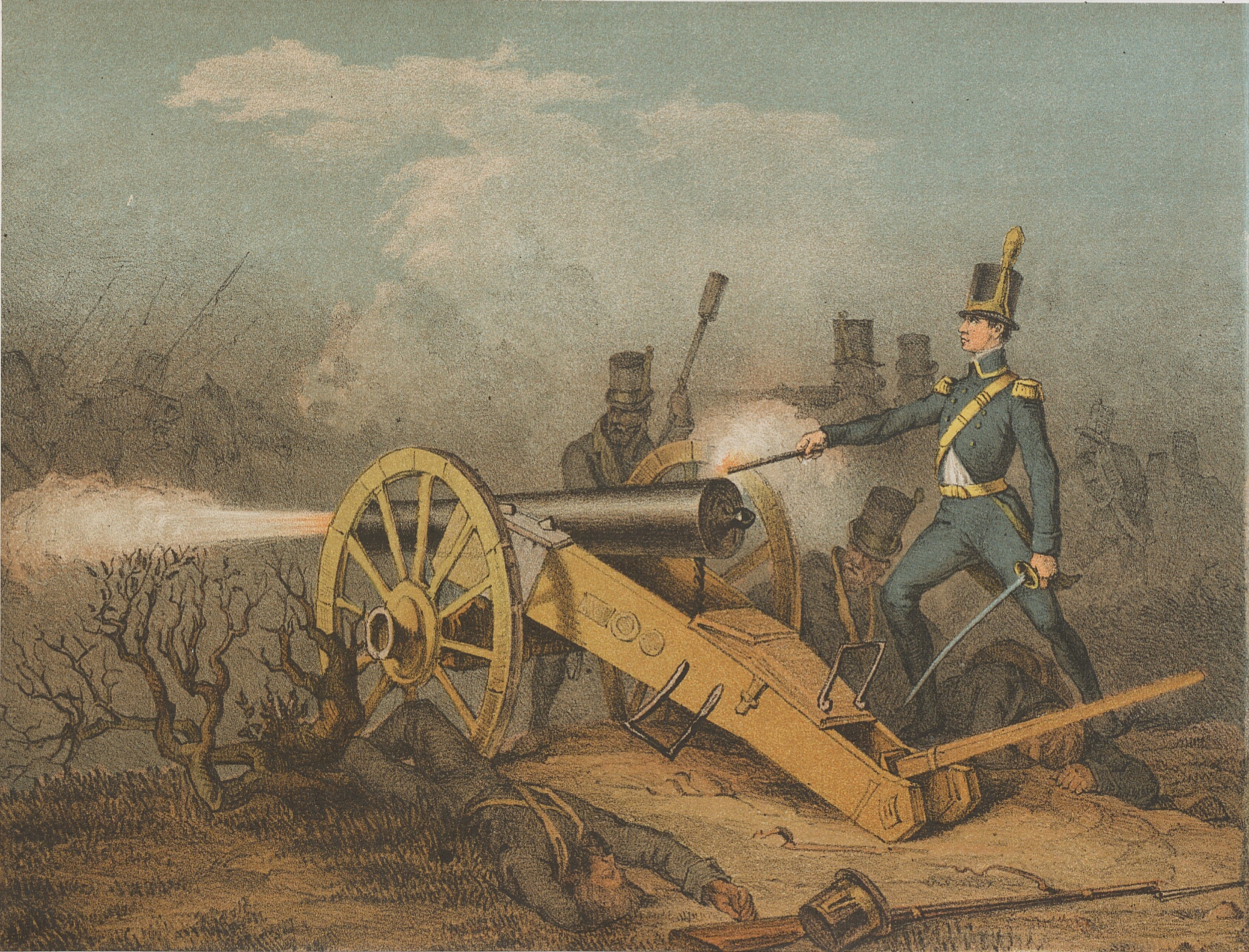
Wilhelm von Schwerin at Ömossa, by Carl Staaff

At Lappfjärd the Swedish commander, von Vegesack, had greatly overestimated the Russian strength and thus failed to deliver a crushing defeat. A Swedish outpost was soon established at Ömossa which consisted of one battalion from the Uppland Infantry Regiment and two guns from the Svea Artillery Regiment, led by Wilhelm von Schwerin; it was attacked by Bibikov with 1,500 men and six guns, on 6 September. The Swedes were forced back with a loss of 64 killed or wounded, but not before several Russian attacks had been repulsed (among others, made by the Cossack Life Guards Regiment). Schwerin's stubborn defense at the guns allowed the Swedes to retreat in good order.

== Citations and sources ==
=== Sources ===
- Hornborg, Eirik (1955). När riket sprängdes: fälttågen i Finland och Västerbotten, 1808-1809 (in Swedish). Stockholm: P. A. Norstedts och Söners Förlag.
