= Battle of Nummijärvi =

1808 battle of the Finnish War

- Part of the Finnish War
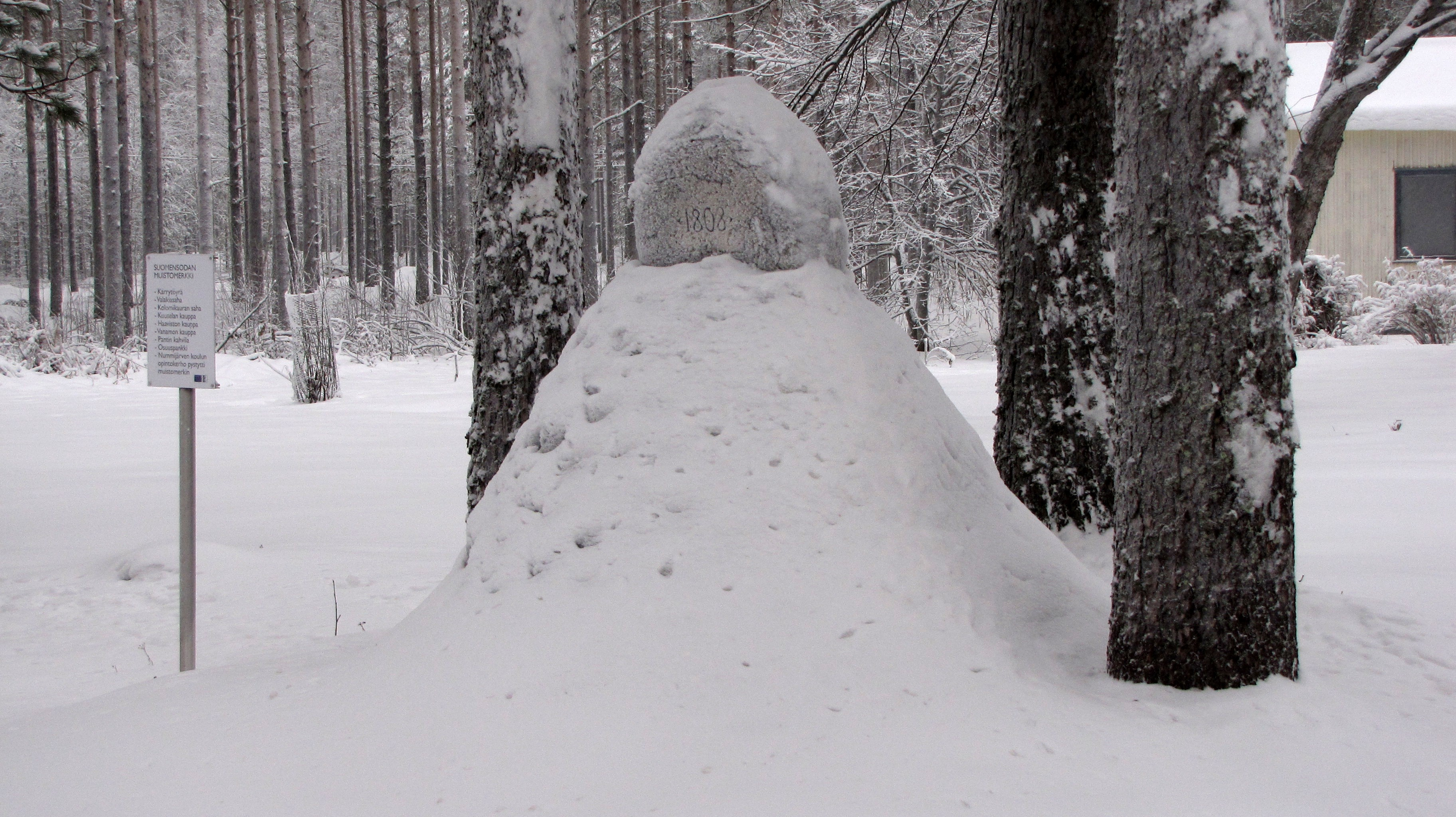
- Memorial of the Battle in Kauhajoki, Finland.
Date	28 August 1808
Location	Nummijärvi, Finland
Result	Swedish victory

Belligerents
Sweden	Russian Empire

Commanders and leaders
Carl von Otter	(Russian Empire) General-major Ushakov (Russian Empire) Colonel Koslov

Strength
1,250; 4 guns	1,500; 2 guns

Casualties and losses
94 killed or wounded	206 killed or wounded 48 captured

The Battle of Nummijärvi was fought between Swedish and Russian forces at Nummijärvi in Finland on 28 August 1808 during the Finnish War.

== Background ==
After the Swedish main army under Carl Johan Adlercreutz had won at the Battle of Alavus the newly appointed Russian commander, Nikolay Mikhailovich Kamensky, shifted his focus from the Swedish left—the Swedish force near Karstula under Otto von Fieandt—towards their center at Alavus, while only smaller contingents were ordered to engage the Swedish flanks; von Fieandt was defeated at the Battle of Karstula by Yegor Vlastov, which brought an end to the Swedish hopes of holding the two-way intersection at Lintulaks; another Russian force under Colonel Koslov meanwhile marched to engage Carl von Otter on the Swedish right flank, at Nummijärvi (hardly two Scandinavian miles southeast of the Kauhajoki church).

=== Swedish forces ===
Apart from a 100-man strong Landwehr and a contingent of dragoons, von Otter's force consisted of:

- Österbotten Infantry Regiment (One battalion of five companies)
- Björneborg Infantry Regiment (One battalion)
- Finnish Artillery Regiment (Four guns)

In total: 1,250 men and 4 guns

== Battle ==
Koslov brought 1,500 men and 2 guns with him to beat von Otter's forces of 1,250 men with 4 guns and to capture the road junction by the church. The Swedes received him in a formation that crossed over the highway with its right flank protected by the Nummijärvi lake and the front by a small stream. At 5:00 p.m. Koslov attacked along their whole line, but as he had left a significant number of troops in reserve the attack did not achieve enough weight to break through the Swedish lines, for which reason it stalled; von Otter then seized the initiative and counterattacked with his whole force and by 9:00 p.m. the Russians were forced to retreat. Their loss had reached 200 privates and six officers dead and wounded while 46 privates and two officers had been captured while von Otter had sustained 90 privates and four officers dead and wounded. Encouraged by Koslov's offensive, General Bibikov attacked the Swedish position at Lappfjärd the next day; however, as the Swedes received 3,000 reinforcements under Eberhard von Vegesack just earlier, Bibikov's force would run into a brick wall.

== Aftermath ==
The Swedes abandoned their position at Nummijärvi after the battle at Lappfjärd, as the 2nd Swedish division received orders from the Swedish headquarters to join up with the Swedish main army at Kuortane, in advance of the Battles of Salmi and Ruona; however, due to a series of conflicting orders and misunderstanding the 2nd division did not reach the Swedish main army in time before the battle—while the road junction at Kauhajoki was easily captured by Usjakov as the 150 defenders were forced to retreat with a loss of 25 men. The Russians had lost 40 men.

== Citations and sources ==
=== Sources ===
- Hornborg, Eirik (1955). När riket sprängdes: fälttågen i Finland och Västerbotten, 1808-1809 (in Swedish). Stockholm: P. A. Norstedts och Söners Förlag.
