= Lappfjärd =

Lappfjärd Lapväärtti
- Village
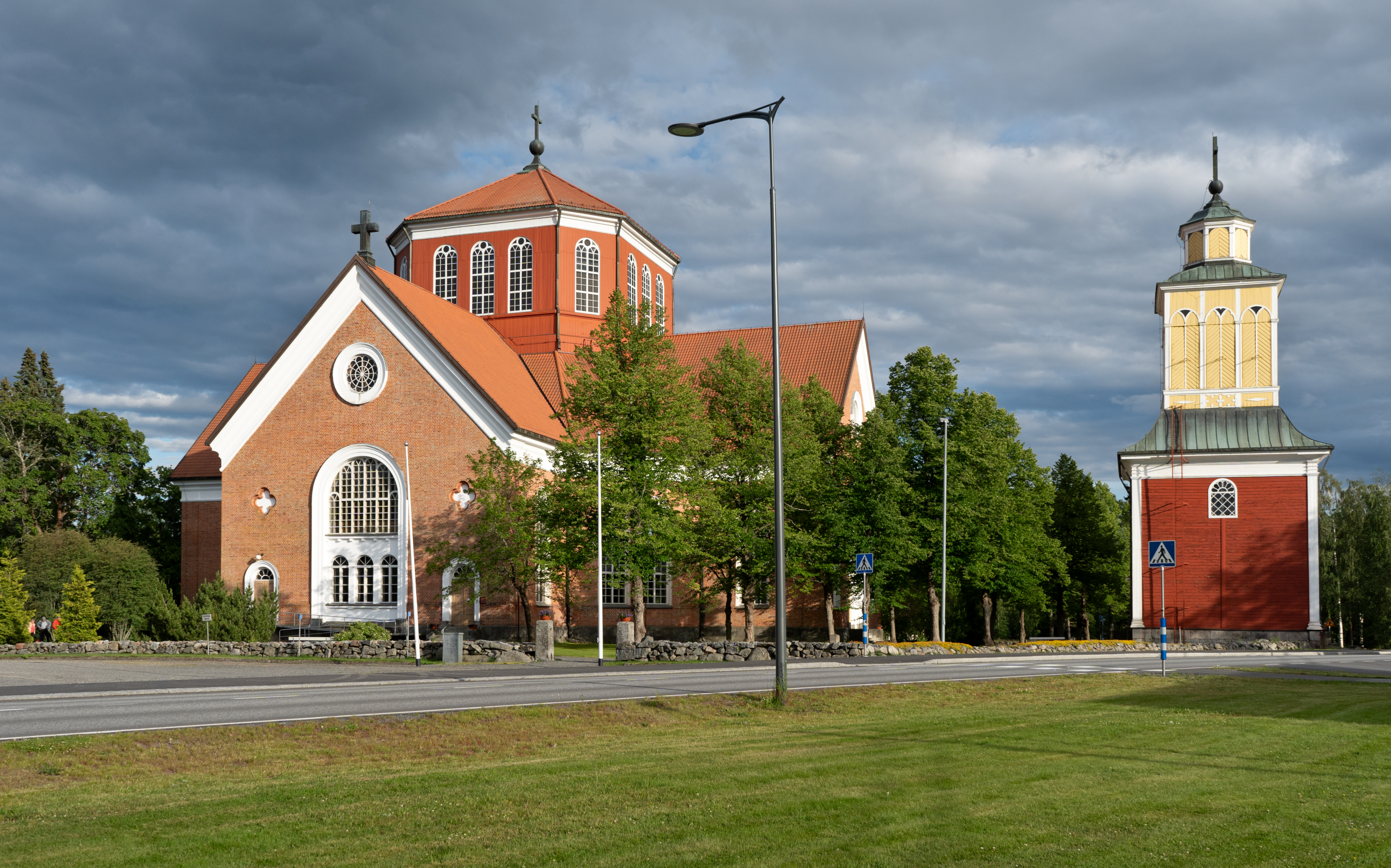
- A church and bell tower of Lappfjärd

- Location in Finland
- Coordinates: 62°15′01″N 21°31′18″E
- Country: Finland
- Region: Ostrobothnia
- Municipality: Kristinestad

Area
  - Total: 10.93 km^{2} (4.22 sq mi)

Population (31 December 2023)
  - Total: 1,408
  - Density: 128.8/km^{2} (334/sq mi)
- Time zone: UTC+2 (EET)
  - Summer (DST): UTC+3 (EEST)
- Postal code: 64300

Lappfjärd (Finland Swedish: [lɑpˌfjæːɖ]; Finnish: Lapväärtti [ˈlɑpʋæːrtːi]) is a village in the town of Kristinestad in Ostrobothnia, Finland. It was former administrative center of the former Lappfjärd municipality. It has over 1,400 inhabitants. Highway 8 (E8) passes the village on its western side.

The village is home to a church built of plastered brick from 1851, designed by Ernst Lohrmann. The village also has two grocery stores (K-Market and Sale), two restaurants and café, a firestation, a primary school, and a farmhouse called Wanha Tupa for overnight stays.

== See also ==
- Battle of Lappfjärd
