= Kristinestad City Hall =

Municipal HQ of Kristinestad, Finland

Kristinestad city hall
- Kristinestads rådhus / Kristiinankaupungin raatihuone
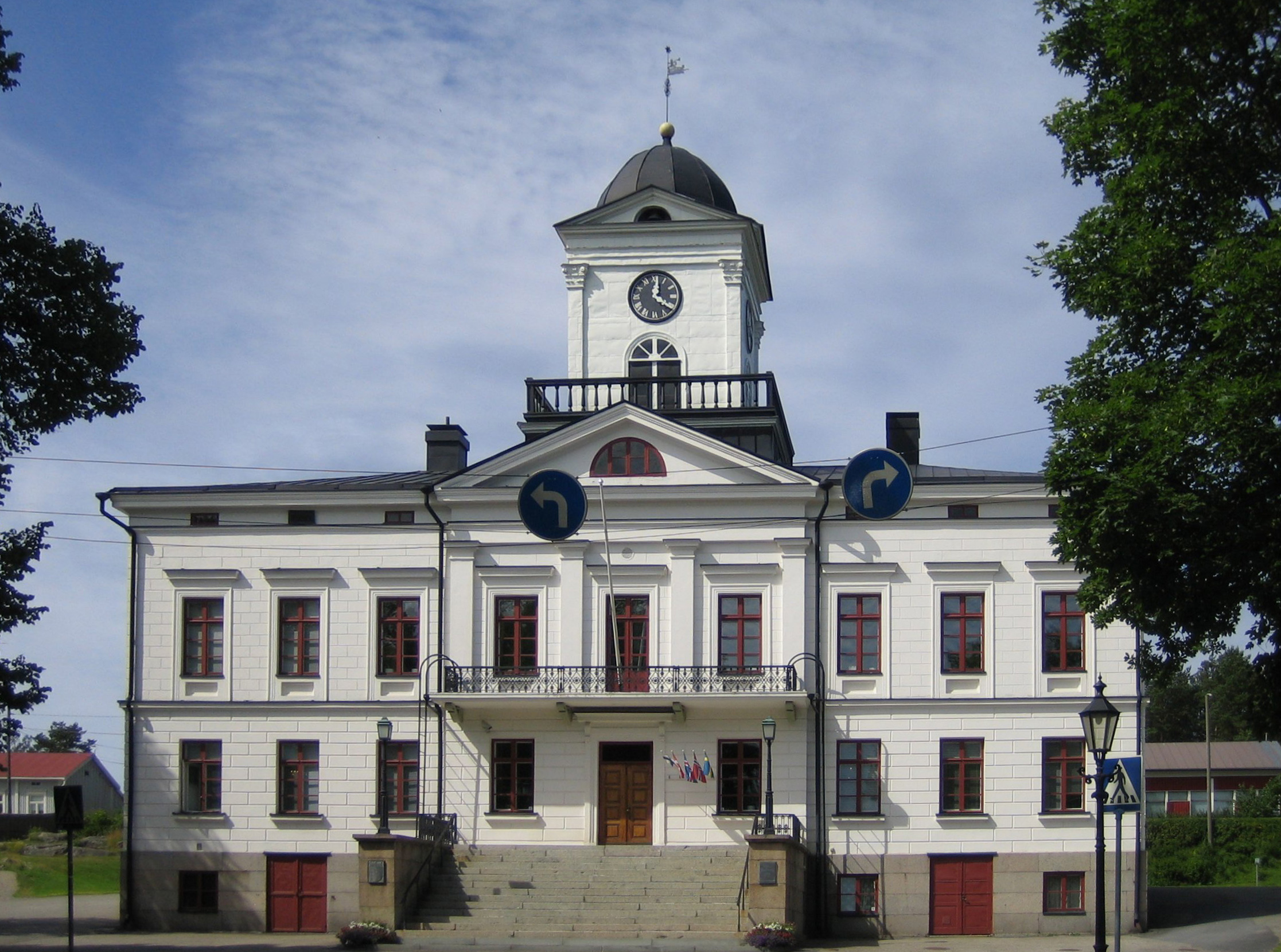
- City hall in 2018
- Interactive map of the Kristinestad city hall area

General information
- Type: Public
- Architectural style: Neoclassical
- Location: Kristinestad, Finland
- Coordinates: 62.2744°N 21.3733°E
- Current tenants: City of Kristinestad
- Completed: 1865

Technical details
- Material: Masonry
- Floor count: 2 (above ground) + tower

Design and construction
- Architect: Ernst Lohrmann

Kristinestad City Hall (Swedish: Kristinestads rådhus, Finnish: Kristiinankaupungin raatihuone) is the municipal headquarters building of Kristinestad (Kristiinankaupunki) on the west coast of Finland. The present city hall is the fourth in Kristinestad.

The building was designed in the neoclassical style by a leading architect of public buildings in the mid-19th century Finland, Ernst Lohrmann, and completed in 1865. It is of masonry construction, and comprises two storeys with a central clock tower.
