= Pielisjoki Castle =

Public building in Joensuu, Finland

- Pielisjoen linna
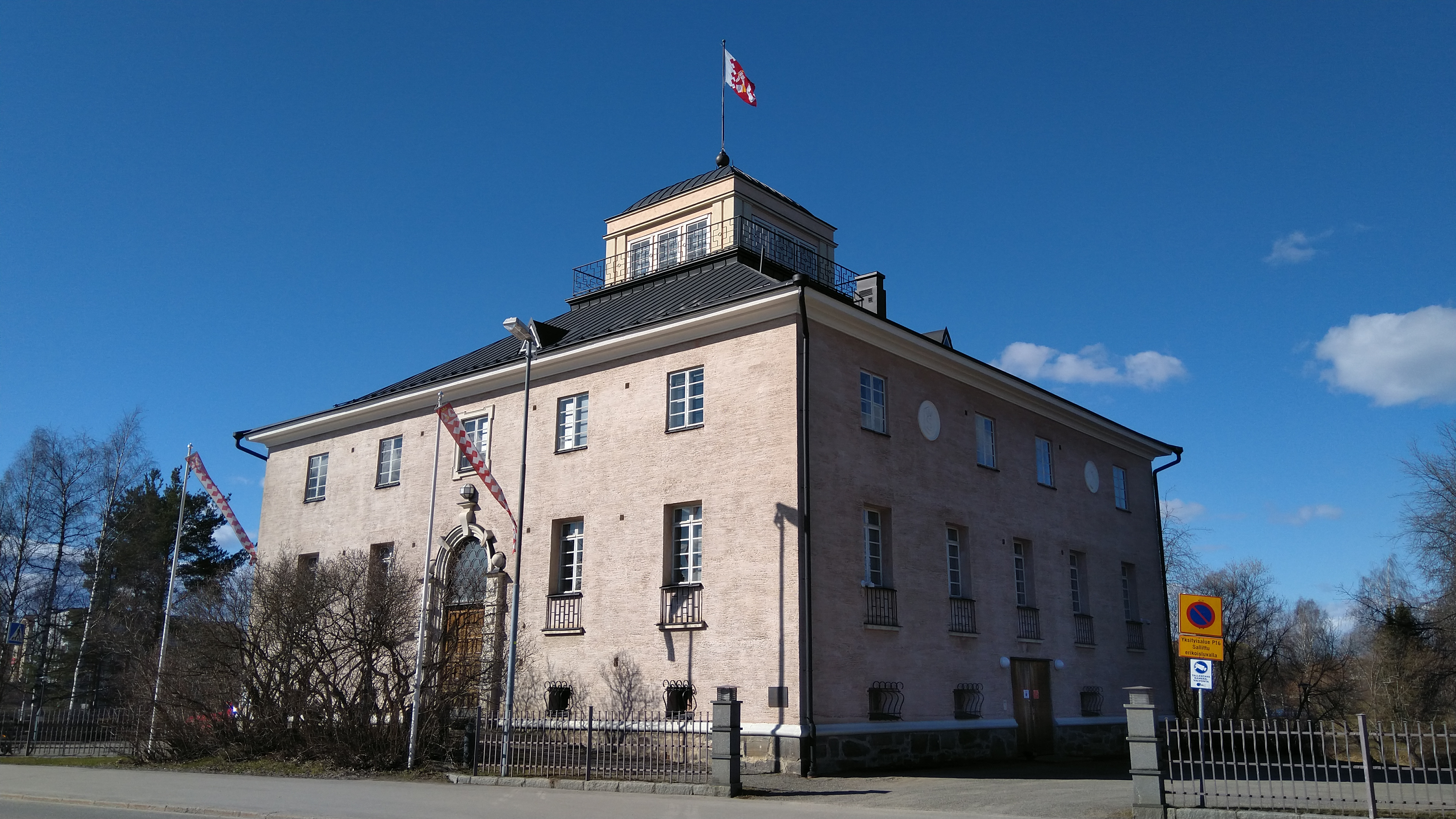
- Pielisjoki Castle in 2021
- Interactive map of the Pielisjoki Castle area

General information
- Architectural style: Neoclassical
- Location: Joensuu, Finland
- Coordinates: 62.6001°N 29.7710°E
- Current tenants: Pohjois-Karjalan Maakuntaliitto
- Completed: 1852
- Renovated: c. 1970, 1992-1993, 2018
- Owner: City of Joensuu (since 2001)

Technical details
- Material: Masonry
- Floor count: 3 (above ground) + observatory tower
- Floor area: c. 1,500 square metres (16,000 sq ft)

Design and construction
- Architect: Ernst Lohrmann

Pielisjoki Castle (Finnish: Pielisjoen linna) is a 19th-century public building in the city of Joensuu, in eastern Finland. It is located in the city centre, situated on a small island in River Pielisjoki. Built in 1852 originally as a Crown granary, the building was designed by a leading architect of public buildings of the time, Ernst Lohrmann, in the neoclassical style.

Despite its name the building has never served as a castle as such; after it ceased to operate as a granary, it was given over to the Suojeluskunta civil guard and converted in 1919 to office and residential use, according to the designs by the architect Ole Gripenberg. The ground floor housed staff quarters, arsenal and a drive-through carriageway for loading and offloading vehicles. The first floor comprised offices, with the commander's residence on the top floor.

After the Suojeluskunta organisation was dismantled, the building was occupied by the military. Following a renovation in the late 1960s, the building housed for over three decades various research units and activities of the University of Eastern Finland. Its current tenant is the North Karelian regional association Pohjois-Karjalan Maakuntaliitto.
