= Utsjoki Church =

Church in Utsjoki, Finland

Coordinates: 69.86361°N 27.00611°E

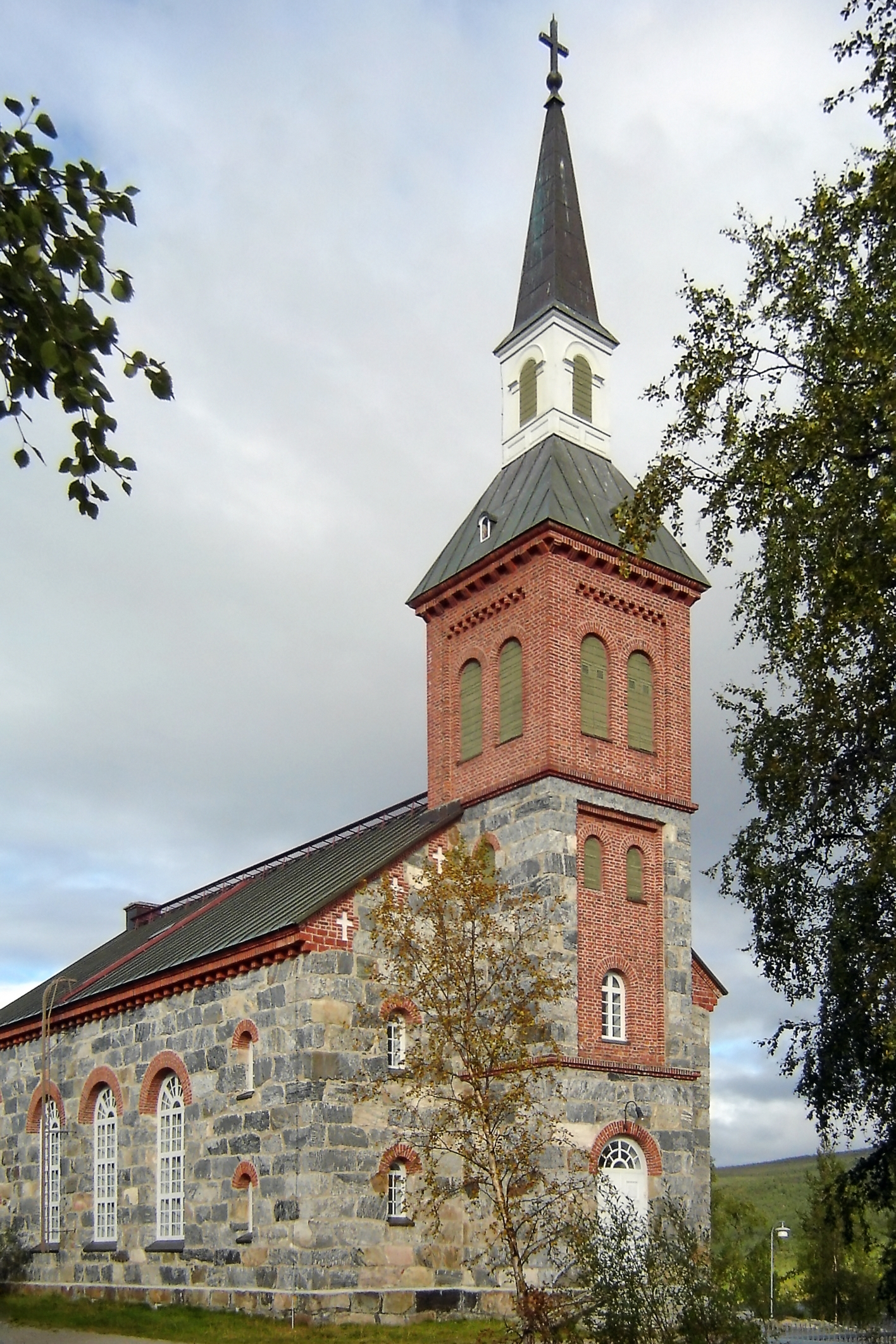
The church in 2007

Utsjoki Church is a church in the Lapland town of Utsjoki. It is the northernmost church in Finland as well as in the European Union. Belonging to the Evangelical Lutheran Church of Finland, it was designed by the architecture office of Ernst Lohrmann and was built with grey stones during the years 1850–1853. The small church seats 230 people within its 170 square metres.
