= Vegesack family =

Swedish noble family

von Vegesack
- Noble family
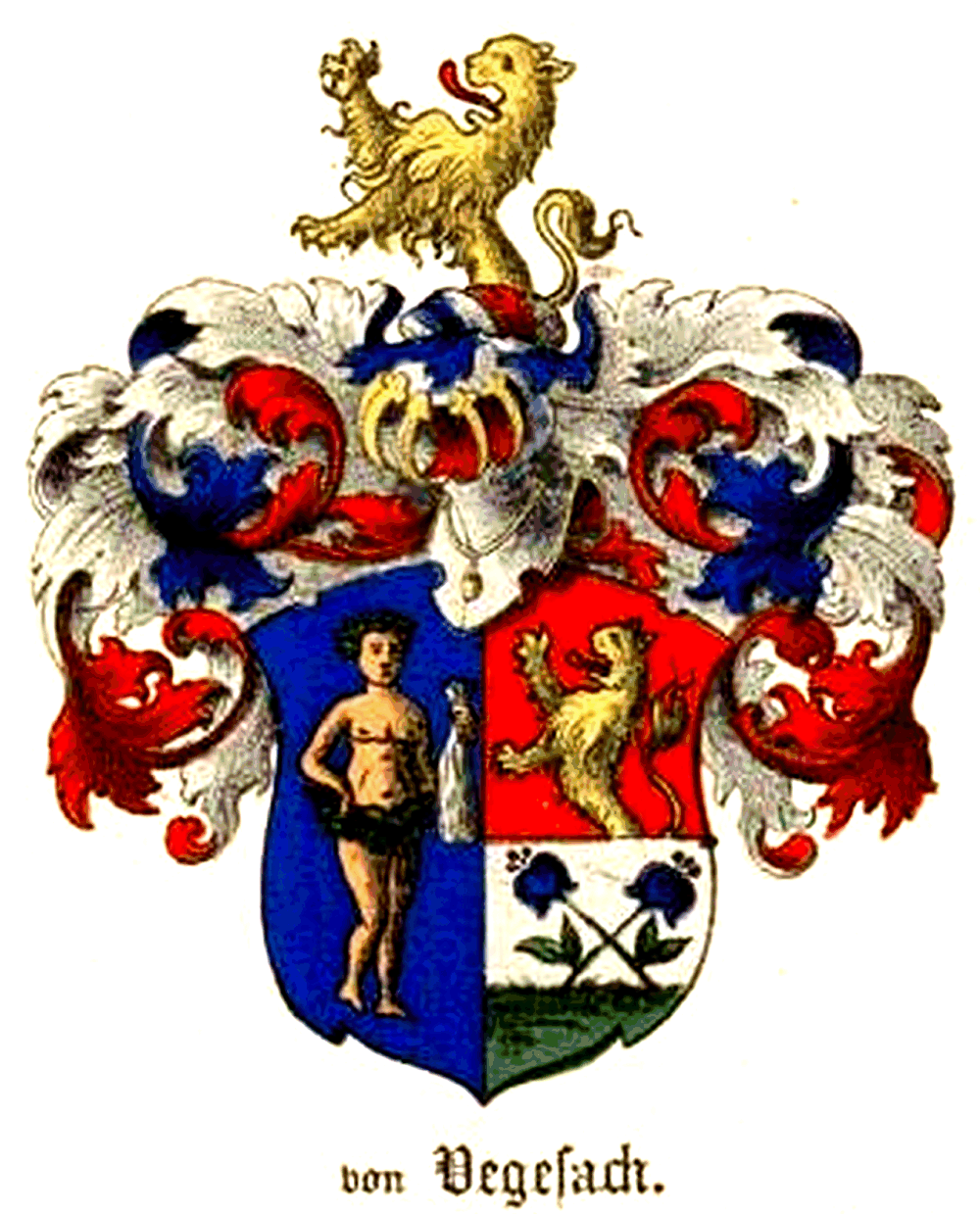
- Coat of arms of the House of von Düben
- Country: Northern Europe (Germany, Sweden)
- Origin: Germany
- Titles: Freiherr

The Vegesack family or von Vegesack (Latvian: Fēgezaks, Russian: Вегесак) is a Baltic German noble family of German origin, with presence in several European countries, and introduced at the Swedish house of nobility, and Livonian Knighthood.

== Notable members ==
- Eberhard von Vegesack
- Ernst von Vegesack
- Johan Fredrik Ernst von Vegesack
