= Kristinestad =

Town in Ostrobothnia, Finland

Kristinestad Kristinestad – Kristiinankaupunki
- Town
- Kristinestads stad Kristiinankaupungin kaupunki
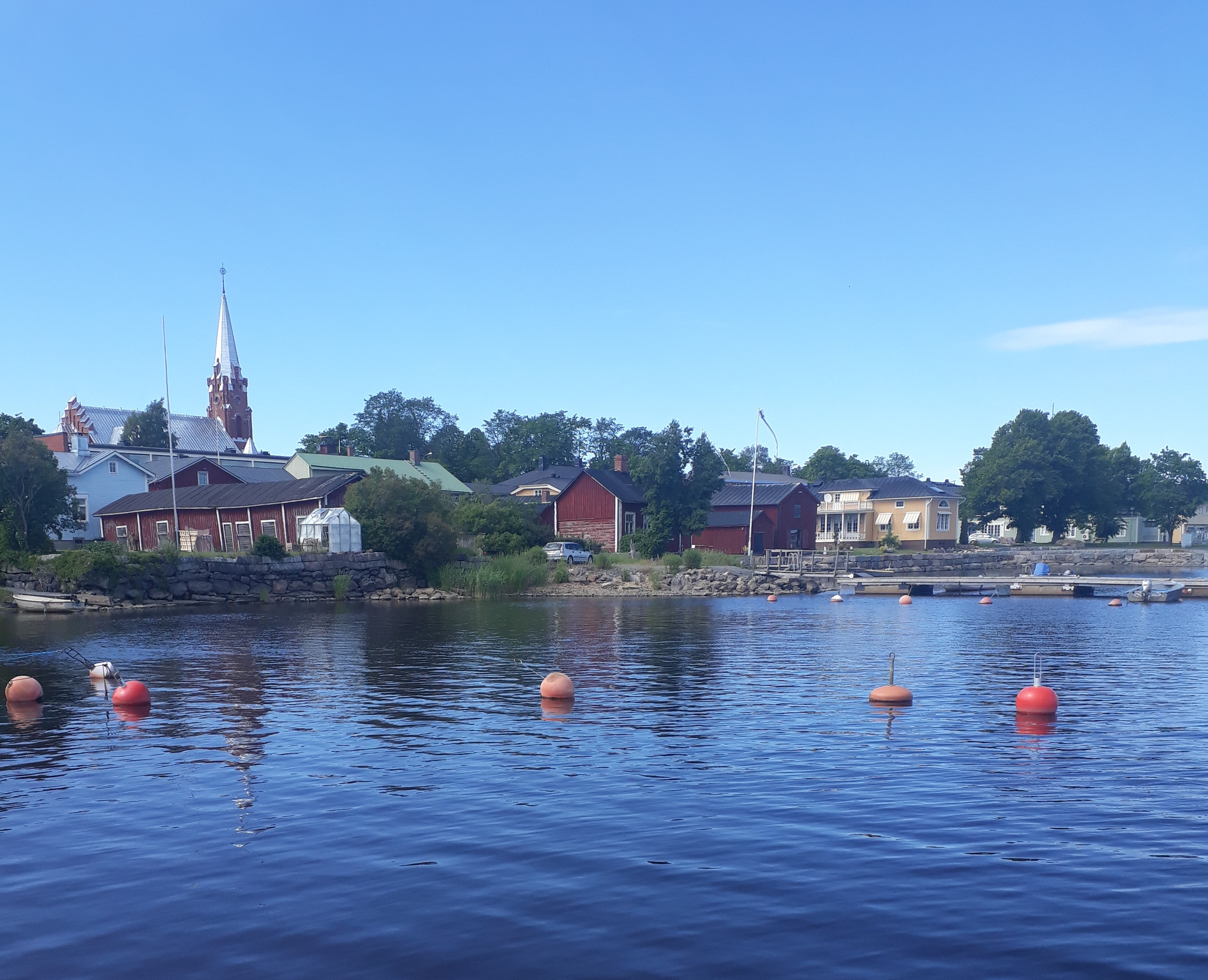
- Kristinestad in 2019

- Coat of arms

- Location of Kristinestad in Finland
- Interactive map of Kristinestad
- Coordinates: 62°16′N 021°21′E
- Country: Finland
- Region: Ostrobothnia
- Sub-region: Sydösterbotten
- Founded: 1649
- Named for: Christina of Sweden

Government
  - Town manager: Mila Segervall

Area (2018-01-01)
  - Total: 1,678.98 km^{2} (648.26 sq mi)
  - Land: 683.25 km^{2} (263.80 sq mi)
  - Water: 996.45 km^{2} (384.73 sq mi)
  - Rank: 124th largest in Finland

Population (2025-12-31)
  - Total: 6,113
  - Rank: 153rd largest in Finland
  - Density: 8.95/km^{2} (23.2/sq mi)

Population by native language
  - Swedish: 51.9% (official)
  - Finnish: 39.5% (official)
  - Others: 8.6%

Population by age
  - 0 to 14: 11.9%
  - 15 to 64: 51.4%
  - 65 or older: 36.7%
- Time zone: UTC+02:00 (EET)
  - Summer (DST): UTC+03:00 (EEST)
- Website: www.kristinestad.fi

Kristinestad (Finland Swedish: [krisˈtiːneˌstɑːd]; Finnish: Kristiinankaupunki [ˈkristiːnɑŋˌkɑu̯puŋki]; Latin: Christinea; lit. 'Christine Town') is a town in Finland, located on the west coast of the country. Kristinestad is situated in Ostrobothnia, along the Gulf of Bothnia. The population of Kristinestad is approximately 6,000, while the sub-region has a population of approximately 17,000. It is the 153rd most populous municipality in Finland.

Kristinestad is located in the western part of Finland on the shore of the Bothnian Sea. Kristinestad covers an area of 683.25 km^{2} (263.80 sq mi) (excluding sea areas) of which 14.66 km^{2} (5.66 sq mi) is inland water. The population density is 8.95/km^{2} (23.2/sq mi).

Kristinestad is a bilingual municipality with Finnish and Swedish as its official languages. The population consists of 39% Finnish speakers, 52% Swedish speakers, and 9% speakers of other languages.

The Finnish name "Kristiinankaupunki" is the longest municipality name currently in use in Finland. In the vernacular, locally and on some maps, the town itself is known only as "Kristiina".

== History ==
The town was chartered in 1649 by Per Brahe the Younger at Koppö island and is named for Queen Christina of Sweden. Kristinestad is known for its old town with low wooden houses and narrow alleys. In April, 2011, Kristinestad became Finland's first Cittaslow community.

== Geography ==
=== Climate ===
Kristinestad has a continental subarctic climate (Dfc).

Climate data for Kristinestad
Month	Jan	Feb	Mar	Apr	May	Jun	Jul	Aug	Sep	Oct	Nov	Dec	Year
Daily mean °C (°F)	−8 (18)	−7.8 (18.0)	−3.7 (25.3)	1.9 (35.4)	9 (48)	14 (57)	15.7 (60.3)	13.8 (56.8)	8.8 (47.8)	4.0 (39.2)	−1.3 (29.7)	−5.6 (21.9)	3.4 (38.1)
Average precipitation days	10	8	9	8	7	8	11	11	11	11	11	11	116
Source: http://www.yr.no/place/Finland/Western_Finland/Kristinestad~650770/statistics.html

== International relations ==
=== Twin towns — Sister cities ===
Kristinestad is twinned with:

- Sala, Sweden
- Novello, Italy

== Gallery ==
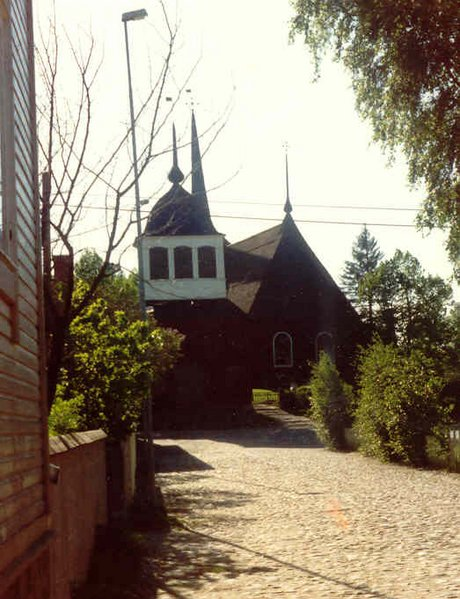
Ulrica Eleonora church in central Kristinestad.

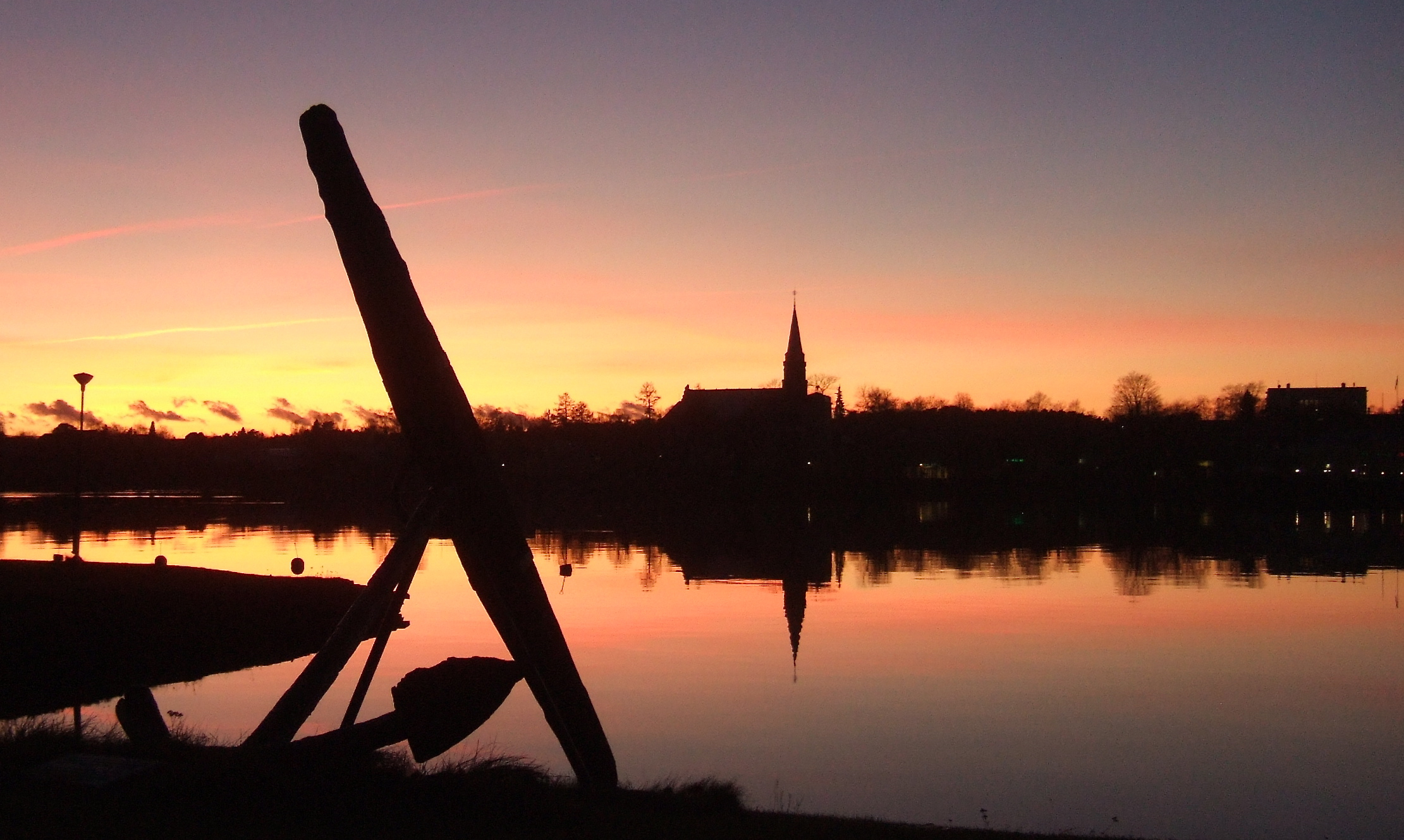
During twilight over the town bay and the silhouette.

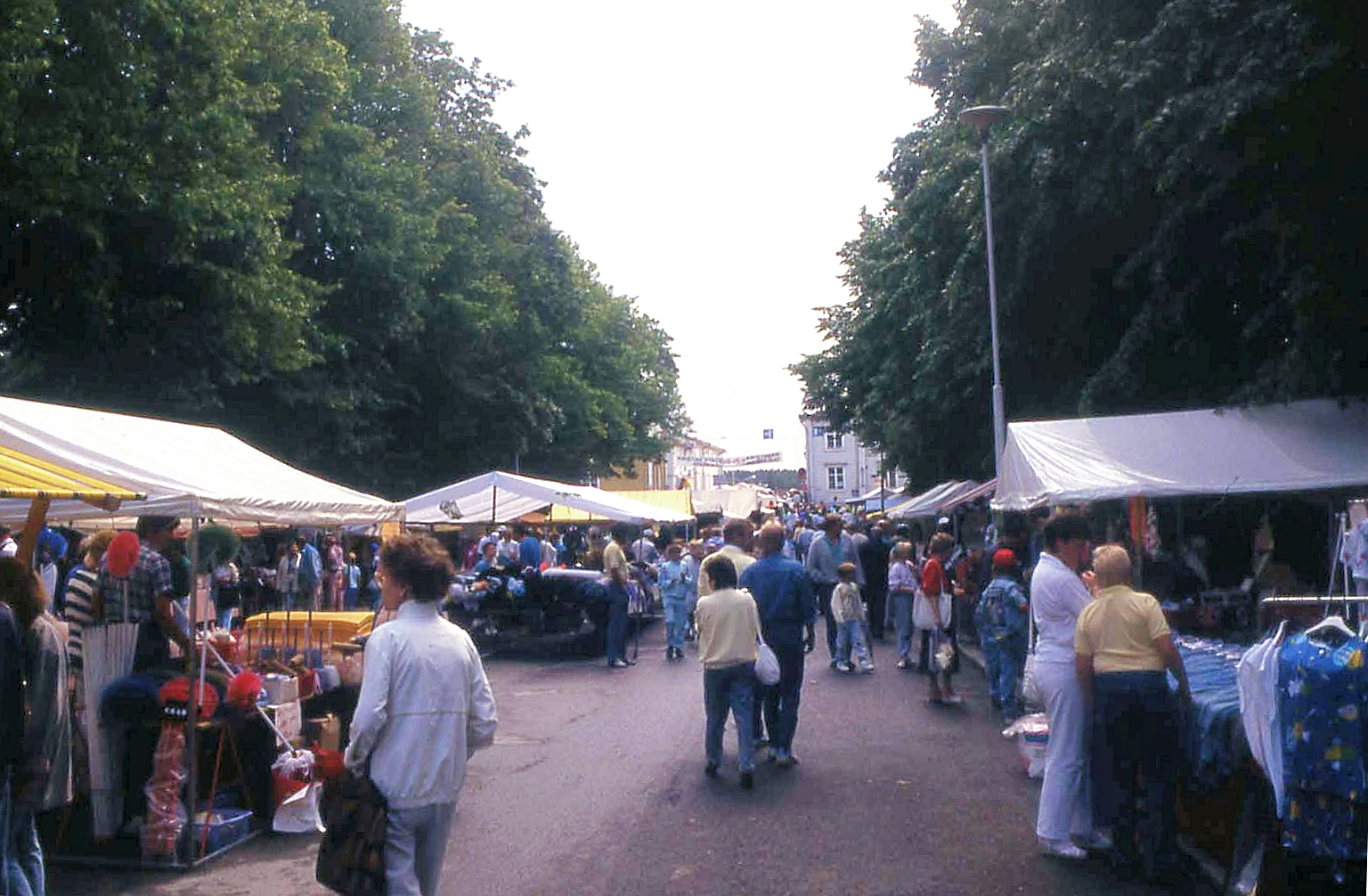
Summer market of Kristinestad in 1989.

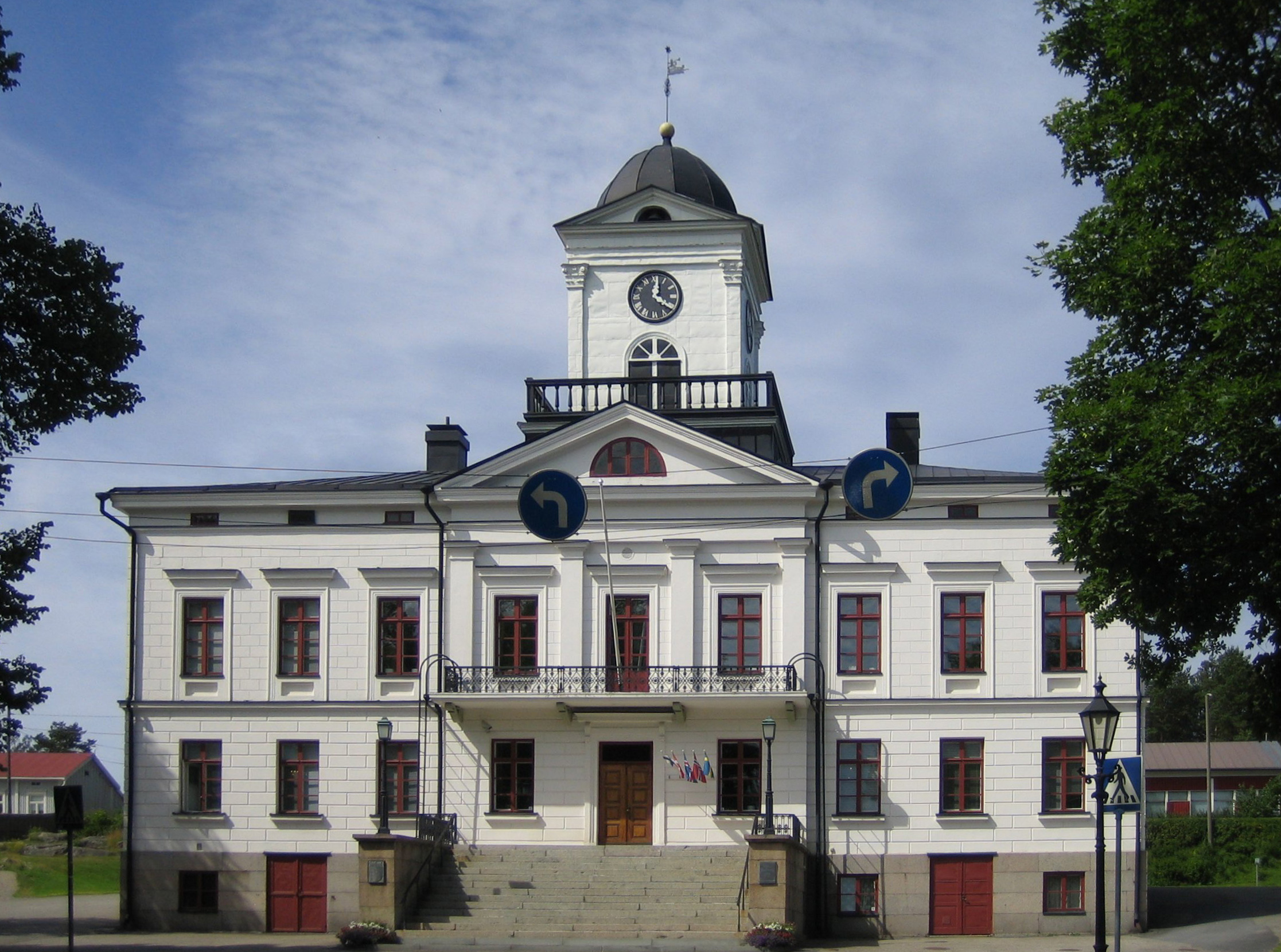
City Hall (1865)

== See also ==
- Jakobstad
- Kaskinen
- Lappfjärd
