= Ernst Lohrmann =

19th-century German-Finnish architect

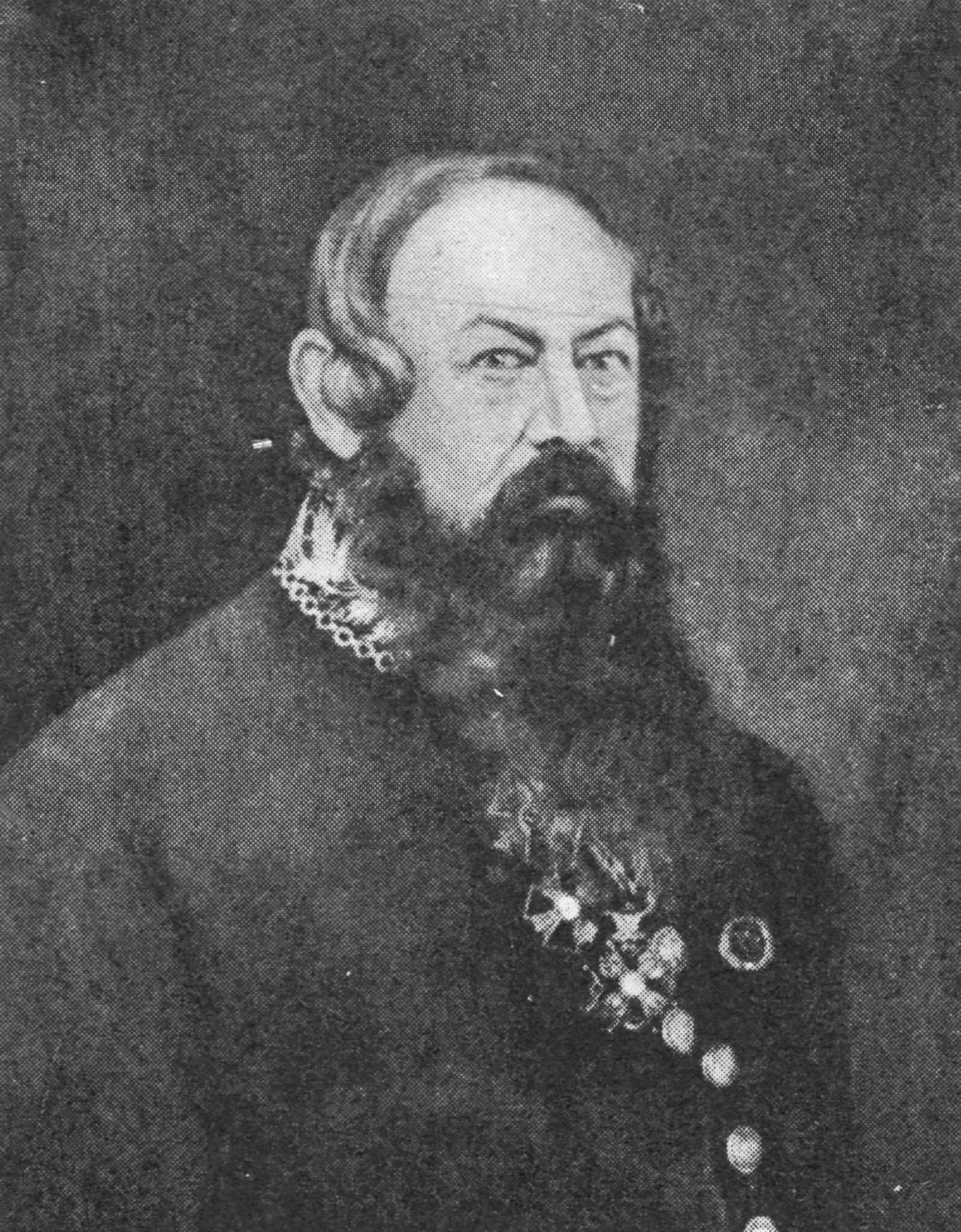
- Born: 30 June 1803; Übelgonne, nr. Paderborn, Duchy of Westphalia
- Died: 17 June 1870 (aged 66); Stockholm, Sweden
- Education: University of Göttingen
- Occupation: Architect

Ernst Bernhard Lohrmann (30 June 1803 — 17 June 1870) was a German-Finnish architect born and educated in Germany but practising mainly in the Grand Duchy of Finland, where he is known especially as a designer of public buildings and more than 20 churches, many in the late Empire and Gothic Revival styles.

Lohrmann also held the position of Intendant of the National Board of Public Building, following the death in 1840 of his predecessor and compatriot Carl Ludvig Engel. In that role, Lohrmann is credited with considerably developing and systematising the Board's operations, as well as seeing through to completion many of Engel's unfinished designs.

== Biography ==
=== Education and early career ===
Lohrmann came from a landowning family and studied at the Bauakademie in Berlin, the leading architecture academy of the time. He graduated as a surveyor in 1827 and as an architect in 1836, which qualified him as an inspector of civil engineering. Before coming to Finland, he led an extensive new construction program for the Berlin Hospital Administration. His surviving works in Berlin include the main building of the Veterinary School (1840) on Luisenstrasse, a representative example of the so-called Schinkelian Classicist school of architecture.

He married Caroline Julie Stagge around 1838.

=== Head of the Intendant's Office ===
After the death of Carl Ludvig Engel in 1840, the emperor sought a successor within the Prussian architectural profession. The Russian envoy in Berlin, Peter von Meyendorff, handled the recruitment, and Lohrmann was appointed head of the Intendant's Office in 1841. The appointment guaranteed continued leadership at a high architectural level in the country, and in the period immediately following Engel he was the only architect in Finland with an education that fully corresponded to the tasks at hand.

Lohrmann's arrival brought about a stylistic change in Finnish architecture. Engel's era had been characterized by Palladian neoclassicism, but Lohrmann introduced new trends, including the round-arch style and neo-Gothic. The new church in Hattula, designed in 1851, was one of the first neo-Gothic sanctuaries in Finland built in red brick. In Helsinki, his ecclesiastical brick Gothic is represented by St. Henry's Cathedral, built in the latter half of the 1850s. In total, Lohrmann designed 64 new churches and belfries and, according to his own account, completed more than two hundred other building projects.

One of Lohrmann's most important contributions was the introduction of county architectural offices in 1848. The Senate had preferred to use the engineering officers of the State of Roads and Waterworks as regional representatives, but Lohrmann argued that the tasks necessarily required architectural training. Governor-General Alexander Sergeyevich Menshikov sided with Lohrmann, and special county architectural offices were established. Among those recruited were the Swedes G. T. Chiewitz and C. A. Setterberg, who became county architects in Turku and Vaasa, respectively. The system laid the foundation for regional architectural development as a counterbalance to central control from Helsinki.

Lohrmann also significantly increased the number of student places at the superintendent's office and actively worked to strengthen the domestic architectural corps. The most talented among the students – Carl Albert Edelfelt, Axel Hampus Dalström and Ludvig Isak Lindqvist – came in turn to lead the office. In the latter half of the 1850s, Lohrmann also began to require that applicants for the director's office be native Finns, in order to benefit his own students.

Lohrmann was also a member of building committees and of the committees that drew up the general building regulations of the cities and investigated the construction of the Saimaa Canal. He co-founded the Finnish Art Society (Finnish: Suomen Taideyhdistys) in 1846 and the German Assembly in 1858.

=== Later years ===
In 1865, the director's office was reorganized into the General Board of Public Buildings (Rakennushallitus, Finnish government agency that operated from 1811 to 1995), a result of a preparation that had already begun at Lohrmann's initiative in the late 1840s. He served briefly as the first director-general before being dismissed with the rank of cabinet minister in 1867 and moving with his family to Stockholm, where he died in 1870.

When he left, Lohrmann took with him hundreds of building drawings that were not part of the official archives of the superintendent's office, including a significant number of drawings by Engel. After his death, the collection fell into oblivion until it was accidentally rediscovered on Värmdö in the Stockholm archipelago in 1963. The discoverers, Lohrmann's granddaughter's daughter Gun Åkerfeldt (born Wibom) and her husband, the court superintendent Ivar Åkerfeldt, donated the architecturally important collection to the Finnish state in 1966.

== Buildings designed by Lohrmann ==
Notable examples include:

- St. Henry's Cathedral, Helsinki
- Mint of Finland, Helsinki
- Kuopio Governor Palace (original plans, not built)
- Utsjoki Church
- Ruokolahti Church
- Söderskär Lighthouse, Porvoo
- Old Turku Prison ('Kakola')
- Villa Hakasalmi, Helsinki
- Kristinestad City Hall
- Pielisjoki Castle, Joensuu
