= Eberhard von Vegesack =

Swedish Army Commander

Major general Count Eberhard von Vegesack
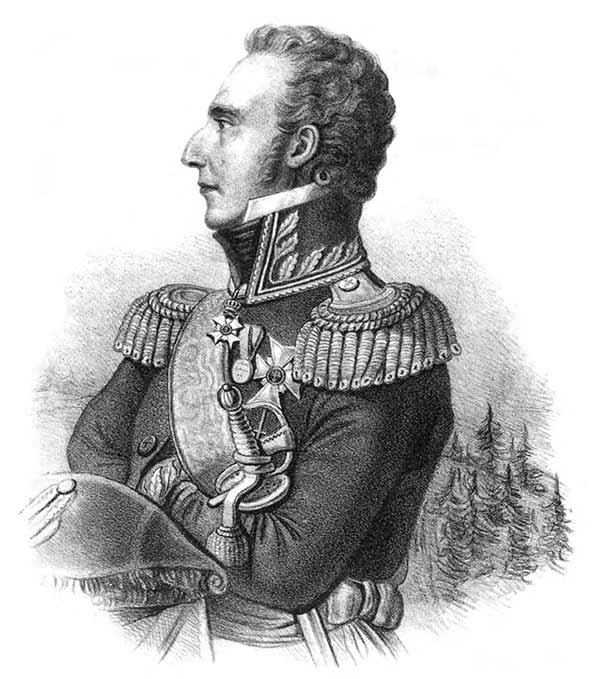
- Litograph of von Vegesack by Alexander Wetterling
- Born: Eberhard Ernst Gotthard von Vegesack; 29 March 1763; Rostock, Mecklenburg-Schwerin
- Died: 30 October 1818 (aged 54); Stockholm, Sweden
- Burial place: Klara Church
- Military career
- Allegiance: Sweden
- Branch: Swedish Army
- Service years: 1784–1818
- Rank: Major general
- Unit: Svea Artillery Regiment
- Conflicts: Russo-Swedish War (1788–1790); Pomeranian War; Great Sortie of Stralsund; Dano-Swedish War (1808–1809); Finnish War; Battle of Lemo; Battle of Lappfjärd; Battle of Oravais; War of the Sixth Coalition; Swedish–Norwegian War; Battle of Rakkestad; Battle of Langnes

Eberhard Ernst Gotthard von Vegesack (29 March 1763 – 30 October 1818) was a German-born officer in the Swedish Army who was active from the Russo-Swedish War to the Swedish–Norwegian War. By birth, he was member of the Vegesack family of Baltic German origin.
