= 1808 in Russia =

Events from the year 1808 in Russia

== Incumbents ==
- Monarch – Alexander I

== Events ==
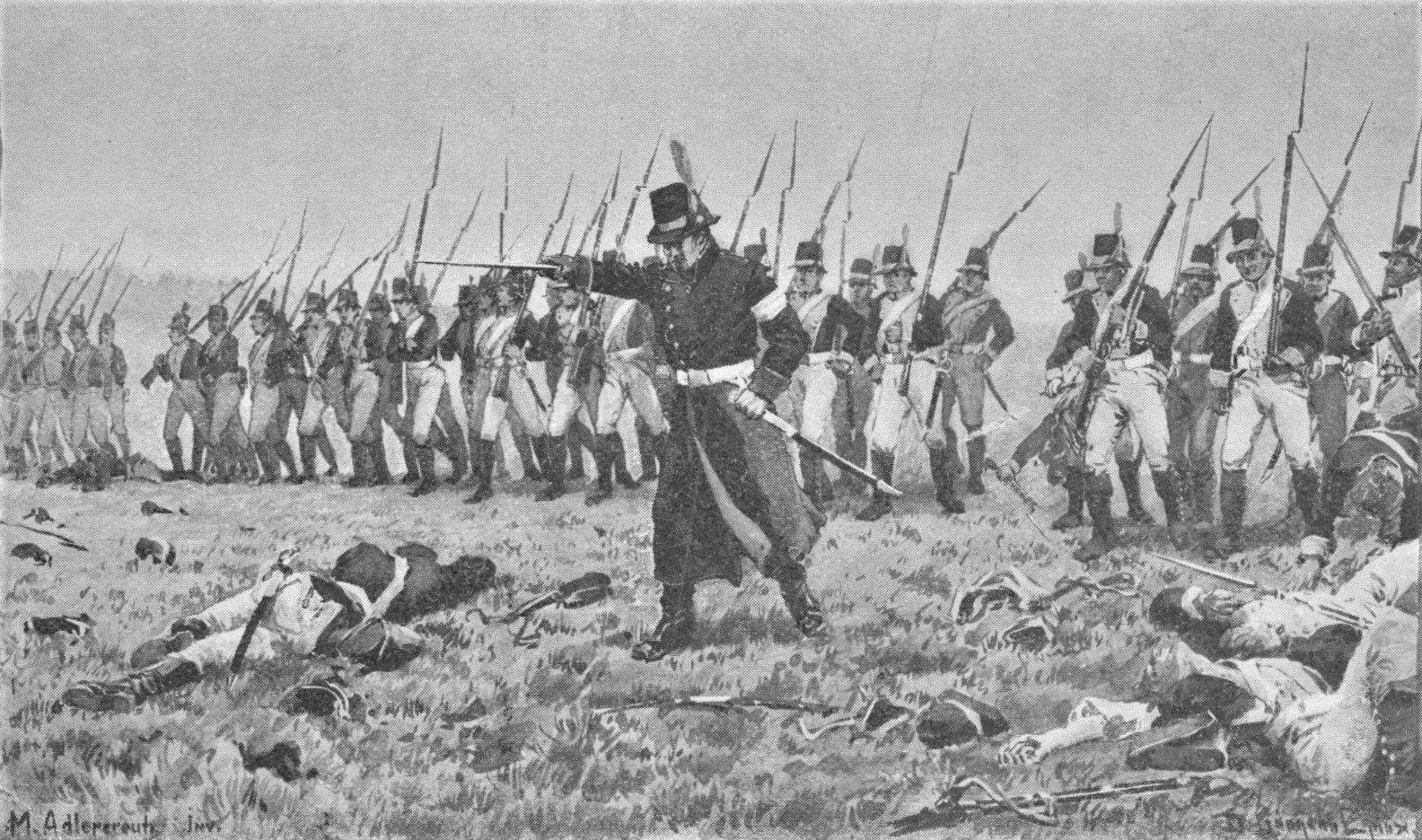
"The last attack of the Swedes" by Magnus Adlercreutz (Battle of Oravais)

- Russo-Persian War (1804–1813)
  - Siege of Erivan (1808)
- Russo-Turkish War (1806–1812)
- Anglo-Russian War (1807–1812)
  - June 23: Battle of the Nargö
- Finnish War (1808-1809)
  - March 14 - May 3: Siege of Sveaborg
  - April 16: Battle of Pyhäjoki
  - April 18: Battle of Siikajoki
  - April 22 - May 18: Russian occupation of Gotland
  - April 27: Battle of Revolax
  - May 2: Battle of Pulkkila
  - May 9 or 10: Battle of Kumlinge
  - May 12: Battle of Kuopio
  - June 19–20: Battle of Lemo
  - June 24: Battle of Nykarleby
  - June 25–26: Battle of Vaasa
  - June 30-July 2: Battle of Rimito Kramp
  - July 3: Battle of Lintulaks
  - July 11: Battle of Kokonsaari
  - July 14: Battle of Lapua
  - July 31: Battle of Mönninvaara
  - August 2–3: Battle of Sandöström
  - August 10: Battle of Pälkjärvi
  - August 10: Battle of Kauhajoki
  - August 17: Battle of Alavus
  - August 21: Battle of Karstula
  - August 28: Battle of Nummijärvi
  - August 29: Battle of Lappfjärd
  - August 30: Battle of Grönvikssund
  - September 1–2: Battle of Ruona–Salmi
  - September 13: Battle of Jutas
  - September 14–15: Battle of Oravais
  - September 17–18: Battle of Lokalaks
  - September 18: Battle of Palva Sund
  - September 26–28: Helsinki village landing
  - October 27: Battle of Koljonvirta
- September 27 - October 14: Congress of Erfurt
- Construction of Fort Constantin begins
- The Russian Messenger magazine begins publication

== Births ==
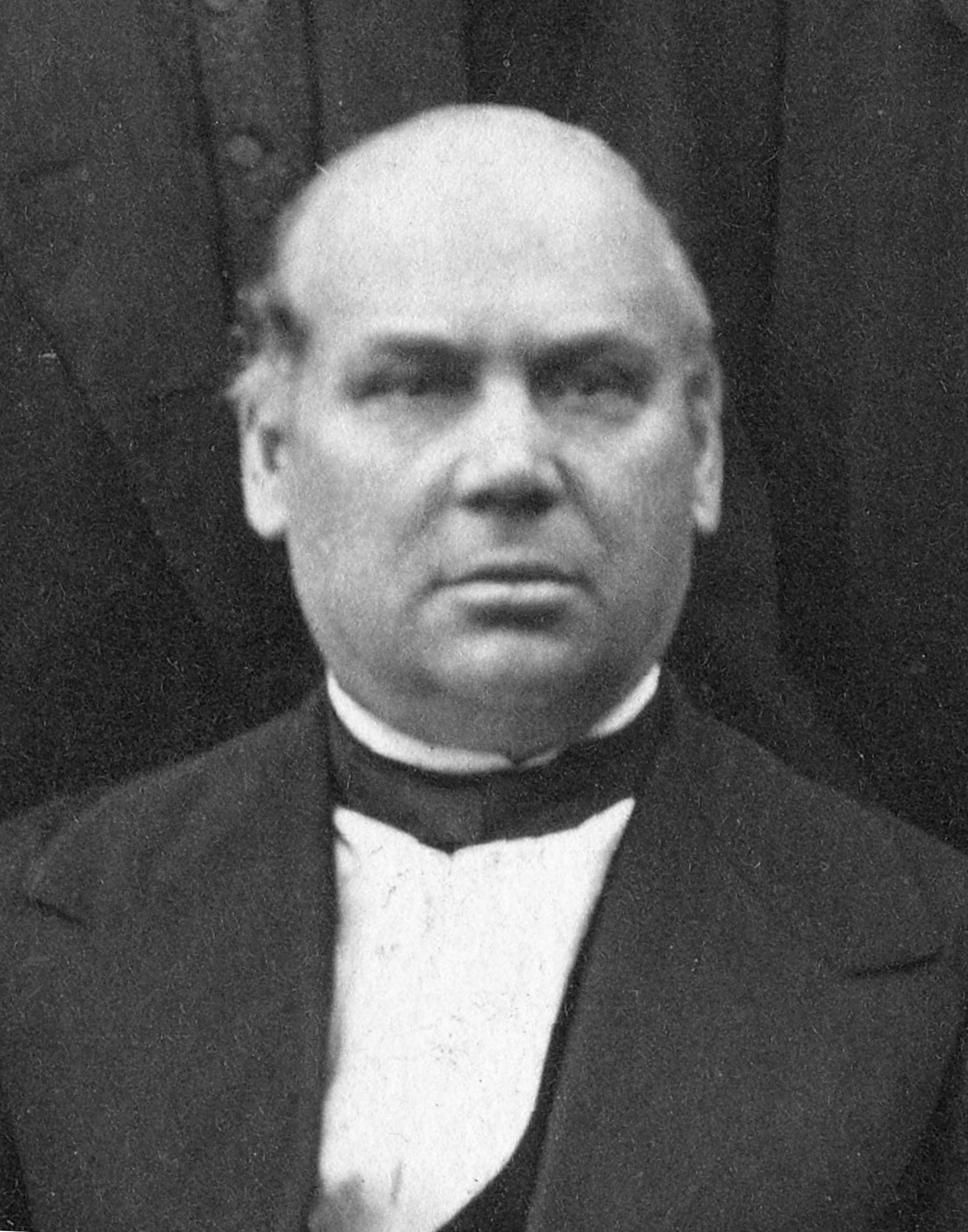
Aleksandr Voskresensky (1868)

- Karl Eduard Aeschlimann, Swiss-born architect (d. 1893)
- Osip Bodyansky, Slavist of Ukrainian Cossack descent (d. 1877)
- Pyotr Chikhachyov, naturalist and geologist (d. 1890)
- Natan Friedland, rabbi, preacher, writer, proto-Zionist (d. 1883)
- Aleksey Gornostayev, architect (d. 1862)
- Aurora Karamzin, Finnish lady-in-waiting and philanthropist (d. 1902)
- Pyotr Kireevsky, folklorist and philologist (d. 1856)
- Elim Meshchersky, diplomat, poet, and translator (d. 1844)
- Anna Olenina, noblewoman and writer (d. 1888)
- Manana Orbeliani, Georgian noblewoman and salonist (d. 1870)
- Yehuda Leib Schneersohn, Ukrainian Habad Hasidic rabbi (d. 1866)
- Apollon Skalkowski, Polish-Russian historian and writer (d. 1898)
- Grigory Skariatin, general (d. 1849)
- Yitzchok Sternhartz, Ukrainian Hasidic Jew (d. 1871)
- Alexander Sulkhanishvili, Georgian calligrapher, translator, and lexicographer (d. ?)
- Alexey Tyranov, painter (d. 1859)
- Khasay Khan Utsmiyev, Kumyk general (d. 1867)
- Aleksandr Voskresensky, chemist (d. 1880)
- Lavrenty Zagoskin, naval officer and explorer (d. 1890)

== Deaths ==
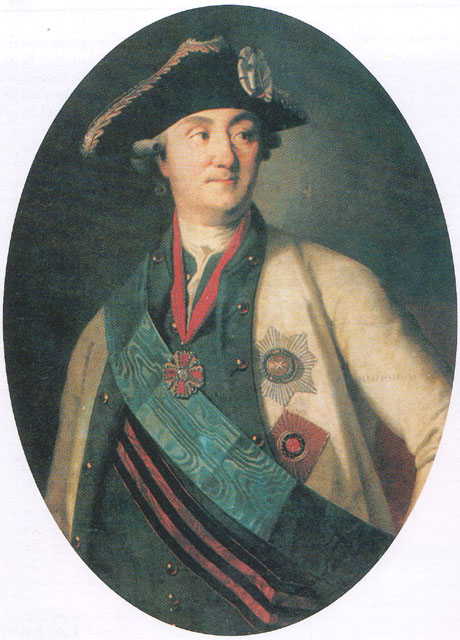
Alexei Orlov in 1779

- Alexander Bekleshov, general, government official, Prosecutor general (b. 1743)
- Apollon Dashkov, general, Governor of Taganrog (b. 1753)
- Mikhail Petrovich Dolgorukov, general killed at Battle of Koljonvirta (b. 1780)
- Grand Duchess Elizabeth Alexandrovna of Russia, daughter of Alexander I, died young (b. 1806)
- Alexei Grigoryevich Orlov, general-in-chief, admiral, and statesman (b. 1737)
- Fyodor Rokotov, portrait painter (b. 1736)
- Ivan Starov, architect (b. 1745)
- Artemy Vedel, Ukrainian composer of military and liturgical music (b. 1767)
