= Timeline of the Finnish War =

This is a timeline of battles and other events of the Finnish War (1808–1809). The dates are according to the Gregorian (Western European) calendar. Russian sources might refer to Julian calendar dates.

Date	Event	Location	Coordinates
February 21, 1808 (c. 5:00 a.m)	Russian army crosses the border to Finland	Kymi river, border river, near Hamina.	?
March/April, 1808	Russian army	Kuopio, Tampere, Jakobstad	?
March/April, 1808	Russian navy	Gotland, Åland	?
March 18, 1808	The Russian army conquers the Fortress of Svartholm	Loviisa	?
March 21, 1808	The Russian army conquers the Hanko Peninsula		?
March 22, 1808	The Russian army conquers Turku		?
April 6, 1808	Cronstedt, who is the commander of the Fortress of Sveaborg, negotiates with the Russian army		?
April 16, 1808	Battle of Pyhäjoki	Pyhäjoki	?
April 18, 1808	Battle of Siikajoki		?
April 27, 1808	Battle of Revolax		?
May 2, 1808	Battle of Pulkkila		?
May 3, 1808	Siege of Sveaborg	Sveaborg (Suomenlinna), Helsinki	?
May 9, 1808	Battle of Kumlinge		?
June 19–20, 1808	Battle of Lemo		?
June, 1808	Alexander I calls for elections and invites Finnish representatives to gather in Saint Petersburg. The deputies are led by Carl Erik Mannerheim.		?
June 24, 1808	Battle of Nykarleby	Nykarleby	?
June 25, 1808	Battle of Vaasa	Vaasa	?
June 30, 1808	Battle of Rimito Kramp		?
July 11, 1808	Battle of Kokonsaari		?
July 14, 1808	Battle of Lapua		?
August 2–3, 1808	Battle of Sandöström		?
August 10, 1808	Battle of Kauhajoki		?
August 17, 1808	Battle of Alavus		?
August 21, 1808	Battle of Karstula	Karstula	?
August 28, 1808	Battle of Lappfjärd		?
August 30, 1808	Battle of Grönvikssund		?
September 1, 1808	Battle of Ruona		?
	Battle of Ruona and Salmi		?
September 2, 1808	Battle of Salmi (same as above?)		?
September 6, 1808	Battle of Ömossa	Ömossa	?
September 13, 1808	Battle of Jutas	Nykarleby	?
September 14, 1808	Battle of Oravais	Oravais	?
September 18, 1808	Battle of Palva Sund		?
September 29, 1808	Truce of Lohteå		?
October 27, 1808	Battle of Koljonvirta		?
November 10, 1808	The Moonlight Raid		?
November 19, 1808	Convention of Olkijoki: the Finnish army retreats north of the Kemi River		?
March 21, 1809	Convention of Åland		?
March 25, 1809	Convention of Seivis/Kalix, after Russian navy raids in Gulf of Bothnia		?
March 25-July 19, 1809	Diet of Porvoo		?
May 15, 1809	Encounter at Skellefteå		?
July 5–6, 1809	Battle of Hörnefors		?
August 19, 1809	Battle of Sävar		?
August 20, 1809	Battle of Ratan		?
August 25, 1809	Battle of Piteå	Piteå	?
September 2, 1809	Truce of Frostkåge gästgivargård		?
September 17, 1809	Treaty of Fredrikshamn		?
