= I19 =

I19, I 19 or I-19 may refer to:

- Västerbotten Regiment, a Swedish infantry regiment; active from 1816 to 1841
- Norrbotten Regiment, a Swedish infantry regiment; active from 1841 to 1975, and since 2000
- Interstate 19, an Interstate highway in Arizona
- Japanese submarine I-19
