= Battle of Kokonsaari =

1808 battle of the Finnish War

- Part of the Finnish War
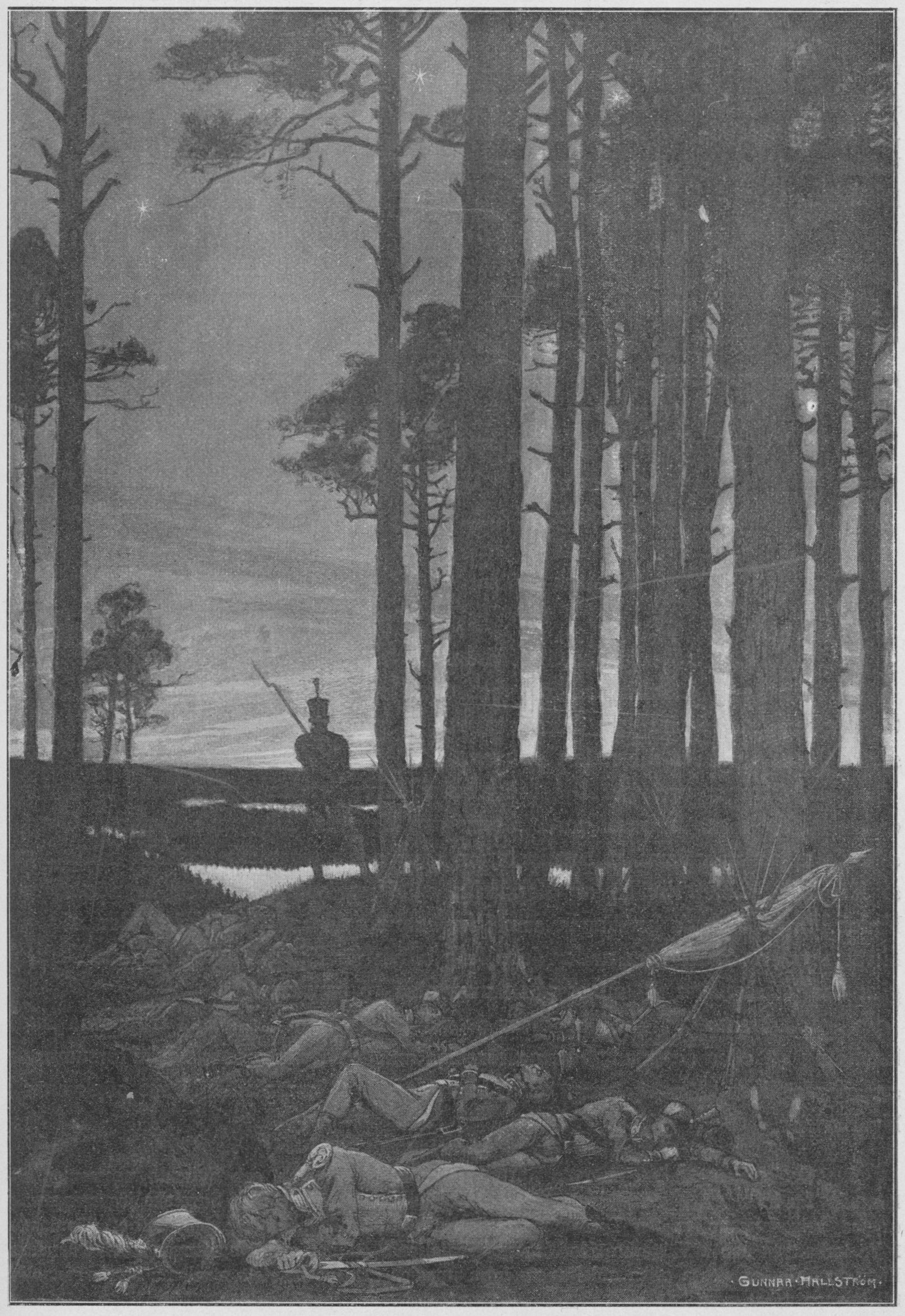
- Drömmen före Lapposlaget, by Gunnar Hallström
Date	11 July 1808
Location	Kokonsaari, Finland 63°12′N 24°24′E
Result	Russian victory

Belligerents
Sweden	Russian Empire

Commanders and leaders
Otto von Fieandt	(Russian Empire) General-major Yankovich

Strength
1,200; 4 guns	3,100; 4 guns

Casualties and losses
200–250 killed, wounded or captured	316 killed, wounded or captured
- Location within Finland Battle of Kokonsaari (European Russia)

The Battle of Kokonsaari was fought between Swedish and Russian forces at Kokonsaari in Finland on 11 July 1808 during the Finnish War.

== Background ==
After the Battle of Lintulaks the Swedish commander Otto von Fieandt received reinforcements from the Swedish Field-Marshal Wilhelm Mauritz Klingspor, which increased his forces to about 1,200 men with 4 guns to protect the highway leading to Kokkola. The Russians opposing him likewise saw their forces grow to the size of about 3,100. The Russians attacked the Swedes on July 11 and once again met them deployed in an overextended line — with gaps and no reserve — extending two kilometres crossed over the Kokkola highway, with their right flank protected by the Perho river. As in the previous battle, the Russians kept several battalions as reserve while still heavily outnumbering the Swedes in the attack.

=== Swedish forces ===
- Åbo Infantry Regiment (1 Battalion)
- Nyland Infantry Regiment (1 Battalion)
- Tavastehus Infantry Regiment (2 companies)
- Savolax Infantry Regiment (2 companies)
- Savolax Jäger Regiment (2 companies)
- Nyland Dragoon Regiment (20–50)
- Finnish Artillery Regiment (4 guns)

In total: 1,200 men and 4 guns

== Battle ==
The Swedes resisted stubbornly, the artillery on both sides duelled near the highway while the infantry fought intensely out on the bog; some Swedish battalions counterattacked and pushed several Russian lines back, until their reserve gave them enough weight to repulse the Swedish attack. Jankovitj then reinforced his right flank with two battalions from the reserve — to encircle the Swedish left and gain access to the highway from behind — while his other battalions increased their activity at the front; this forced Fieandt to withdraw one kilometre, where he once again made a brief stand at a forest edge to buy time for the collection of wounded, before he eventually ordered a retreat towards Tunkkarin Silta, five kilometres away. The skirmish at Kokonsaari had proved to be one of the more intensely fought engagements during the whole war. The Swedish casualty report mentioned 159 privates and seven officers killed or wounded, however, this number excludes missing (an additional killed and captured); it is therefore likely that the total casualties in dead and wounded reached a sixth of their fighting force, excluding the prisoners. The Russians had lost 16 officers and around 300 privates. The Swedish force had stood well up against the much larger Russian and their retreat had been executed in good order.

== Aftermath ==
As the Russian threat, towards Kokkola and the Swedish supply lines, became increasingly evident, Klingspor sent the entire sixth brigade (consisting of the remains of the Swedish force which had landed at Vaasa) to reinforce Fieandt. The Swedish main army, however, then defeated the Russians at the Battle of Lapua, at 14 July, which cut the Russian connection between Kuopio and Vaasa; but Klingspor failed to take advantage of the victory. The effects of the battle at Lapua led to a Russian withdrawal, and the return of the Swedish sixth brigade to the main army, while Feiandt could advance as far as Karstula (a few Swedish miles southeast of the two-way intersection at Lintulaks) and still effectively protect the highway leading to Kokkola; Fieandt, who had been reinforced by the other half of the 2nd Tavastehus Battalion and 230 Landwehr, was once again defeated by Jegor Vlastov, at the Battle of Karstula, on 21 August.

== Sources ==
- Hornborg, Eirik (1955). När riket sprängdes: fälttågen i Finland och Västerbotten, 1808-1809 (in Swedish). Stockholm: P. A. Norstedts och Söners Förlag.
