= Battle of Lintulaks =

1808 battle of the Finnish War

- Part of the Finnish War
Date	3 July 1808
Location	Lintulaks, Finland
Result	Russian victory

Belligerents
Sweden	Russian Empire

Commanders and leaders
Otto von Fieandt	(Russian Empire) Yegor Vlastov

Strength
600; 2 guns	1,400; 4 guns

Casualties and losses
141 killed, wounded or captured	143 killed, wounded or captured

The Battle of Lintulaks was fought between Swedish and Russian forces at Lintulaks (Lintulahti, an inn at a crossroads in the village of Kyyjärvi) in Finland on 3 July 1808 during the Finnish War.

== Background ==
After having captured a Russian transport and 100 men at Perho, on 8 June, the Swedish Major Otto von Fieandt was sent to Lintulaks, west of Kuopio, with about 600 men to observe the two-way intersection leading to Kokkola respectively Vaasa, to protect the vital Swedish supply lines; Johan August Sandels had been forced to abandon the town shortly after the Battle of Kuopio, before Barclay de Tolly's army in Savonia.

=== Swedish forces ===
- Tavastehus Infantry Regiment (2 companies)
- Savolax Infantry Regiment (2 companies)
- Savolax Jäger Regiment (2 companies)
- Nyland Dragoon Regiment ("a handful of men")
- Finnish Artillery Regiment (2 light guns)

In total: 600 men and 2 light guns

== Battle ==
On 3 July Fieandt was attacked by 1,400 men under Yegor Vlastov (sent by de Tolly); he received the attack in a fully stretched-out battle line, with no reserve, while Vlastov left one battalion and all his cavalry as reserve. At 2:00 PM it started raining and as the battle slowly started to die out, Fieandt commenced an all out bayonet attack. The first Russian lines withdrew before the Swedish onslaught but were soon caught by the reserve, which threw the Swedes back and forced them to retreat towards Perho. A Swedish detachment managed to halt the Russians by some stream, which saved them from a total disaster. The Swedes had lost 141 men in the fighting, of which 24 killed, while the Russians had lost 143, including 19 captured.

== Aftermath ==
As the Swedish field-marshal, Wilhelm Mauritz Klingspor, received news of the defeat, he immediately dispatched two battalions from the Åbo and Nyland Infantry Regiments to Fieandt, along with 2 guns and 20 dragoons — increasing his force to 1,200 men — to stop the Russians from going north, towards Kokkola, which would cut off the Swedish lines of operation. Fieandt took a renewed position behind kokonsaari mosse, 4 km northwest of Perho Church. The Russians had likewise received reinforcements and counted at least 3,100 men under Generalmajor Jankovitj; he advanced on the Swedes and the two sides met once again at the Battle of Kokonsaari, on 11 July.

== Notes, citations and sources ==
=== Sources ===
- Hornborg, Eirik (1955). När riket sprängdes: fälttågen i Finland och Västerbotten, 1808-1809 (in Swedish). Stockholm: P. A. Norstedts och Söners Förlag.
