= Nikolay Ivanovich Demidov =

- Born: 19 April 1773
- Died: 4 June 1833 (aged 60)
- Military career
- Allegiance: Russian Empire
- Branch: Imperial Russian Army
- Service years: 1790–1833
- Rank: General of the Infantry
- Commands: 21st Infantry Division; 1st Grenadier Division
- Conflicts: Napoleonic Wars; Finnish War; French invasion of Russia; Russo-Turkish War (1828–1829)
- Awards: Order of St. George, 3rd class (1808); Order of St. Vladimir, 3rd class (1808); Order of St. Alexander Nevsky

Nikolay Ivanovich Demidov (19 August 1773 – 4 June 1833 in Pyatigorsk) was a Russian General of Infantry, Adjutant-General and senator.

== Life ==
From a noble family in Ryazan province, he was the son of Brigadier Ivan Ivanovich Demidov. As was the custom of the time his birth was recorded with the Preobrazhensky Lifeguard regiment and three years later promoted to Sergeant. He entered active service on 1 January 1790, rising to captain in 1798 and colonel in 1799. In 1803 he was made a major general and placed in the Izmaylovsky Regiment before being made head of the Petrovsky Infantry Regiment on May 16, with which he marched into Prussia during the Franco-Russian War early in 1807, though he did not participate in hostilities. Also in 1807 he formed the Libavskogo Infantry Regiment. In 1808 he joined the Russian army sent to the Finnish War, where he was put in charge of 2 infantry battalions and 200 Cossacks to besiege Vaasa; he won a battle there; later his troops fought at the Battle of Oravais under Nikolay Kamensky. In 1828 he was promoted to General of the Infantry, before that in 1825 he was promoted to Adjutant-General.

He was awarded with the Order of St. George, Third Degree for his services.
