= Year 1809 =

Year 1809 (Märkesåret 1809 in Swedish and Merkkivuosi 1809 in Finnish, literally meaning "The Significant Year 1809") was a joint Swedish–Finnish government project about the 2009 bicentennial of the division of Sweden, when Sweden had to cede Finland to Russia. Both Sweden and Finland observed the bicentennial with various activities, which showed both the history of the partition and the close connection between the two countries since the mid 13th century.

== Background ==
For 560 years, since the Second Swedish Crusade in 1249, Sweden and Finland had been one country; but after the Russian victory in the Finnish War 1808-1809, Sweden had to cede Finland to Russia at the Treaty of Fredrikshamn on 17 September 1809. Russia in turn made Finland the autonomous grand principality the Grand Duchy of Finland, a constitutional monarchy within the autocratic Russian Empire.

Year 1809 was significant in many ways for both countries, beside being the year that separated Finland from Sweden. For Sweden, 1809 was also the birth year of modern Swedish constitutional monarchy, as the Constitution of 1809 returned Sweden to parliamentarism and put an end to the enlightened absolutism that Gustav III had introduced through a coup d'état in 1772. It was also the year when the Parliamentary Ombudsman and the Committee on the Constitution were created. For Finland, the eventual realisation that it would never be reunited with Sweden, gave birth to Finnish nationalism, thus creating the foundation for the Finnish independence in 1917.

The separation of Sweden and Finland had consequences outside the two countries. When the Finnish War started, after an attack from Russia in February 1808, Sweden had just started an invasion of Norway, having joined the British side in the Napoleonic Wars against France and its ally Denmark–Norway. This two-front war was largely the reason for the loss against Russia. In 1812 and early 1813, the newly elected Swedish crown prince, the French marshal and former commander under Napoleon, Jean Baptiste Bernadotte held secret negotiations with both Russia, United Kingdom and Prussia, where he offered to join the battle against Napoleon in return for Sweden getting Norway as prize. They agreed, and in 1813 he allied Sweden with Napoleon's enemies of the Sixth Coalition in order to secure this. Charles John, as the Commander-in-Chief of the Northern Army, successfully defended the approaches to Berlin and was victorious in battle against Oudinot in August and against Ney in September at the Battles of Großbeeren and Dennewitz. But after the Battle of Leipzig he went his own way, determined at all hazards to cripple Denmark and to secure Norway, defeating the Danes at Bornhöved in December. His efforts culminated in the Treaty of Kiel, where king Frederick VI of Denmark agreed to cede Norway to Sweden. The Norwegians weren't as keen, though, but after losing the Swedish-Norwegian War of 1814, Norway entered a personal union with Sweden which lasted until 1905, when Norway reached full independence.
