= Manana Orbeliani =

Georgian noblewoman and socialite (1808–1870)

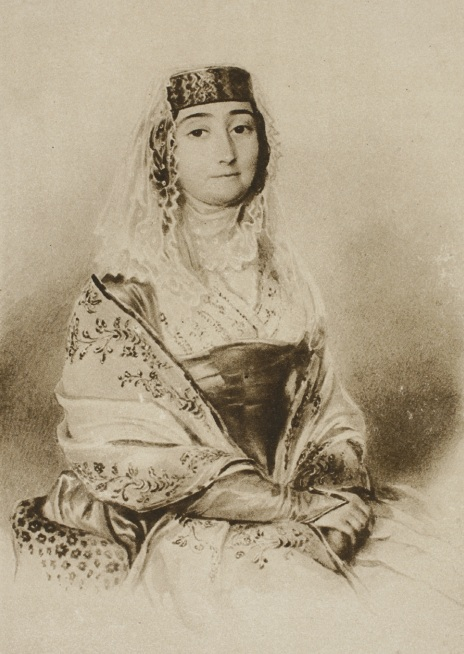
Manana Orbeliani

Princess Manana Orbeliani (Georgian: მანანა ორბელიანი; 1808 – 3 June 1870) was a Georgian noblewoman and socialite, whose salon in Tiflis (modern Tbilisi) was frequented by the leading literary and political figures of Georgia, then part of the Russian Empire, of the mid-19th century.

== Family ==
Manana was born into the family of Lieutenant Colonel Prince Mirmanoz Eristavi of the Ksani (1771–1828) and his wife, Princess Tamar née Abashishvili (1790–1809). In 1828 Manana married Prince David Orbeliani (1801–1830), member of one of the leading aristocratic families of Georgia. The couple had three children:

- Prince Ivan Orbeliani (1825–1893), eventually major-general of the Imperial Russian Army,
- Princess Anastasia (1826–1907), subsequently wife of General Alexander Gagarin,
- Prince Alexander (1829–1869), subsequently colonel of the Imperial Russian Army and Marshal of Nobility of the Tiflis uyezd.

== 1832 plot ==
Princess Manana became widowed in 1830 and moved to live with the family of his brother-in-law, Major Prince Luarsab Orbeliani, until the latter's death and friction with her sister-in-law, Ana Orbeliani, in 1835. Early in the 1830s, the Orbeliani house was the principal venue of gatherings of the disaffected Georgian nobles and intellectuals, eventually leading to a conspiracy against the Imperial Russian rule in 1832. After the plot collapsed and its numbers were rounded up, Manana Orbeliani wrote to Baron Rosen, the Russian commander-in-chief of the Caucasus, and admitted to being cognizant of the evolving coup, but denied her involvement in organizing it. She was spared arrest or exile, but was placed under a police surveillance for several years.

== Socialite ==
In the 1840s and 1850s, Manana Orbeliani hosted a salon in Tiflis, which attracted Georgians from the leading literary and political circles as well as foreign guests, earning from the journalist Iona Meunargia a moniker of "the Madame Récamier of ours". She was on friendly terms with the family of Prince Mikhail Vorontsov, a liberal Russian viceroy. The Russian writer Leo Tolstoy described Manana, whom he met in Tiflis, in his Hadji Murat as "a tall, plump, forty-five-year-old beauty of oriental stamp". It was in her salon that major cultural undertakings of the 1850s, such as founding the leading Georgian literary magazine Tsiskari ("Dawn") and a professional theatre troupe was conceived and agreed upon. Manana Orbeliani died at the age of 62 in 1870 and was buried next to her late husband at the church of the Holy Trinity in Kumisi.
