= Battle of Vaasa =

1808 battle of the Finnish War

- Part of the Finnish War
Date	25–26 June 1808
Location	Vaasa, Swedish Finland 63°06′00″N 21°37′00″E
Result	Russian victory

Belligerents
Kingdom of Sweden	Russian Empire

Commanders and leaders
Johan Bergenstråhle	(Russian Empire) Nikolay Demidov

Strength
1,100 infantry 200–300 peasants 4 guns	1,488 infantry 200 Cossacks; 4 guns

Casualties and losses
Swedish estimate: 272 Russian estimate: 567; 1 gun	150–172
- Location within Finland Battle of Vaasa (Europe)

The Battle of Vaasa was fought between the Kingdom of Sweden and the Russian Empire during the Finnish War (1808-1809).

While the Swedish army was celebrating its victory at Nykarleby, another Swedish force, led by Johan Bergenstråhle, landed at Vaasa. Adlercreutz had forgot about this landing and didn't send any troops to help Bergenstråhle. The Swedes, numbering 1,300–1,400 men, landed just outside Vaasa, but the Russians under Nikolay Demidov, strengthened by the arrival of the Russian main army, turned out to be too strong. After some harsh street battles, the Russians lost 37 killed, 82–113 wounded (five officers) and, according to certain sources, 53 captured; in total 150–172 men. By their own accounts, the Swedes had lost 76 men killed or severely wounded, two lightly wounded, and 194 captured (including the commander). According to Russian sources, up to 300 Swedes were killed and wounded, and 250 privates and 17 officers captured; in total 567 men. The remaining forces retreated northwards, to the Swedish main army at Nykarleby, and created the Sixth [Swedish] brigade.

== Russian forces ==
- Infantry (1,488)
- Cossacks (200)
- Guns (4)

In total: 1,688 men and 4 guns

== Swedish forces ==
- Västerbotten Infantry Regiment (1 battalion)
- Västerbotten auxiliary reserve and Jämtland Infantry Regiment (1 battalion; including 2 Jämtland companies)
- Peasants (200–300)
- Guns (4)

In total: 1,300–1,400 men and 4 guns

== Sources ==
- Leer, Heinrich (1885). Encyclopedia of Military and Marine Sciences (1885) (in Russian). Saint Petersburg: Bezobrazov Printing House.
- Hornborg, Eirik (1955). När riket sprängdes: fälttågen i Finland och Västerbotten, 1808-1809 (in Swedish). Stockholm: P. A. Norstedts och Söners Förlag.
- Generalstaben (1910). Sveriges krig åren 1808 och 1809. 2, Bilagor (in Swedish). Vol. 5. Stockholm: Kongl. boktryckeriet P. A. Norstedt & söner.
