= Battle of Kuopio =

1808 battle of the Finnish War

- Part of the Finnish War
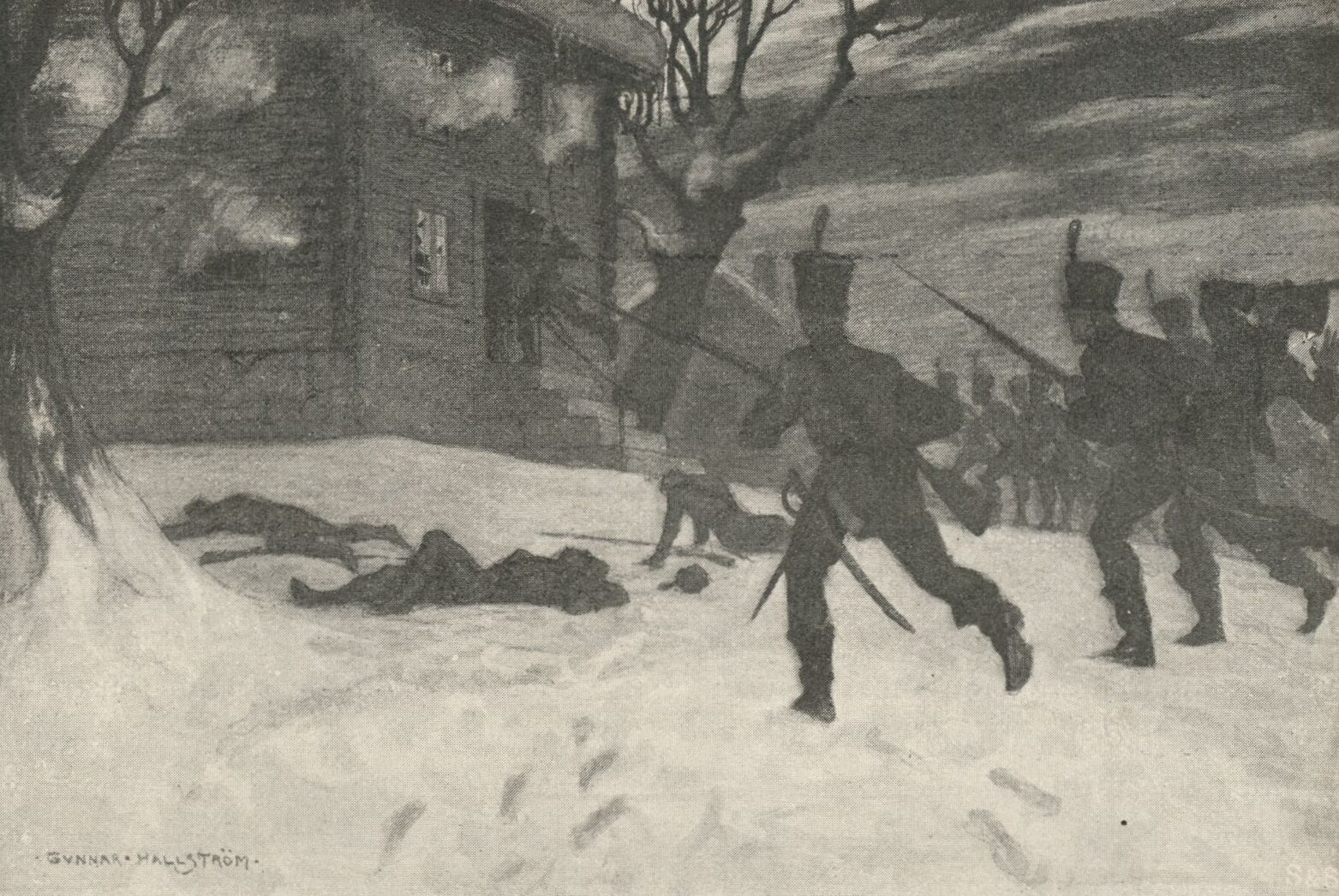
- The storming of the Kuopio chancellery Gunnar Hallström, 1898
Date	12 May 1808
Location	Kuopio, Finland
Result	Swedish victory

Belligerents
Sweden	Russian Empire

Commanders and leaders
Karl Wilhelm Malm	

Strength
150 infantry 300 peasants	400 (inclusive 124 sick)

Casualties and losses
2 killed 1 wounded	40 killed or wounded 284 captured

The Battle of Kuopio was fought between Swedish and Russian forces at Kuopio in Northern Savonia on 12 May 1808 during the Finnish War.

== Background ==
As a result of the victory at Pulkkila Sandels could commence operations to the south and harass the Russian supply lines. He first struck against a number of Russian transports heading for Raahe, south of Pulkkila, capturing two supply and one weapon transports, along with 100 Russians. Another transport column was captured northwest of Kuopio. Sandels then sent a vanguard of 150 men (of which 80 from the Västerbotten Regiment), under Karl Wilhelm Malm, to attack a Russian supply magazine at Kuopio where there was also an improvised field hospital. On their way they managed to surprise and destroy a Russian force of 150 men, sent out from Kuopio to retake the lost supplies; seven Russians were killed and 98 captured to no Swedish losses.

== Battle ==
As Malm arrived in the vicinity of Kuopio on the 11th he was joined by approximately 300 peasants. However, only about 50 of them carried firearms, and so Malm thought it was best to have them encircling the town rather than following in the attack. On 12 May, at 2:00 AM, Malm split his infantry into three groups of 50 men each, after which he commenced the attack. The complete surprise, combined with the darkness and the lack of Russian command, shattered the Russian defense; they were met by stubborn resistance only in the chancellery, where a couple of Russians had taken up positions. By 6:00 AM the rest of the Russians surrendered; they had lost 40 killed and wounded and 160 captured, apart from a few civilians and 124 sick soldiers. Two officers and about 70 men had managed to escape despite the peasants encircling the town. The Swedes had lost two men killed and one wounded. The bulk of the Swedish force arrived at Kuopio on 20 May.

== Notes, citations and sources ==
=== Sources ===
- Hornborg, Eirik (1955). När riket sprängdes: fälttågen i Finland och Västerbotten, 1808-1809 (in Swedish). Stockholm: P. A. Norstedts och Söners Förlag.
