= Johan Bergenstråhle =

Swedish military officer (1756–1840)

Major general Johan Bergenstråhle
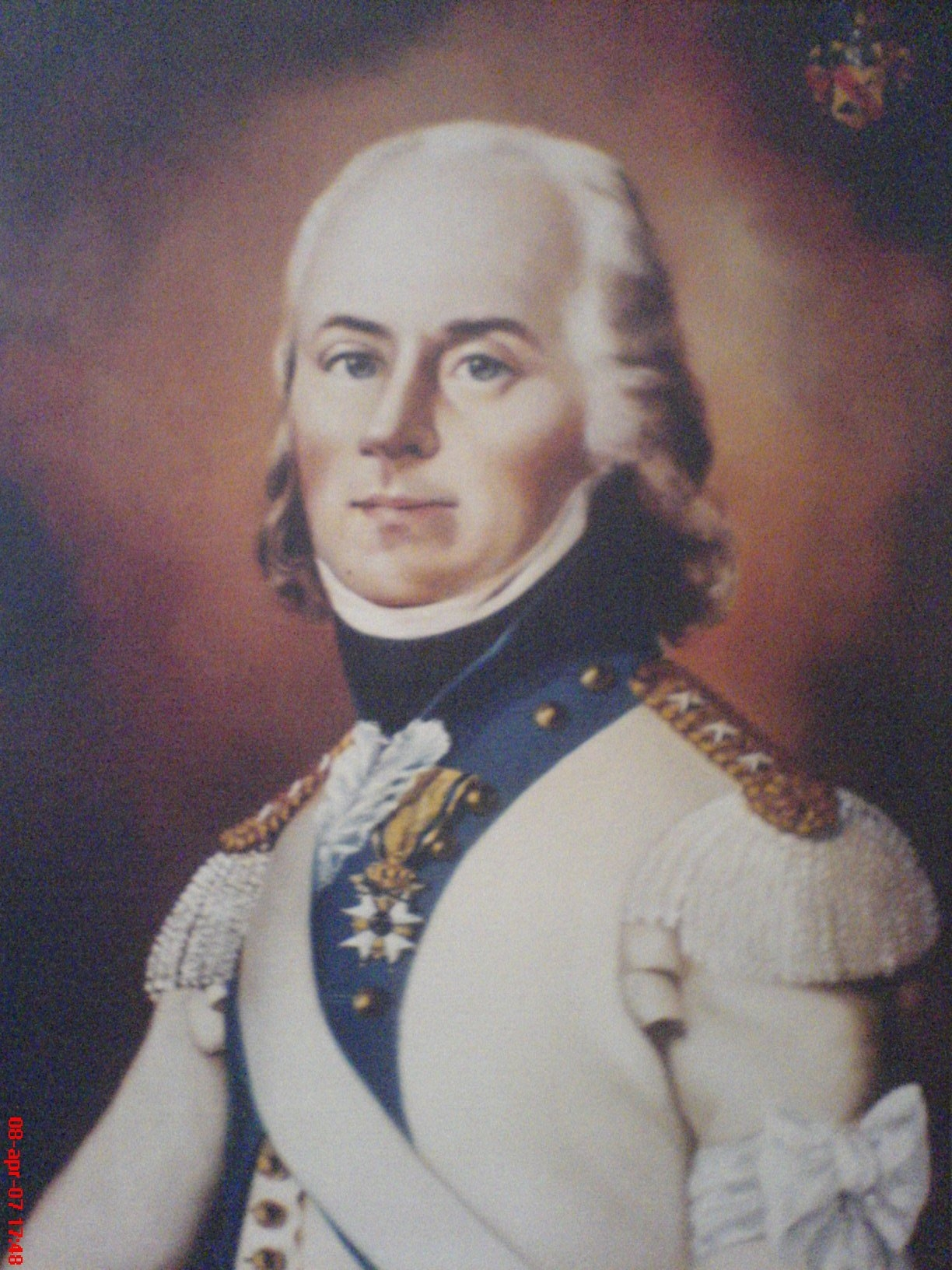
- Born: Johan Bergenstråhle; 13 May 1756
- Died: 7 March 1840 (aged 83); Stockholm, Sweden
- Spouses: Carolina Margareta von Christiersson (m. 1785; d. 1799) Ulrika Gustava Riddersvärd (m. 1800)
- Military career
- Allegiance: Sweden
- Branch: Swedish Army
- Service years: 1788–1813
- Rank: Major general
- Unit: Nyland Regiment
- Commands: Nyland Regiment; Västerbotten Regiment
- Conflicts: Russo-Swedish War (1788–1790); Dano-Swedish War (1808–1809); Finnish War

Johan Bergenstråhle (13 May 1756 – 7 March 1840 in Stockholm) was a Swedish military officer who participated in Russo-Swedish War (1788–1790), and the Finnish War. In June 1808, he was sent as a colonel of the Swedish Army, with 1,000 men and four cannons to Vaasa in order to retake the city from the Russians. The expedition failed and Bergenstråhle was wounded and captured on 25 June.

== Military career ==
- 1788, lieutenant colonel at Nylands infanteri
- 1805, colonel at Västerbotten Regiment
- 1813, retired as major general

== Personal life ==
Bergenstråhle was married on 12 October 1785 to Carolina Margareta von Cristiersson (1767–1799), and they had seven children. He remarried on 23 September 1800 to Ulrika Gustava Riddersvärd (1781–1849), and they had ten children.

== Sources ==
- Nordisk Familjebok
