= Battle of Sandöström =

1808 battle of the Finnish War

- Part of the Finnish War
Date	2–3 August 1808
Location	Finnish archipelago, near Kimito
Result	Russian victory

Belligerents
Sweden	Russian Empire

Commanders and leaders
Klas Hjelmstjerna; Önnert Jönsson; Sölfverarm	Lodewijk van Heiden; Pyotr Dodt

Strength
22 gun sloops	12 gun sloops 38 gun yawls

Casualties and losses
36 killed 93 wounded 12 ships damaged	121 killed 200 wounded 35 ships damaged

The Battle of Sandöström was fought between Sweden and Russia during the Finnish War 1808-09.

== Prelude ==
After failing to destroy the Russian coastal units near Åbo (Finnish: Turku) in the battles of Rimito Kramp and Bockholmssund, the Swedes attempted to remove the Russian reinforcements. As the Swedish fleet controlled the open sea, the incoming Russian ships were forced to use narrow coastal waterways, and so the Swedes deployed a detachment of gun sloops under Captain Sölfverarm to block the passage north of the island of Kimito at the small island of Tallholmen.

Swedish Rear Admiral Klas Hjelmstjerna was forced to split his forces in order to prevent Russian coastal forces from Åbo from accessing his rear flank, and so he initially gave Sölfverarm only 8 gun sloops but later reinforced him with another 4. He retained 14 gun sloops and 7 galleys for himself and posted an additional 4 gun sloops to block other coastal waterways. Sölfverarm was aware of the weaknesses of his position and started blockading the waterway north of Kimito.

== Battle ==
The first attempt to breach Sölfverarm's position happened on 18 July when 6 Russian gun sloops unsuccessfully tried to get past the Swedes in what has become known as the Battle of Tallholmen. Slightly after midnight on 21 July, a detachment of 30 Russian gun yawls under the command of Captain 1st class Login Geiden made the next attempt at passage with the support of Russian artillery batteries and ground forces on the shore. Though greatly outnumbered the Swedes managed to make an orderly withdrawal. Neither side managed to sink any ships, however the Swedes suffered casualties of 46 dead and wounded to the Russians' 19, though Russian commander Geiden was among the badly wounded.

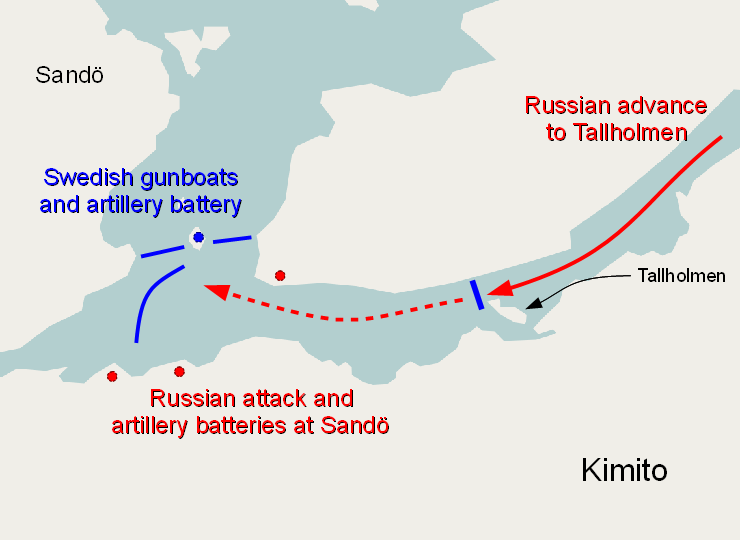
Battles of Tallholmen and Sandöström

Sölfverarm continued to strengthen his defenses and constructed an artillery battery on an island in the middle of the narrow passage. The Swedes were also reinforced by Lieutenant Colonel Önnert Jönsson - who took command - with another 10 gun sloops. The Russians also gained reinforcements and were now able to field 50 armed vessels. In addition to naval assets, the Russians had 1 six-gun and 1 four-gun batteries, 2 field guns, and six companies of infantry in support.

The Russian attack started on 2 August at 0300. The Swedish battery in the middle of the passage proved to be very effective even though it was subjected to heavy fire. Though several of their gun sloops were forced to withdraw from the battle line, the Swedes managed to beat back the initial Russian attack. More attacks followed during the day but Swedes were still able to hold their line. Later, however, a stronger Russian attack managed to breach the Swedish line and force Swedish naval forces into withdrawal, leaving the artillery battery surrounded by Russians.

The Swedish withdrawal was orderly and the Russians failed to take advantage of it before Hjelmstjerna's reserves arrived. But instead of counterattacking with fresh forces against an enemy who had expended most of their ammunition, he chose to withdraw. Though the battle itself was not a clear victory for either side, the Russians managed to gain access through the coastal waterways and link their coastal naval units.

== Related Activities ==
While the naval battle was being fought at Sandöström, another Swedish unit was performing landing operations on the island of Kimito. As the landing operation suffered from multiple delays, the initial goal of the operation - to provide support in preventing the Russian coastal fleet from getting past the island - was a failure. However, after learning that Friedrich Wilhelm von Buxhoeveden, the Russian commander of operations in Finland, was dining at nearby manor house in Vestankärr, Colonel Axel af Pàlen, commander of the landing force, decided to attempt capturing him. Af Pàlen and his 150 men managed to reach the vicinity of the manor house without being seen, but while the Swedes were moving in to surround the building the Russian pickets saw them and alerted their commander, who managed to escape. Arriving Russian reinforcements forced the Swedish landing force to withdraw.

== Bibliography ==
- Mattila, Tapani (1983). Meri maamme turvana [Sea safeguarding our country] (in Finnish). Jyväskylä: K. J. Gummerus Osakeyhtiö. ISBN 951-99487-0-8.
- Lars Ericson Wolke, Martin Hårdstedt, Medströms Bokförlag (2009). Svenska sjöslag
