= Battle of Ömossa =

- Part of the Finnish War
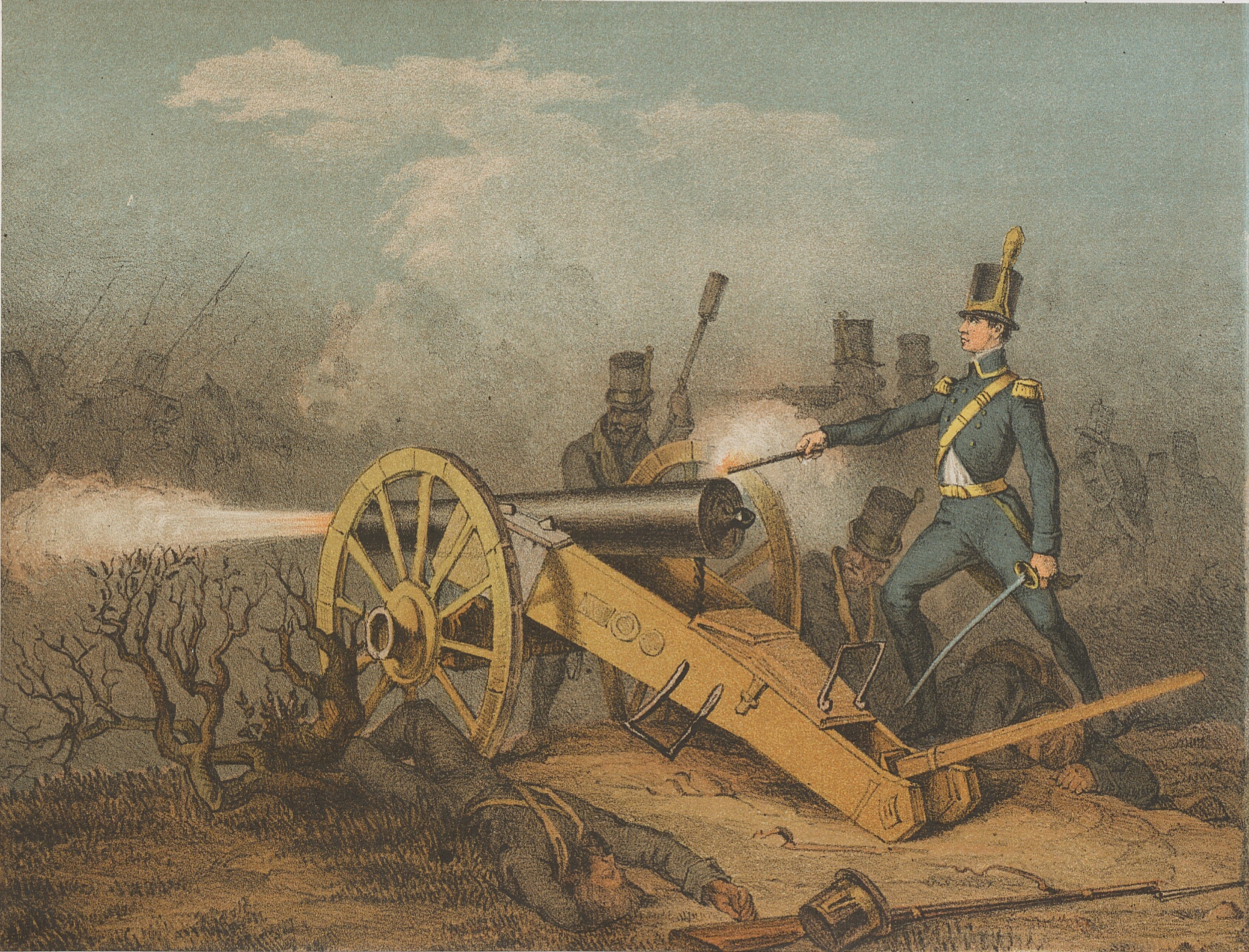
- The artillery under the command of Wilhelm von Schwerin.
| Date | 6 September 1808 |
| Location | Ömossa, Finland |
| Result | Russian victory |

Belligerents
| Sweden | Russian Empire |

Commanders and leaders
| Thure Drufva | (Russian Empire) Colonel Bibikov |

Strength
| 500 men; 2 cannons | 1,300–1,500 men; 6 cannons |

Casualties and losses
| 60–64 men killed, wounded, or captured | Unknown |

The Battle of Ömossa took place on 6 September 1808, when a Russian detachment successfully forced its way through a Swedish outpost at Ömossa.

== Background ==
Following the fall of Kauhajoki, Russian General Knorring assumed command along the Björneborg road and ordered an advance. Colonel Bibikov's detachment, assembled at Honkajärvi on 5 September, was tasked with pushing toward the Swedish outpost at Ömossa, held by 500 men from the Uppland Regiment and 2 guns, all under Lieutenant Colonel Thure Drufva, who was ordered to fight till the last man.

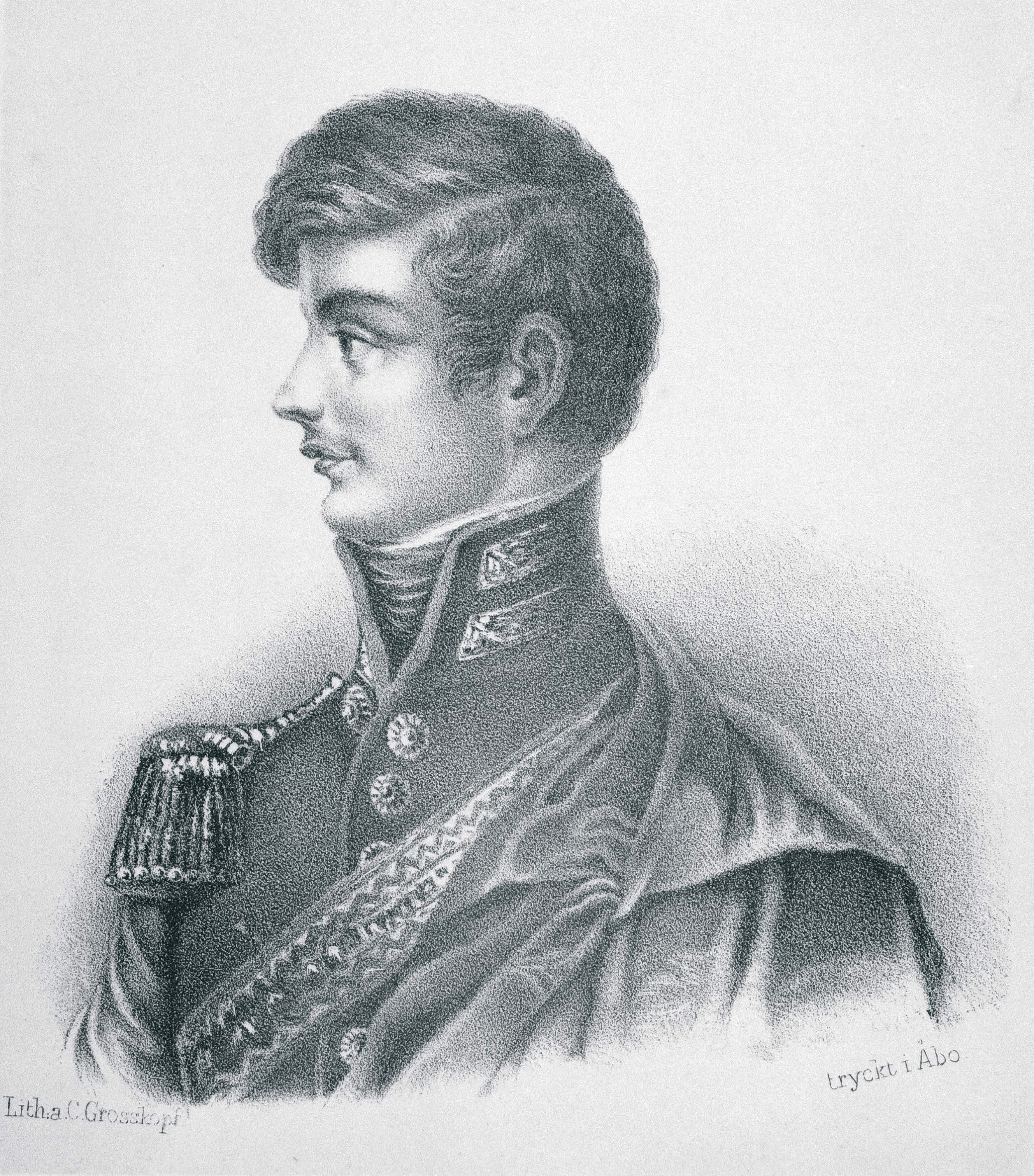
Wilhelm von Schwerin, who commanded the artillery.

== Battle ==
On 6 September 1808, Bibikov's detachment of five companies attacked the Swedish outpost at Ömossa. Despite initial resistance, Drufva's 2 cannons could not be effectively placed against Russian artillery, and both flanks came under heavy pressure. The Swedes withdrew to higher ground north of the village, where fighting resumed. Russian infantry attempted to outflank the position in rough terrain, while repeated frontal attacks by Cossacks were repelled with canister fire from the Swedish cannons under Vilhelm von Schwerin. Threatened with encirclement, Drufva ordered a retreat toward Träskvik, pursued by Russian cavalry.

== Aftermath ==
Early in the morning, Drufva reached Träskvik and was reinforced by 100 men, after which the Russian pursuit ceased.
