= Battle of Karstula =

1808 battle of the Finnish War

Coordinates: 62.8769°N 24.8022°E

- Part of the Finnish War
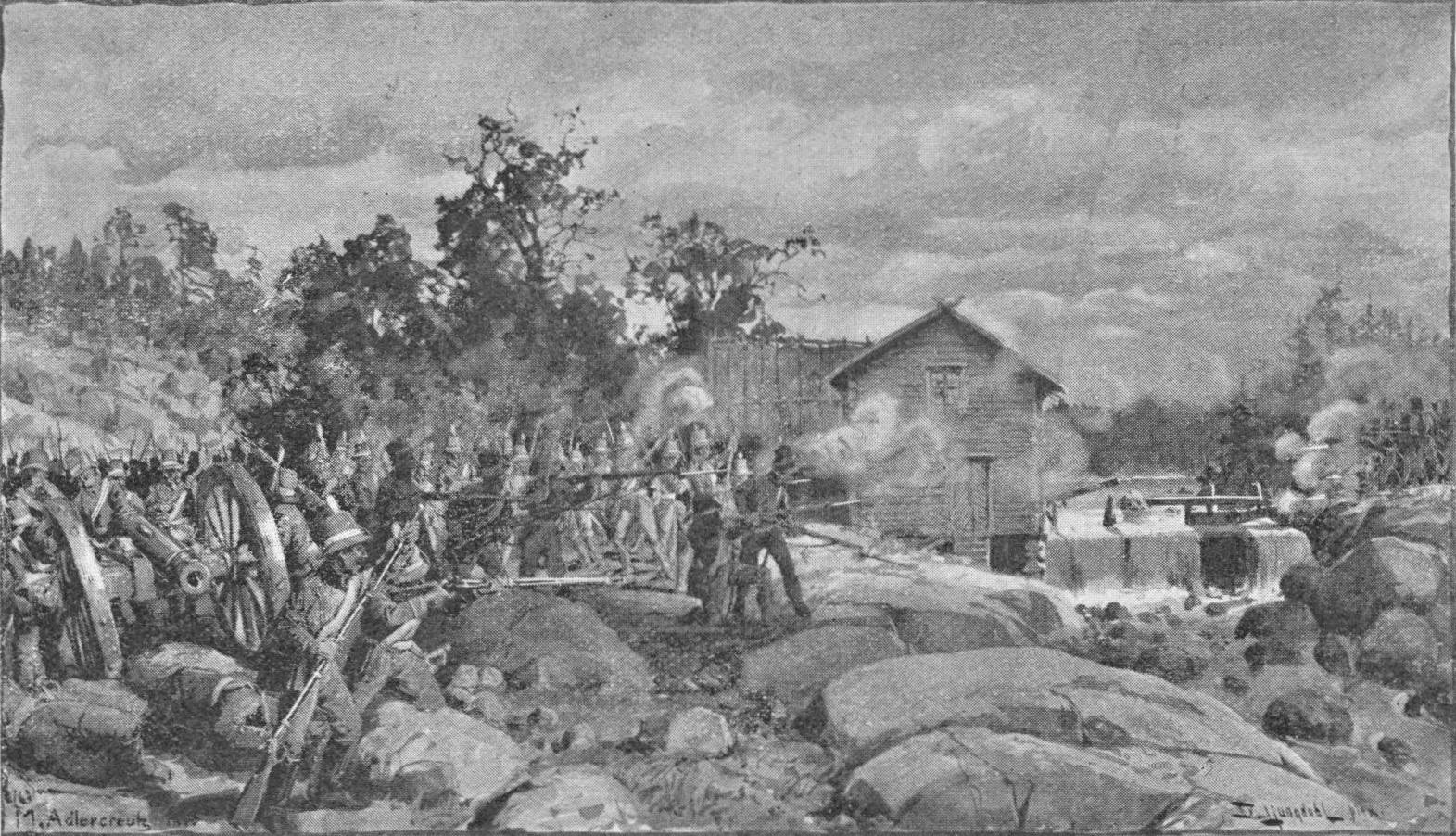
- Tavastehusarnas strid vid Karstula, by Magnus Adlercreutz and David Ljungdahl
Date	21 August 1808
Location	Karstula, Swedish Finland
Result	Russian victory

Belligerents
Sweden	Russian Empire

Commanders and leaders
Otto von Fieandt	(Russian Empire) Yegor Vlastov

Strength
1,500–1,600; 6 guns	3,200; 7 guns

Casualties and losses
313: 60 killed 116 wounded 137 missing (Note: Missing are presumed to be either killed or captured, or soldier who has been dispersed during the battle.)	245 killed, wounded or captured

The Battle of Karstula was fought between Swedish and Russian troops on August 21, 1808. The Swedish force under Otto von Fieandt was defeated by a much bigger Russian force under Yegor Vlastov. During the battle and retreat the Swedes lost 313 men, the Russians lost 245.

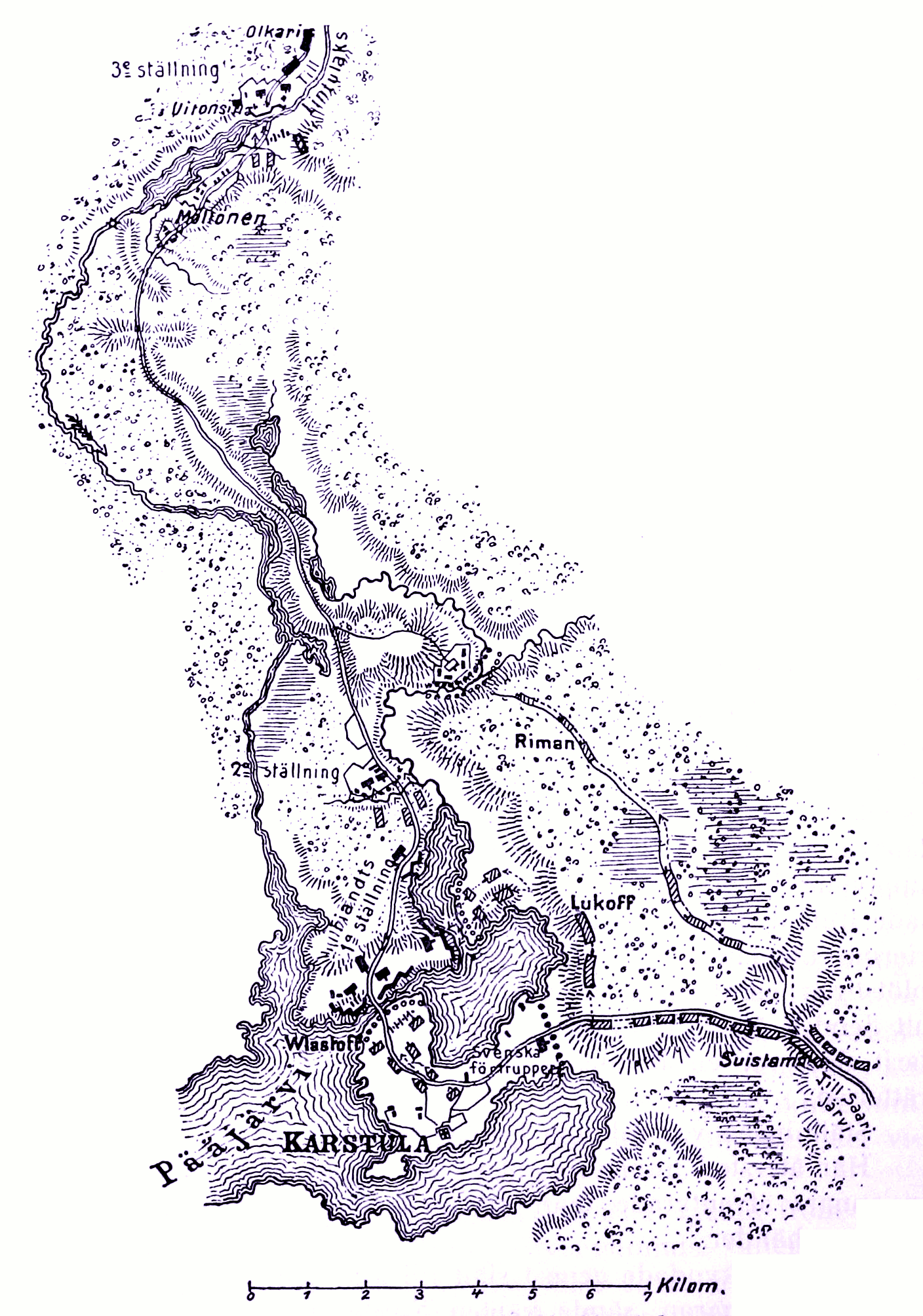
Positions of the forces

== Notes, citations and sources ==
=== Sources ===
- Hornborg, Eirik (1955). När riket sprängdes: fälttågen i Finland och Västerbotten, 1808-1809 (in Swedish). Stockholm: P. A. Norstedts och Söners Förlag.
- Julius Mankell. Anteckningar rörande finska arméens och Finlands krigshistoria särskildt med afseende på krigen emellan sverige och ryssland åren 1788-1790 samt 1808-1809, Volume 2. P.A. Norstedt & Söner, 1870. pp. 199–201.
- Georg Carl von Döbeln (1856-1878). Några anteckningar om och af general von Döbeln, Volume 2. p. 51
