= Västerbotten Regiment =

Coordinates: 63°50′03″N 20°15′34″E

- Västerbottens regemente
- Active: 1624–1709, 1709–2000
- Country: Sweden
- Allegiance: Swedish Armed Forces
- Branch: Swedish Army
- Type: Infantry
- Size: Regiment
- Part of: 6th Military District (1833–1847); 5th Military District (1847–1888); 6th Military District (1889–1893); 6th Army Division (1893–1901); VI Army Division (1902–1927); Upper Norrland's Troops (1928–1942); VI Military District (1942–1966); Upper Norrland Military District (1966–1993); Northern Military District (1993–2000)
- Garrison/HQ: Umeå
- Nickname: The Wild man
- Motto: De hava aldrig vikit eller för egen del tappat ("They have never backed down or for their own part lost")
- Colors: Red, blue and white
- March: "Helenen-marsch" (Lübbert) (Note: The march was adopted in 1936 and was established in 1953 by Army Order 33/1953. The march was used by the Lappland Brigade (Lapplandsbrigaden) from 1994 to 2000 and by the Västerbotten Group (Västerbottensgruppen) since 2000.)
- Anniversaries: 3 February, 28 June, 4 July, 5 July, 8 July, 9 July, 14 July, 23 August, 31 August, 8 October
- Battle honours: Landskrona (1677), Düna (1701), Kliszów (1702), Fraustadt (1706), Malatitze (1708), Strömstad (1717)

Insignia
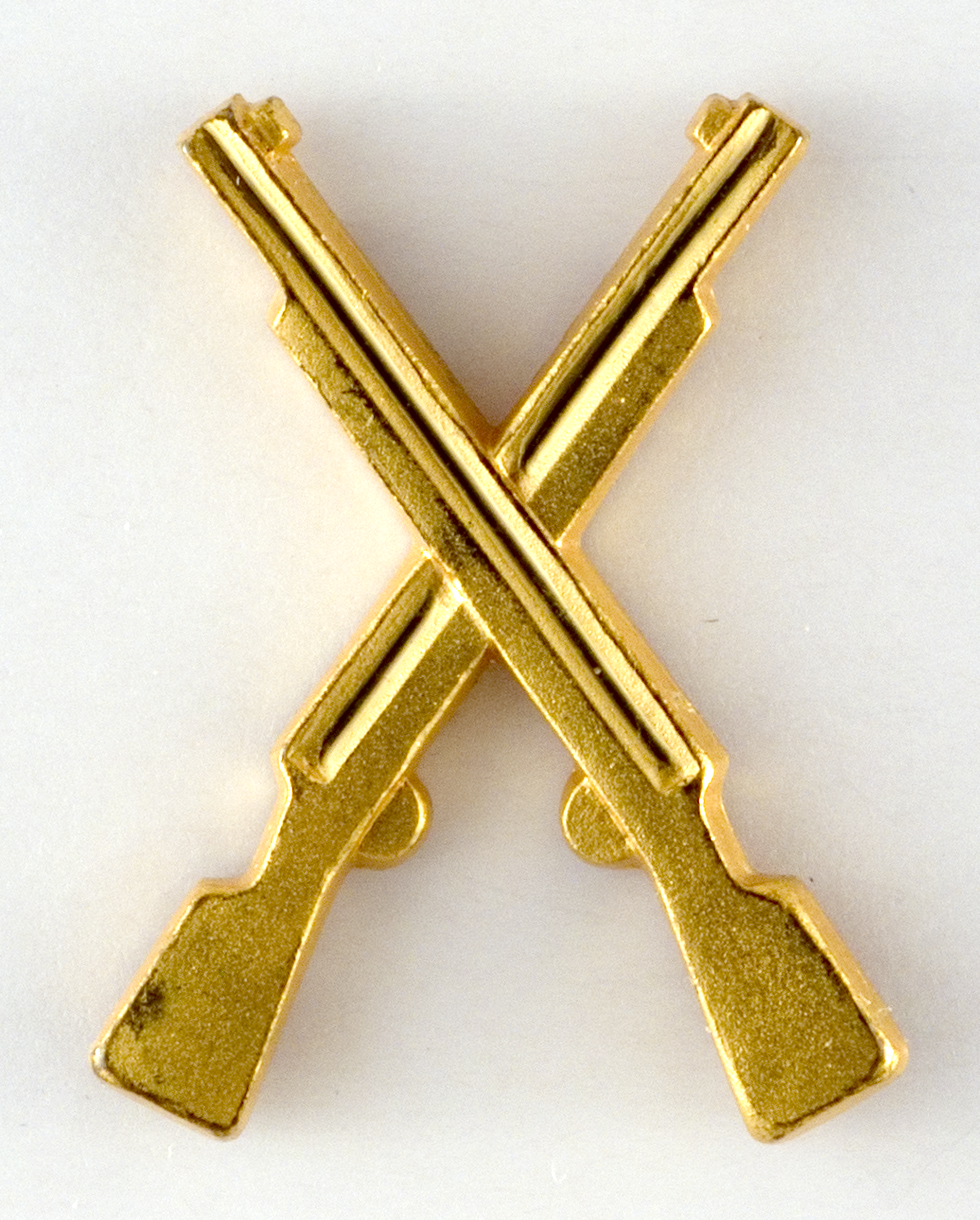
- Branch insignia m/60

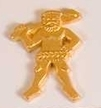
- Unit insignia m/60

The Västerbotten Regiment (Swedish: Västerbottens regemente), designations I 19, I XIX, I 20 and I 20/Fo 61, was a Swedish Army infantry regiment that traced its origins back to the 16th century. The regiment's soldiers were originally recruited from the province of Västerbotten, where it was later garrisoned. The unit was disbanded as a result of the disarmament policies set forward in the Defence Act of 2000.

== History ==
The regiment has its origins in fänikor (companies) raised in Västerbotten in the 1550s and 1560s. In 1615, these units—along with fänikor from the nearby provinces of Ångermanland, Medelpad, Hälsingland and Gästrikland—were organised by Gustav II Adolf into Norrlands storregemente, of which seven of the total 24 companies were recruited in Västerbotten. Norrlands storregemente consisted of three field regiments, of which Västerbotten Regiment was one. Sometime around 1624, the grand regiment was permanently split into three smaller regiments, of which Västerbotten Regiment was one.

Västerbotten Regiment was one of the original 20 Swedish infantry regiments mentioned in the Swedish constitution of 1634. The regiment was allotted in 1696. It changed name to Västerbotten Ranger Regiment in 1829, and was split into two corps units of battalion size in 1841, one of them being Västerbotten Ranger Corps, the other being Norrbotten Ranger Corps. The unit was upgraded to regimental size and renamed back to Västerbotten Regiment in 1892. The regiment had its training grounds at various places in Västerbotten, but was eventually garrisoned in Umeå in 1909.

The regiment was given the designation I 19 (19th Infantry Regiment) in a general order in 1816, but that designation was given to Norrbotten Ranger Corps when the unit split, and Västerbotten Ranger Corps was instead given the designation I XIX (XIXth Infantry Regiment, XIX which in the Roman numeral system equals 19). When the unit regained its old name and size in 1892, the designation was changed to I 20 (20th Infantry Regiment).

== Campaigns ==
- The Second Polish War (1600–1629)
- The Thirty Years' War (1630–1648)
- The Northern Wars (1655–1661)
- The Scanian War (1674–1679)
- The Great Northern War (1700–1721)
- The Hats' Russian War (1741–1743)
- The Seven Years' War (1757–1762)
- The Gustav III's Russian War (1788–1790)
- The Finnish War (1808–1809)
- The Campaign against Norway (1814)

== Organisation ==
1634(?)

- Livkompaniet
- Överstelöjtnantens kompani
- Majorens kompani
- Lövångers kompani
- Kalix kompani
- Bygdeå kompani
- Skellefteå kompani
- Piteå kompani

1841

- Livkompaniet
- Skellefteå kompani
- Bygdeå kompani
- Lövångers kompani

== Heraldry and traditions ==
=== Colours, standards and guidons ===
The regiment has presented several colours. On 20 June 1952, the regiment was presented with its last colour by His Majesty King Gustaf VI Adolf in Umeå. It then replaced the 1902 colour. The new one was used as regimental colour until 1 July 2000. The colour is drawn by Sven Sköld. It has not been possible to discover who has manufactured the colour. It was embroidered by hand in insertion technique. Blazon: "On white cloth the provincial badge of Lappland; a red savage with green garlands of birch leaves around head and loins, a yellow club on the right shoulder. On a red border at the upper side of the colour, battle honours (Landskrona 1677, Düna 1701, Kliszów 1702, Fraustadt 1706, Malatitze 1708, Strömstad 1717) in white."

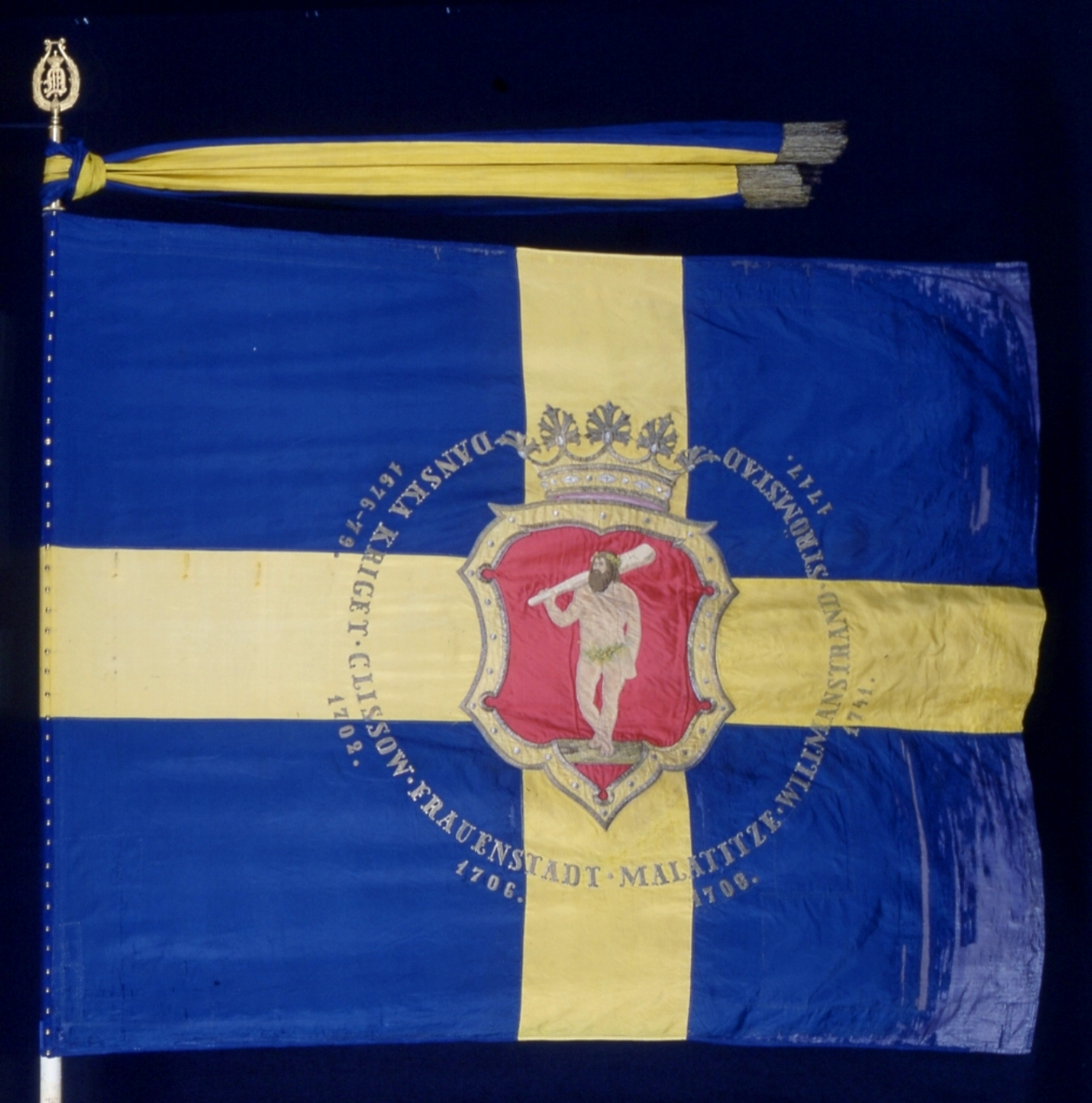
1878 colour of the regiment.

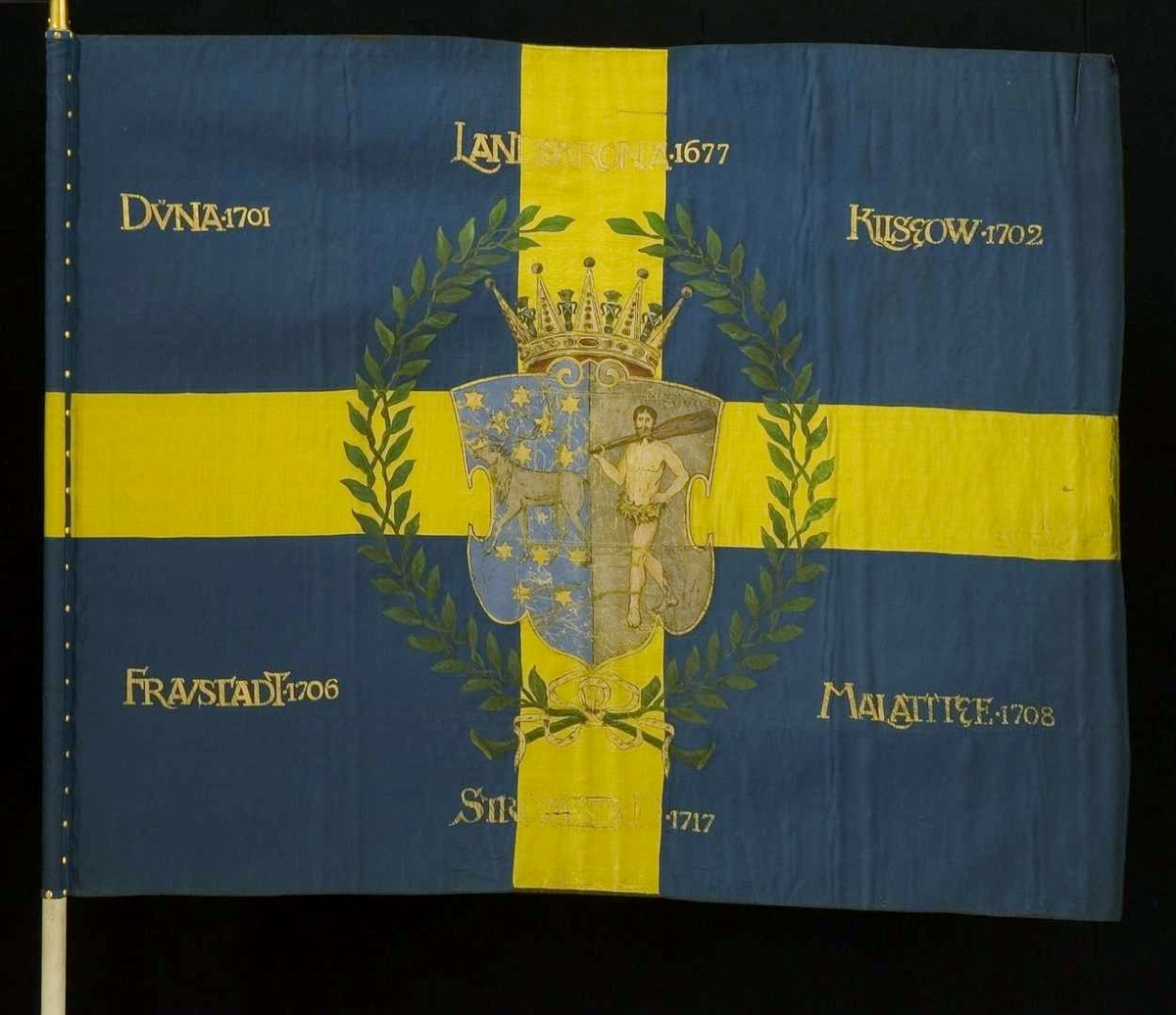
1897 colour of the 1st Battalion.

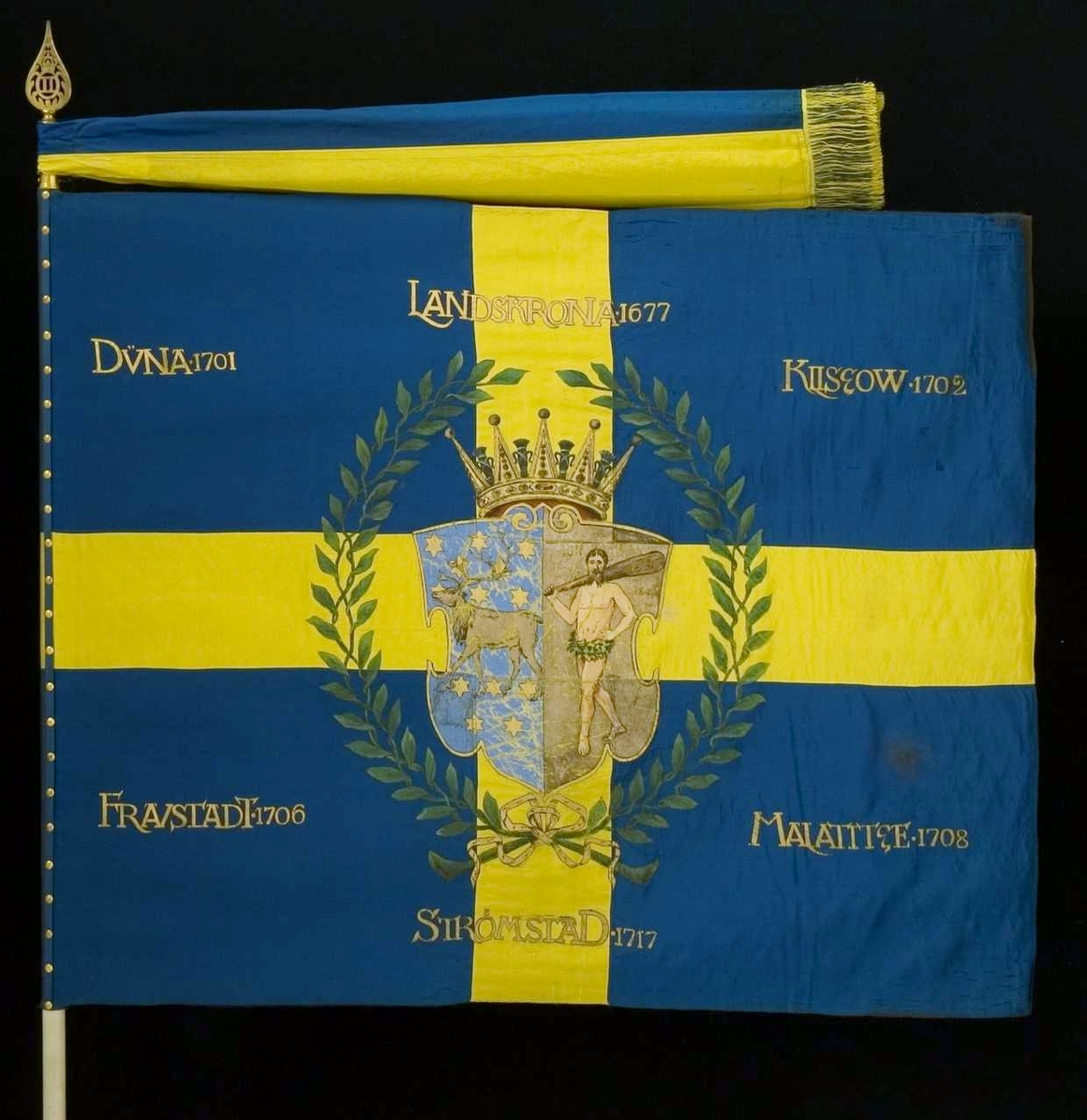
1897 colour of the 2nd Battalion.

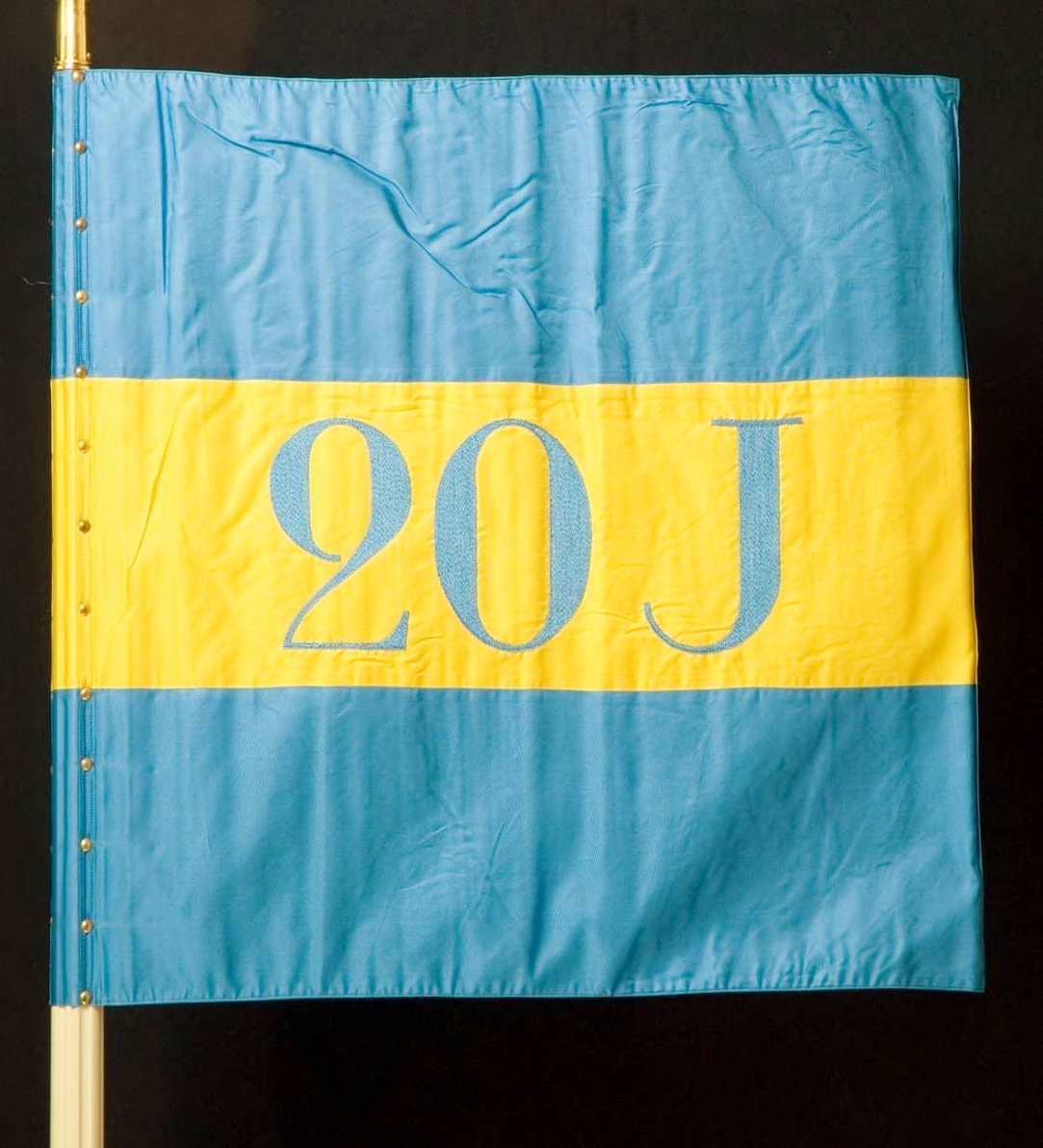
1920s standard of the 20th Ranger Brigade.

=== Coat of arms ===
The coat of the arms of the Västerbotten Regiment (I 20/Fo 61) 1977–1994 and the Lapland Brigade (Lapplandsbrigaden, NB 20) 1994–1997. Blazon: "Argent, the provincial badge of Lapland, a savage gules, garlands of birch leaves vert around head and loins, holding a club or on his right shoulder. The shield surmounted two muskets in saltire or." The coat of arms of the Västerbotten Regiment (I 20/Fo 61) 1994–2000 and the Västerbotten Group (Västerbottensgruppen) since 2000. Blazon: "Argent, the provincial badge of Lapland, a savage gules, gar-lands of birch leaves vert around head and loins, holding a club or on his right shoulder. The shield surmounted two swords in saltire or."

Coat of arms of the Västerbotten Regiment (I 20/Fo 61) 1977–1994 and the Lapland Brigade (Lapplandsbrigaden, NB 20) 1994–1997.

Coat of the arms of the Västerbotten Regiment (I 20/Fo 61) 1994–2000 and the Västerbotten Group (Västerbottensgruppen) 2000–present.

=== Medals ===
In 2000, the Västerbottens regementes (I 20) minnesmedalj ("Västerbotten Regiment (I 20) Commemorative Medal") in silver (VbottenregSMM) of the 8th size was established. The medal ribbon is divided in white, red and white moiré.

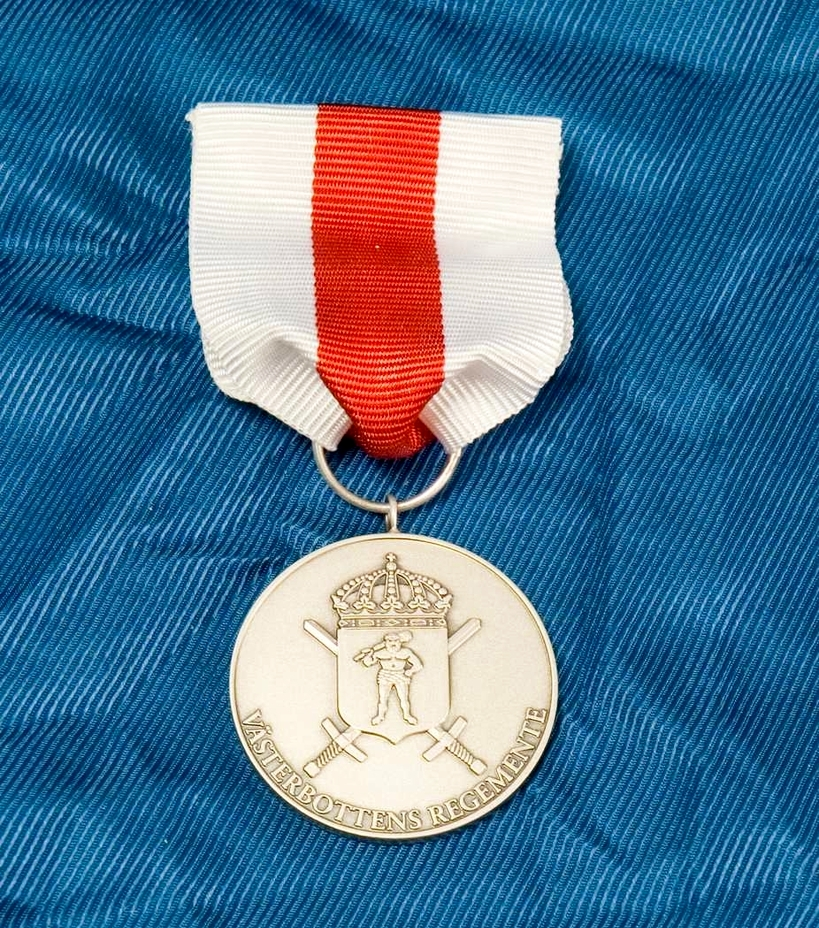
Västerbotten Regiment (I 20) Commemorative Medal

=== Heritage ===
After the regiment was disbanded on 30 June 2000, the colour and the regiment's traditions was passed on to Västerbotten Group (Västerbottensgruppen). From 1 July 2013, the traditions of the regiment will be kept by the Västerbotten Battalion, included in the Västerbotten Group.

=== Other ===
The regiment had several anniversaries, but the 3 February, however, was the one that was celebrated the longest, which commemorated the Battle of Fraustadt. Furthermore, anniversaries were held on 28 June, 4 July, 5 July, 8 July, 9 July, 14 July, 23 August, 31 August and 8 October. These were anniversaries of battles that which the regiment participated in. The 8 October, was the anniversary of the last united Swedish-Finnish army division's dissolution in Umeå in 1809.

The history of the Överstelöjtnantens kompani ("Lieutenant Colonel's Company") continues today through Kongl. Wästerbotten's Regemente ("Royal Västerbotten Regiment"), a historical reenactment of the Association of Interactive History (Föreningen interaktiv historia) in Sävar, seeking to revive the last battle on Swedish soil, as part of the Year 1809.

== Commanding officers ==
Regimental commander active from 1651 to 2000.

=== Commanders ===
- 1651–1657: Didrik von Cappellen
- 1658–1662: Günter von Rosenskans
- 1663–1666: Kristian Urne
- 1667–1671: Björn Svinhufvud
- 1673–1676: Jakob Stegman †
- 1676–1683: Evert Horn
- 1684–1694: Reinhold Johan von Fersen
- 1702–1710: Anders Lagercrona
- 1711–1717: Magnus Cronberg
- 1717–1723: Henrik Magnus von Buddenbrock
- 1723–1736: Carl Morath
- 1736–1741: Johan Bernhard Wiedemeijer
- 1743–1757: Georg Reinhold Palmstruch
- 1757–1770: Wilhelm Carpelan
- 1770–1779: Johan August Meijerfeldt
- 1779–1785: Wilhelm Mauritz Klingspor
- 1785–1791: Wilhelm Mauritz Pauli
- 1791–1800: Gustaf Gyllengranat
- 1800–1804: Otto Wrede
- 1804–1806: Eberhard von Vegesack
- 1805–1811: Johan Bergenstråhle
- 1812–1828: Lars Jacob von Knorring
- 1828–1837: Carl August von Hedenberg
- 1845–1850: Georg Gabriel Emil von Troil
- 1864–1868: Ernst von Vegesack
- 1874–1883: Anders Eberhard Svedelius
- 1883–1887: Elof von Boisman
- 1897–1901: Otto Ewert Mautitz
- 1901–1902: Carl Conrad Vogel
- 1902–1907: Johan Oscar Nestor
- 1907–1915: Gillis Bergenstråhle
- 1915–1921: Bengt Ribbing
- 1921–1928: Hugo Ankarcrona
- 1928–1932: Per Erlandsson
- 1933–1937: Carl Bennedich
- 1937–1941: Nils Rosenblad
- 1941–1947: Olof Sjöberg
- 1947–1952: Per Axel Holger Stenholm
- 1952–1952: Magnus Wilhelm af Klinteberg
- 1952–1959: Carol Bennedich
- 1959–1964: Åke H:son Söderbom
- 1964–1970: Allan Johan Magnus Månsson
- 1970–1971: Karl Iwan Eliseus
- 1971–1973: Dick Ernst Harald Löfgren
- 1973–1976: Sven Nils Anders Kruse de Verdier
- 1976–1981: Senior colonel Dick Ernst Harald Löfgren
- 1981–1983: Olof Gunnar Dackenberg
- 1983–1990: Erik Olof Forsgren
- 1990–1993: Jan Olof Lindström
- 1993–1999: Anders Kihl
- 1999–2000: Per-Ove Harry Eriksson

=== Deputy commanders ===
- 1980–1981: Colonel Olof Dackenberg

== Names, designations and locations ==
Name	Translation	From		To
Kungl. Västerbottens regemente	Royal Västerbotten Regiment	1624-??-??	–	1709-07-01
Kungl. Västerbottens regemente	Royal Västerbotten Regiment	1709-??-??	–	1829-12-11
Kungl. Västerbottens fältjägarregemente	Royal Västerbotten Ranger Regiment	1829-12-12	–	1841-??-??
Kungl. Västerbottens fältjägarkår	Royal Västerbotten Ranger Corps	1841-??-??	–	1892-12-11
Kungl. Västerbottens regemente	Royal Västerbotten Regiment	1892-12-12	–	1973-06-30
Kungl. Västerbottens regemente och försvarsområde	Royal Västerbotten Regiment and Defence District	1973-07-01	–	1974-12-31
Västerbottens regemente och försvarsområde	Västerbotten Regiment and Defence District	1975-01-01	–	2000-06-30
Avvecklingsorganisation	Decommissioning Organisation	2000-07-01	–	2000-12-31
Designation		From		To
№ 19		1816-10-01	–	1841-??-??
№ XIX		1841-??-??	–	1892-12-31
№ 20		1893-01-01	–	1914-09-30
I 20		1914-10-01	–	1973-06-30
I 20/Fo 61		1973-07-01	–	2000-06-30
Location		From		To
Gumboda hed		1649-??-??	–	1897-??-??
Vännäs läger		1898-??-??	–	1909-03-31
Umeå Garrison		1909-04-01	–	2000-12-31

== See also ==
- List of Swedish infantry regiments
