= Battle of Kumlinge =

1808 battle of the Finnish War

- Part of the Finnish War (Napoleonic Wars)
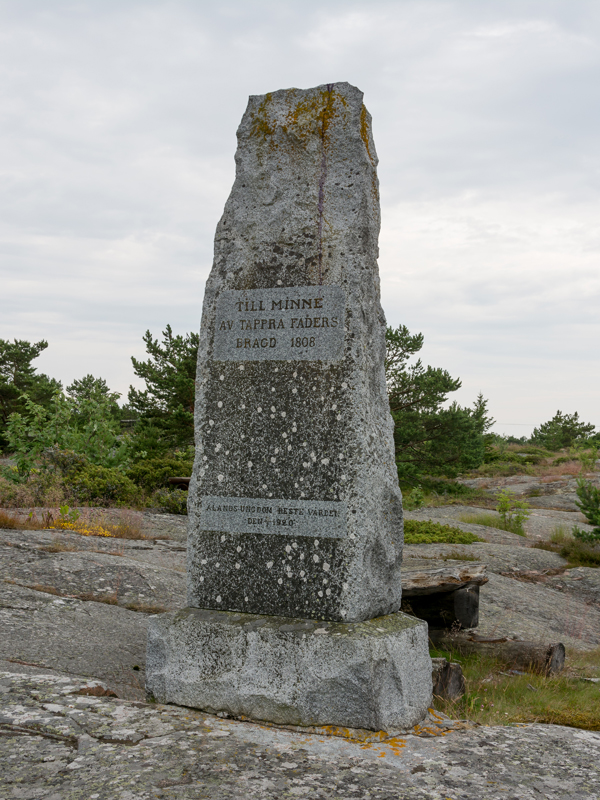
- Memorial stone over the battle
Date	9 or 10 May 1808
Location	Kumlinge, Åland in Finland
Result	Swedish victory

Belligerents
Sweden	Russian Empire

Commanders and leaders
Henrik Gummerus	(Russian Empire) Colonel Vuich

Strength
450 peasants	450 infantry

Casualties and losses
3 killed 3 wounded	1 killed 449 captured

The Battle of Kumlinge was the culmination of the Åland riots during the Finnish War, fought between Sweden and Russia. The riot started in the Sockenstuga at 19 March 1808 and spread all over Åland, to finally culminate at Kumlinge at 9 or 10 May. 450 armed peasants, led by Henrik Gummerus, defeated and captured the equally strong Russian force under Colonel Vuitsch at their headquarters, just outside the Kumlinge rectory. The peasants sustained three killed and three wounded, while the Russians had one killed and eight wounded. After Vuitsch's capitulation, only about 50 Russian soldiers remained on Brändö who likewise, after a brief engagement, were made prisoners; all of Åland had thus been saved from Russian occupation.

== Sources ==
- van Suchtelen, Paul (1835). Kriget emellan Sverige och Ryssland åren 1808 och 1809 (in Swedish). Stockholm: N. H. THOMSON.
- Schulman, Hugo (1909). Striden om Finland 1808-1809 (in Swedish). Borgå: Werner Söderström Osakeyhtiös.
- Westrin, Theodor (1922). Nordisk familjebok Uggleupplagan. 33. Väderlek - Äänekoski (in Swedish). Stockholm: Nordisk Familjeboks Förlags Akriebolag.
- Nordensvan, Carl Otto (1898). Finska kriget 1808-1809 (in Swedish). Stockholm: Albert Bonniers Förlag.
- "1808-1809 dokument om Finland i krig", Arkistolaitos (in Swedish), Arkivverket
