= Battle of Nykarleby =

1808 battle of the Finnish War

- Part of the Finnish War
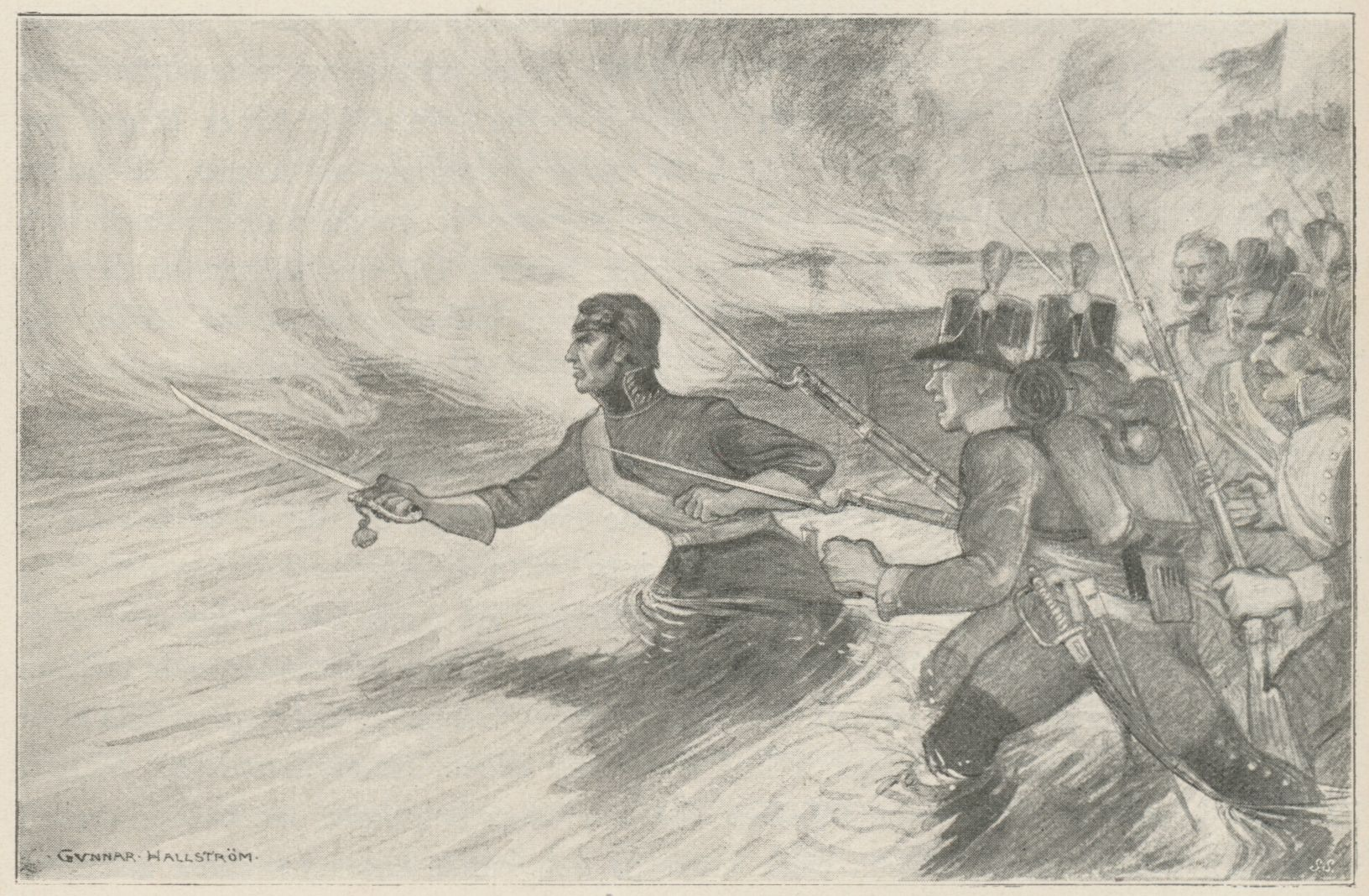
- Döbeln i striden vid Ny Karleby, by Gunnar Hallström
| Date | 24 June 1808 |
| Location | Nykarleby, Ostrobothnia, Finland |
| Result | Swedish victory |

Belligerents
| Sweden | Russian Empire |

Commanders and leaders
| Carl Johan Adlercreutz | (Russian Empire) Ivan Fedorovich Yankovich de Mirievo |

Strength
| Unknown | 1,300 |

Casualties and losses
| 1 killed 3 wounded | 70 killed, wounded and captured |

The Battle of Nykarleby was fought between Sweden and the Russian Empire during the Finnish War of 1808–1809.

When Carl Johan Adlercreutz continued his summer offensive, he saw an excellent opportunity to encircle the Russian main army at the town of Nykarleby. The Swedish offensive began on Midsummer's Eve, but the Russian forces had already evacuated the city and pulled back to Vaasa, where another Swedish force, commanded by Johan Bergenstråhle was landing.

Adlercreutz engaged several smaller Russian units who were guarding the Russian retreat. The Russians were led by Jankovitch. He pulled back over the bridge in the town centre, and then burned the bridge. On the way to Vaasa they encountered a smaller Swedish unit led by Major Carl von Otter and a small battle ensued. The Swedes decided to stop in Nykarleby to celebrate Midsummer while the Russian troops were retreating. The inhabitants generously offered food and drinks to the Swedish army.

Legend says that Georg Carl von Döbeln, who was marching in front of the Pori Regiment, became so angry when he saw the Russians retreat after having burned the bridge, and that the surprise attack had failed, that he ran out in the river, loyally followed by his regiment. He had then been close to drowning and his men had to rescue him. The battle of Nykarleby was to become a relatively bloodless battle.

The Swedes won a small victory at Nykarleby, but the ensuing festivities delayed the march to the south in such a manner that they could not support the Swedish landing force in Vaasa.

== Citations and sources ==
=== Sources ===
- Hornborg, Eirik (1955). När riket sprängdes: fälttågen i Finland och Västerbotten, 1808-1809 (in Swedish). Stockholm: P. A. Norstedts och Söners Förlag.

=== External links ===
- Battle of Nykarleby. Comprehensive description by C-B. J. Petander.
