= Battle of Ruona–Salmi =

1808 battle of the Finnish War

Coordinates: 62.8453°N 23.4881°E

- Part of the Finnish War
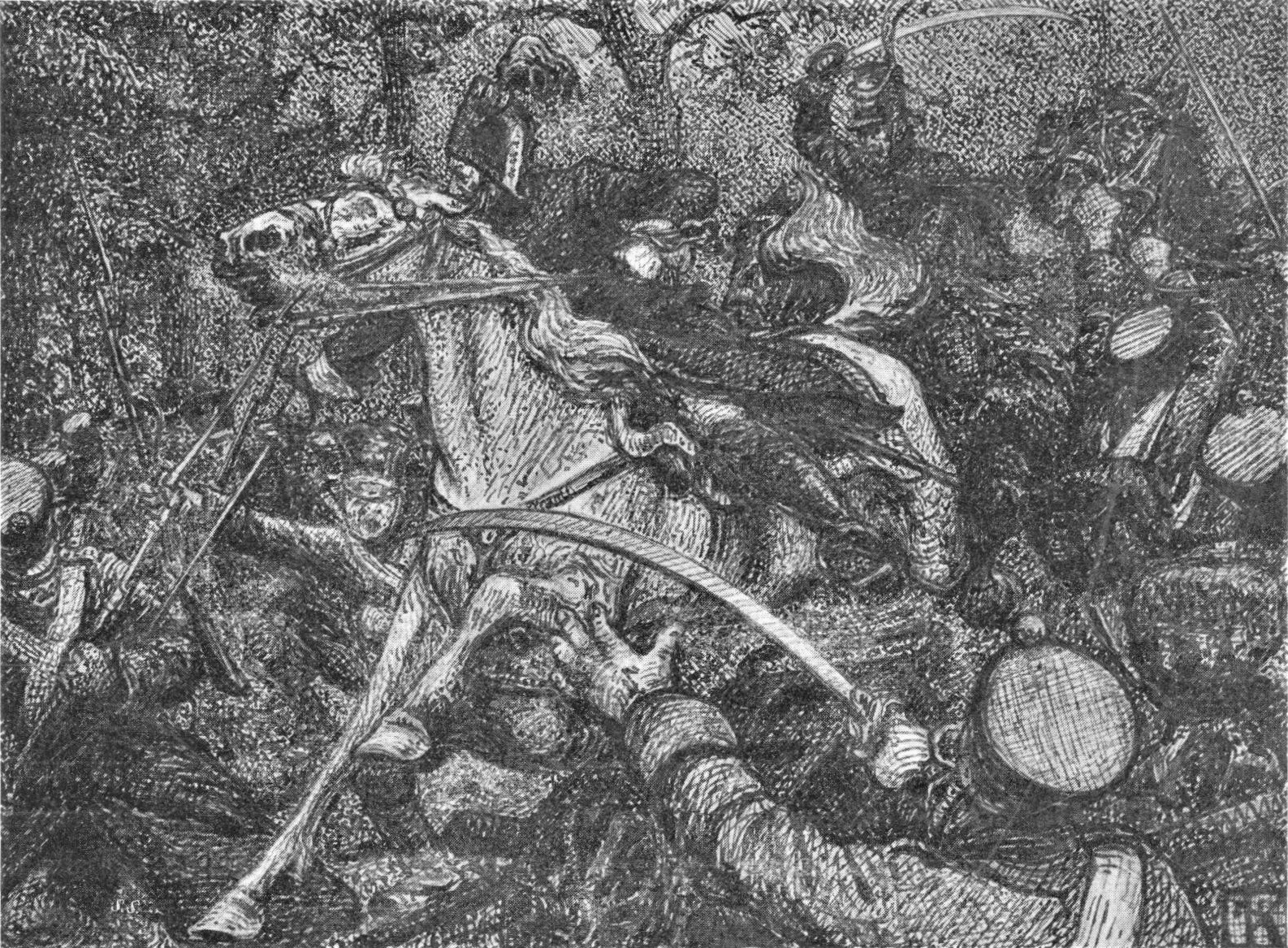
- Adlercreutz i striden vid Salmi, by Nils Kreuger
Date	1–2 September 1808
Location	Ruona and Salmi, Kuortane, Finland
Result	• Swedish victory at Ruona; • Russian victory at Salmi

Belligerents
Sweden	Russian Empire

Commanders and leaders
Wilhelm Mauritz Klingspor; Carl Johan Adlercreutz	(Russian Empire) Nikolay Mikhailovich Kamensky

Strength
Swedish accounts: 4,700–5,500 (3,400–3,500 engaged) Russian accounts: 8,000–12,000 (including 5,000 militia); 30 guns	Russian accounts: 9,000–11,000 (7,000 engaged); 58 guns

Casualties and losses
Swedish accounts: 680–900 Russian accounts: 1,000–1,500	Russian accounts: 845–1,000 Swedish accounts: 1,200

The battle of Ruona–Salmi or the battle of Kuortane was fought between Swedish and Russian troops on 1–2 September 1808 at Ruona and Salmi, Kuortane. The Swedish army was led by Wilhelm Mauritz Klingspor with 4,700, 5,000, or 5,500 men under his command (according to Russian sources, there were 8,000 Swedes or 7,000 regular soldiers and 5,000 irregular) against the Russian army of between 9,000 and 11,000 men under the command of Nikolay Kamensky. The battle turned up to be a major engagement in the war where fierce artillery fire occurred from both sides. Kamensky, advancing from Alanus, beat back the Swedish barriers and on 31 August approached the Swedish army's position near Kuortane.

Kamensky, having sent detachments under the command of Colonel Vlastov and Major general Kazachkovsky to bypass the enemy's flanks, attacked the Swedish troops on September 1 from the front by the vanguard of Russian troops under the command of Colonel Kulnev, and then by the detachment of Major general Raevsky. Despite the fierce and stubborn fight, which was held with varying success, the Swedes could not be pushed out from their positions. Meanwhile, detachments of Vlastov and Kazachkovsky bypassed the Swedish position and Klingspor, fearing being surrounded, in the night of September 2 retreated to the rear off Salmi village. In the morning Kulnev's 4,000 strong detachment defeated the Swedish rearguard and attacked the main Swedish positions from the front, while Kazachkovsky's detachment attacked from the rear. The enemy, pursued by Russian hussars, retreated in disarray to the north-west towards the town of Vaasa, unable to withstand the assault.

The Swedes, who were in a well-fortified position, lost 170 killed, 400 wounded and 110 captured according to the reports of regimental losses, in addition to more than 300 men who had fallen ill. Other Swedish sources gives 900 losses. Russian assessment suggests that Swedes lost up to 1,500 men. The Russians lost 128 killed, 648 wounded and 51 captured (excluding 18 officers), according to their own estimates. According to Russian general Paul van Suchtelen, the losses reached almost 2,000 in total, with an equal amount on both sides. This battle is considered one of the turning points in the Finnish War along with the battle of Oravais.

== Citations and sources ==
=== Sources ===
- Hornborg, Eirik (1955). När riket sprängdes: fälttågen i Finland och Västerbotten, 1808-1809 (in Swedish). Stockholm: P. A. Norstedts och Söners Förlag.
- Velichko, Konstantin; Novitsky, Vasily; Schwartz, Alexey von; Apushkin, Vladimir; Schoultz, Gustav von (1915). Военная энциклопедия Сытина [Sytin Military Encyclopedia] (in Russian). Vol. XIV: Круковский – Линта. Moscow: Типография Т-ва И. Д. Сытина. pp. 399–400.
- Yermolov, A. Y. (2016). "КУОРТАНСКОЕ СРАЖЕНИЕ 1808". Great Russian Encyclopedia. Electronic version.
- Schulman, Hugo (1909). Striden om Finland 1808-1809 (in Swedish). Borgå: Werner Söderström Osakeyhtiö.
- Montgomery, Gustaf (1842). Historia öfver kriget emellan Sverige och Ryssland: åren 1808 och 1809. 2, Sednare delen (in Swedish). Örebro: Lindh.
- Danielson-Kalmari, Johan Richard (1897). Finska kriget och Finlands krigare 1808-1809 (in Swedish). Helsinki: Osakeyhtiö Weilin & Göös Aktiebolag.
- van Suchtelen, Paul (1854). Narrative of the Conquest of Finland by the Russians in the Years 1808-9. Translated by Monteith, William. London: Lionel Booth.
