= Battle of Grönvikssund =

1808 battle of the Finnish War

- Part of the Finnish War
Date	30 August 1808
Location	Finnish archipelago, near Kustavi
Result	Swedish victory

Belligerents
Sweden	Russian Empire

Commanders and leaders
Johan Ludvig Brant; Sölfverarm; Carl Ulrik af Klercker	Selivanov; Myakin

Strength
35 gun sloops	20 gun sloops 4 gun yawls

Casualties and losses
2 ships sunk 225 killed or wounded	9 ships sunk 114 killed or wounded (incomplete)

The Battle of Grönvikssund was fought between Sweden and Russia during the Finnish War 1808–09.

== Battle ==
Johan Ludvig Brant was tasked with defeating Russian coastal forces operating near Nystad (fi. Uusikaupunki). When he learned that roughly twenty Russian gun sloops or yawls had sailed from Nystad towards Turku he started chasing them. Swedish naval unit caught up with the Russians who upon noticing the approaching Swedes formed for battle. Swedish numerical superiority allowed them to attempt flanking maneuver around the island dominating the battle area, however Russians noticed it and managed to block the flankers.

As flanking had failed approached Swedish to close range however though outnumbered Russian force made fierce resistance and withdrew only slowly while maintaining unit cohesion. When he was running out of ammo Selivanoff had to order retreat at 19:00 when most of his ships had already been shot full of holes. Swedes gave chase to the retreating Russians but failed to catch them before nightfall and turned back.

Numerical superiority and favorable wind were important factors contributing to the Swedish victory. However Swedes' decision to avoid boarding actions probably saved Russians from even greater losses. Swedish victory forced Russians to postpone their plans for attacking Åland and instead of forming a landing force Russian coastal forces were used to protect supply convoys.

== Bibliography ==
- Mattila, Tapani (1983). Meri maamme turvana [Sea protecting our country] (in Finnish). Jyväskylä: K. J. Gummerus Osakeyhtiö. ISBN 951-99487-0-8.
- Hornborg, Eirik (1955). När riket sprängdes: fälttågen i Finland och Västerbotten, 1808-1809 (in Swedish). Stockholm: P. A. Norstedts och Söners Förlag.
