= Battle of Kauhajoki =

1808 battle of the Finnish War

- Part of the Finnish War
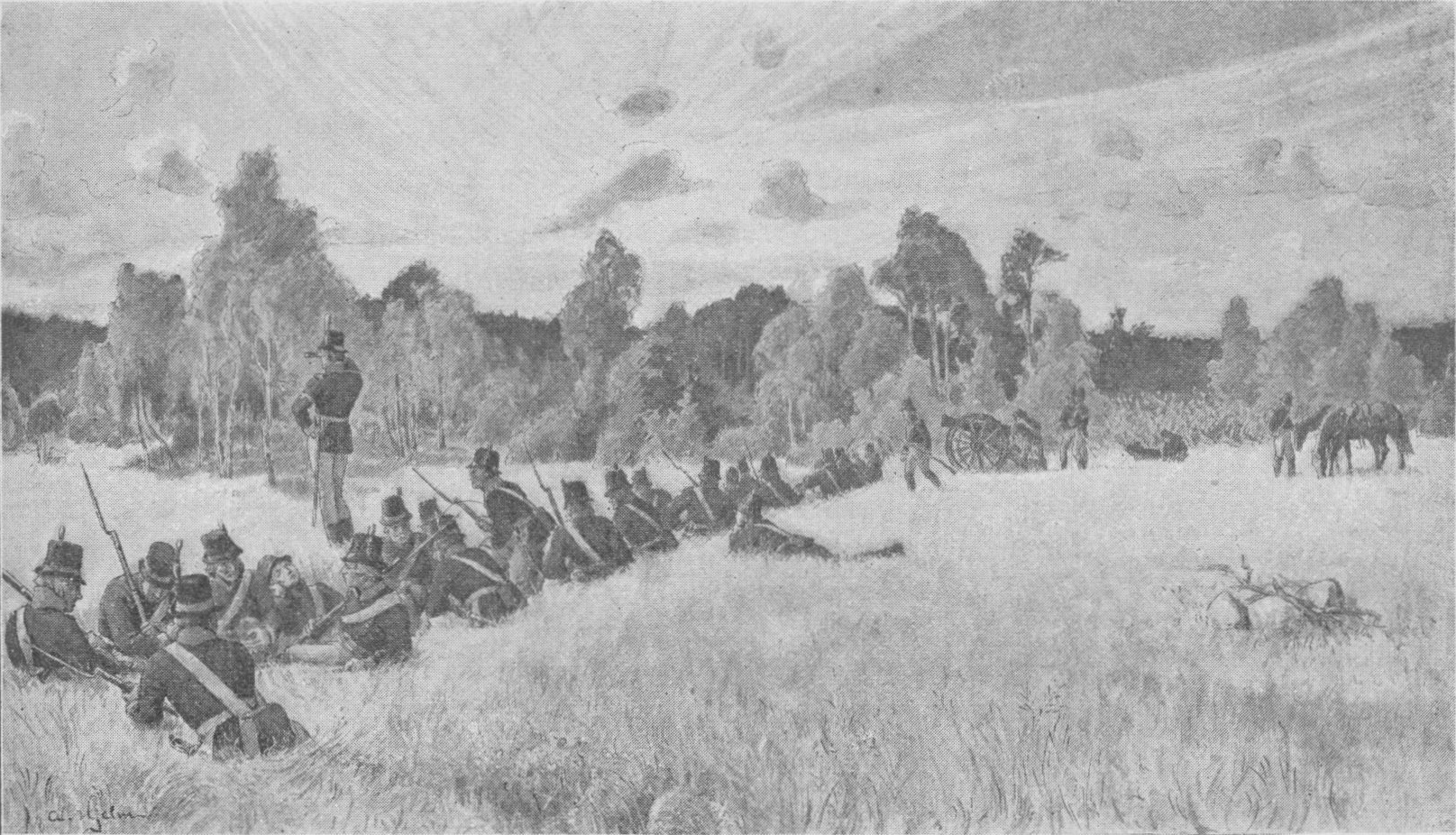
- I ställningen vid Kauhajoki, by Axel Hjelm
Date	10 August 1808
Location	Kauhajoki, South Ostrobothnia, Finland 62°24′50″N 22°10′20″E
Result	Swedish victory

Belligerents
Sweden	Russian Empire

Commanders and leaders
Georg Carl von Döbeln	(Russian Empire) Dmitri Dmitriyevich Shepelev

Strength
2,250	1,150

Casualties and losses
67 killed, wounded or captured	200 killed, wounded or captured
- Location within South Ostrobothnia Battle of Kauhajoki (Finland) Battle of Kauhajoki (European Russia)

The Battle of Kauhajoki was fought between Swedish and Russian troops on August 10, 1808.

== History ==
After the important Swedish victory at the Battle of Lapua the force under the command of Georg Carl von Döbeln defeated a Russian force near Kauhajoki, South Ostrobothnia, Finland.

== Sources ==
- Hornborg, Eirik (1955). När riket sprängdes: fälttågen i Finland och Västerbotten, 1808–1809 (in Swedish). Stockholm: P. A. Norstedts och Söners Förlag.
