= Otto von Fieandt =

Swedish army officer

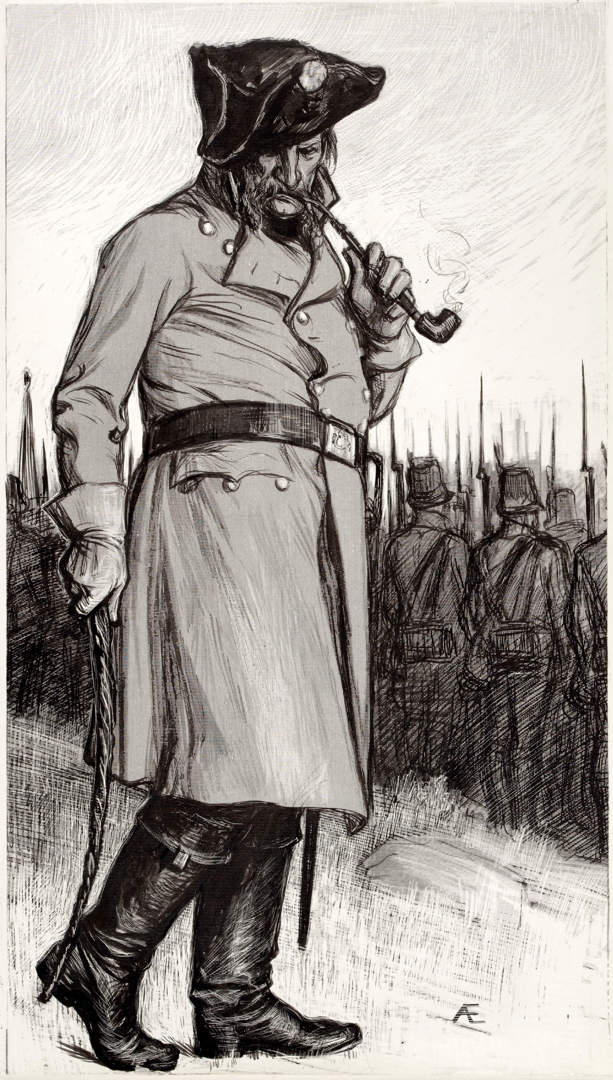
Depiction of Fieandt, c. 1900

Henrik Otto von Fieandt (1762–1823) was a Swedish colonel who fought in the Russo-Swedish War. He appears in Johan Ludvig Runeberg's epic poem The Tales of Ensign Stål as an eccentric but valorous commander.

== Life ==
Otto von Fieandt was born into a military family in 1762. His father was a Lieutenant in the Swedish Savolax musketeer regiment. By the time of the Russo-Swedish War of 1788 he was captain of a regiment, and participated in the Anjala conspiracy, for which he was pardoned. He came to fame in the Finnish War, in which he held the rank of lieutenant colonel. After the war he remained in Finland. He died in 1823 on an estate near Vyborg.

== In literature ==
Von Fieandt is the titular character of the tenth poem comprising The Tales of Ensign Stål. Runeberg paints him as an eccentric figure, stating that he spoke Finnish to his men, that he used a whip instead of a sword, and that he went into battle smoking a pipe.

A monument known as the "Stones of Otto von Fieandt" stands in Karstula in commemoration of the Battle of Karstula, in which his Swedish forces were forced to retreat.
