= Battle of Rimito Kramp =

1808 battle of the Finnish War

- Part of the Finnish War
Date	30 June – 2 July 1808
Location	Finnish archipelago, southern end of Airisto
Result	See aftermath

Belligerents
Sweden	Russian Empire

Commanders and leaders
Klas Hjelmstjerna	Selivanov; Myakin

Strength
4 galleys 15 gun sloops 4 sloops Reinforcements: 4 galleys	4 gun sloops 3 gun yawls Reinforcements: 5 gun sloops

Casualties and losses
1 gun sloop sunk 2 gun sloops damaged	2 gun yawls damaged

The Battle of Rimito Kramp was fought between Sweden and Russia during the Finnish War 1808–09.

== Battle ==
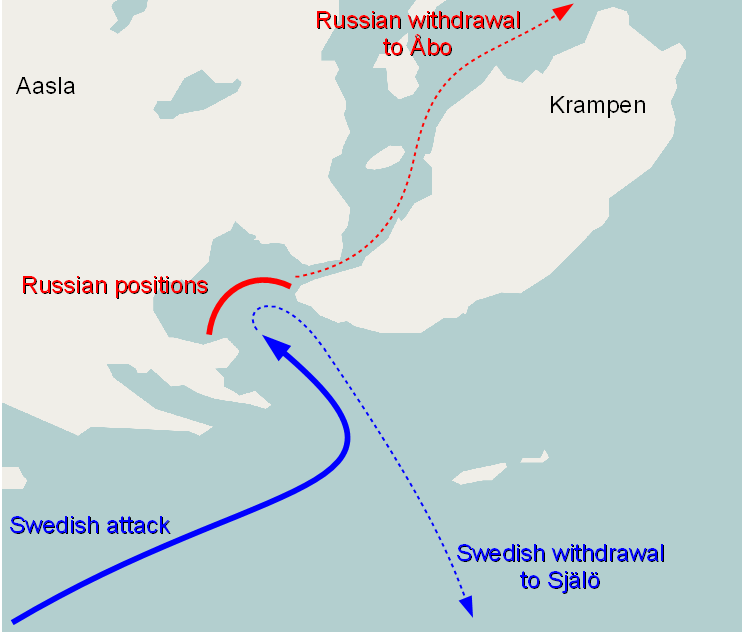
Battle of Rimito Kramp

Swedish naval unit under Hjelmstjerna was tasked with destroying the Russian coastal fleet unit that had successfully bypassed the Swedish blockade of Hanko. After learning that a small Russian gun sloop unit had moved to relatively vulnerable position at the southern end of Airisto region Hjelmstjerna made the decision to attack.

Russian position at the small bay at Rimito Kramp was however strong with all the boats positioned so that they would create crossfire at the mouth of the bay. In addition to the Swedish problems the wind was blowing against them, though not as critical as with sailing ships it prevented Swedish ships from accurately aiming their guns.

Russians were reinforced during the night and Swedes expecting Russians to attack chose to wait as well. Later during the second day Swedish reinforcements arrived and Hjelmstjerna planned to launch his renewed attack during the night using galleys and their greater crew complements to overpower the smaller Russian vessels.

While preparing for the attack Hjelmstjerna neglected to guard the narrow passage that led from Rimito Kramp towards Turku. During the night little before planned Swedish attack the Russians fled to Turku where they were further reinforced in addition to being supported by three 24-pounder artillery batteries. Though Swedes had forced the Russians with retreat they had failed to inflict defeat to the Russian coastal forces.

== Aftermath ==
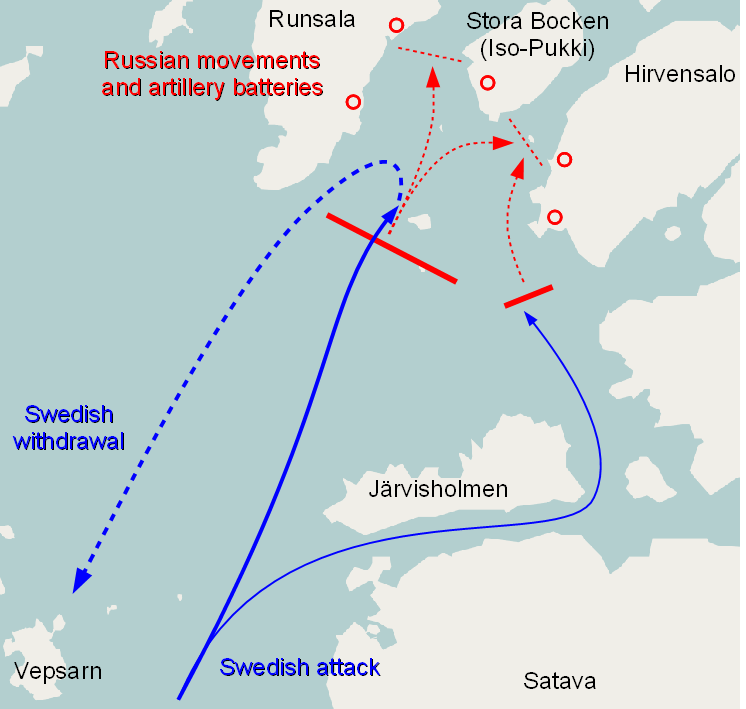
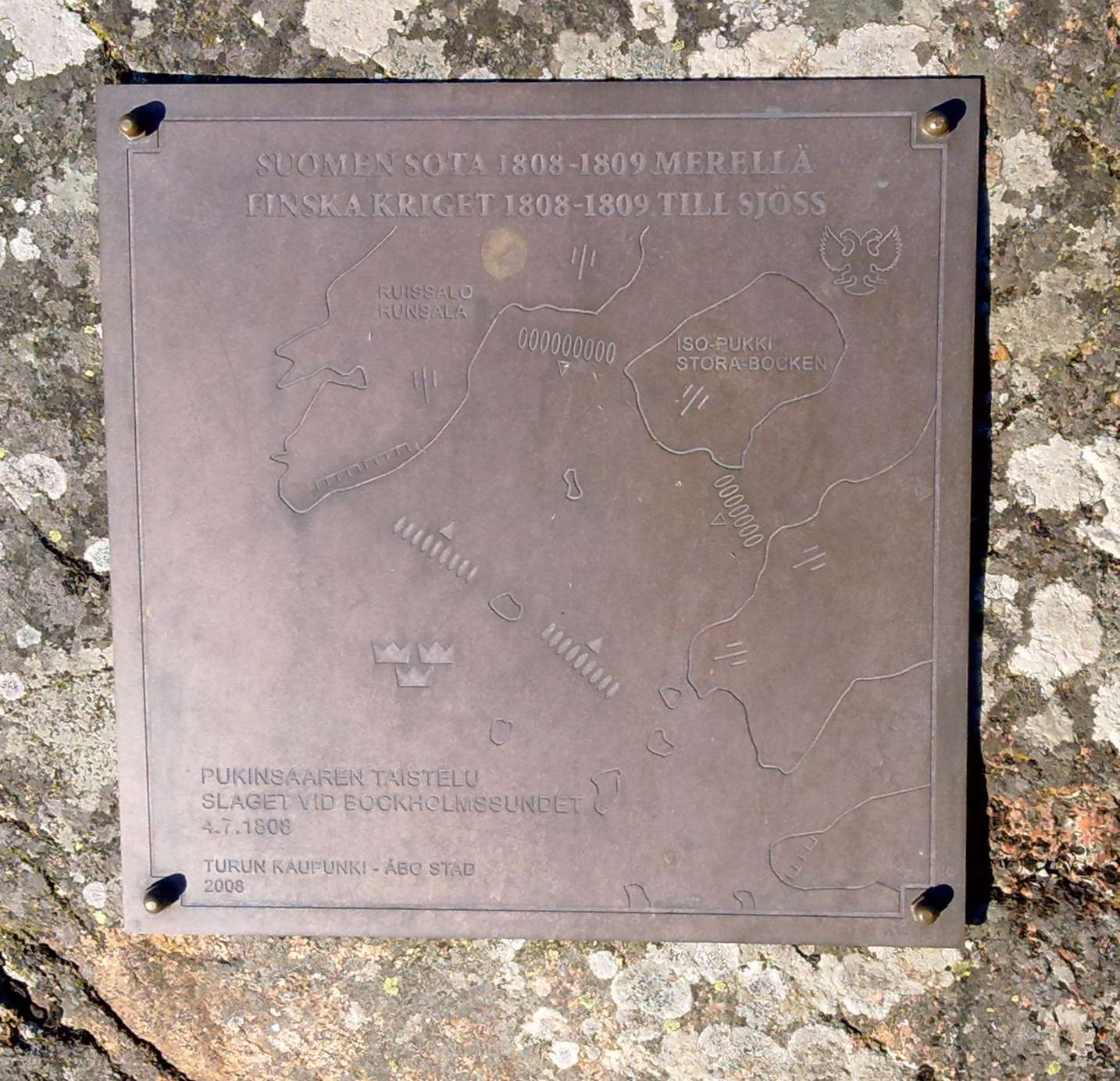
Map and commemorative plaque of the Battle of Bockholmssund

Being disappointed to the failures at naval front Gustav IV Adolf chose to personally oversee the actions taken against Russians. He arrived on 4 July to the Hjelmstjerna's naval unit near Turku with Vice Admiral Rajalin with intent to attack against Russians as soon as possible to prevent Russian naval forces from linking up.

Swedish forces mounted an attack (also known as Battle of Pukkisaari or Battle of Bockholmssund) against Russians towards Turku while Russians under command of Lieutenant General P.K. Konovnitsin formed line from their gun sloops and gun yawls between islands of Ruissalo and Hirvensalo (60.412°N 22.137°E) under cover of the artillery batteries. Detachments or Russian infantry - sharpshooters - were deployed on the shores of islands of Ruissalo and Hirvensalo. Battle which started at 18:00 lasted until the midnight. Though Russian line had bent Swedes were unable to breach it. Battle ended without a clear winner with 11 Russian ships damaged and most of the Swedish ships damaged.

== Bibliography ==
- Mattila, Tapani (1983). Meri maamme turvana [Sea protecting our country] (in Finnish). Jyväskylä: K. J. Gummerus Osakeyhtiö. ISBN 951-99487-0-8.
- Hans Norman, Historiska media: Skärgårdsflottan
