= Battle of Pälkjärvi =

1808 battle of the Finnish War

- Part of the Finnish War
Date	10 August 1808
Location	Pälkjärvi, Finland, Kingdom of Sweden (now Russia)
Result	Swedish victory

Belligerents
Sweden	Russian Empire

Commanders and leaders
Karl Wilhelm Malm	(Russian Empire) Ilya Alekseyev

Strength
650; 2 guns	1,300

Casualties and losses
55 killed or wounded	144 killed, wounded or captured

The Battle of Pälkjärvi was fought between Swedish and Russian forces at the municipality of Pälkjärvi in present-day Russia on 10 August 1808 during the Finnish War. The Swedes launched a night attack, and Ilya Alekseyev, the Russian commander, discovered the danger of his position, being surrounded, and under Swedish pressure sounded the retreat, having managed to break out of the encirclement thanks to the size of his detachment.

== Background ==
As a result of the Battle of Kuopio and the Swedish offensive into Savonia, a significant amount of Russian troops had been tied up in the fight against Johan August Sandels and his 5th Swedish brigade; On 12 June the Swedes counted not fully 2,000 men while the Russians numbered 8,000 under Michael Andreas Barclay de Tolly. The disparity in numbers eventually forced the Swedes to abandon Kuopio on 18 June and withdraw to Toivala, but not without harassing the Russians with guerrilla warfare; on 25 June Sandels commenced a feint attack towards Kuopio while Karl Wilhelm Malm and Joachim Zachris Duncker captured a large Russian convoy between Leppävirta and Kuopio — the whole operation had cost the Swedes 29 killed or wounded while the Russians had lost, in addition to the convoy, more than 82 men. The strategic effect which followed forced several thousand Russian troops which had marched out from Kuopio to reinforce the main army to the west, to return to Kuopio, against the orders of Fyodor Buxhoeveden. Another Swedish offensive against Kuopio took place on 1 July, which, although ending in an operational failure, resulted in 211 Russian casualties to only 83 Swedes.

== Battle ==
In mid-July, Barclay de Tolly resigned his command for health reasons, it was passed over to Nikolay Tuchkov; He immediately ordered the reinforcements, which had been unable to leave due to the increased Swedish activity, to proceed west — even without these troops the Russians enjoyed a three to one numerical advantage. However, recent Swedish successes had sparked a peasant uprising against the Russians, which forced Generalmajor Ilya Alekseyev (Alexejev) to give up an attempt to attack the Swedish left flank, and instead retreat all the way to Pälkjärvi, where he awaited reinforcements. Upon hearing news of his retreat, Sandels sent a Swedish force under Malm to pursue and defeat him before the arrival of Russian reinforcements.

Malm's force consisted of 250 regular troops with two guns along with 400 armed peasants who had also joined him. He estimated Alexeyev's force to 500 cavalry and four companies of Jägers — in reality, and unbeknownst to Malm, the Russians had already received reinforcements and numbered twice the number of his own force, although lacking in guns. On the night to 10 August, Malm attacked Alexeyev's force which was deployed around the Pälkjärvi church; he commenced to a frontal assault with the bulk of his forces (200 regulars and an equal number of peasants, with the artillery) while the rest encircled the Russian left flank. Alexeyev managed to halt the first main Swedish attack, but soon, after realizing that he was being encircled combined with renewed frontal attacks, ordered a retreat; he managed to break through the encirclement with relative ease, mostly due to the size of his army. At 9 p.m. the fighting stopped, Alexeyev retreated to Sortavala, briefly pursued by Malm who soon returned to Joensuu. The Swedes had lost 55 in killed or wounded, of which 24 peasants. The Russians had sustained one officer and 90 privates killed or wounded while 53 men were captured.

== Aftermath ==
Alexeyev, who feared a Swedish follow-up on Sortavala, requested reinforcements which he received from the army at Kuopio; although he was soon replaced by Mikhail Petrovich Dolgorukov, who advanced towards the Swedish positions at Toivala only after Sandels had recalled his forward contingents by mid-September. On 29 September Dolgorukov stood at Jännevirta, threatening the left flank of the Swedish positions at Toivala; Sandels, however, upon hearing the news of the Swedish defeats at Karstula and Ruona–Salmi, combined with the threat at his left flank, ordered a retreat towards Koljonvirta, near Iisalmi. Tuchkov occupied Toivala by 30 September. The armistice at Lohteå, which was signed on 3 October, further confirmed the Swedish setbacks to the west. Sandels and Tuchkov would encounter each other again at the Battle of Koljonvirta, on 27 October.

=== Swedish forces ===
- Savolax Jäger Regiment (1 company)
- Uleåborg Infantry Regiment (1 company)
- 400 armed peasants
- Savolax Artillery Brigade (2 guns)

In total: 650 men and 2 guns

== Citations and sources ==
=== Sources ===
- Hornborg, Eirik (1955). När riket sprängdes: fälttågen i Finland och Västerbotten, 1808-1809 (in Swedish). Stockholm: P. A. Norstedts och Söners Förlag.
