= Joachim Zachris Duncker =

Swedish soldier (1774–1809)

Lieutenant colonel Joachim Zachris Duncker
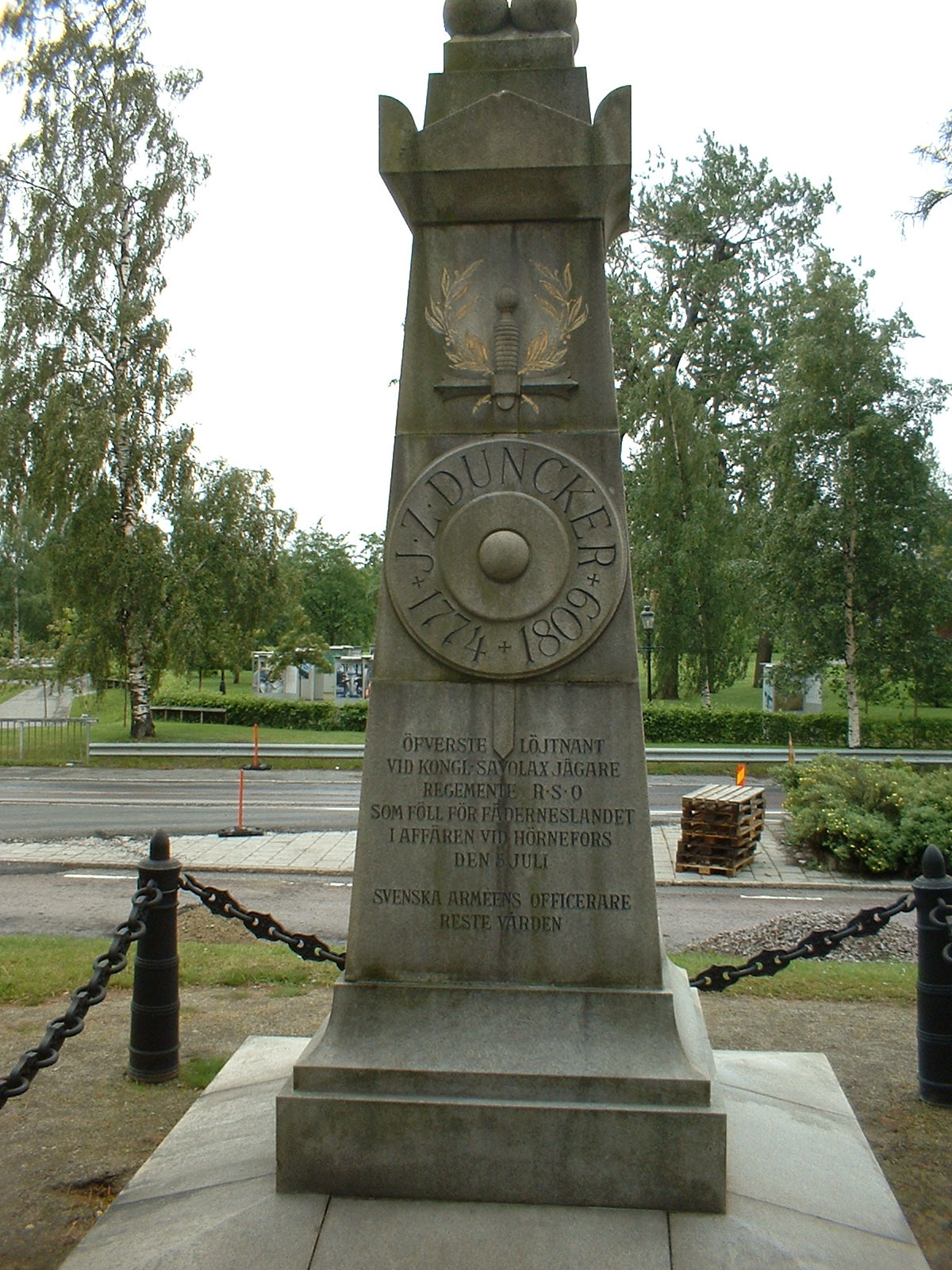
- Duncker's memorial monument in Umeå, Sweden
- Born: 12 November 1774; Ristiina, Savonia, Finland
- Died: 5 July 1809 (aged 34); Hörnefors, Sweden
- Military career
- Allegiance: Sweden
- Branch: Swedish Army
- Service years: 1789–1809
- Rank: Lieutenant colonel
- Conflicts: Russo-Swedish War (1788–1790); Finnish War; Battle of Pulkkila; Battle of Koljonvirta

Joachim Zachris Duncker (12 November 1774 – 6 July 1809) was a Swedish soldier born in Ristiina in Savonia.

In 1789 Duncker obtained the rank of 2nd Lieutenant in the Savonia ranger regiment. He fought in the 1790 war against Russia and proved his valor at the Battle of Perttimäki 19 May. In 1804 Duncker was promoted to captain.

During the Finnish War of 1808-1809 he distinguished himself as a brave and prominent officer. When Cronstedt's army retreated from Mikkeli to Iisalmi and Oulu through Leppävirta (March 1808), Duncker commanded the army's rearguard. During the Battle of Pulkkila (2 May 1808) he distinguished himself so well that Johan August Sandels gave him the honorary assignment to bring the news of the victory to the Swedish king. Shortly after, he was promoted to Major. In June 1808 he captured a large transport of supplies to the Russians. During the Battle of Koljonvirta (27 October 1808), Duncker together with Colonel Fahlander and Major Malm and only 600 men helped Sandels to utterly defeated a superior Russian force. In 1809 Duncker fought the Russians in the Swedish province of Västerbotten, and was promoted to Lieutenant-Colonel. During the Battle of Hörnefors (5 July 1809) Duncker commanded the Swedish rearguard and received fatal wounds and died in the Russian encampment the day after.

Duncker was buried next to Umeå church by the Russians that gave him a full honour guard. He lies buried together with a Russian cossack chief. In 1897 a memorial was erected on the spot where the grave was assumed to be.

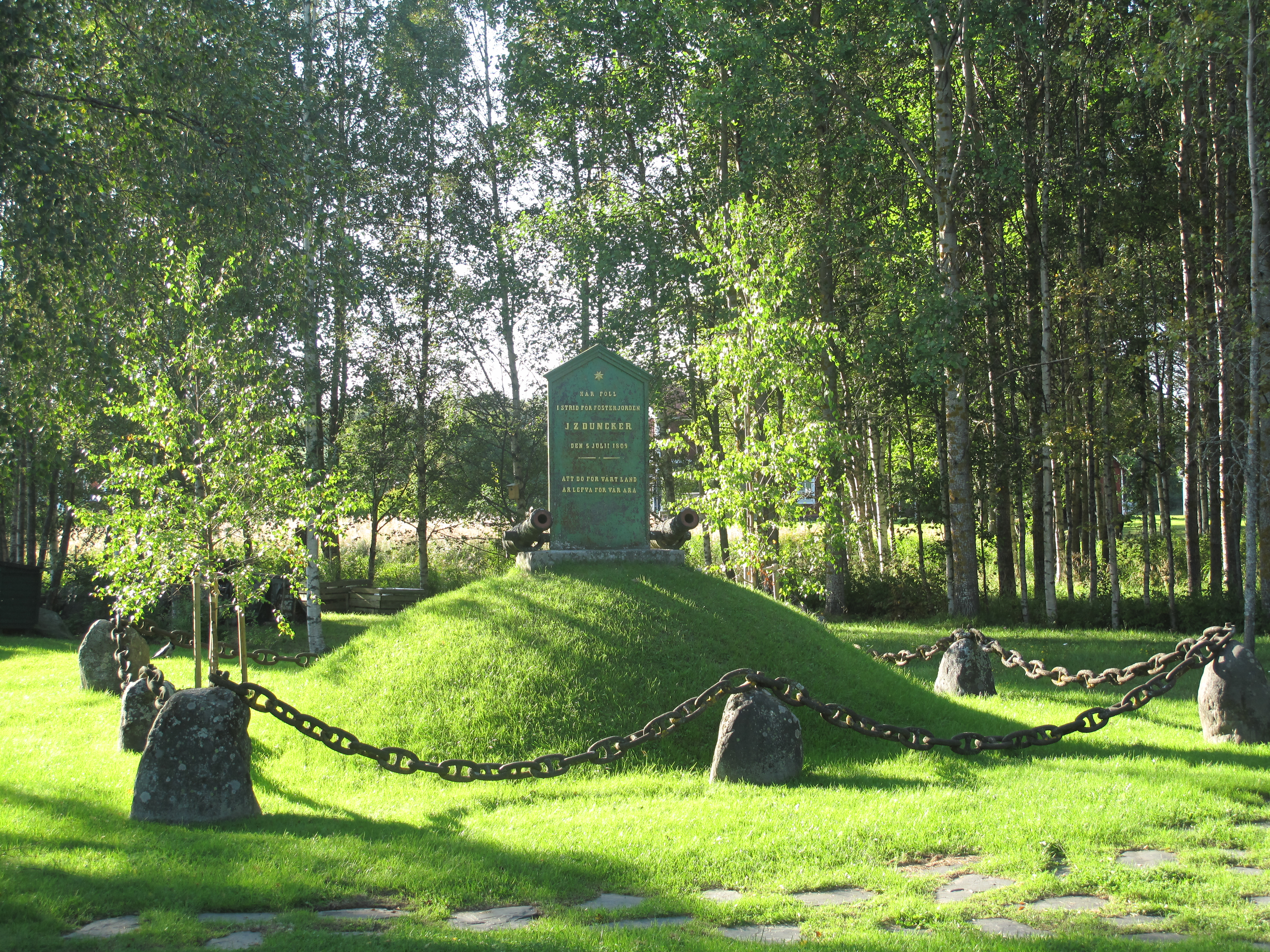
Duncker's monument at Hörnefors.

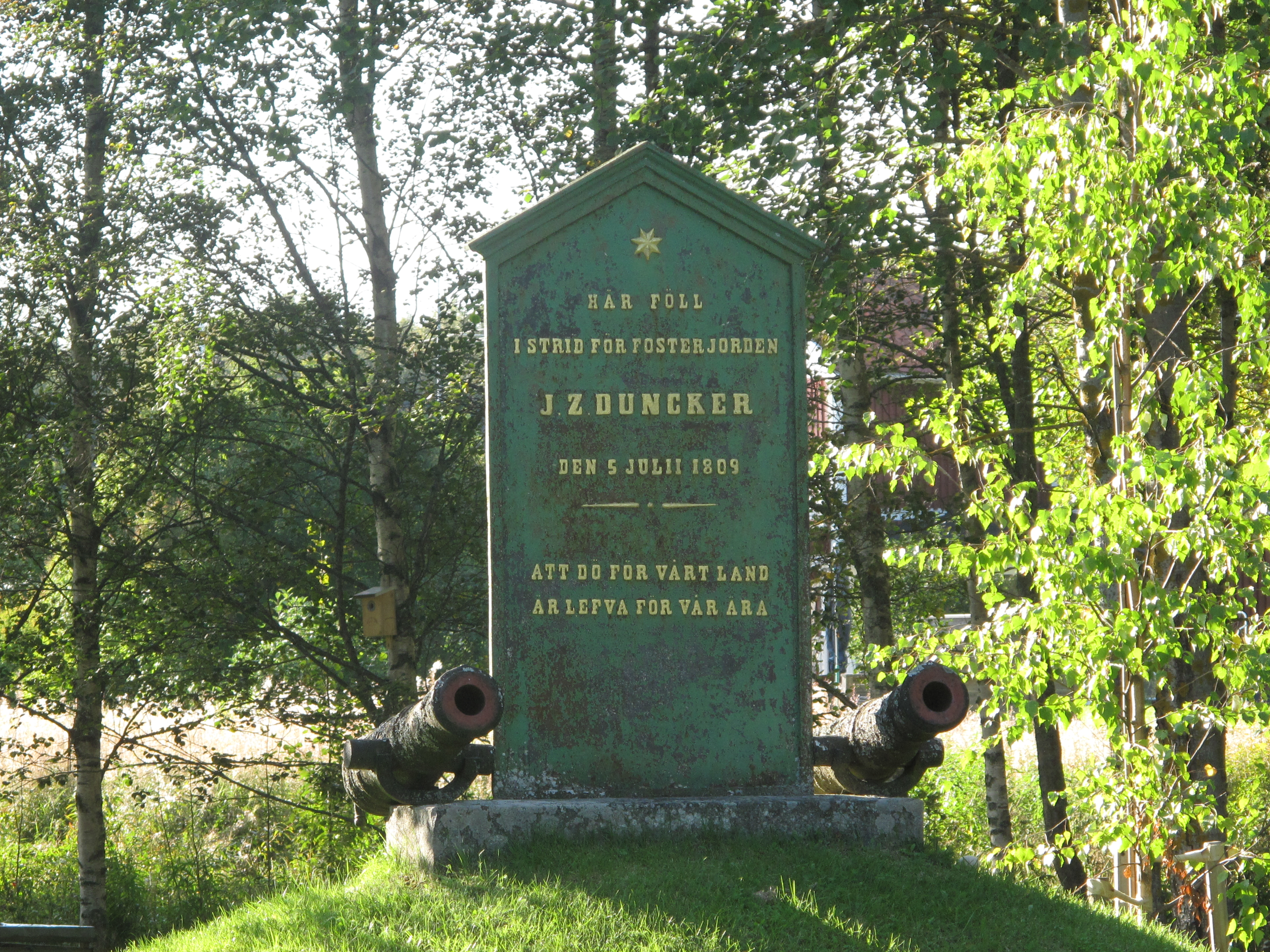
Duncker's monument at Hörnefors.

== Bibliography ==
- Duncker och Savolaxbrigaden by Bertil Nelsson; 2000–01; ISBN 978-91-88930-81-1
