= Battle of Hörnefors =

1809 battle of the Finnish War

- Part of the Finnish War (Napoleonic Wars)
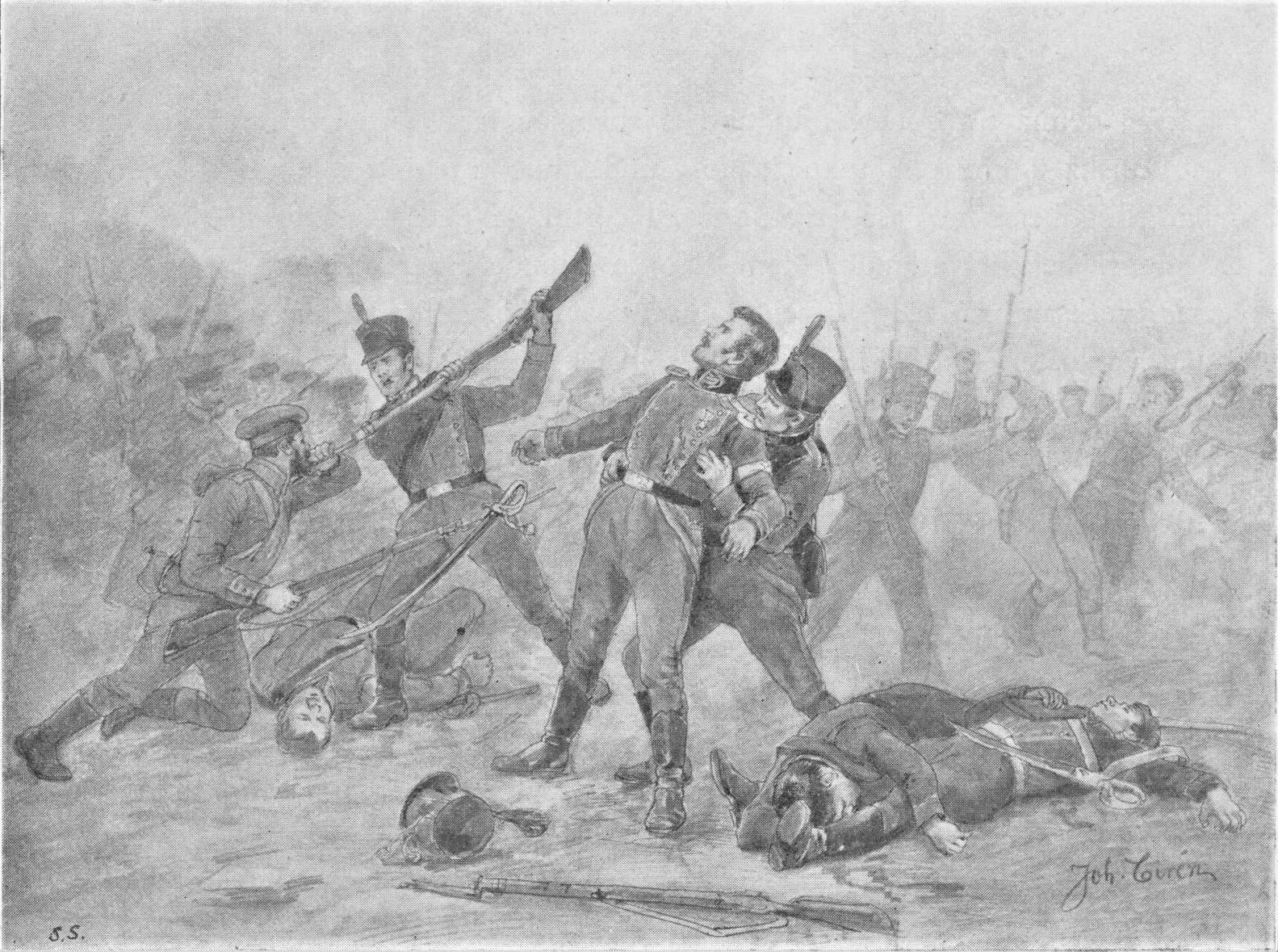
- Duncker såras i striden vid Hörnefors, by Johan Tirén
Date	5 July 1809
Location	Hörnefors, Sweden 63°37′27″N 19°54′43″E
Result	Russian victory

Belligerents
Sweden	Russian Empire

Commanders and leaders
Johan August Sandels; Joachim Zachris Duncker (DOW)	(Russian Empire) Ilya Alekseyev (Russian Empire) Pavel Shuvalov

Strength
2,400; 8 guns	3,350; 4 guns

Casualties and losses
167	188
- Location within Sweden Battle of Hörnefors (Europe)

The Battle of Hörnefors took place during the Finnish War, on 5 July 1809, when 2,400 Swedes under Johan August Sandels went on a counter-offensive against 3,350 Russians under Ilya Alekseyev and Pavel Shuvalov, at Hörnefors, Sweden. After more than two hours of intense fighting along the Hörnån (river) Sandels ordered a retreat, after having been misinformed of a greater Russian flanking attack.

== Background ==
After the Battle of Skellefteå and the subsequent Russian capture of Umeå, on 1 June, Johan August Sandels seized the command of the forces around Umeå, from Georg Carl von Döbeln. The situation for his troops, which counted about 1,450 men since Skellefteå, was at first uncertain. A Russian flanking maneuver through the Swedish countryside could prove devastating to his division, while a retreat south would be in danger of being cut-off by Russian coastal landings; as the Swedish fleet arrived at the Gulf of Bothnia, however, the Russian naval threat was more or less neutralized, as well as the ability for them to supply their army by water. As Sandels received news of the Russian defence line behind the Ume River, and how they supposedly counted only 1,200 men and 8 guns—while his own army grew to 2,400 men—he decided to go on the offensive. The advance, which would go over Hörnefors, turned out slower than expected and the Swedes lost the moment of surprise, while the Russians could gather more troops.

== Battle ==
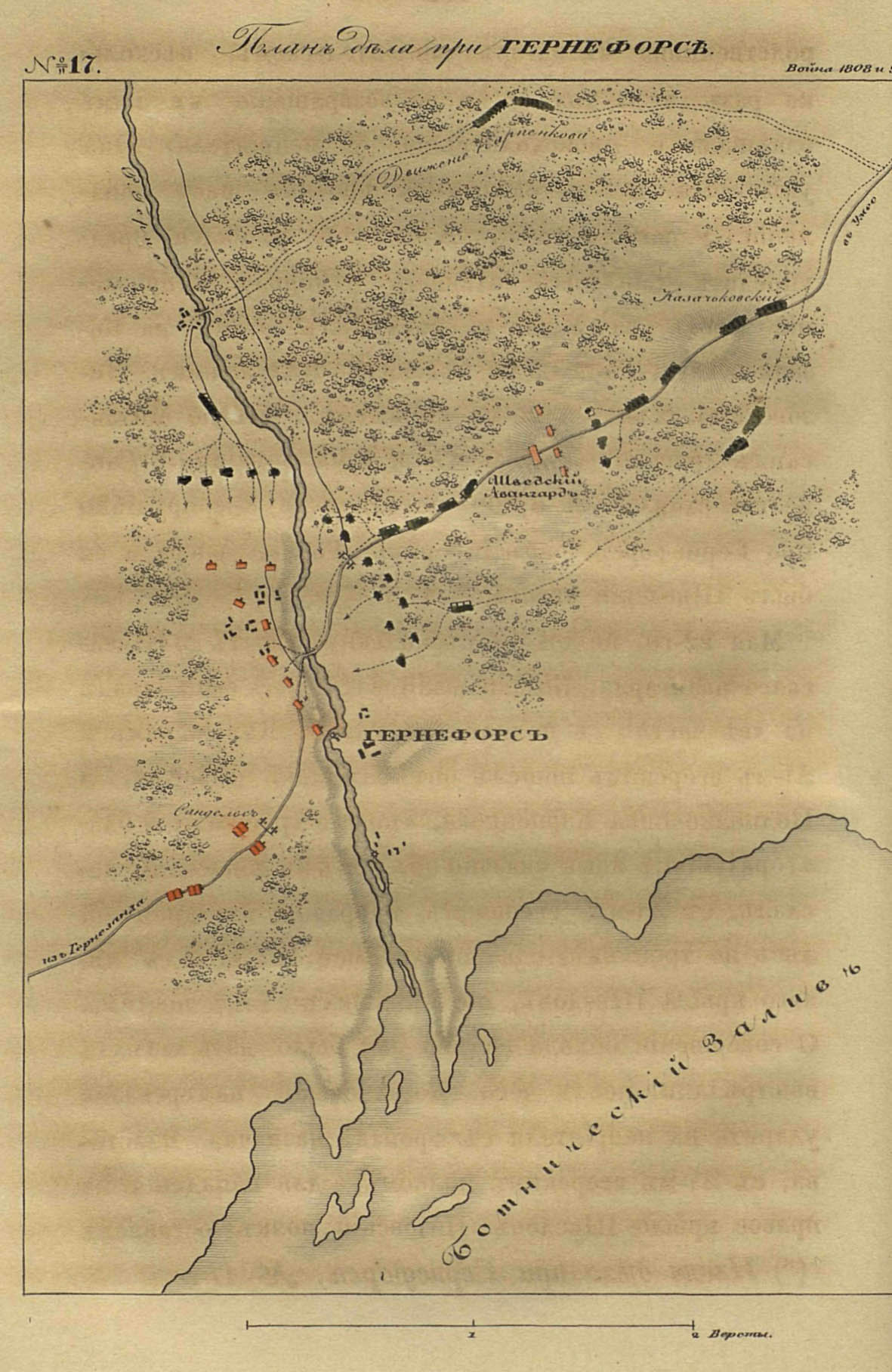
Map over the battle, by Alexander Mikhailovsky-Danilevsky

The Russians drove the Swedish vanguard back to Hörnefors, where the Swedish army gathered on 4 July. Because of sickness, Ilya Alekseyev had replaced Pavel Shuvalov as the commander of the Russian forces, which counted 3,350 men and 4 guns; he initially contemplated a Russian retreat but was soon instructed by Shuvalov, who remained with the army, to counterattack, which was done from Sörmjöle on 5 July. At nine o'clock on the evening, the bulk of the Russian army commenced to a frontal assault, pushing the Swedish patrols ahead of them, while two columns attempted to encircle the Swedish flanks. The attack, which Sandels had expected first the following day, caught the Swedish commander by surprise. The northern Russian flanking column was halted by the Österbotten battalion, while the southern column likewise ran into resistance, in form of two Hälsinge and Jämtland battalions.

The remaining Swedish forces held the center, along the Hörnån, defending the two bridges going over the river—expect for the Savolax 1st battalion, which was positioned furthest to the right at the river mouth (not engaged), and half of the Jämtland 2nd battalion, which was kept in reserve. At half past ten, after more than two hours of intense fighting, Sandels ordered a retreat after having received a false report claiming that the Russians had encircled his left flank, towards Ängersjö. The Savolax 2nd Battalion under Joachim Zachris Duncker acted as rearguard and covered the Swedish withdrawal; Duncker was mortally wounded under the fierce Russian pressure and his battalion dissolved with significant losses.

=== Swedish units ===
- Hälsinge Infantry Regiment: 1 battalion
- Jämtland Infantry Regiment: 2 battalions
- Swedish Infantry Battalion (a mix of recovered wounded and sick soldiers): 1 battalion
- Österbotten Field-Battalion (Österbotten Infantry Regiment): 1 battalion
- Savolax 1st Field-Battalion (Savolax Infantry Regiment): 1 battalion
- Savolax 2nd Field-Battalion (Savolax and Karelian jägers): 1 battalion
- Nyland and Karelian Dragoons: 10–20
- Artillery: 8 guns; 62 men

In total: 2,400 men and 8 guns

== Aftermath ==
Not even 2,000 Swedes, and about 2,700–3,000 Russians had been engaged in the fighting; the Swedes had sustained 10 officers and 157 privates killed, wounded or captured, while the Russians had 8 officers and 180 privates killed or wounded. At the dawn of 6 July, the defeated Swedish division crossed the Öre River and re-established defences close to their previous held positions, while fighting in northern Sweden ceased in favor of the ongoing peace negotiations. This was the last battle of the war in which troops from present-day Finland fought. Sweden was, and had been for a while, prepared to cede Finland to Russia—but not as far as to the Kalix River, as demanded by the Russian emperor Alexander I—on 16 August the Swedes landed a large force at Ratan, to free Västerbotten from Russian occupation and thus improve the peace terms. The two sides soon fought the concluding battles of Sävar and Ratan, after which a peace treaty was signed in Fredrikshamn.

== Literature ==
- Generalstaben, Krigshistoriska avdelningen (1922). Sveriges krig åren 1808 och 1809, Volume 9 (in Swedish). Stockholm: Kongl. boktryckeriet P. A. Norstedt & söner.
- Hornborg, Eirik (1955). När riket sprängdes: fälttågen i Finland och Västerbotten, 1808-1809 (in Swedish). Stockholm: P. A. Norstedts och Söners Förlag.
