= Tallberg Bridges =

Bridge in Nordmaling, Sweden

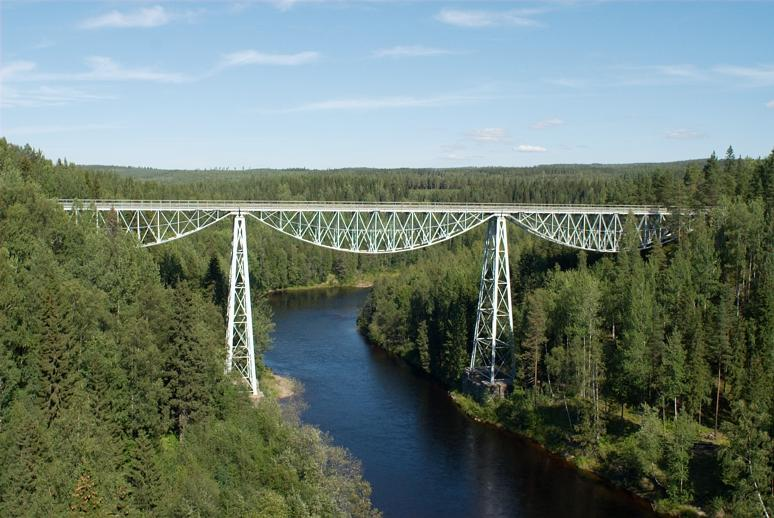
- Coordinates: 63°47′44″N 19°20′54″E
- Carries: Road (one bridge), Rail (two other bridges, one active)
- Crosses: Öre River
- Locale: Slätforsen, Sweden

The Tallberg Bridges (Tallbergsbroarna in Swedish) consist of three railway bridges that cross the Öre River at Slätforsen, about 4 km from Nyåker, Nordmaling Municipality in Sweden. They are part of the Northern Main Line through upper Norrland. One of the bridges has been rebuilt for road traffic. The three bridges show how bridge construction has changed over the course of a century.

== Details ==
The oldest bridge is a steel truss bridge built in 1891, now a road bridge. The concrete bridge from 1919 has been declared a historic monument.

The first bridge was built to allow the rail line to head north; it is made of steel and is 180m long (it is now a road bridge). As the power of steam locomotives increased, a sturdier bridge was needed. A reinforced concrete structure was built in 1919, 140m downstream, towering 90m over the river. The third and final bridge was built of steel and concrete, opening in 1994. It is 338m long, the longest bridge on the rail line.

=== 1891 Bridge ===
This bridge is a steel truss bridge, with four suspended parabolic trusses (each of a different length), for a total span of 164m. It now serves as the road bridge over the river.

=== 1919 Bridge ===
Completed in 1919, this bridge has four arches. When built, it was the longest concrete span for rail traffic.

=== 1994 Bridge ===
Completed in 1994, it is used for rail traffic. Composed of six sections, the bridge was built with concrete and steel.
