= Anita Gradin =

Swedish politician and diplomat (1933–2022)

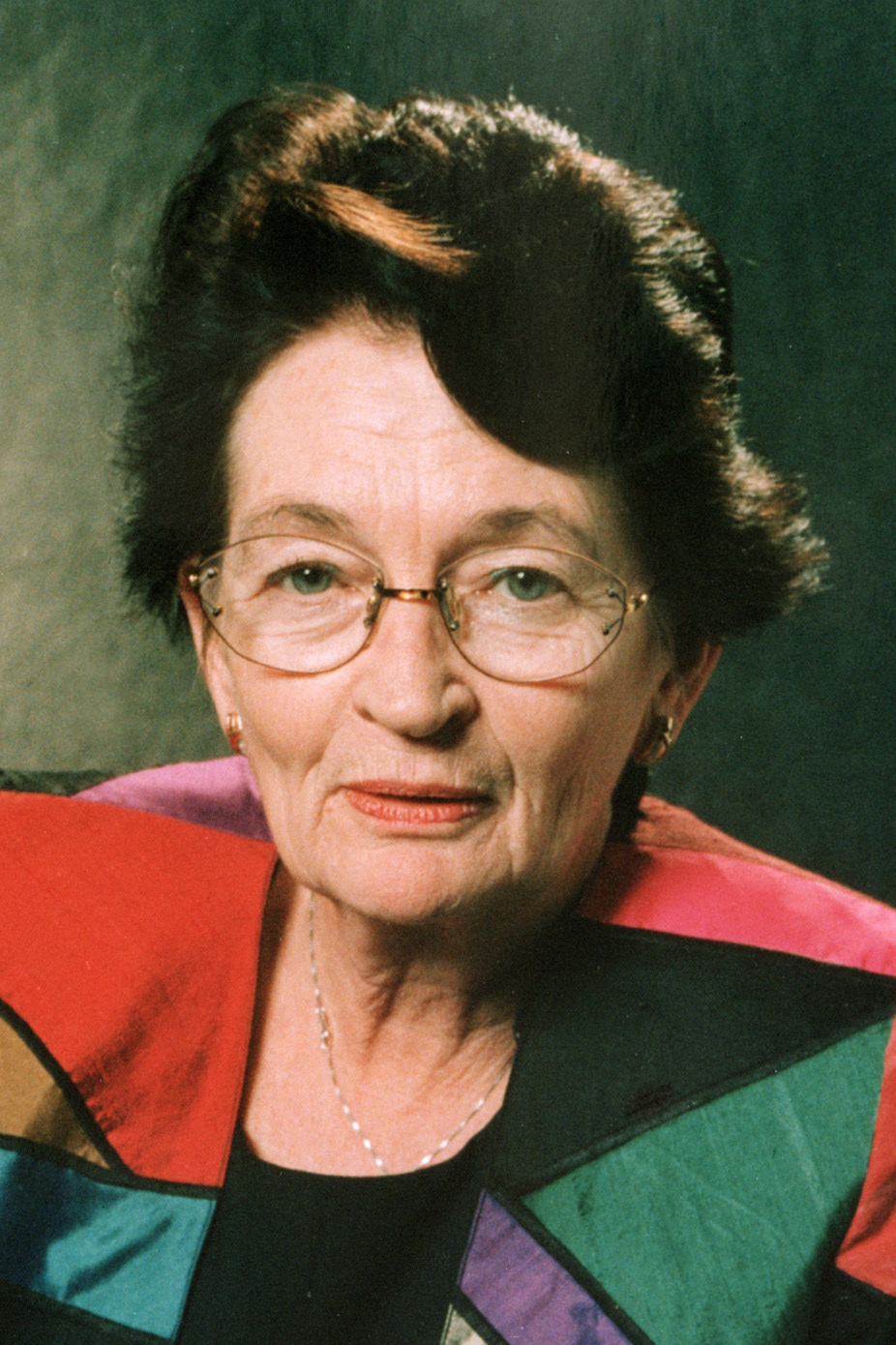
- Official portrait, 1996

European Commissioner for Immigration, Justice, Home Affairs, and Financial Control and Fraud Prevention
- In office 1995–1999
- President: Jacques Santer
- Preceded by: Position established
- Succeeded by: António Vitorino

Member of Parliament
- In office 1969–1992

Personal details
- Born: Anita Ingegerd Gradin; 12 August 1933 Hörnefors, Sweden
- Died: 23 May 2022 (aged 88)
- Party: Social Democratic Party
- Other political affiliations: Party of European Socialists

Anita Ingegerd Gradin (12 August 1933 – 23 May 2022) was a Swedish politician and ambassador. She was the minister with responsibility for immigrant and equality affairs at the Ministry of Employment in Sweden from 1982 to 1986. She was minister of foreign trade at the Ministry of Foreign Affairs from 1986 to 1991. From 1995 to 1999 she was a member of the European Commission responsible for immigration, home affairs and justice; relations with the Ombudsman; and financial control and fraud prevention.

Gradin was president of Socialist International Women and worked against the trafficking of women.

== Early life ==
Gradin was born on 12 August 1933 in Hörnefors, Västerbotten County, Sweden, the daughter of paper worker Ossian Gradin and his wife Alfhild (née Englund). Gradin completed his lower secondary school examination (realexamen) in 1950. From 1950 to 1952, he worked as a journalist at Västerbottens Folkblad. He was then employed by the Swedish Union of Forest Workers and Log Drivers from 1952 to 1955. During this period, he attended the LO School in 1953 and the British-Nordic Folk High School in Manchester in 1954. From 1955 to 1958, he worked as a journalist at Arbetarbladet in Gävle. In 1958, he attended the Nordic Folk High School in Geneva, and in 1960 he earned a degree in social work in Stockholm.

== Career ==
She was a journalist at the TCO magazine 1960–63. Gradin was employed by the Social Affairs Planning Committee in Stockholm as secretary of the City College's Women's Affairs Committee, 1963–67, Secretary of State at the 1963 Council of Ministers, Member of the School Board's Educational Board 1971–81, by the International Health and Social Affairs Committee 1972–78, chairman of the Board of International Adoption Issues 1973–79 and Member of the 1982 Experts Group on Immigration Research. Gradin was a member of the 1974 Semester Committee 1974–1975, of the 1974–1977 Research Education Survey, by the Delegation for Gender Equality 1975–1976, by the 1978–81 Research Co-operation Committee and by the 1980–80 Abortion Committee. She was a specialist in the hotel and restaurant survey 1974–78, a member of the 1975 business committee 1975–77, chairman of Sweden's social association 1976–81, and a board member of Stockholm's workers' municipality 1968–82. She was chairman of the Stockholm City Social Democratic Women's District 1968–82 and Vice Chairman of the Women's Association from 1975. Gradin was a member of the City Council in Stockholm in 1966–68 as well as a member of the Danish People's Welfare Board / Dental Committee 1966–76. In 1997, Gradin was appointed as an honorary citizen in her hometown, Umeå.

=== EU Commissioner ===
When Sweden joined the European Union in 1995, Gradin was appointed Sweden's first member of the European Commission, under its chairman, Jacques Santer. She was responsible for immigration, justice and home affairs, relations with the European Ombudsman, economic governance and control and anti-fraud. She ended up in focus since the anti-fraud campaign was found to be neglected and several Commissioners, in particular, Édith Cresson, were accused of corruption. In March 1999, the entire Santer Commission was forced to resign and be replaced by an interim commission led by Manuel Marín. Gradin was also included in the Marín Commission and finally resigned in November 1999 when the Prodi Commission took office. During her time in the EU Commission, Gradin contributed, among other things, to legislation on gender equality, increased transparency and criminalization of trafficking.

== Personal life ==
Gradin was married to Lieutenant Colonel Bertil Kersfelt (born 1934).

== Death ==
Gradin died in May 2022, aged 88.

== Positions ==
- Member of the Riksdag (in the second chamber of Stockholm city 1969–70) 1969–1992
- Deputy member of the 1969–70 Committees
- Deputy member of the Justice Committee 1971–82
- Member of the Education Committee 1971–76
- Member of the Finance Committee 1976–82
- Alternate member of the Council of Europe's Swedish delegation 1973–80 and member 1981–82
- State Council 8 October 1982 – 1991
- Ministry of Labor (Minister for Immigration and Equal Opportunities) 1982–1986
- Minister of Foreign Trade 1986–1991
- Member of the Riksdag, Vice Chairman of the Committee on Nutrition 1991–1992
- Ambassador to Vienna 1992–1994
- Member of the European Commission 1995–1999
- Chairman of the Chamber of Commerce Sweden-Israel

== Awards and decorations ==
- Grand Decoration of Honour in Gold with Sash for Services to the Republic of Austria (1994)
- Nominated on 9 May 2007 by the European Movement in Sweden to the 2007 European of the Year in Sweden.

== Works ==
- Lagstadgad lycka? En bok om lag, samhälle och äktenskap (1971)
- Vårdkunskap: Socialmedicin (1972)
- Från bruket till Bryssel: minnen från ett politiskt liv (2009)
- Klingvall och Ström (red): Från Myrdal till Lindh. Svenska diplomatprofiler. (2010)

== Biographies (selection) ==
- Statutory happiness? A book about society, marriage and marriage (1971)
- Health Care: Social Medicine (1972)
- From the mill to Brussels: memories of a political life (2009)
- Klingvall and Strøm (red): From Myrdal to Lindh. Swedish diplomat profiles. (2010)

Diplomatic posts
Preceded by Curt Lidgard	Ambassador of Sweden to Austria; 1992–1994	Succeeded by Björn Skala
Preceded by None	Ambassador of Sweden to Slovenia; 1992–1994	Succeeded by Björn Skala
Political offices
New office	Swedish European Commissioner; 1995–1999	Succeeded by Margot Wallström
