= List of ambassadors of Sweden to Slovenia =

Ambassador of Sweden to Slovenia
- Lesser coat of arms of the Kingdom of Sweden
- Incumbent; Diana Madunic since 22 November 2023
- Ministry for Foreign Affairs; Swedish Embassy, Budapest
- Style: His or Her Excellency (formal); Mr. or Madam Ambassador (informal)
- Reports to: Minister for Foreign Affairs
- Seat: Budapest, Hungary (Note: Since 2020, the Swedish ambassador in Budapest is also accredited in Ljubljana.)
- Appointer: Government of Sweden
- Term length: No fixed term
- Formation: 1992
- First holder: Anita Gradin

The Ambassador of Sweden to Slovenia (known formally as the Ambassador of the Kingdom of Sweden to the Republic of Slovenia) is the official representative of the government of Sweden to the president of Slovenia and the government of Slovenia. Since Sweden does not have an embassy in Ljubljana, Sweden's ambassador in Budapest, Hungary, is also accredited to Ljubljana.

== History ==
On 15 January 1992, Sweden recognized Slovenia as an independent state. The Swedish government decided on 23 January 1992 to enter into an agreement with Slovenia to establish diplomatic relations. The agreement came into effect on 29 January 1992. It was signed in Ljubljana by Ambassador Martin Hallqvist and Slovenia's Deputy Foreign Minister, Zoran Thaler. The same year, Sweden's ambassador in Vienna, Austria, was also accredited to Slovenia's capital, Ljubljana.

Ahead of Slovenia's upcoming EU membership, and in accordance with established practice to maintain embassies in other EU member states, Sweden opened an embassy in Ljubljana at the beginning of the year 2000. The embassy closed 10 years later, in 2010.

After that, Sweden's ambassador in Vienna was once again also accredited to Ljubljana. Since 2020, Sweden's ambassador in Budapest, Hungary, has been the one accredited to Ljubljana.

== List of representatives ==
Name	Period	Resident / Non-resident	Title	Resident / Concurrent accreditation	Notes	Presented credentials	Ref
Anita Gradin	1992–1994	Non-resident	Ambassador	Resident in Vienna	Political appointee (non-career diplomat)		
Björn Skala	1995–1999	Non-resident	Ambassador	Resident in Vienna			
John-Christer Åhlander	2000–2003	Resident	Ambassador	Also accredited to San Marino (2001–2003)			
John Hagard	2003–2008	Resident	Ambassador				
Inger Ultvedt	2008–2010	Resident	Ambassador				
Nils Daag	2011–2015	Non-resident	Ambassador	Resident in Vienna			
Helen Eduards	2016–2018	Non-resident	Ambassador	Resident in Vienna			
Mikaela Kumlin Granit	2018–2020	Non-resident	Ambassador	Resident in Vienna			
Dag Hartelius	2020–2023	Non-resident	Ambassador	Resident in Budapest			
Diana Madunic	22 November 2023 – present	Non-resident	Ambassador	Resident in Budapest		22 November 2023	
