= Nikolay Tuchkov =

Russian general (1765 - 1812)

Nikolay Alexeyevich Tuchkov
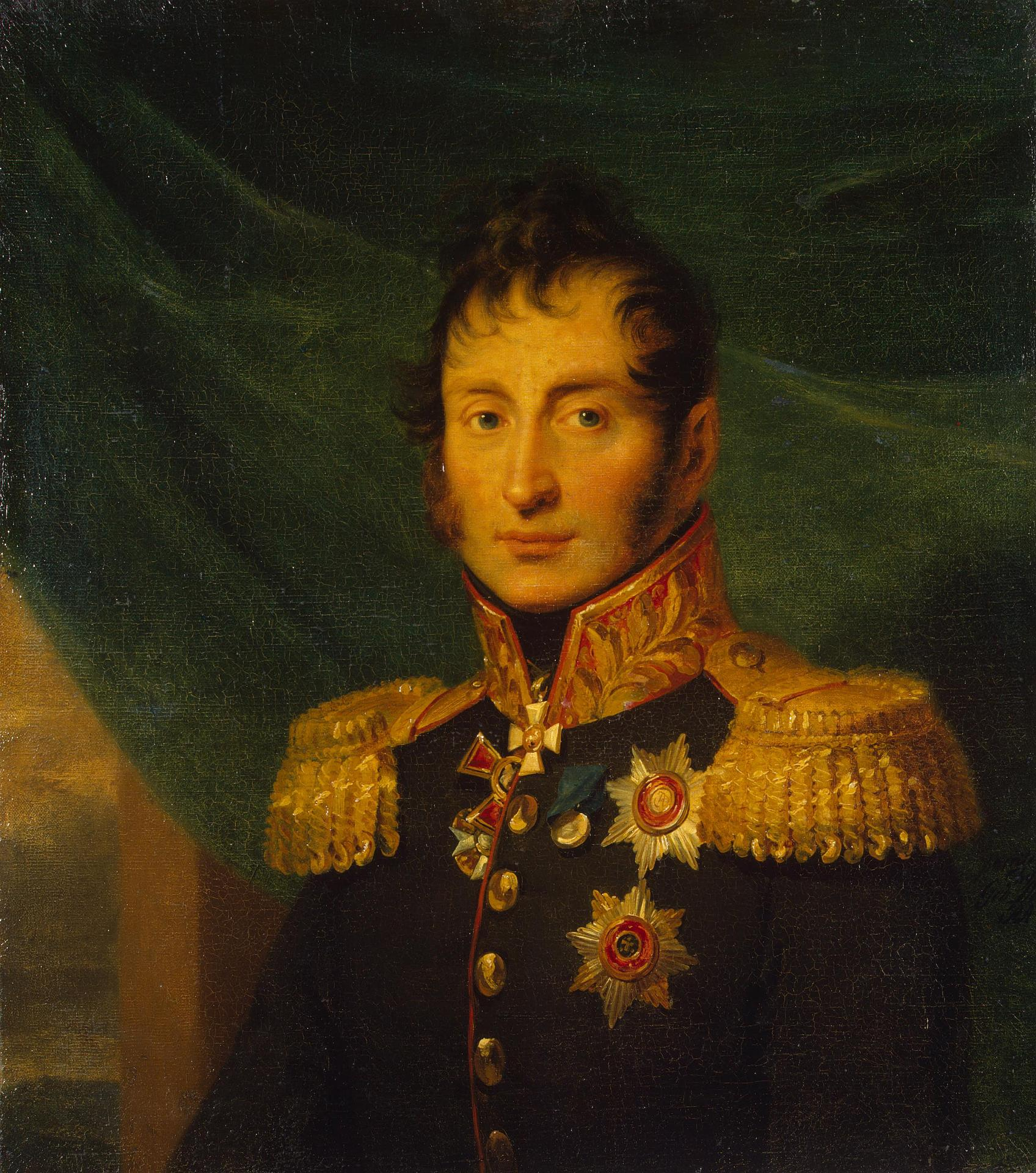
- Portrait by George Dawe
- Born: 16 April 1765
- Died: October 30, 1812 (aged 47); Yaroslavl
- Other name: Nikolai Alekseyevich Tuchkov
- Military career
- Allegiance: Imperial Russia
- Branch: Infantry
- Rank: lieutenant general
- Conflicts: Russo-Swedish War (1788–1790); Polish–Russian War of 1792; Kościuszko Uprising; War of the Second Coalition; War of the Fourth Coalition; Finnish War; Russo-Turkish War (1806–1812); French invasion of Russia

Nikolay Alexeyevich Tuchkov (16 April 1765 – 30 October 1812, Yaroslavl) was a Russian general of the Russo-Swedish War (1788–1790), the suppression of the Kościuszko Uprising and the opposition to the French invasion of Russia. He rose to the rank of lieutenant general and commander of an infantry corps.

== Career ==
The brother of Pavel & Alexander Tuchkov, Nikolay first came to note as a Major General commanding a Brigade of Gortchakov's wing under Korsakov in Switzerland, 1799, serving at the Second Battle of Zurich 25–26 September. In 1806 he commanded the 5th Division of Buxhoeveden's 2nd Army under Mikhail Kamensky in Poland, and served at the Battle of Pultusk 26 December. In the January 1807 offensive he commanded three Divisions (5th, 7th & 8th), and the right wing at Eylau 7/8 February 1807, where his troops were the first to be engaged. He was made commander on the Narew front that summer. On 11 June he drove Claparède from Drenzewo & Borki, but was forced back by Andre Masséna on the 12th. After hearing news of the defeat at Friedland on the 27th he abandoned Ostrolenka & retreated on Tykoczin, and was subsequently replaced by Tolstoi before the Treaty of Tilsit.

In 1808 he commanded the 5th Division under Buxhowden in Finland, serving at Revolax, 27 April. Stationed at Kuopio, he was then halted by Sandels at Idensalmi, 15 October.

Commanding 3 Divisions in Wallachia, he was sent south for operations against Turkey in late August 1811. In 1812 he commanded the 3rd Corps of Mikhail Barclay de Tolly's 1st Army of the West. He fought at Smolensk 17 August, then with Württemberg was defeated by Michel Ney at Lubino on the 19th, however, having sustained lesser losses against superior forces. Stationed on the left flank at Borodino on 7 September, he was gravely wounded in the chest leading the Pavlovsky Grenadiers against Utitsa during a successful counterattack and died three weeks later.

== Bibliography ==
- Petre, F. Loraine. Napoleon's Campaign in Poland, 1806–1807. London: John Lane, 1907. OCLC 04519385
