= Ilya I. Alekseyev =

Russian military officer (1772–1830)

Ilya Alekseyev
- Илья Алексеев
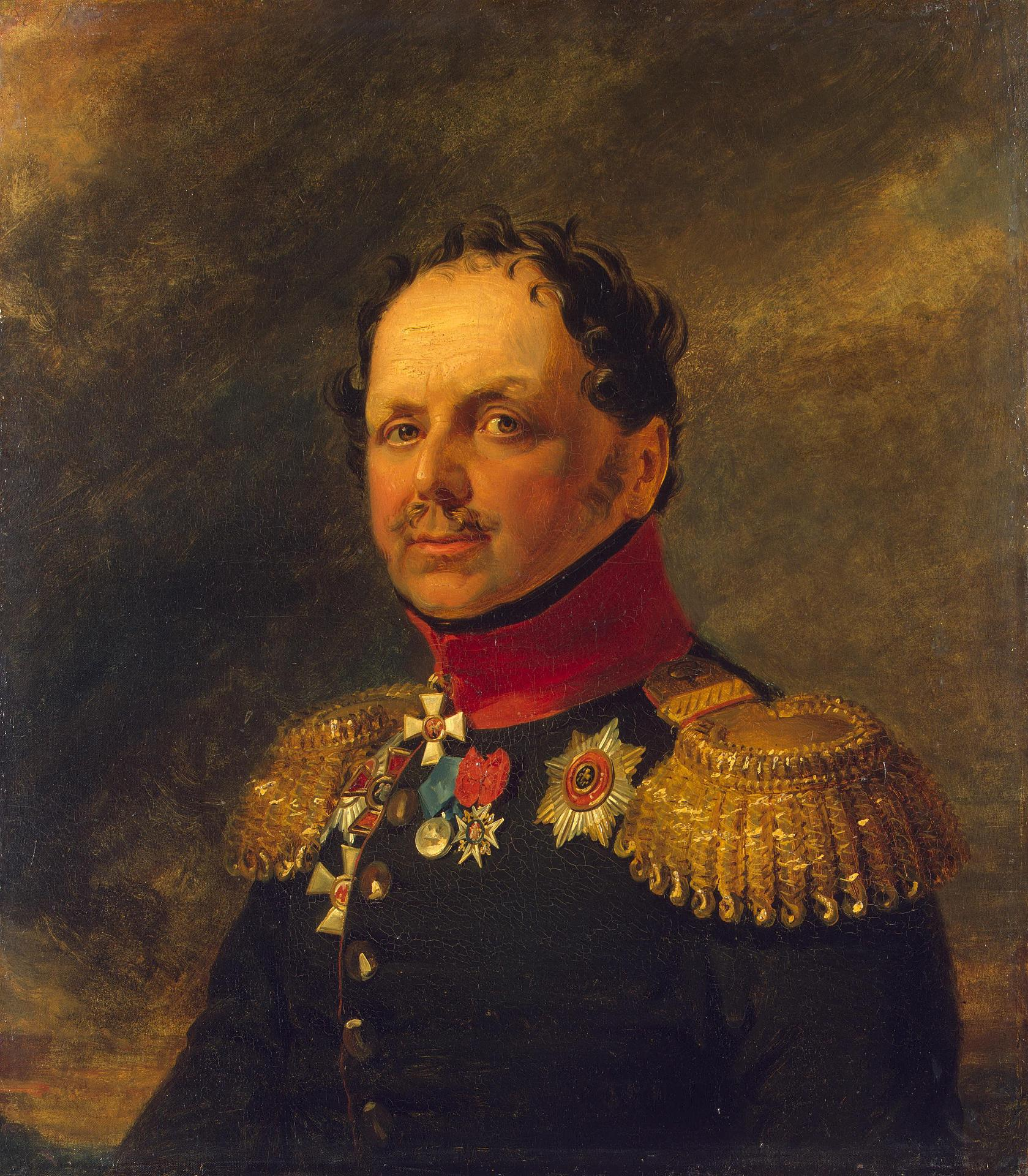
- Portrait by George Dawe, before 1825
- Born: 18 July 1772; Russia
- Died: 3 October 1830 (aged 58)
- Military career
- Allegiance: Russian Empire
- Branch: Army
- Service years: 1796–1816
- Rank: Lieutenant General
- Conflicts: Russo-Swedish War (1788–90); Russo-Turkish War (1787–92); Siege of Izmail; Finnish War; Battle of Pälkjärvi; Battle of Hörnefors; War of the Fourth Coalition; Battle of Eylau; Battle of Guttstadt-Deppen; Battle of Heilsberg; Battle of Friedland; Patriotic War of 1812; First Battle of Polotsk; Battle of Chashniki; Battle of Smoliani; War of the Sixth Coalition; Battle of Lützen (WIA)

Ilya Ivanovich Alexeyev (or Alekseyev, Alekseev; (Note: Russian: Илья Иванович Алексеев) 18 July 1772 – 3 October 1830) was a Russian Imperial Army officer, known for his service during the Napoleonic Wars.

== Biography ==
Coming from the nobility of the province of Moscow, Ilya Ivanovich Alexeyev began his military career at the Preobrazhensky Regiment. In October 1789, he took part as Sergeant in the Russo-Swedish War (1788–90), during which he was wounded twice. After the war, he was transferred to a regiment of horse guards. During the Russo-Turkish War of 1787–1792, he participated in the capture of Izmail (22 December 1790). After four years of service in the rank of Captain, it was incorporated into the Sumy Cavalry Regiment operating in Poland and was raised in 1796 to grade Major, cavalry inspector, and then aide of military governor of Moscow.

On 9 August 1799 Ilya Alekseyev was elevated to the rank of colonel and soon after, he served as head of the Moscow police. After the transformation of Squadrons Moscow Police in the Mitau Hussar Regiment, he was appointed the commander and took part in various battles on Prussian soil. He showed great bravery in the battles of Eylau, Guttstadt, the Heilsberg and Friedland. As a reward for his courage in battle on 24 May 1809, he was promoted to Major General.

In the Russo-Swedish War of 1808–1809, Major General ordered a vanguard detachment and he was decorated in 1809 to his exploits on the battlefield. He received the Order of St. Anna (1st class)—with Golden Weapon for Bravery, and the Order of St. George (3rd class).

During the 1812 Patriotic War, he took part in the first Polotsk battle on 31 October 1812 and fought at the Battle of Chashniki, and the Battle of Smoliani.

Major General Alexeyev was seriously wounded in the leg during the German Campaign of 1813, the Battle of Lutzen. After his recovery, in August 1814, he was appointed commander of the 3rd division of dragoon and 30 August 1815 he distinguished himself at the siege of Metz, and was promoted to lieutenant-general, in recognition of the bravery he showed in battle.

Ilya Ivanovich Alekseyev died on 3 October 1830 and was buried at the Simonov Monastery in Moscow.

== Sources ==
- http://www.museum.ru/1812/persons/slovar/index.html
