= Hörnån =

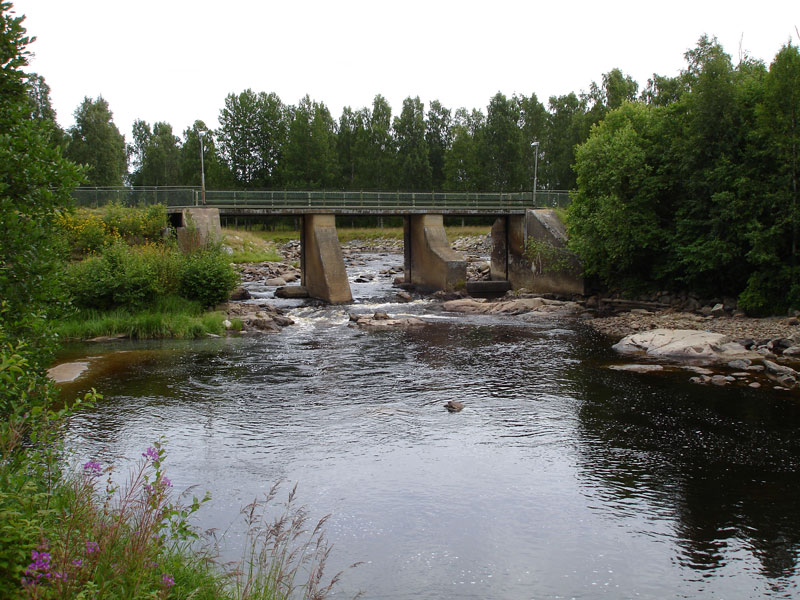

Location
- Country: Sweden
- County: Västerbotten

Physical characteristics
- Mouth: Bothnian Bay
  - location: Hörnefors
  - coordinates: 63°36′40″N 19°55′00″E
  - elevation: 0 m (0 ft)
- Length: 70 km (43 mi)
- Basin size: 391.7 km^{2} (151.2 sq mi)

Hörnån is a river in Sweden.
