= Combat of Rosslau =

1813 battle during the War of the Sixth Coalition

- Part of the German campaign of the Sixth Coalition
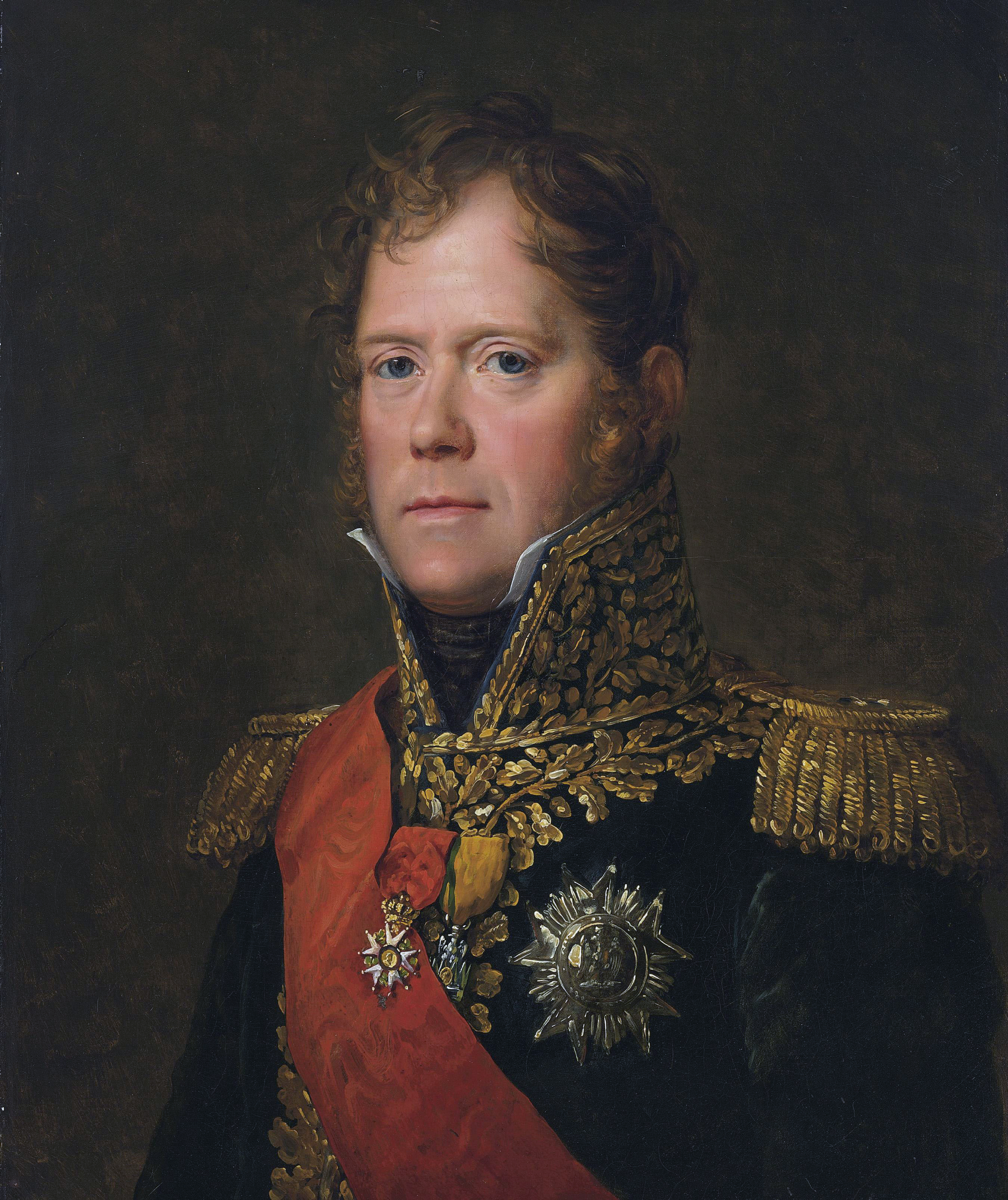
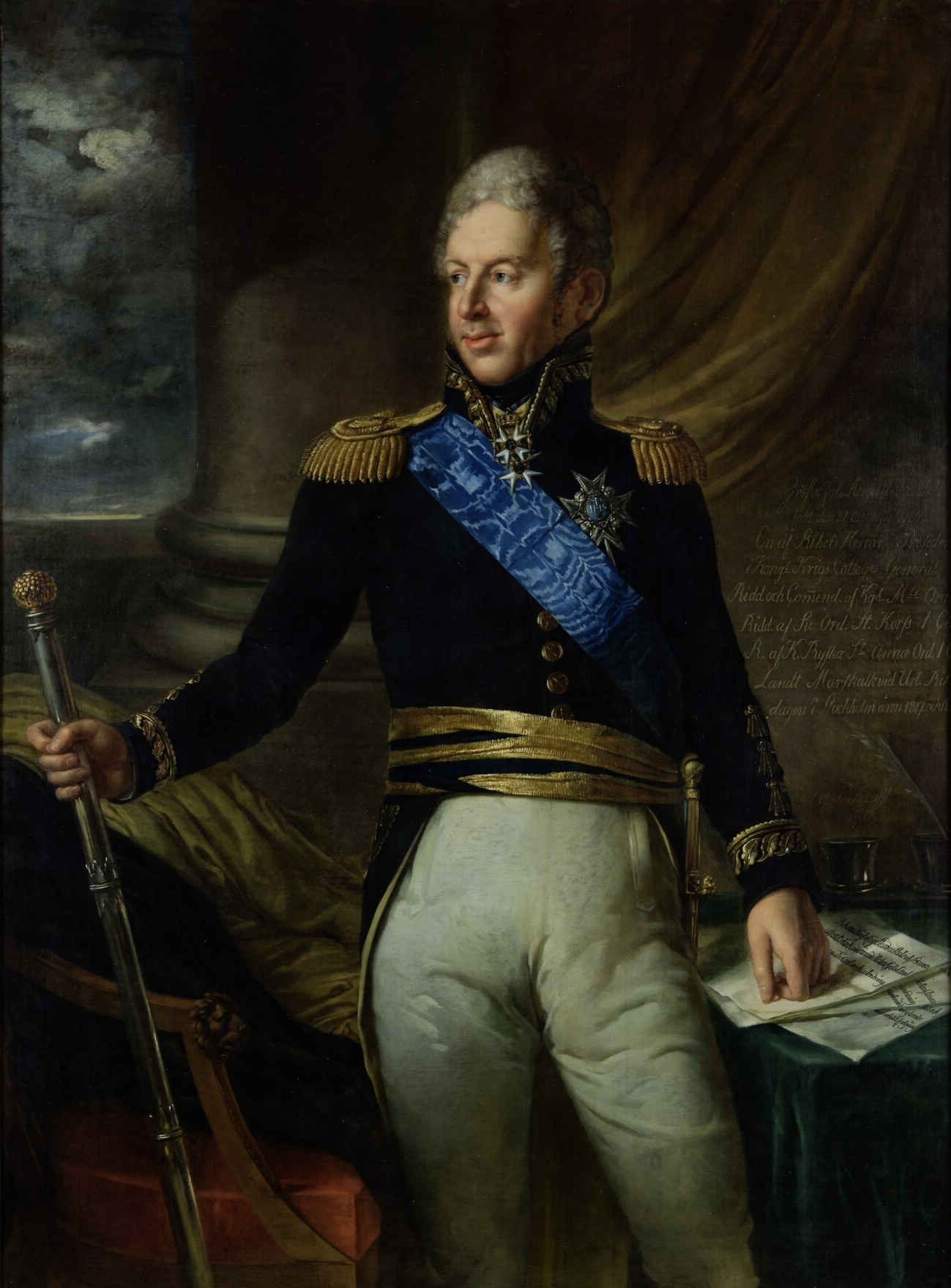
- Michel Ney (left) and Johan August Sandels (right)
Date	29 September 1813
Location	Dessau-Roßlau, Germany 51°50′N 12°15′E
Result	Swedish victory

Belligerents
(First French Empire) French Empire	Sweden

Commanders and leaders
(First French Empire) Michel Ney	Johan August Sandels

Strength
7,000–8,000	4,000–4,500

Casualties and losses
600–800	286–400

War of the Sixth Coalition:
German campaign
current battle
Napoleon in command
Napoleon not in command

The Combat of Rosslau was fought in the War of the Sixth Coalition on 29 September 1813, near Rosslau, Germany. Michel Ney attacked the Swedish bridgehead at the Elbe, to stop the Army of the North from crossing the river. The Swedish commander Johan August Sandels counterattacked and chased the French for 5 km (3 mi) before being forced to retire himself. About 350 Swedes were dead and wounded while the French had 600 losses. The battle had no strategic effects, but it was one of very few times in the war that a Swedish force was fully committed in battle.

== Background ==
A French force under Michel Ney had received orders from Napoleon I to attack the Swedish bridgehead over the Elbe river, at Rosslau, to stop the Army of the North (under the Swedish Crown Prince Charles John) from reaching Leipzig. After having fought a couple of skirmishes for control over Dessau, Ney marched his troops of about 7,000–8,000 men towards the Swedish left flank. The Swedes had around 4,000–4,500 men in the vicinity, led by Johan August Sandels; consisting of the Skaraborg (3 battalions), Älvsborg (3 battalions) and Västgöta (2 battalions) infantry regiments, along with one battalion of the Värmland jägers. Ney attacked on 29 September and ordered a vanguard of three battalions forward, in an attempt to quickly capture the Swedish bridgehead at Roßlau.

== Battle ==
The Swedish outposts in front of the bridgehead were attacked early in the morning and, after several hours resistance, forced to retreat; Sandels organized his men during this time and, instead of receiving the attack behind the cover of the entrenchments—as was instructed by Crown Prince Charles John—commenced a counterattack. One Skaraborg battalion and a detachment of jägers marched straight on the French forces in the open and stopped at a distance of just over 30 m (98 ft) before firing; shaken by the initial volley the French withdrew slightly to seek cover at a forest a distance away, by which time an intense firefight began. After receiving two additional battalions, the Swedes felt confident enough to launch a bayonet-attack, which threw the French forces back into the forest. The Swedes pursued for almost 5 km (3 mi) before the French, who progressively received more reinforcements the further back they went, were able to halt their advance; the outnumbered Swedes were in turn forced to withdraw towards the bridgehead, while the French were able to deploy a battery shooting at their flank and causing significant casualties among their ranks.

== Aftermath ==
The Swedes lost 48 killed and 238 wounded, or between 300 and 400 men according to Charles John. A majority of these were suffered by the Skaraborg regiment, with at least 19 privates killed and 144 wounded. Some Swedish sources attest to having dealt 1,500 French losses, but this figure is most likely inflated. The French suffered the most as they were pursued through the forest; between 700 and 800 of them were reportedly buried inside Dessau. Charles John estimated 600 French losses in a letter to Alexander I of Russia.

The Skaraborg infantry regiment had distinguished themselves especially. Some time later, as Ney returned to the Swedish bridgehead with his army, he disregarded an assault and instead attempted to blockade the Swedish entrenchments. Some progress was made but the operation was eventually cancelled with the news of the allied crossing of the Elbe, at Wartenburg, on 3 October. Having crossed the river, the allied armies were then able to encircle the French emperor and decisively defeat him at the Battle of Leipzig, on 16–19 October 1813.

Because of Charles John's unwillingness to commit his Swedish troops on the battlefield—to save them for a forthcoming invasion of Denmark and campaign in Norway—the performance of the Swedes was often disregarded in German literature; as has been the case with this lesser-known battle. While it had no strategic effects at all, it was one of very few times in the war that a larger Swedish force was fully committed in battle.

== Notes ==
Preceded by Battle of the Göhrde	Napoleonic Wars; Combat of Rosslau	Succeeded by Battle of Wartenburg
