= Toivala =

Village in North Savo, Finland

Coordinates: 62°59′20″N 027°43′45″E

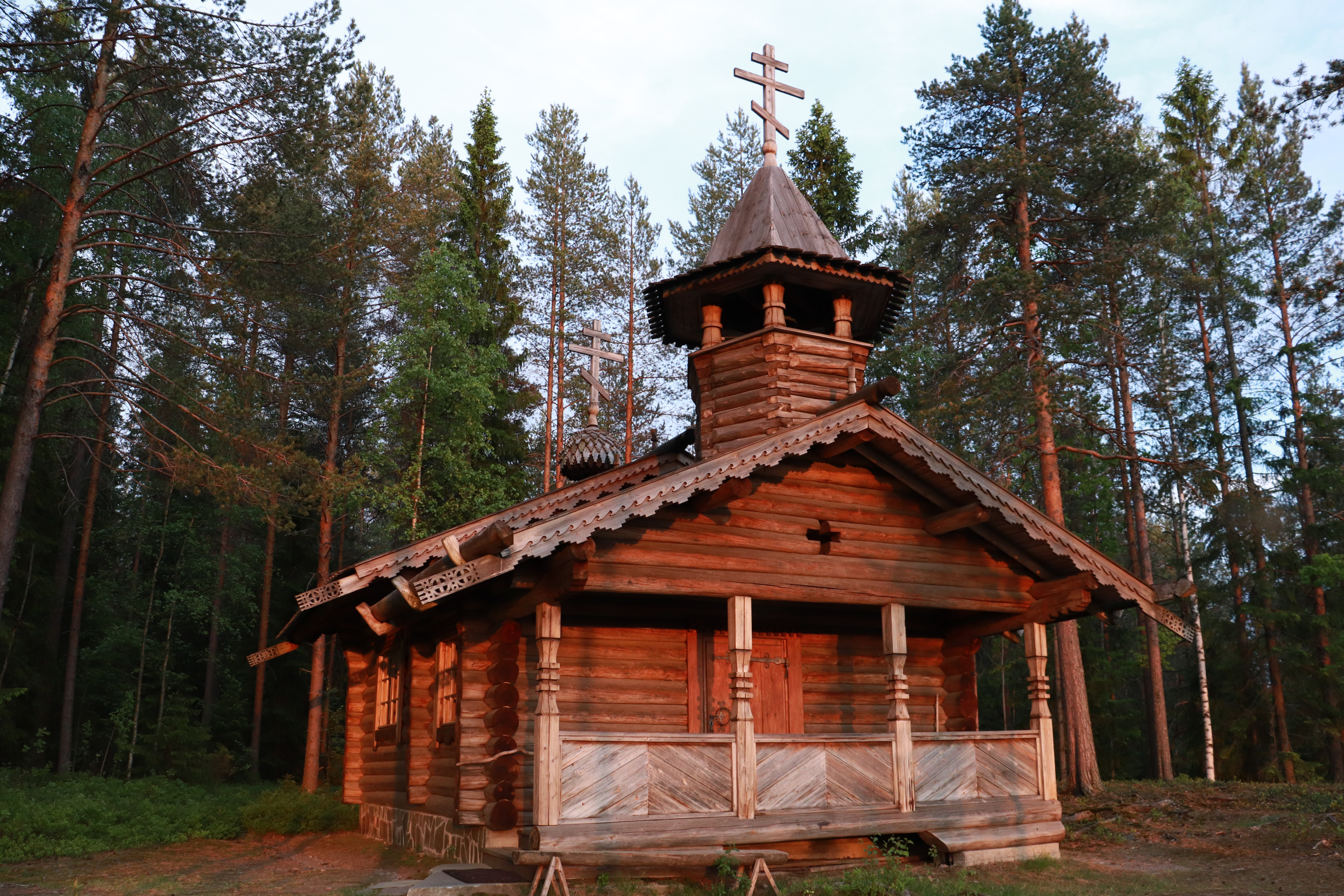
Toivala tsasouna

Toivala is a village in Siilinjärvi, near the border with Kuopio, in North Savo, Finland.

== Details ==
There are four schools in Toivala located along Highway 5 (E63) and the railway: Toivala School, Suininlahti School, Ingmani Vocational and Craft College, and the Forestry and Nature Education Unit of Savon Vocational and Adult College, formerly known as Metsäkoulu (lit. 'Forestryschool'). As of 2023, the primary school (Toivala School) has about 280 students and the middle school (Suininlahti School) has about 350 students.

The distance from the village to Kuopio is about 14 kilometres (8.7 mi) and to center of Siilinjärvi about 9 kilometres (5.6 mi). Local industry include both metal and pharmaceutical companies. In the vicinity of Toivala, as part of the Toivala-Vuorela agglomeration, are the residential areas of Vuorela and Haaparinne, as well as Kuopio Airport.
