= Battle of Pulkkila =

1808 battle of the Finnish War

Coordinates: 64°16′05″N 25°52′00″E

- Part of the Finnish War
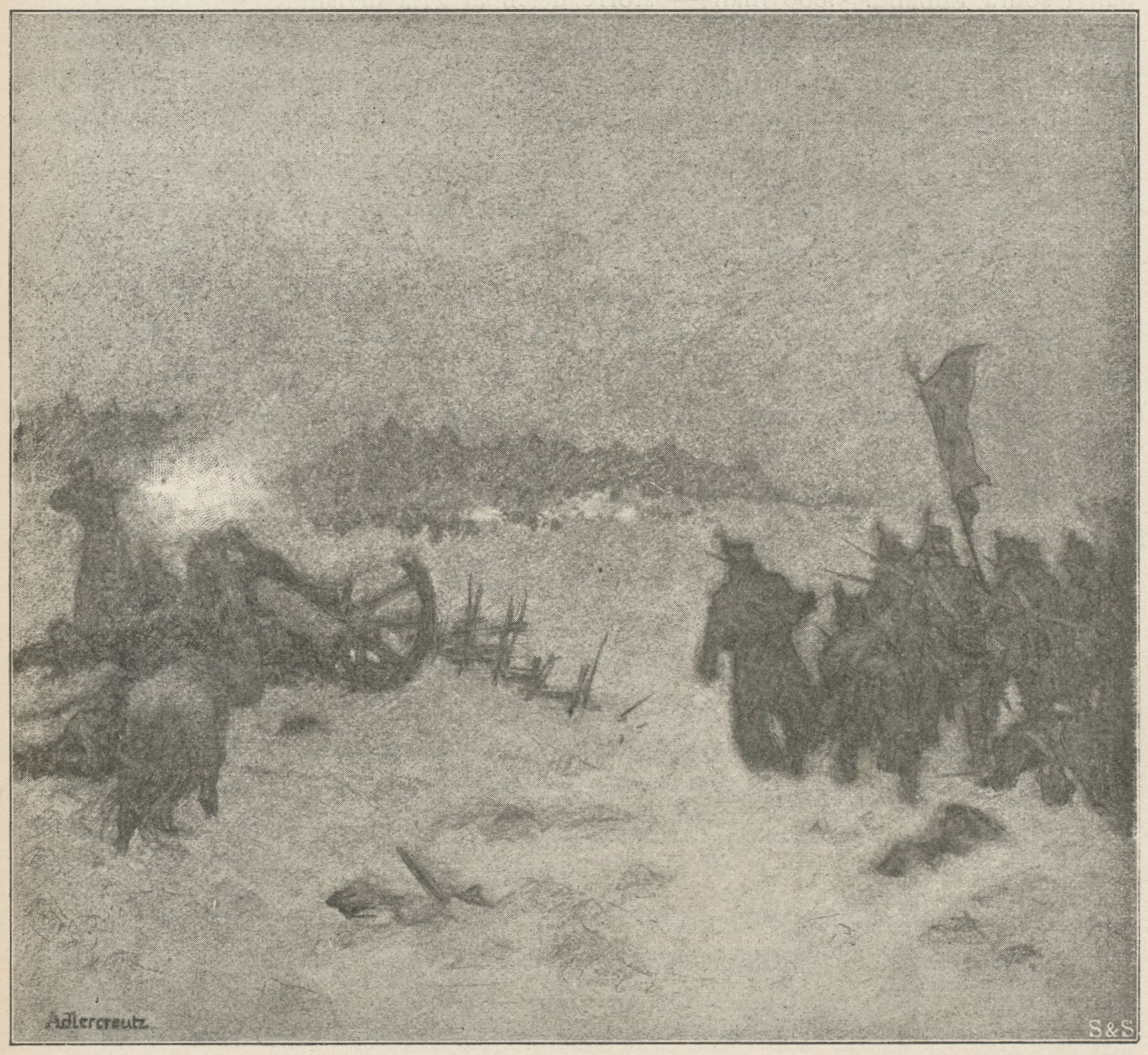
- Striden vid Pulkkila. Svenskarnas anfall, by Magnus Adlercreutz
Date	2 May 1808
Location	Pulkkila, Finland
Result	Swedish victory

Belligerents
Sweden	Russian Empire

Commanders and leaders
Johan August Sandels	(Russian Empire) Colonel Obuhov

Strength
800	320+

Casualties and losses
10 killed 65 wounded	42 killed 282 captured (of which 49 wounded)

The Battle of Pulkkila was fought between Swedish and Russian forces near Pulkkila in Northern Ostrobothnia on 2 May 1808 during the Finnish War.

At the battle of Pulkkila on 2 May 1808, Johan August Sandels marched eastwards to liberate those parts of Finland that were under Russian control. During the march they encountered some Russian troops at Pulkkila. Sandels used about 800 men for the attack; of which 350 from the Västerbotten Regiment and 80 from the Savolax jägers. The Russian troops were led by Colonel Obuhov. The Russians were soon surrounded and tried desperately to break out, but they were forced back to a nearby village where the Russians were defeated after some vicious fighting. The Russian commander was forced to surrender to the attacking Swedes. The Swedes then went on and retook the town of Kuopio in the middle of Finland.

Sandels' offensive was one of the most remarkable operations of the entire war. During his operations against Barclay de Tolly's troops, he captured Russian depots, constantly harassed their rear areas, and committed actions that won him respect among both friends and foes.

However, Swedish success was only temporary in the Summer Campaign 1808 and the Russian counteroffensive resulted in the Swedish retreat in late August 1808.

== Notes, citations and sources ==
=== Sources ===
- Hornborg, Eirik (1955). När riket sprängdes: fälttågen i Finland och Västerbotten, 1808-1809 (in Swedish). Stockholm: P. A. Norstedts och Söners Förlag.
