= Battle of Koljonvirta =

1808 battle of the Finnish War

Coordinates: 63°35′19″N 27°09′51″E

- Part of the Finnish War
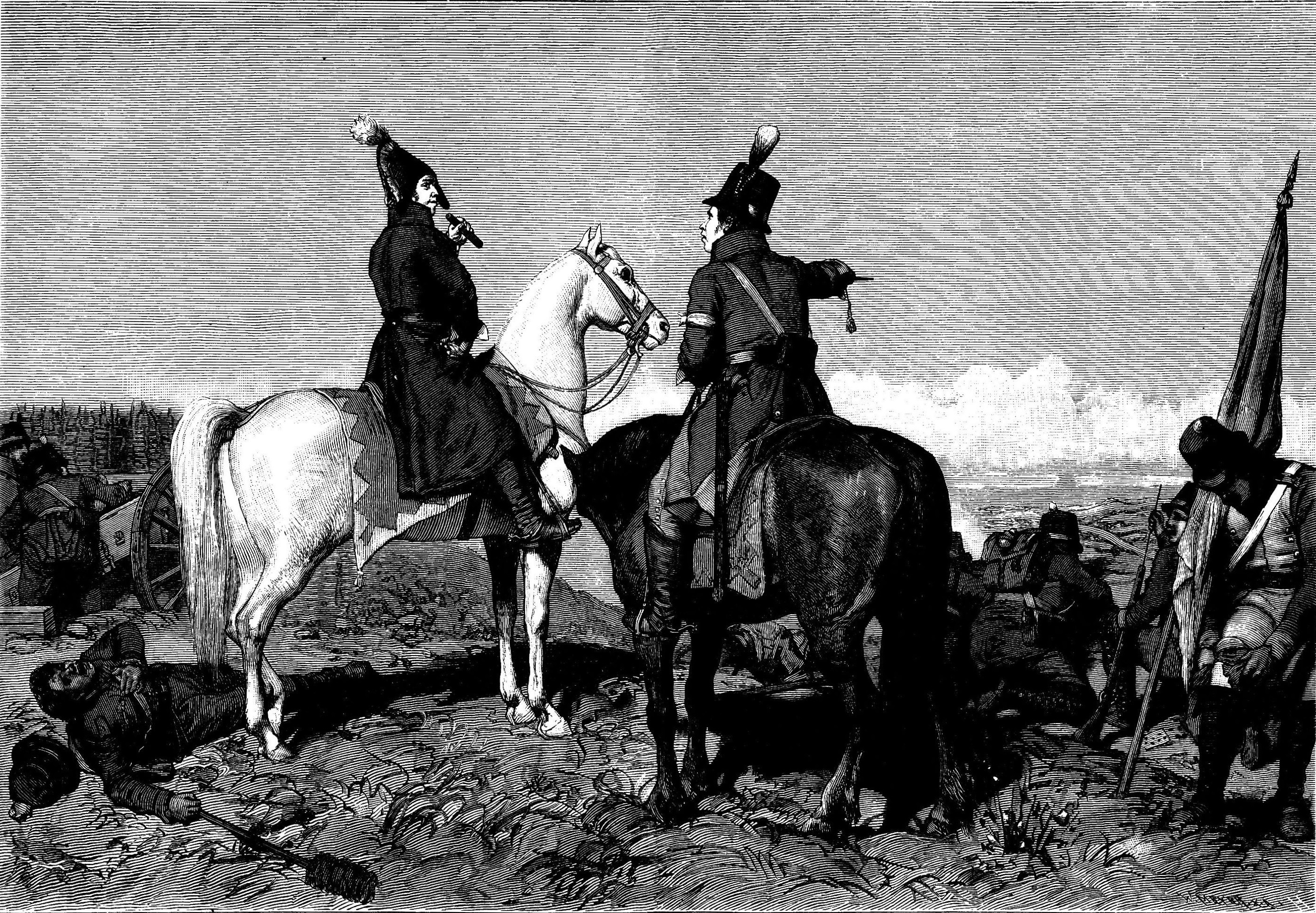
- Sandels at Koljonvirta, by August Malmström
Date	27 October 1808
Location	near Idensalmi, northern Savonia, Finland
Result	Swedish victory

Belligerents
Sweden	Russian Empire

Commanders and leaders
Johan August Sandels	(Russian Empire) Nikolay Tuchkov (Russian Empire) Mikhail Dolgorukov †

Strength
Swedish accounts: 1,200–1,800 Russian accounts: 4,000	Russian accounts: 5,000–6,000 Swedish accounts: 7,000–8,000

Casualties and losses
Swedish accounts: 312–316	Russian accounts: 764–773 Swedish accounts: 1,106

The Battle of Koljonvirta (Finnish: Koljonvirran taistelu, Swedish: Slaget vid Virta bro) i.e. the Battle of the Virta Bridge, also known as the battle of Idensalmi (Russian: Иденсальмское сражение), was fought between Swedish and Russian troops on October 27, 1808, in the course of Finnish War, with the Swedes prevailed in the engagement despite Russian numerical advantage.

The Swedish force consisted of troops from Savolax and Östergötland. After the main Swedish army had been defeated at the Battle of Oravais the army under Johan August Sandels in Savonia had to retreat in order not to be outflanked by the Russians. Sandels found a good defensive position north of Idensalmi (now Iisalmi) and decided to resist the Russian advance there. The Russians were led by Lieutenant General Nikolay Alexeyevich Tuchkov, who was bringing his troops to the Idensalmi strait,—towards Sandels' position locations.

== The battle ==
Between September 29 and October 27 a cease-fire was in effect. Sandels was heavily outnumbered but had a good defensive position between two lakes connected by the Koljonvirta river and he had prepared his position well during the cease-fire. On October 27 the cease-fire was to end at 1 PM, but Russians started their attack a little earlier, perhaps because of the time difference between Sweden and Russia.

Firstly, only the vanguard of Adjutant General Prince M. P. Dolgorukov pressed the Swedes. Sandels pulled back the forces on the south side of the river and the Russians attacked over the partially demolished bridge, exposing themselves to musket- and grapeshot fire. By the time the Russians managed to cross the bridge with Navaginsky and Tenginsky regiments, Navaginsky jaegers moved forward and the Tenginsky moved to the left, not allowing the Swedes to cut the Russians off the bridge. Major Obernibesov and Captain Rushnov were the first to break into Swedish trenches, but that was the end of Russian success. The Swedes counter-attacked in columns, using bayonets, and literally pushed the Russian troops into the river.—Both the Tenginsky and the Navaginsky retreated to the bridge, got mixed up and crossed over to their own side in great disorder. The Swedes stopped. The Russians pulled up fresh troops in the form of Reval and Azov regiments (with batteries) on the south side of the river, but N. Tuchkov did not dare to attack again, limited to an artillery exchange of fire. The battle was the last Swedish victory on Finnish soil.

=== Casualties ===
Koljonvirta — one of the most successful engagements for the Swedes in this war. The Swedes had between 1,200 and 1,800 men present with 12 guns; or 4,000 men according to Russian accounts. The Russians attacked with between 5,000 and 6,000 men; taking in consideration the Russian muster roll of 1 November, above 5,800 men were present at the battle if its losses are applied. According to Swedish sources, the Russians had between 7,000 and 8,000 men with 17 guns. The Swedes suffered 34 killed and 282 wounded, compared to 221 killed, 479 wounded and 73 captured Russians, or 764 killed and missing. Swedish sources estimate their losses to over 1,000 NCOs and privates, and 32 officers killed or wounded, as well as 72 NCOs and privates and two officers captured.

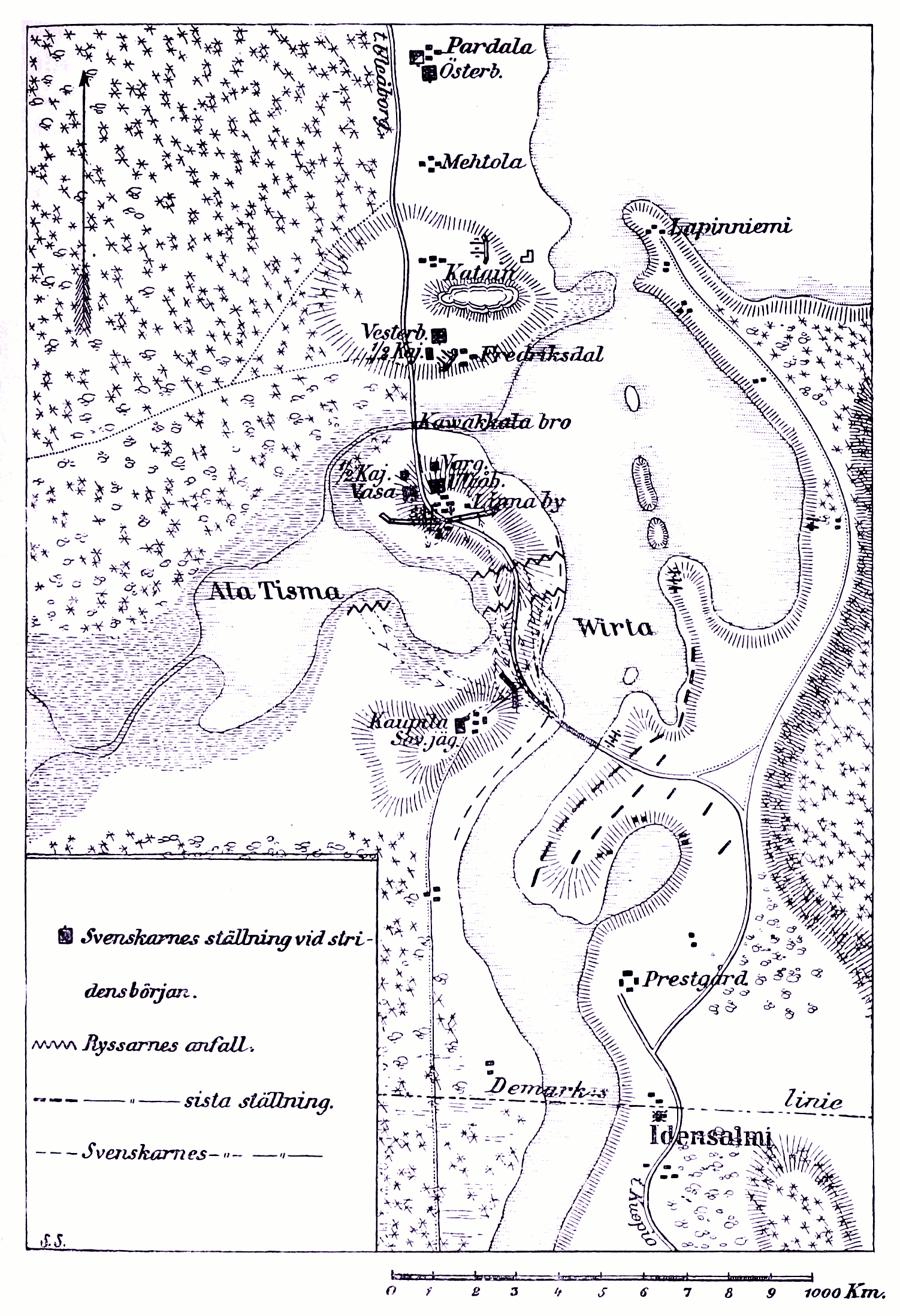
Positions at the battle

== See also ==
- Sven Dufva

== Citations and sources ==
=== Sources ===
- Hornborg, Eirik (1955). När riket sprängdes: fälttågen i Finland och Västerbotten, 1808-1809 (in Swedish). Stockholm: P. A. Norstedts och Söners Förlag.
- Generalstaben, Krigshistoriska avdelningen (1910). Sveriges krig åren 1808 och 1809, Volume 5 (in Swedish). Stockholm: Kongl. boktryckeriet P. A. Norstedt & söner.
- "Иденсальми". Military Encyclopedia: In 18 Volumes. 1911–1915.
