= Öre River =

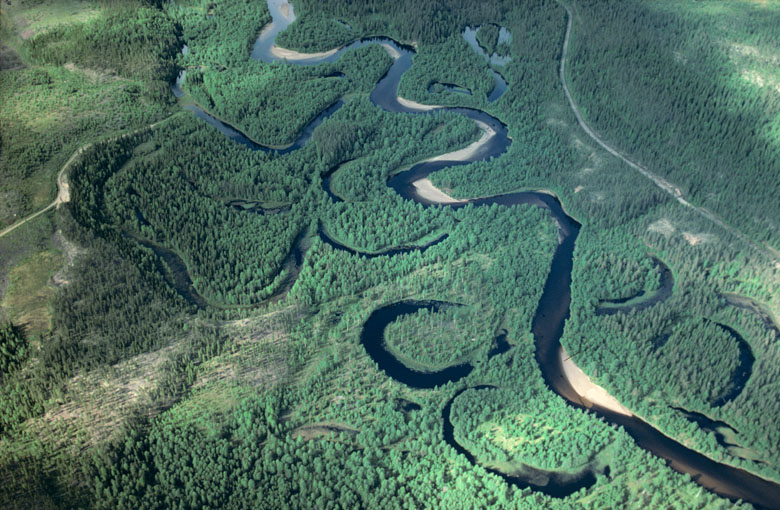
- Native name: Öreälven (Swedish); Öre älv (Swedish)

Location
- Country: Sweden
- County: Västerbotten

Physical characteristics
- Mouth: Gulf of Bothnia
  - coordinates: 63°31′N 19°44′E
  - elevation: 0 m (0 ft)
- Length: 225 km (140 mi)
- Basin size: 3,028.9 km^{2} (1,169.5 sq mi)
- Discharge
  - average: 35 m^{3}/s (1,200 cu ft/s)

Öre River (Swedish: Öreälven or Öre älv) is a river in Västerbotten County, Sweden.
