= Johan August Sandels =

Swedish field marshal (1764–1831)

Field Marshal Count Johan August Sandels
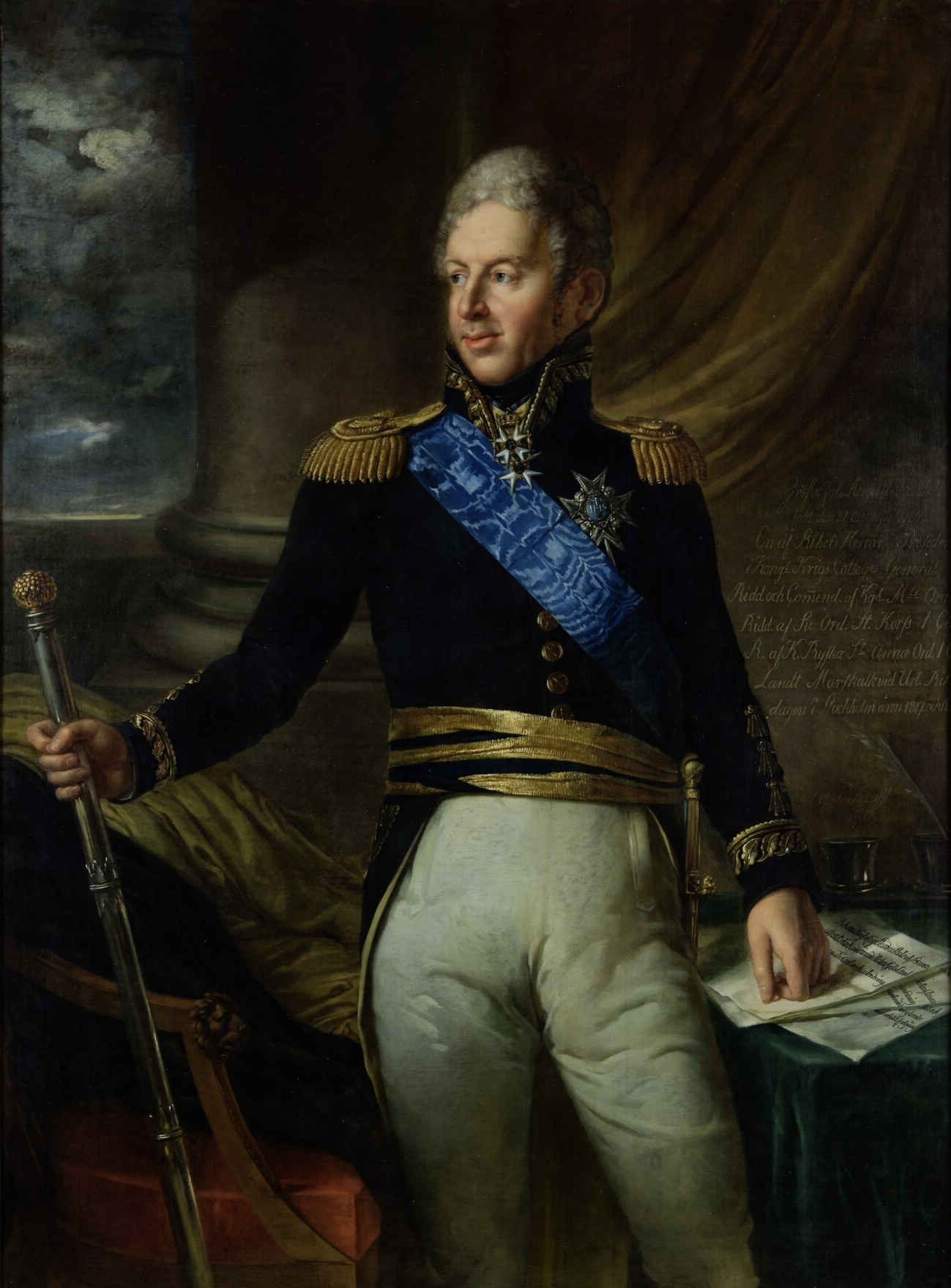
- Portrait by Per Krafft the Younger, 1819
- Born: 31 August 1764; Stockholm, Sweden
- Died: 22 January 1831 (aged 66); Stockholm, Sweden
- Burial place: Klara Church
- Spouse: Ulrika Elisabeth Hermelin
- Children: 6
- Military career
- Allegiance: Sweden
- Branch: Swedish Army
- Service years: 1775–1827
- Rank: Field Marshal
- Conflicts: Finnish War; Battle of Pulkkila; Toivala Expedition; Battle of Koljonvirta; Battle of Hörnefors; War of the Sixth Coalition; Combat of Roßlau
- Awards: Royal Order of the Seraphim; Commander with the Great Cross of the Order of the Sword; Knight with the Great Cross of the Order of the Sword; Lord of the Realm
- Other work: Governor-general of Norway

Signature
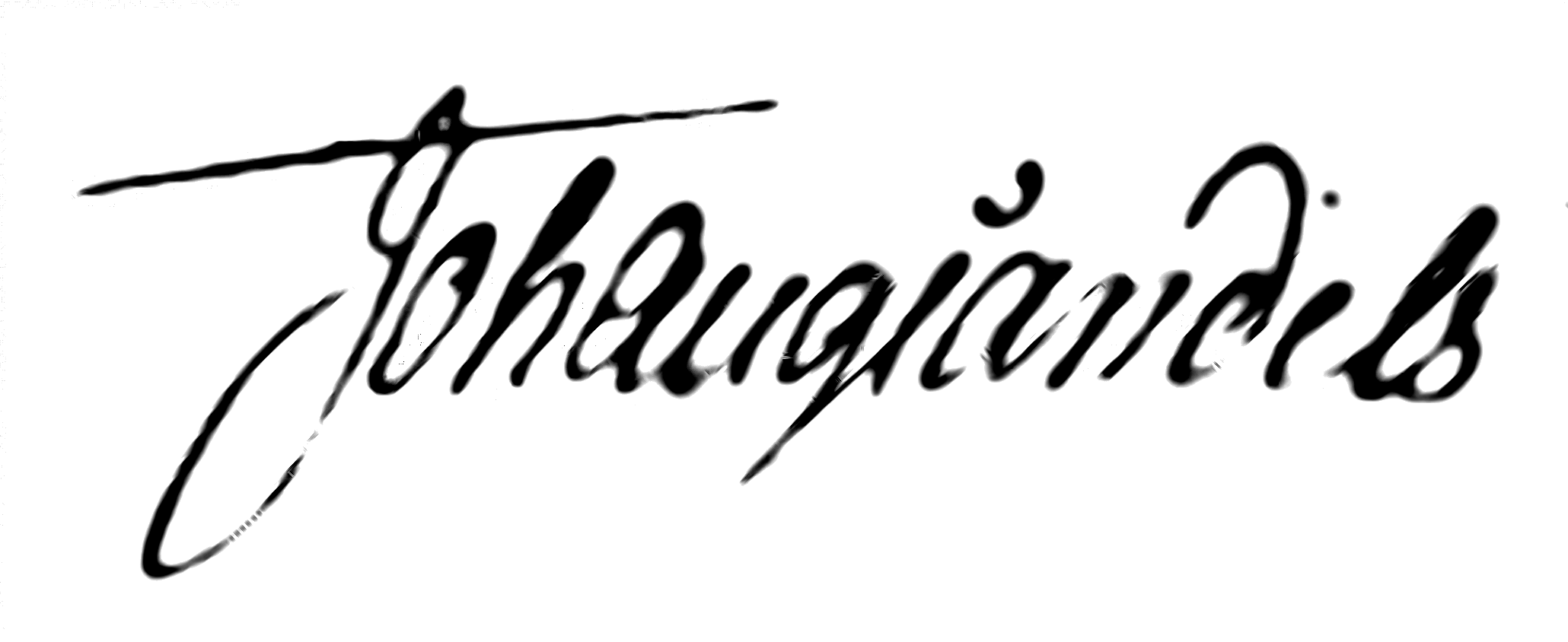

Count Johan August Sandels (31 August 1764 – 22 January 1831) was a Swedish Army officer and politician who was appointed governor-general of Norway (Riksståthållare in Swedish, Rigsstatholder in Dano-Norwegian) in 1818 and Field Marshal in 1824. He also served as acting governor of Stockholm in 1815.

== Biography ==
Sandels was born in Stockholm. He began his military career as a cadet at the artillery regiment in 1775 and rose rapidly through the ranks, serving in Gustav III's Russian War and later becoming commander of the Savolax Infantry Regiment in 1803.

=== Finnish War ===
In the Finnish War (1808–1809), Sandels commanded the Fifth Brigade and distinguished himself through a series of offensive and defensive operations in Savo and Karelia. His most celebrated achievement was the Battle of Koljonvirta on 27 October 1808. Facing a Russian force of some 8,000 men under General Tutjkov — more than four times his own strength of around 1,800 — Sandels had carefully chosen and fortified his position at the Koljonvirta strait. When the Russians launched their assault, his troops briefly fell back before Sandels ordered a well-timed counterattack that drove the Russians back across the bridge and into the river, inflicting losses of around 1,000 men including Prince Dolgoruky himself.

These events were later retold in the series of epic poems by Johan Ludvig Runeberg. Runeberg's poem portrays Sandels as an aristocratic gourmand continuing his meal while the battle begins, raising only when accused of cowardice before riding to drive back the enemy. This portrait of Sandels as a self-centred officer indifferent to his men is likely not an accurate depiction of the actual commander.

Sandels also fought in Västerbotten in 1809, where he was defeated at the Battle of Hörnefors but subsequently recaptured Umeå.

=== Later career ===
Sandels fought in the Swedish ranks against Napoleon during the War of the Sixth Coalition in 1813 and 1814, and received donation lands in Swedish Pomerania for his services.

He was appointed Governor-general of Norway in 1818, a demanding post since Norway had been forced by arms into a personal union with Sweden. Sandels managed the difficult role through personal charm and diplomatic skill, generally succeeding in handling disputes without letting them escalate into open confrontations. He was promoted to Field Marshal — the last in Swedish history — in 1824 and left his post in 1827.

== Finnish beer brand ==
Sandels is a beer brewed by Olvi since 1971. Humorous stories about Colonel Sandels (and his love of beer and food) are printed on the back label. Sandels was named the top rated beer brand in Finland in a 2015 study.

== See also ==
- The Tales of Ensign Stål

Preceded by Carl Carlsson Mörner	Governor-general of Norway; 1818–1827	Succeeded by Baltzar von Platen
