= Hörnefors =

- Location within Västerbotten Location within Sweden
- Coordinates: 63°37′N 19°55′E
- Country: Sweden
- Province: Västerbotten and Ångermanland
- County: Västerbotten County
- Municipality: Umeå Municipality

Area
  - Total: 2.72 km^{2} (1.05 sq mi)

Population (31 December 2010)
  - Total: 2,542
  - Density: 934/km^{2} (2,420/sq mi)
- Time zone: UTC+1 (CET)
  - Summer (DST): UTC+2 (CEST)

Hörnefors (Swedish pronunciation: [hœɳɛˈfɔʂː]) is a locality situated in Umeå Municipality, Västerbotten County, Sweden with 2,542 inhabitants in 2010.
