= Hans Gram Holst =

- Born: 3 September 1744; Nordby in Idd, Norway
- Died: 1 December 1815 (aged 71); Nordby in Idd, Norway
- Military career
- Allegiance: Denmark–Norway
- Branch: Army
- Service years: 1752–1811
- Rank: Major-General
- Commands: Commandant at Fredrikstad Fortress
- Conflicts: Theater War; Dano-Swedish War of 1808–1809
- Awards: Order of the Dannebrog

Major-General Hans Gram Holst (3 September 1744 – 1 December 1815) was a Royal Dano-Norwegian Army officer.

== Military career ==
Hans Gram Holst became a Sergeant at 1st Smaalenske Infantry Regiment on 13 March 1752. Later he was promoted to lieutenant of the same regiment in 1759 and finally second lieutenant on 11 November 1761. In 1762 he participated with his regiment in Mecklenburg, before being transferred to the Western Rakkestadske Company and promoted to first lieutenant. On 1 July 1767 he was again transferred, this time to 1st Akershusiske Regiment, and on 1 May 1769, he moved on to the Søndenfjeldske Infantry Regiment. There he became captain and Company Commander on 7 October 1778.

During the Theater War, Holst worked as Commander of the 1st Trondheim Grenade Battalion, and after the war he was transferred back to the Søndenfjeldske Infantry Regiment where he received the rank of major. On 1 June 1798 he became lieutenant colonel, and later colonel and Commander of the Søndenfjeldske Infantry Regiment from 22 March 1805.

In 1805 he became interim commander in Fredrikstad for a short period. During the Dano-Swedish War of 1808-1809 he became head of the right-wing brigade with approximately 3,400 men in the area from Svinesund to Rødenes, where he distinguished himself in the skirmishes at Høland and Aurskog. On 30 June 1808 Holst was promoted to major general and in 1809 he received the Order of the Dannebrog.

He was Commandant in Fredrikstad from 25 September 1809 to early March 1811, when he was ordered to Fredriksværn.

== Marriage and children ==
Holst was married in 1772 to Isabella Dorothea Leganger, daughter of the dean in Aremark. She died on 14 January 1809 at Idd, and one of their children, Major General Johan Hübner Holst, left Norway the following year together with Prince Christian August of Augustenborg, who had been elected Swedish crown prince, and went into the Swedish military service.

== Death ==
Hans Gram Holst received resignation from the army on 19 March 1811, probably because his son had joined the Swedish army and later also would participate in the Swedish campaign against Norway in 1814.

Holst died on Nordby in Idd on 1 December 1815.

Preceded by Salomon Gedde	Commandant at Fredrikstad Fortress; 1809-1811	Succeeded by Nicolai Henrik Mecklenburg
