= Øymark =

Former municipality in Østfold, Norway

Coordinates: 59.4200°N 11.6639°E

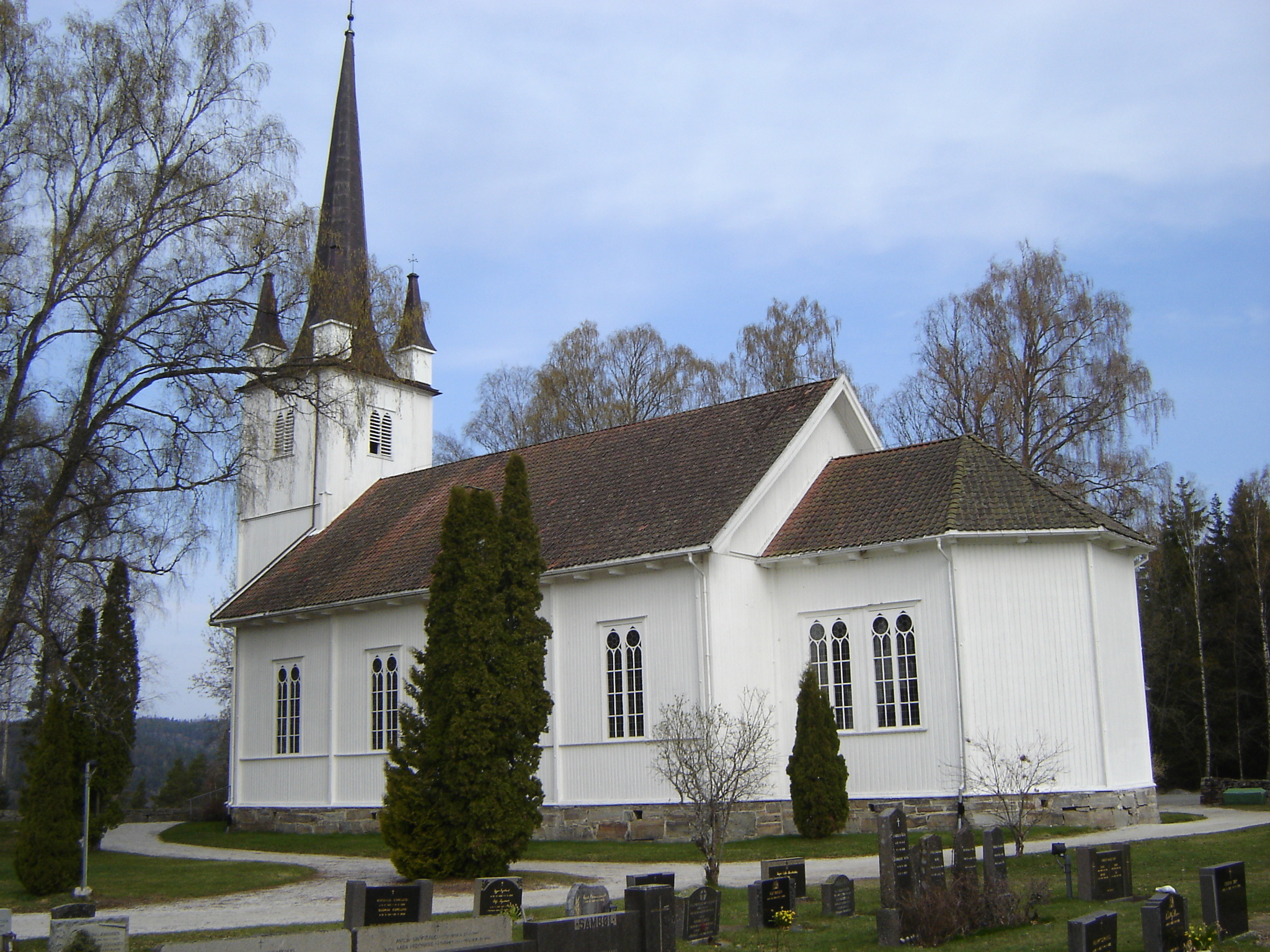
Øymark Church

Øymark is a former municipality now located in Marker municipality in Østfold county, Norway.

Øymark was originally a part of Aremark formannskapsdistrikt (from 1837), but on 1 July 1903 Øymark was separated from Aremark to form a separate municipality. At that point Øymark had a population of 1,832. On 1 January 1964 Øymark was merged with Rødenes to form the new municipality of Marker. Before the merger Øymark had a population of 2,091.

== The name ==
The Norse form of the name was Øyjamǫrk. The first element is (probably) the genitive case of the old name of Øymarksjøen (Norse *Øyi), the last element is mǫrk 'woodland, borderland'. The old name of the lake is derived from øy 'flat and fertile land along a waterside'.

An older (Danish) spelling of the name was "Ømark", this was changed to Øymark in 1918.
