= Lowzow =

Lowzow is a surname. It may refer to:

- Carl Fredrik Lowzow (1927–2009), Norwegian politician
- Christopher Frederik Lowzow (1752–1829), Danish-Norwegian army officer
- Haakon Ditlev Lowzow (1854–1915), Norwegian military officer and politician
- Wenche Lowzow (1926–2016), Norwegian politician, MP and LGBT activist
