= Andreas Samuel Krebs =

Colonel Andreas Samuel Krebs
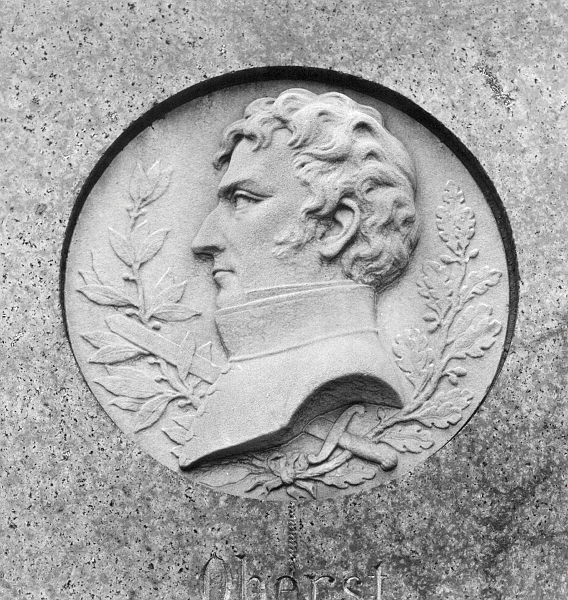
- Born: Andreas Samuel Krebs; 10 March 1766; Tønder, Sønderjylland, Denmark
- Died: 28 March 1818 (aged 52); Christiania, Norway
- Military career
- Allegiance: Denmark–Norway; Kingdom of Norway; Sweden–Norway
- Service years: 1779–1818
- Rank: Colonel
- Nicknames: The Hero from Lier and Matrand
- Conflicts: Theatre War; Dano-Swedish War (1808–1809); Battle of Rødenes; Battle of Berby; Swedish-Norwegian War; Battle of Lier; Battle of Matrand
- Awards: Order of the Dannebrog

Andreas Samuel Krebs (10 March 1766 – 28 March 1818) was a Danish-Norwegian army officer.

== Early years ==
Born on 10 March 1766 at Tønder in Sønderjylland, Krebs was the son of vicar Peter Ditlev Krebs and Birgitte Marie Lutz. Originally, he was to follow in his father's footsteps and study theology, but when he showed good understanding within mathematics and science, he got a desire for a career within the military.

In order to study and prepare for his officer exam, Krebs was sent to his uncle, Professor John Heinrich Krebs. After he passed his exam, he was accepted as a cadet in 1779 and later joined the Jäger Corps in Holstein as a second lieutenant. During the Theater War in 1788, Krebs was sent to Norway and took part in the advance against Bohuslän and the victory over the Swedes at Kvistrum bridge. After the war was over Krebs joined the Norwegian jäger corps, and married Else Thyrholm Gude on 12 February 1798. In 1806 he was also promoted to major.

== Military career ==
When war once again broke out between Denmark–Norway and Sweden from 1808 to 1809, Krebs was put in direct command over the jäger corps. During the war, he distinguished himself during skirmishes at Høland, Rødenes and Berby, and was for his efforts awarded with the Order of the Dannebrog. After the war, Krebs was appointed interim commander at Kongsvinger Fortress, while he became regimental commander of the newly formed Akershus sharpshooter regiment, where he advanced to the rank of lieutenant colonel.

During the Swedish campaign against Norway in 1814, Krebs was appointed head of a division in the district around Kongsvinger. Here he successfully led the defense of Lier entrenchment, and the counter-attack that drove the Swedes back across the border at Matrand. The Norwegian victories at Lier and Matrand strengthened the morale among the Norwegian population and King Christian Frederik was sure that the fortunes of war had turned in favor of Norwegians. Although the war ended with a Swedish victory after the Convention of Moss, Krebs was hailed as the "hero from Lier and Matrand", and was considered to have saved Norway's pride in an otherwise despondently campaign. After the union between Norway and Sweden was signed, Krebs was promoted to colonel and became adjutant to Charles XIII in 1816. In 1818 Krebs was appointed commander of the 1st Akershus Brigade, but died the same year.

== Legacy ==
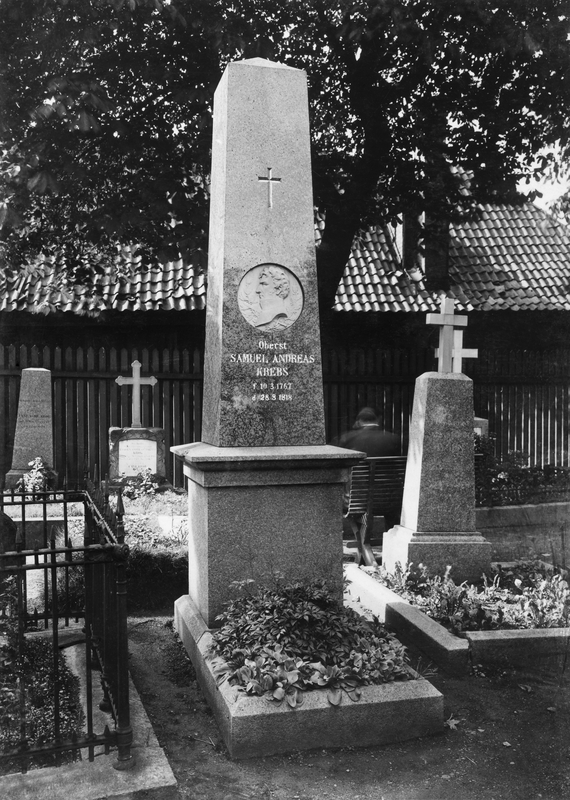
The grave memorial at Christ Cemetery in Oslo

Krebs' street (Norwegian: Krebs' gate) in Oslo was named after him in 1874, the same time as he has streets named after him in Kongsvinger and Skotterud.

In 1879 a memorial to Andreas Samuel Krebs was unveiled at Christ Cemetery in Oslo. On every 17 May (Norwegian Constitution Day) a garland is laid on the memorial by Hans Majestet Kongens Garde. This is one of the few 17 May events in the capital that has directly to do with the events that took place in 1814.
