= Niels Stockfleth Darre =

Royal Dano-Norwegian Army officer

- Born: February 18, 1765; Fåberg, Denmark-Norway
- Died: October 9, 1809
- Military career
- Allegiance: Denmark–Norway
- Branch: Norwegian Army
- Service years: 1787-1809
- Rank: Major
- Conflicts: Gunboat War; Dano-Swedish War of 1808–1809

Major Niels Stockfleth Darre (18 February 1765 – 9 October 1809) was a Royal Dano-Norwegian Army officer.

Darre was born in Fåberg as the son of Major General Michael Darre (1728–1804) and his wife Anna Christine Pram. He married Ellen Aschim.

Niels Stockfleth Darre was hired in the military cadastre authority in 1787, and eventually advanced to leader. In 1807, when the Gunboat War broke out, he was appointed aide-de-camp for the Danish Prince Christian August. In 1808, when the Dano-Swedish War broke out, Darre participated in battles with the rank of Major. On 14 September 1809 at Magnor he negotiated a temporary ceasefire with the Swedish Army. However, he died a few weeks later.
