= Johan Andreas Cornelius Ohme =

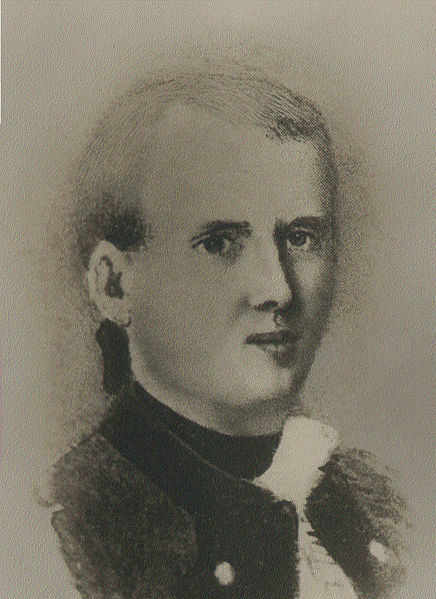
- Johan Andreas Cornelius Ohme
- Born: 1746; Holstein, Holstein-Glückstadt
- Died: 5 March 1818 (aged 71–72); Fredrikstad, Norway
- Military career
- Allegiance: Denmark–Norway; Norway; Norway
- Service years: 1764–1818
- Rank: Major general
- Commands: Commandant at Fredriksten; Commandant at Fredrikstad Fortress
- Conflicts: Dano-Swedish War (1808–1809); Swedish–Norwegian War; Siege of Fredriksten (1814)
- Awards: Order of the Sword

Johan Andreas Cornelius Ohme (1746 – 5 March 1818) was a Danish-Norwegian army officer.

== Early years ==
Johan Andreas Ohme started his military career as an artillery cadet in 1764. Nine years later he went to Denmark and was appointed second lieutenant on 4 February. But his stay in Denmark was to be short since he only a month later was sent to Norway as a first lieutenant in the 14th artillery company in Trondheim. In 1787, Ohme returned to Denmark and was promoted to captain on 23 November, and later Major on 12 June 1795.

== Military career ==
On 8 May 1805, Ohme was promoted to lieutenant colonel in the artillery, and returned to Norway as a colonel and head of the Artillery Corps on 8 February 1809. At the outbreak of the Dano-Swedish War of 1808-1809 he was put in charge of a reserve brigade in the area between Grønsund and Fetsund, and later during the war transferred to the infantry. After the war in 1809, he became interim commander at Akershus Fortress, and later commandant at Fredriksten from the 13 February 1810. He was on 25 January 1812 also promoted to major general.

During the Swedish campaign against Norway in 1814, Fredriksten fortress came under siege, and suffered under heavy bombardment. But the fortress held out and was not surrendered to the Swedes until after the Convention of Moss. Ohme was later again offered the position of commandant at Fredriksten, but turned it down.

He was, however, appointed commandant in Fredrikstad on 5 February 1815, and took over the fortress when the Swedish occupation forces pulled out. That same year he was also awarded the Order of the Sword.

== Death ==
Johan Andreas Ohme died as commandant in Fredrikstad on 5 March 1818 and was buried in the old cemetery at the Eastern Fredrikstad Church. Ohme remained unmarried, and at his death he established an endowment to the upbringing of orphan officer daughters of ages 9 to 18.

17 May 1905 it was erected a memorial over his grave, as it is placed flowers on it each 17 May (Norwegian Constitution Day).

Preceded by Prince Christian August	Commandant at Fredriksten; 1810-1815	Succeeded by Johan Hübner Holst
Preceded by Nils Christian Frederik Hals	Commandant at Fredrikstad Fortress; 1815–1818	Succeeded by Johan Georg Mejlænder
