= Ørje Fortress =

Coordinates: 59°28′55″N 11°39′4″E

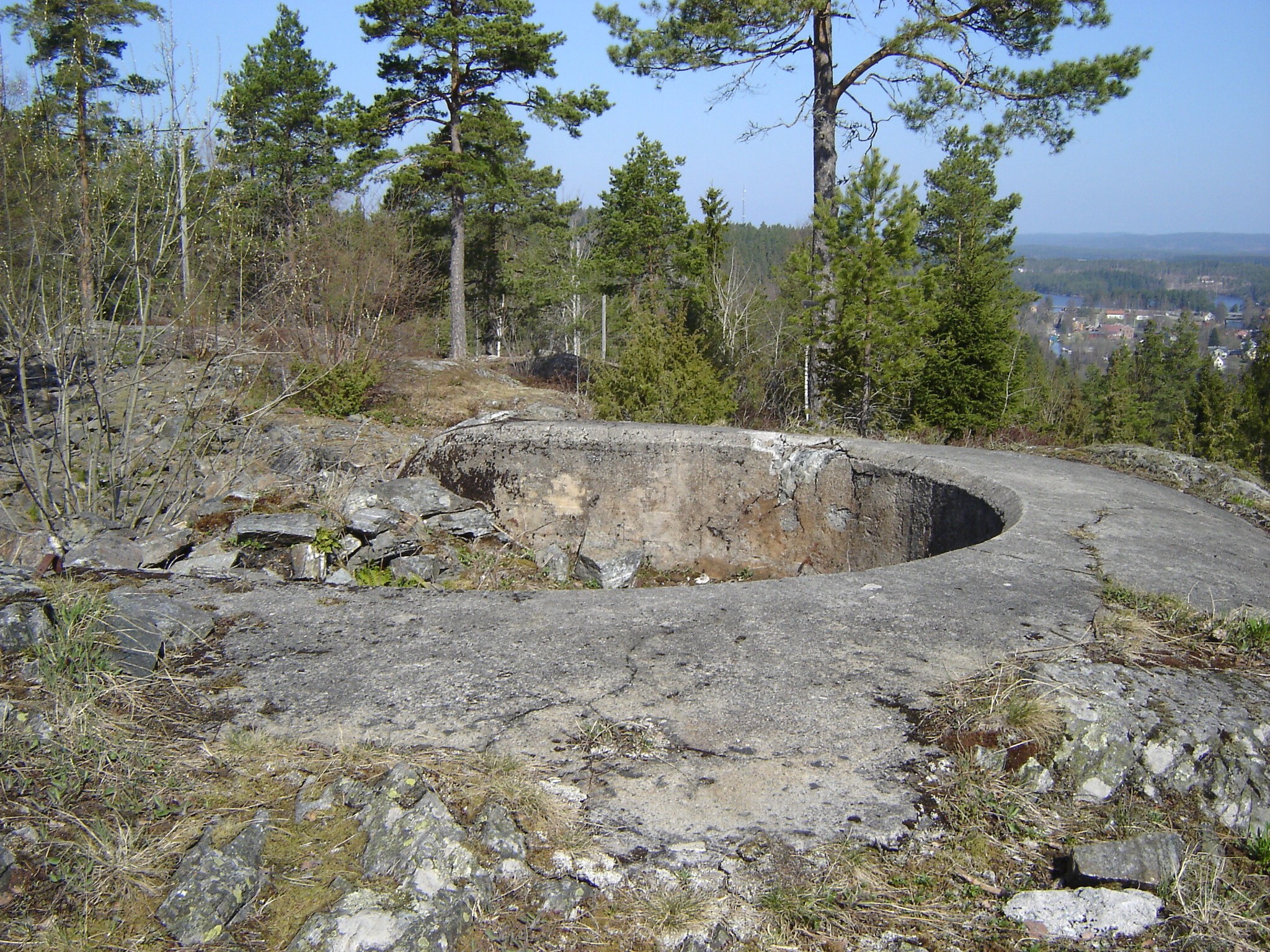
Gun position at Lihammeren

Ørje Fortress (Ørje fortene) lies in Marker municipality in Østfold county, Norway. The construction of the fort started in December 1901 and was completed the following year. The fortification guarded the heavily trafficked route through the community of Ørje, which was an important entry point from Sweden.

The fortifications consist of two parts: the northern fort and southern fort. The northern fort (Ørjekollen fort) lay southwest from the Ørje bridge and sluice (Ørje sluser) on the Halden Canal. The southern fort (Lihammeren fort) was at Likollen, 1 km further south. Both were positioned on elevated positions and were armed with four canons. Each of the forts had two 105 mm guns and two 75 mm rapid fire fortification guns.

In accordance with the Karlstad Treaty (Karlstadkonvensjonen), the forts were taken out of service and demolished in 1905. A demilitarized zone was established. The guns were dismounted and relocated to Hegra Fortress in Trøndelag. The site of the northern fort was restored and made accessible to the public in 1991. The area was cleared so that cannon positions and runways are visible.
