= Battle of Lier (1814) =

Battle of the Swedish–Norwegian War of 1814

- Part of the Swedish–Norwegian War of 1814
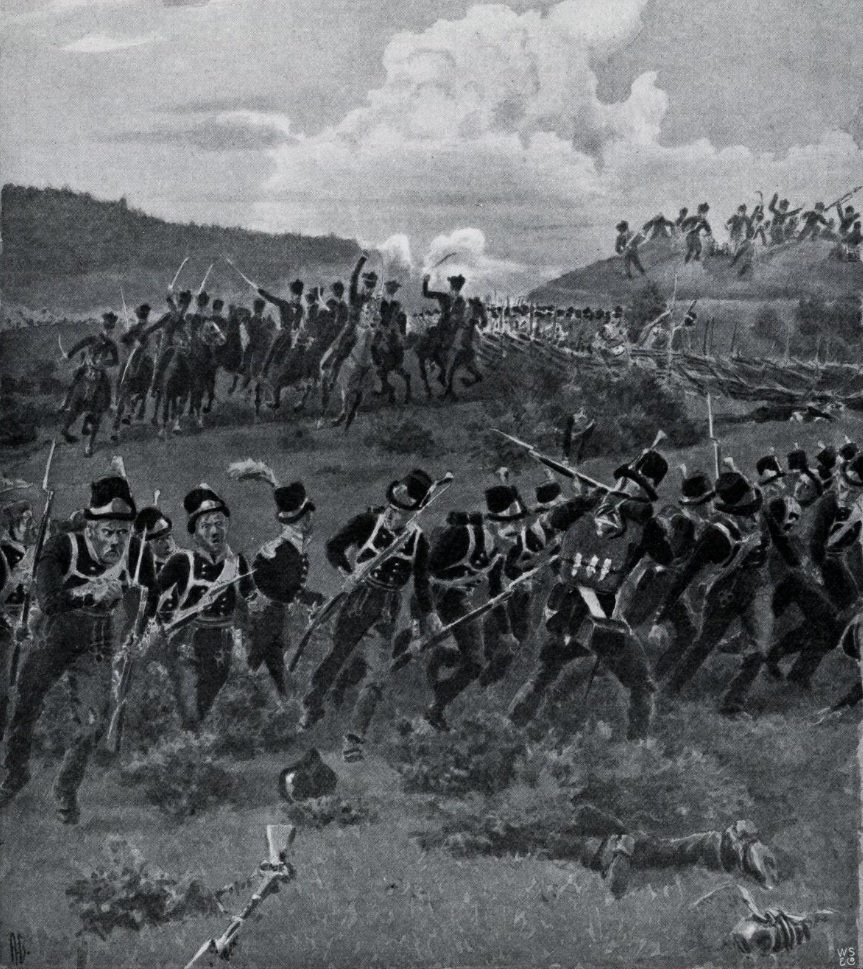
- Battle of Lier 1814, by Andreas Bloch
Date	2 August 1814
Location	Line between Eidskog and Kongsvinger, Norway 60°08′58″N 12°02′36″E
Result	Norwegian victory

Belligerents
Norway	Sweden

Commanders and leaders
(Norway) Andreas Krebs	Carl Gahn

Strength
2,500	1,400

Casualties and losses
3 killed 30 wounded	20 killed 72 wounded 8 captured

War of the Sixth Coalition:
Swedish–Norwegian War (1814)
The color black indicates the current battle.

The Battle of Lier (Norwegian: Slaget ved Lier) was fought on 2 August 1814 between Sweden and the newly independent Norway as part of the Swedish-Norwegian War of 1814. The battle was the first major action of the war, in which an outnumbered Swedish force attempted to storm the Norwegian entrenchment; the Norwegian victory served as an important part to boost morale among the Norwegian troops. This was the second time during the Napoleonic Wars that a battle had taken place at Lier, the first was in 1808.

== Swedish plan ==
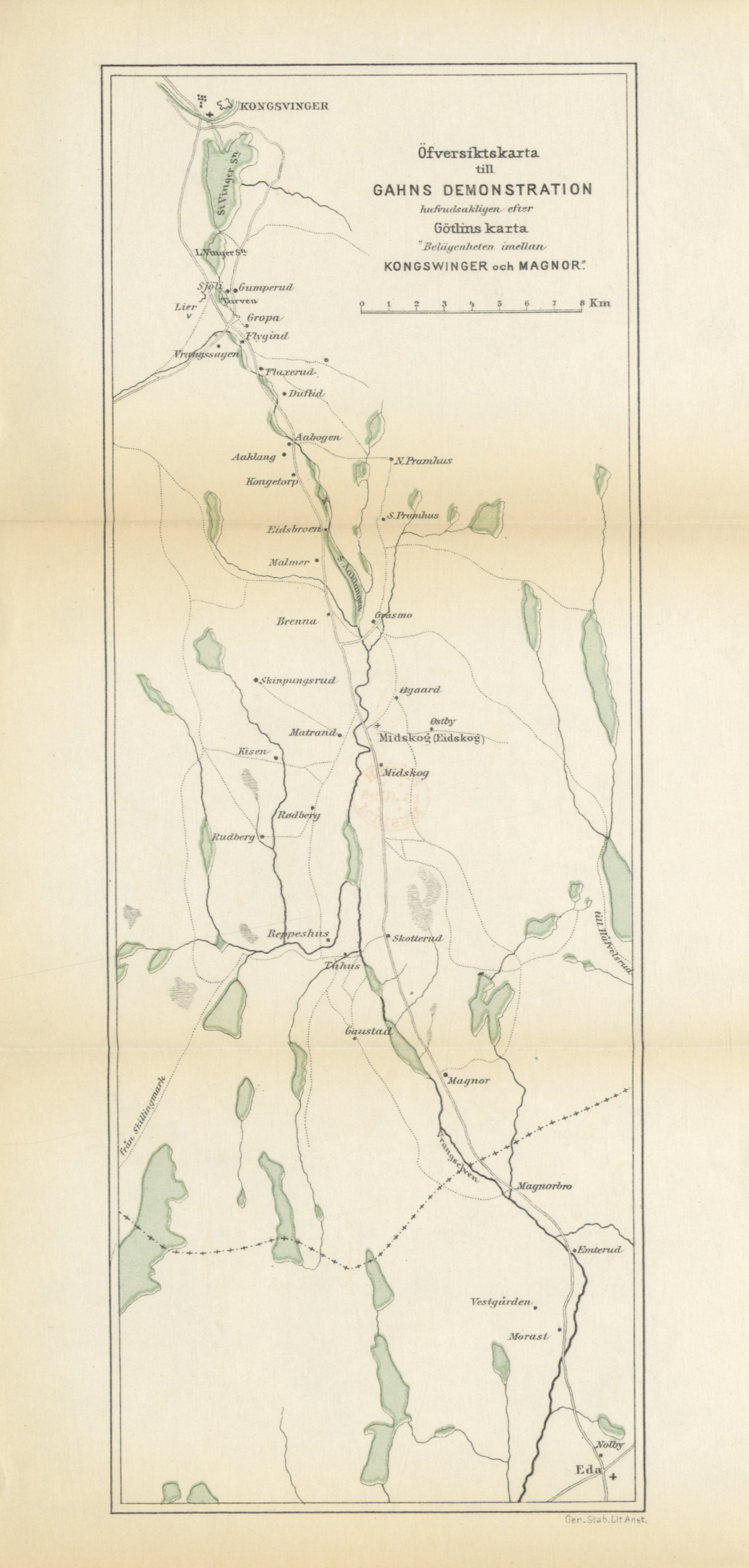
Map from 1814 showing General Gahn's plan

Major General Carl Pontus Gahn had been given the order to advance on the Norwegian fortress-city of Kongsvinger, without exposing his flanks, in order to draw Norwegian troops stationed other places in the country to Kongsvinger to defend the strategically placed town. This would leave other places in Norway temporarily weakened and give the Swedish troops an opportunity to initiate offensives elsewhere.

The plan had been worked out by Crown Prince Jean Baptiste Bernadotte.

== Background ==
On 31 July the Swedish troops, under the command of Major General Carl Pontus Gahn, crossed the Norwegian border near Eidskog. The force consisted of one Jäger and three infantry battalions from the Västerbotten Regiment, as well as one battalion from the Värmland Regiment; in all 1,500 men. This forced Christian Frederik to order troops from Høland to head to Eidskog in order to defend against the Swedish advance.

Major General Gahn's troops followed the main road towards Kongsvinger and faced early resistance from the Norwegian outposts at Matrand. But since the Norwegian vanguard was far weaker than the Swedish, they were quickly driven back and the Swedish forces camped by Brenna, Malmer and the road to Pramhus. The Norwegian vanguard retreated back to Kongetorp where they met with Lt. Colonel Andreas Samuel Krebs, who took the initiative that they would pull back to Lier entrenchment which was a much better defensive position.

== The battle ==
The Swedish forces continued their advance towards Kongsvinger on 2 August. The main column followed Kongeveien from Skotterud, while 800-900 men took the road over Pramhus. The two forces met again at Åbogen where they took a break. At 15 p.m. the Swedish troops continued their advance and split up again when they reached Flygind. Two of the companies would go from there to Tarven, a company would follow the main road, and a fourth company would go to the left of the main road towards the Lier entrenchment's right flank.

The companies that would attack Tarven quickly met the superior Norwegian troops there and had to be reinforced with a battalion. They then drove the Norwegians back until the artillery from the positions at Lier effectively intervened and the Swedish attack broke down. At the main post, the Norwegian vanguard was driven back to the Lier entrenchment, but the Swedish troops came under heavy fire when they appeared in the edge of the woods and they were too weak to attack the entrenchment. Major General Gahn then reinforced them with two companies who repeatedly tried to take the entrenchment, but were stopped every time. When the Norwegian reserves also were put in to drive the Swedish troops back the fighting died out.

At 21 p.m. the Swedish troops had almost no ammunition left, and they had failed to secure any strategic location along the road to Kongsvinger. Gahn therefore decided to retreat back to Matrand.

=== Casualties ===
The fighting at Lier had been hard, and there were far greater losses than there had been in 1808. This is undoubtedly because in 1814 there were far larger forces involved in the fighting. In particular, the Swedish forces had suffered heavy losses in relation to the Norwegians (28 men dead and missing; of which at least 8 prisoners, and 72 wounded); the reason for this may be explained by the fact that most of the Norwegian forces were firing from fortified lines, or were stationed in reserve.

== Aftermath ==
Lt. Colonel Krebs was hailed as a hero and promoted for the victory at Lier as well as the subsequent Battle of Matrand on August 5. His victories were the only ones in an otherwise despondent campaign and obtained the Norwegian envoys a valuable starting point for negotiations leading to the Swedes acceptance of the Norwegian Constituent Assembly at Eidsvoll Manor.
