= Øymarksjøen =

Lake in Norway

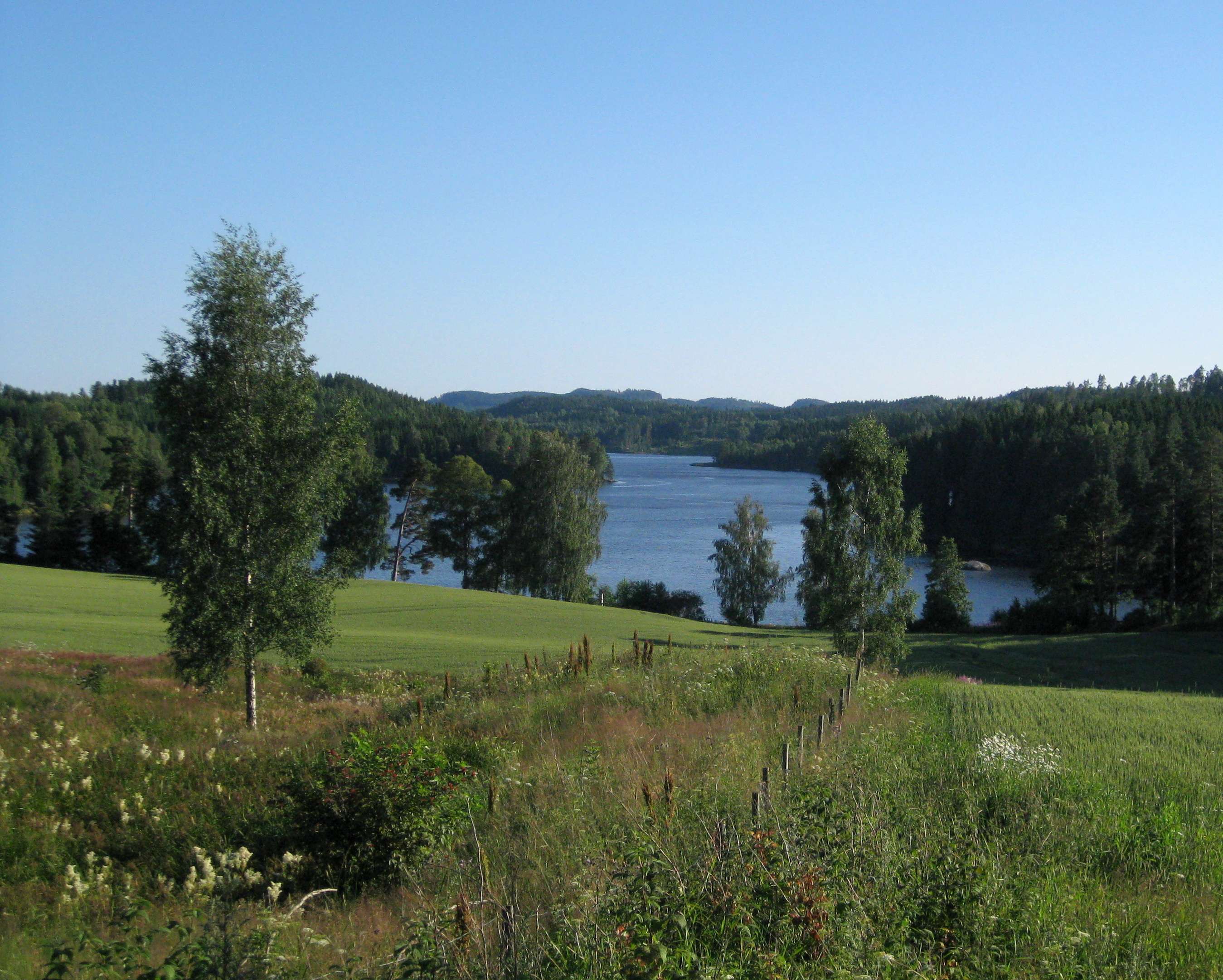

- Location within Østfold
- Location: Aremark, Marker (Østfold)
- Coordinates: 59°22′20″N 11°39′35″E
- Basin countries: Norway
- Surface area: 14.12 km^{2} (5.45 sq mi)
- Max. depth: 37.6 m (123 ft)
- Shore length^{1}: 66.18 km (41.12 mi)
- Surface elevation: 109 m (358 ft)
- References: NVE
- ^{1} Shore length is not a well-defined measure.

Øymarksjøen is a lake in the municipalities of Aremark and Marker in Østfold county, Norway.

== See also ==
- List of lakes in Norway
