= Christopher Frederik Lowzow =

Danish-Norwegian army officer

- Born: Christopher Frederik Peter Theodor Lowzow; 29 June 1752; Hvolgaard, Denmark
- Died: 30 March 1829 (aged 76); Bergen, Norway
- Military career
- Allegiance: Denmark–Norway; Norway; Norway
- Branch: Army
- Service years: 1759–1828
- Rank: Lieutenant General
- Conflicts: Theater War; Dano-Swedish War (1808–1809)
- Awards: Order of the Dannebrog

Christopher Frederik Peter Theodor Lowzow (29 June 1752 – 30 March 1829) was a Danish-Norwegian army officer.

== Early years ==
Christopher Lowzow was born on 29 June 1752 at Hvolgaard in Denmark as the son of Eiler Ditlev Lowzow (1711–1785) and Hedevig Ulrikke Pfuel (1715–1780). At the age if seven he became ensign in his father's regiment, and only to years later he was promoted to second lieutenant in the Falsterske Fodregiment. As a 23-year-old he went to Norway as Captain of the 1st Oplandske National Regiment, he would come to be associated with this regiment for 36 years, only interrupted between 1783 and 1785 when he was attached to the Life Guard Regiment Foot and Prince Frederik's Regiment. On 12 August 1784 Lowzow married Juliane Margrethe von Rappe (1760–1790).

== Military career ==
Lowzow advanced quickly through the ranks and became Major in 1785. At the outbreak of the Theater War he was given the command of a grenadier battalion, and was in the subsequent period after the war, promoted to lieutenant colonel in 1790 and colonel in 1803. When the Dano-Swedish War broke out in 1808 he was given command of a brigade and was on recommendation from Prince Christian August of Augustenborg promoted to major general the same year and awarded the Order of the Dannebrog in 1809. In 1812 he became head of Bergenhus Regiment and commandant of Bergenhus Fortress.

At Norway's separation from Denmark in 1814 he remained in Norway, but applied for dismissal. The dismissal was, however, rejected and he was instead appointed lieutenant general and commanding-general of Bergen. After the Swedish campaign against Norway, and the Convention of Moss, Lowzow became commander of the Bergenhus Brigade in 1818.

== Death ==
Lowzow chose to leave his position as commander of the Bergenhus Brigade on 24 June 1828 and died the following year.
