= Marker, Norway =

Marker Municipality Marker kommune
- Municipality
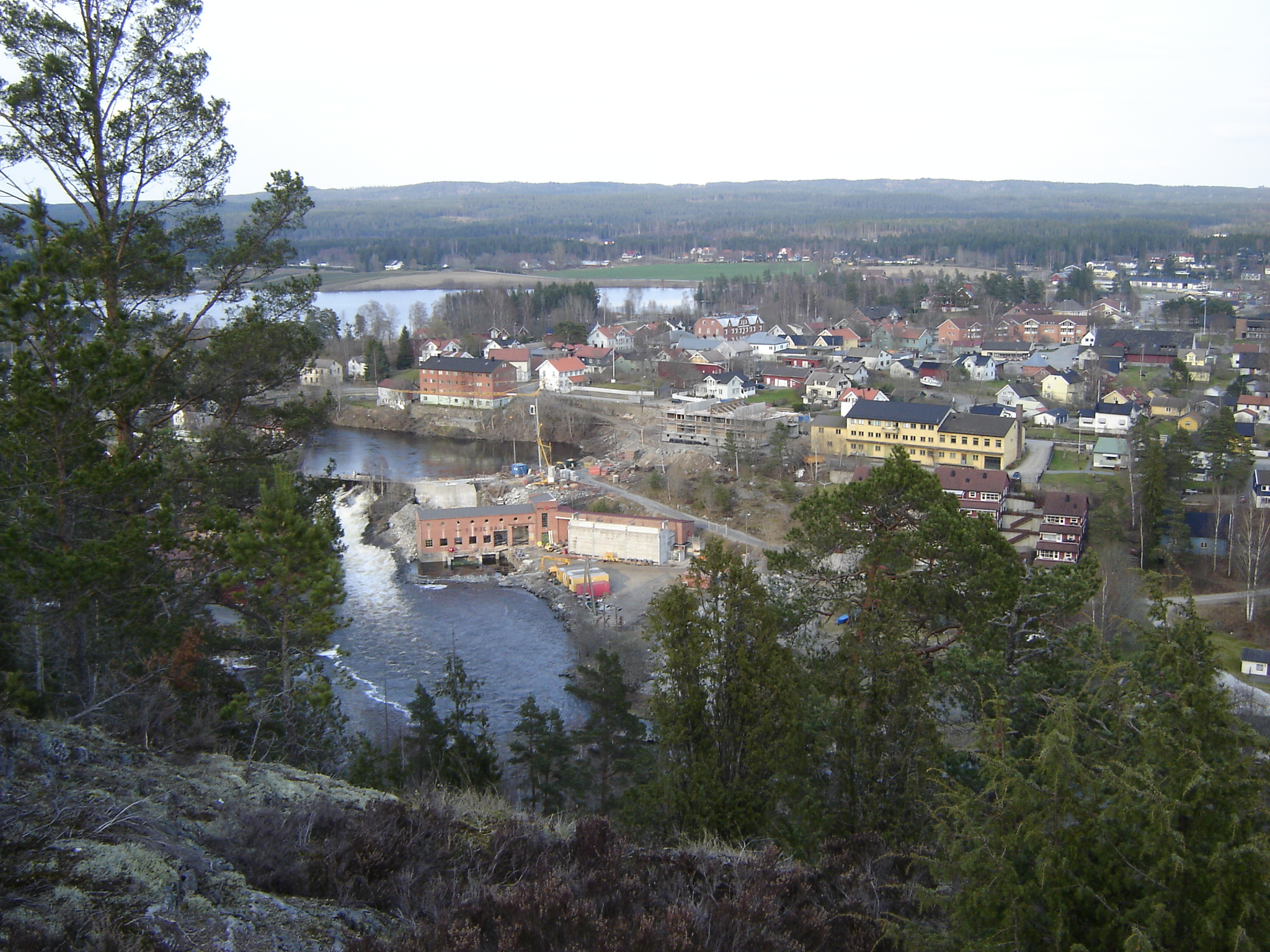

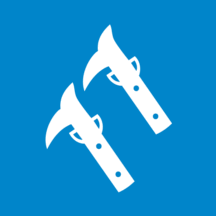
- Flag Coat of arms

- Østfold within Norway

- Marker within Østfold
- Coordinates: 59°30′40″N 11°37′42″E
- Country: Norway
- County: Østfold
- District: Smaalenene
- Administrative centre: Ørje

Government
  - Mayor (2003): Kjersti Nythe Nilsen (Ap)

Area
  - Total: 413 km^{2} (159 sq mi)
  - Land: 368 km^{2} (142 sq mi)
  - Rank: #235 in Norway

Population (2004)
  - Total: 3,409
  - Rank: #250 in Norway
  - Density: 9/km^{2} (23/sq mi)
  - Change (10 years): ▲ +2%
- Demonym: Marking

Official language
  - Norwegian form: Bokmål
- Time zone: UTC+01:00 (CET)
  - Summer (DST): UTC+02:00 (CEST)
- ISO 3166 code: NO-3122
- Website: Official website

Marker is a municipality in Østfold county, Norway. The administrative centre of the municipality is the village of Ørje. Marker was created as a new municipality on 1 January 1964 following the merger of the two former municipalities of Rødenes and Øymark.

The municipality borders Sweden, Aurskog-Høland municipality in Akershus county, and Aremark, Eidsberg, Rakkestad, and Rømskog municipalities in Østfold county. European route E18 passes through the municipality.

The municipality's biggest attractions are the fortresses at Basmo and Ørje. Basmo Fortress lies on an isolated mountain outcrop between lakes Rødenessjøen and Hemnessjøen in the northwestern part of the municipality.

== General information ==
=== Name ===
The Norse form of the name was Markir, which is the plural form of mǫrk f 'woodland, borderland' (see > March).

=== Coat-of-arms ===
Marker's coat-of-arms dates from modern times, having been granted on 16 April 1982. The arms show two white-colored trunk-hooks on a blue background. They are a type of hook, normally on a long pole, used to drive tree trunks through the rivers. The main economic activity in the municipality is forestry, hence the use of the hooks. The two hooks also represent the two villages (and former municipalities) of Rødenes and Øymark.

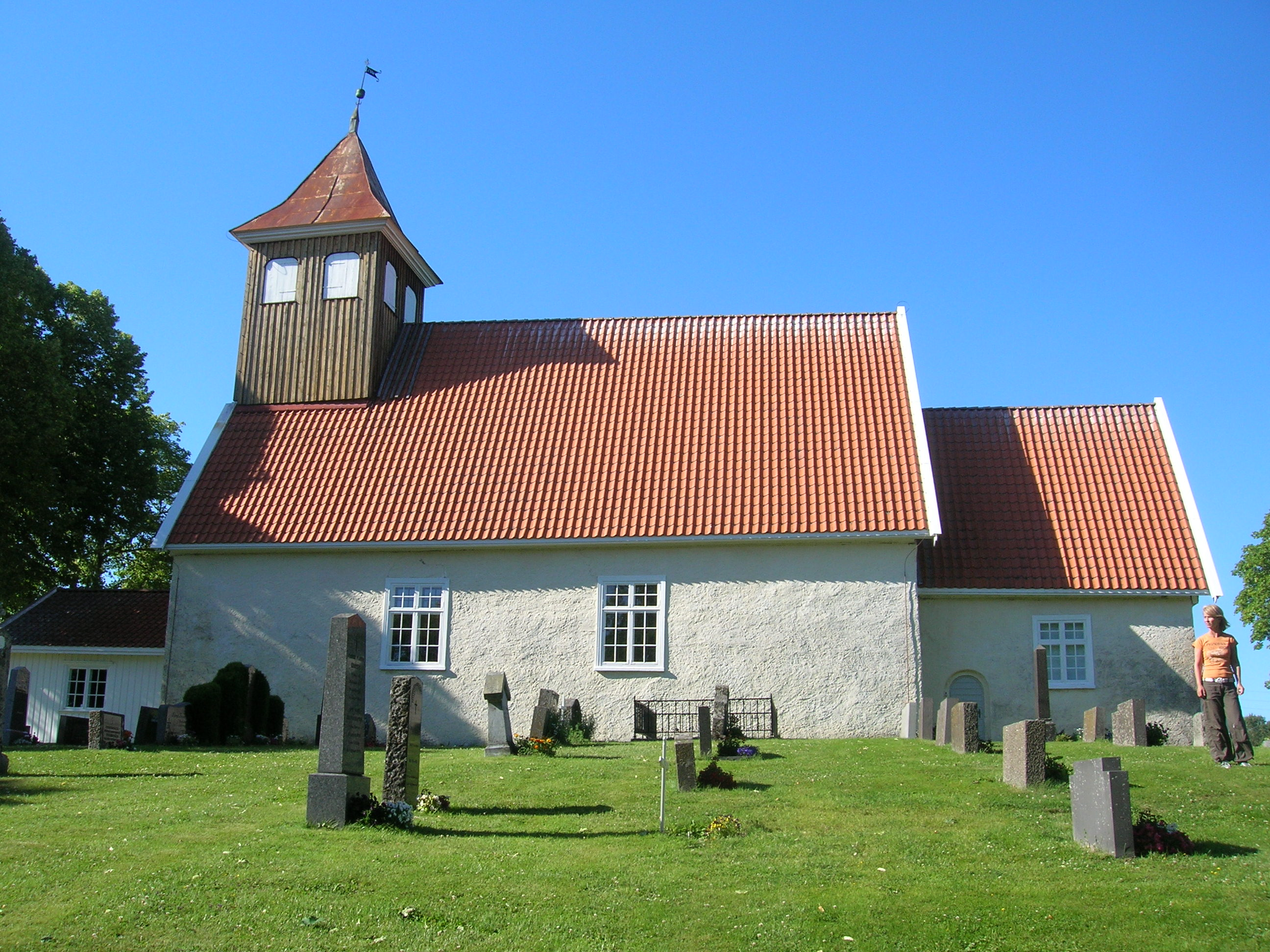
Rødenes church

=== Rødenes church ===
Rødenes church (Rødenes kirke) is a medieval-era church in the Rødenes parish of Marker. It belongs to Østre Borgesyssel deanery in the Church of Norway's Borg Diocese. The building, which is of Romanesque architectural style and dates from 1230, has a rectangular nave and a lower and narrower choir. The oaken pulpit dates from the 1600s and the altarpiece from the 1720s. The edifice is of stone and brick. The floorplan is long and has room for 240 seats. The church underwent extensive reconstruction in the years 1703–1709 and again in 1949–1952.

== Minorities ==
Number of minorities (1st and 2nd generation) in Marker by country of origin in 2020
Ancestry	Number
Sweden	71
Poland	51
Somalia	33
Thailand	15
Kosovo	14

== Notable people ==
- Thorvald Aadahl (1882 in Rødenes – 1962) a newspaper editor, novelist and playwright
- Ola Isene (1898 in Rødenes – 1973) a Norwegian baritone opera singer and actor
- Karsten Buer (1913 in Øymark – 1993) a Norwegian harness racing coach
- Ingvar Bakken (1920 in Øymark – 1982) a politician, Mayor of Øymark 1947–1963, Mayor of Marker 1963–1967

== Gallery ==
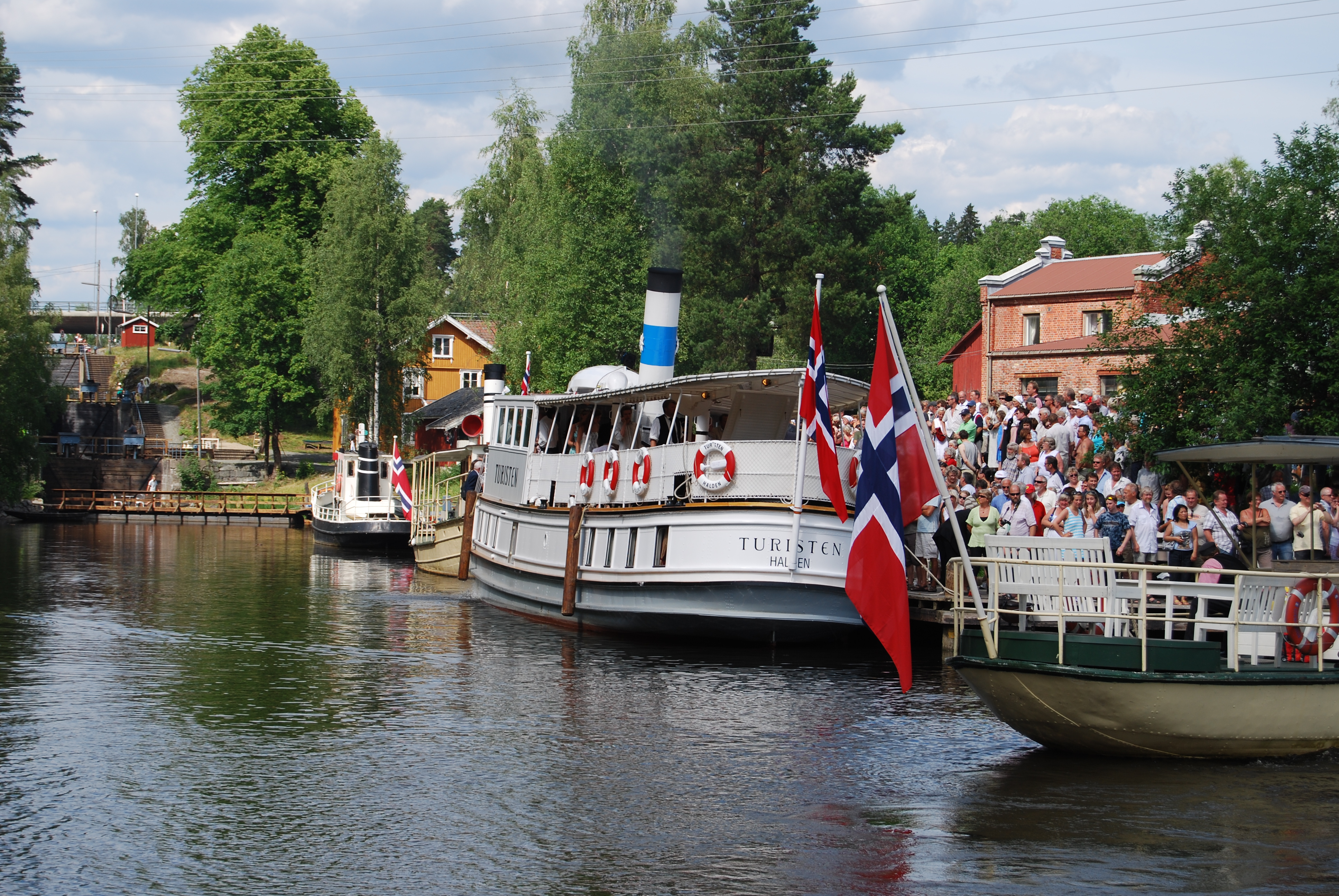
Feiring av Dronningens hjemkomst; DS Turisten

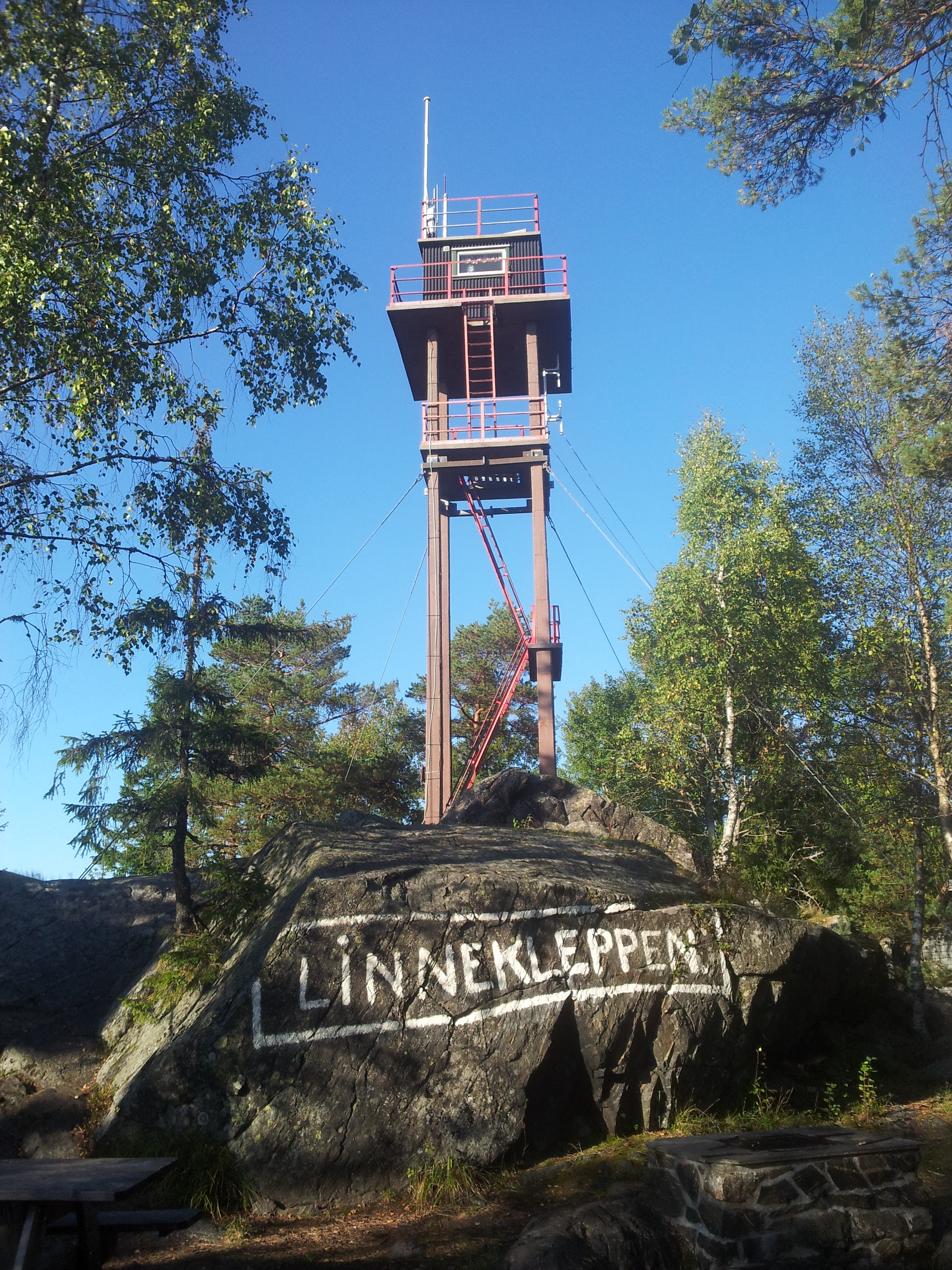
Brannvakttårnet på Linnekleppen

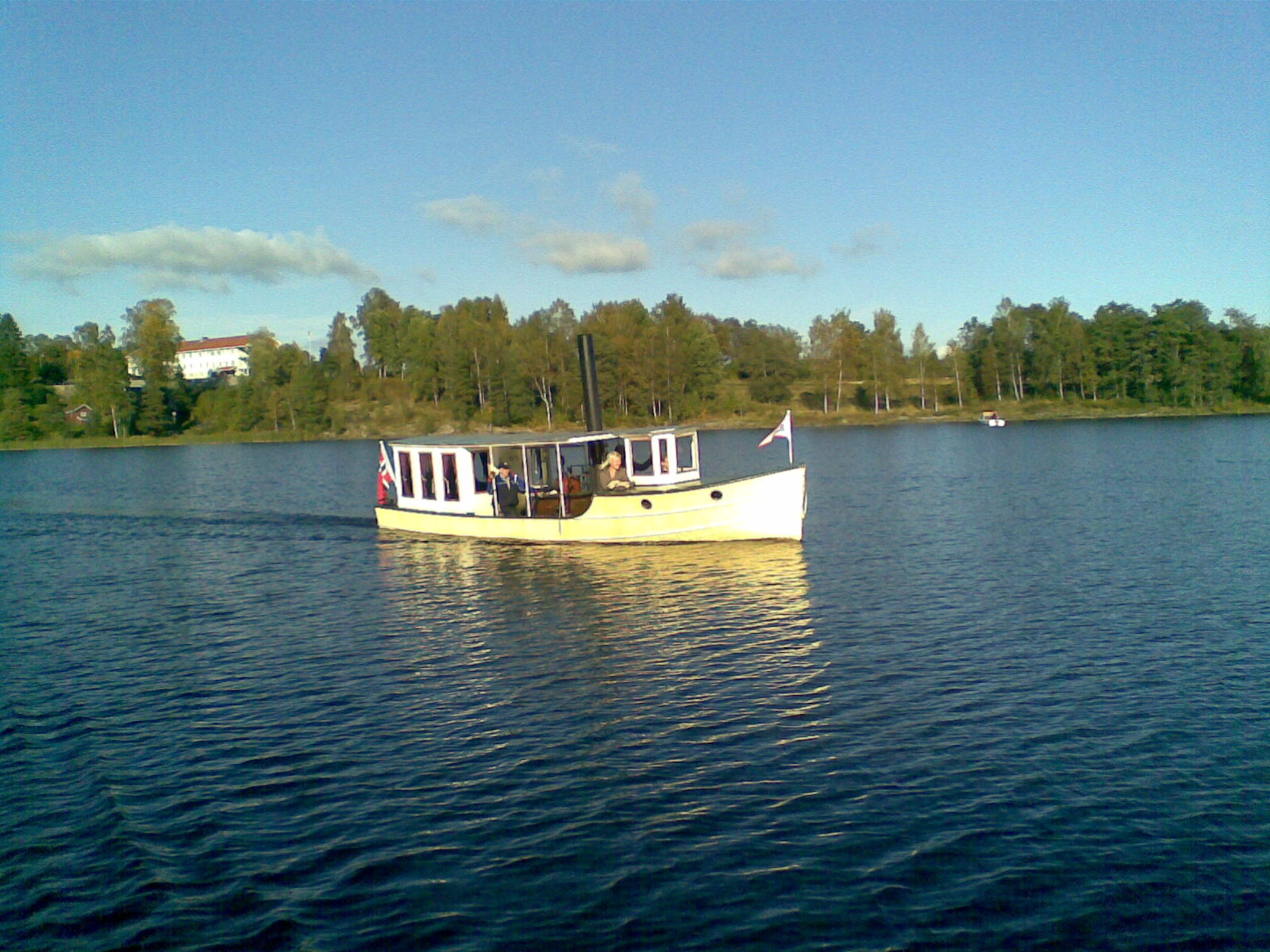
Sommer og dampbåt

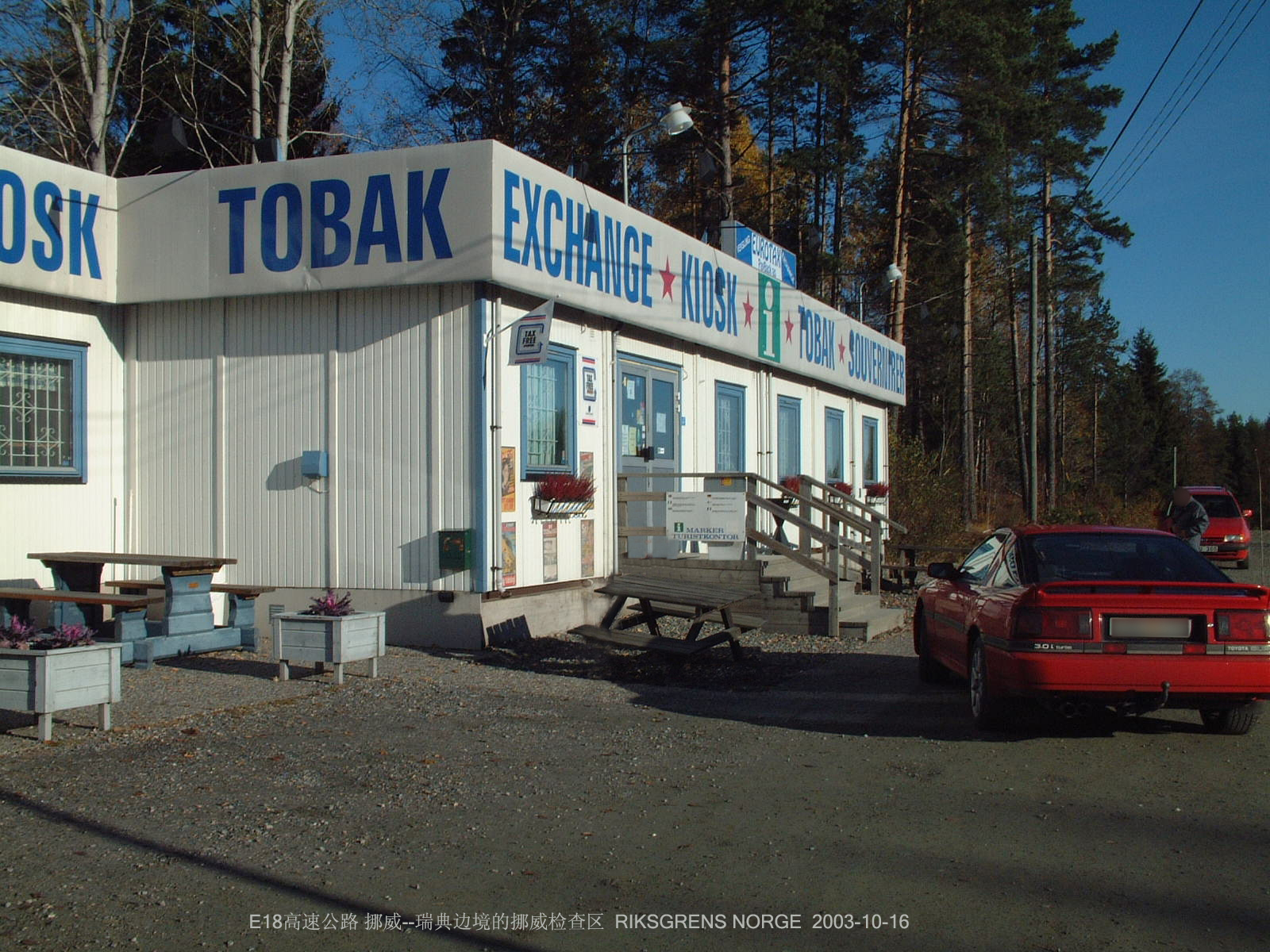
At the border of Norway & Sweden
