= Ørje =

Place in Marker, Norway

Coordinates: 59°29′N 11°39′E

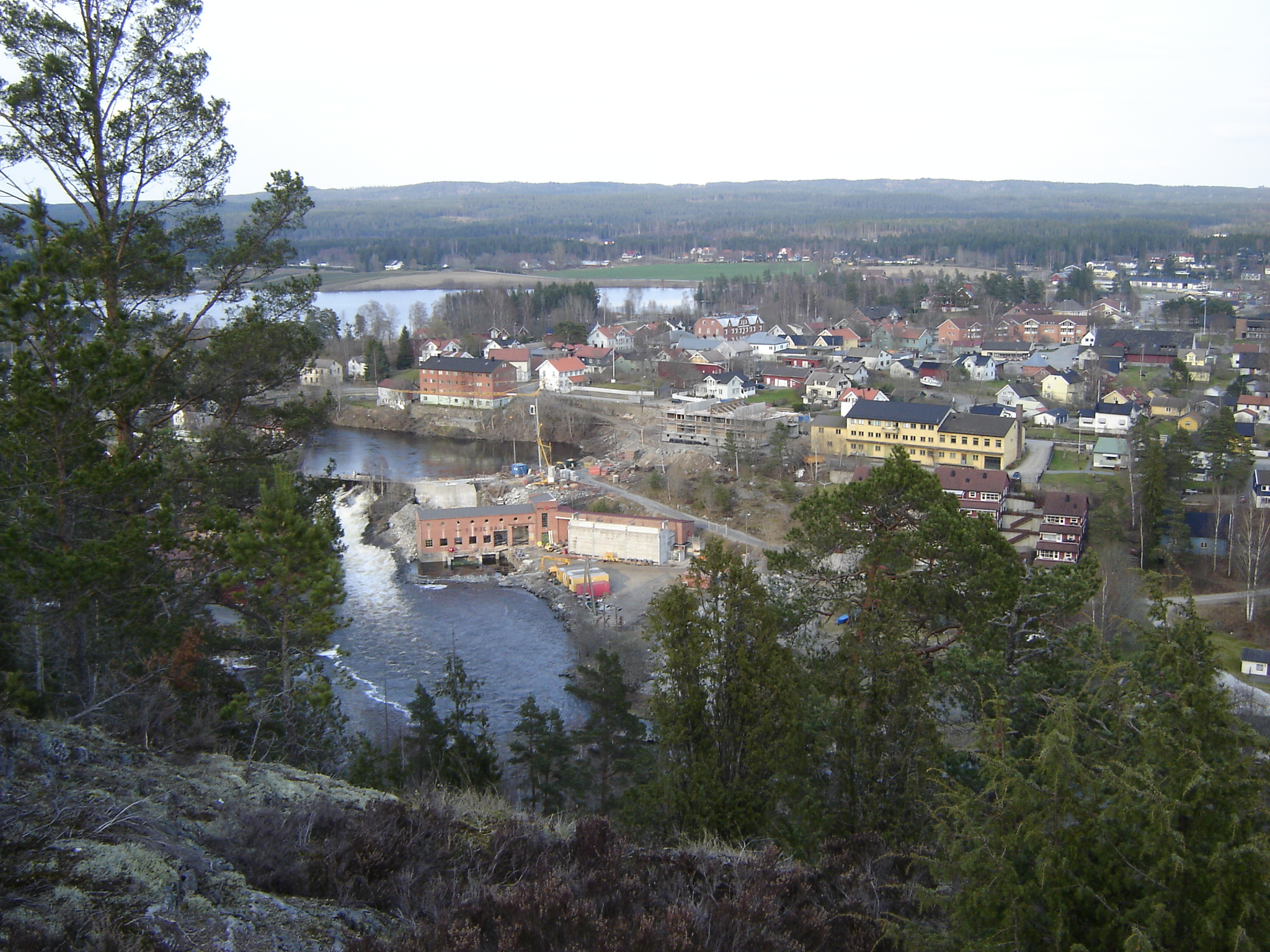
View of Ørje

Ørje is the administrative centre of Marker municipality, Norway, not far from the Swedish border. Its population (2013) is 3872

Ørje was founded in the 1880s around a timber-processing mill. Engebret Soot had built the first Norwegian canal locks at Ørje in the years 1857-1860 (no:Ørje sluser). The total lift of the locks are 10 meters (30 feet) divided on 3 steps. The locks are situated between the lakes "Rødenessjøen" and "Øymarksjøen" as a part of the Halden Canal Waterway System.

In the decades following World War II, Ørje developed substantial industry and commerce. Today, the service sector, including tourism have partly replaced manufacture and agriculture/forestry as the most important economic sectors. Ørje is known for its canal museum (Haldenvassdragets Kanalmuseum) and steamboat club, military fortifications from 1905 and locks.

Ørje has also become well-known due to a pedestrian crossing sign installed at Storgata 59 by the Swedish artists' collective Kreativiteket. The sign is based on a character from Monty Python's "Ministry of Silly Walks" sketch, and instructs pedestrians to cross the street in a silly manner.

== See also ==
- Ørje Fortress
