= Rødenes =

Former municipality in Norway

Coordinates: 59.5881°N 11.5947°E

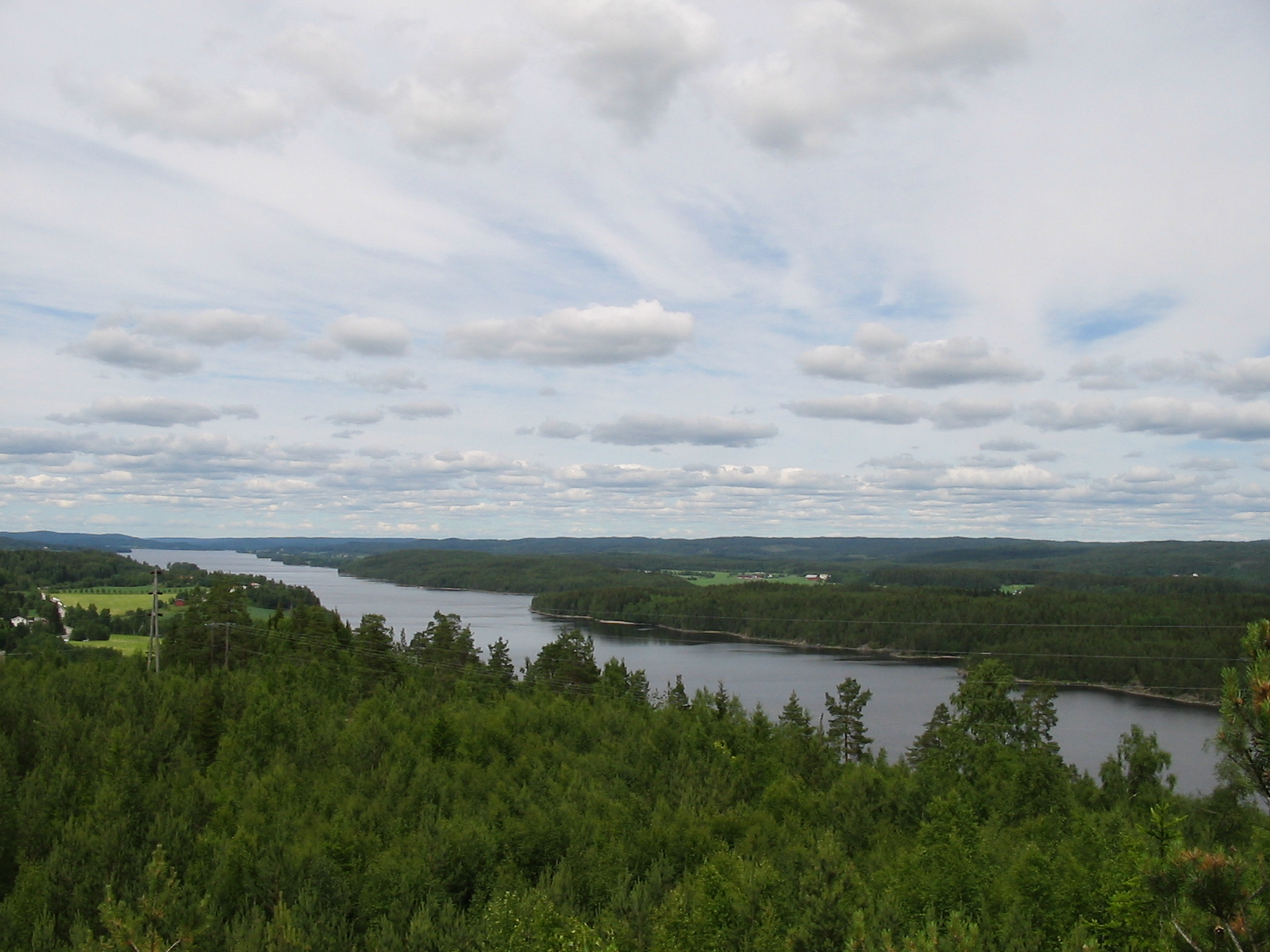
Rødenes lake

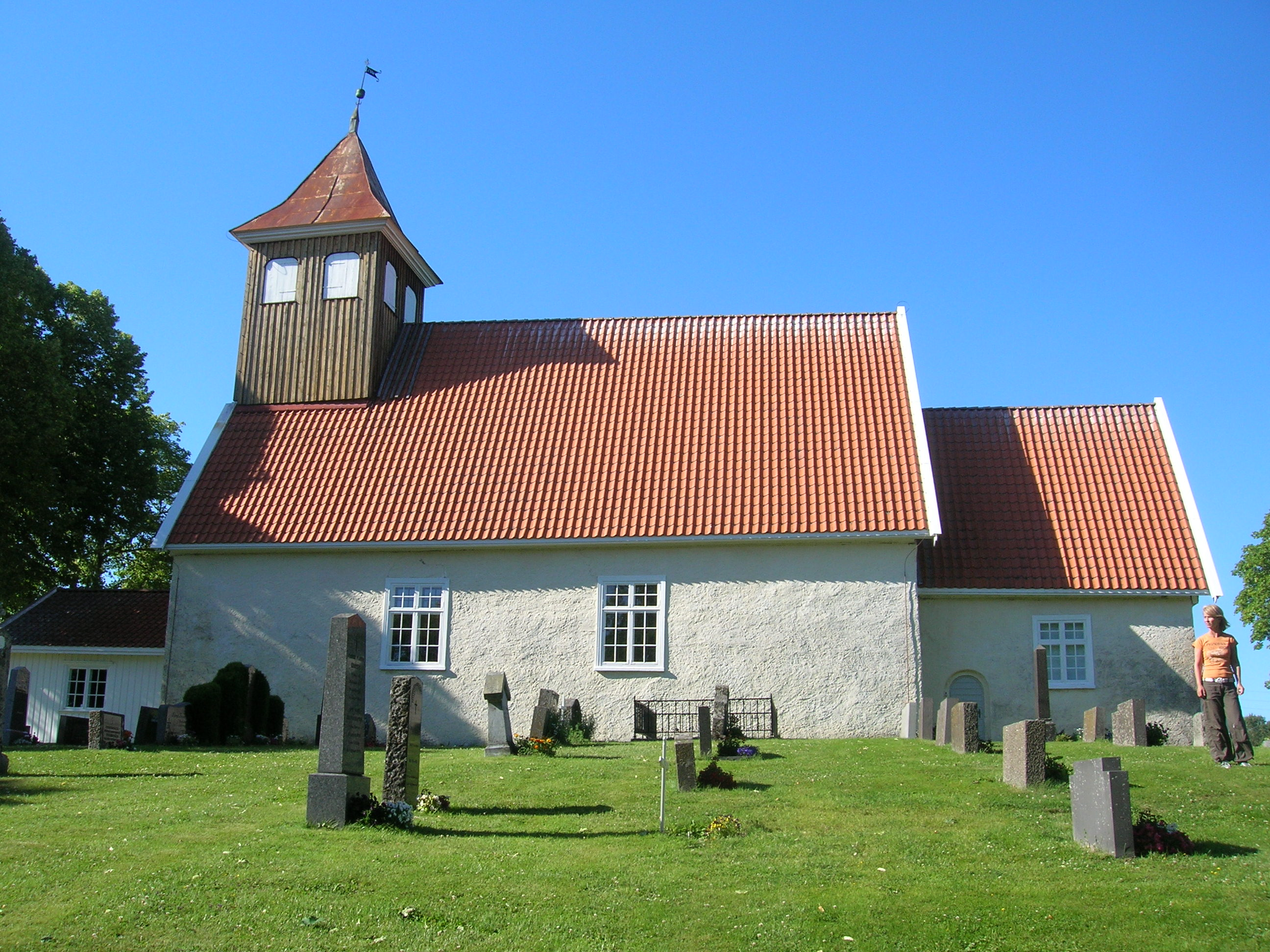
Rødenes church

Rødenes is a former municipality in the former Østfold county, Norway.

The parish of Rødenæs was established as a municipality on 1 January 1838 (see formannskapsdistrikt). The district of Rømskog was separated from Rødenes as a municipality of its own on 1 January 1902. The split left Rødenes with a population of 1,378. Rødenes was merged with Øymark to form the new municipality of Marker on 1 January 1964. Before the merger, Rødenes had a population of 1,314.

== The name ==
The municipality (originally the parish) was named after the old farm Rødenes, since the first church was built there. The first element is (maybe) derived from Norse rauðr 'red', the last element is nes n 'headland'.

== Rødenes Church ==
Rødenes Church (Rødenes kirke) is a medieval era church in the Rødenes parish. Rødenes church belongs to Østre Borgesyssel deanery of the Diocese of Borg. The church is of Romanesque architecture style and dates from 1230. The church has a rectangular nave and lower and narrower choir. The pulpit of oak is from the 1600s. The altarpiece dates from the 1720s. The edifice is of stone and brick. The church is of long plan and has 240 number of seats. The church underwent extensive reconstruction in the years 1703–1709. Between 1949 and 1952, the church was restored.
