= Battle of Rakkestad =

1814 battle in Norway

- Part of the Swedish–Norwegian War of 1814
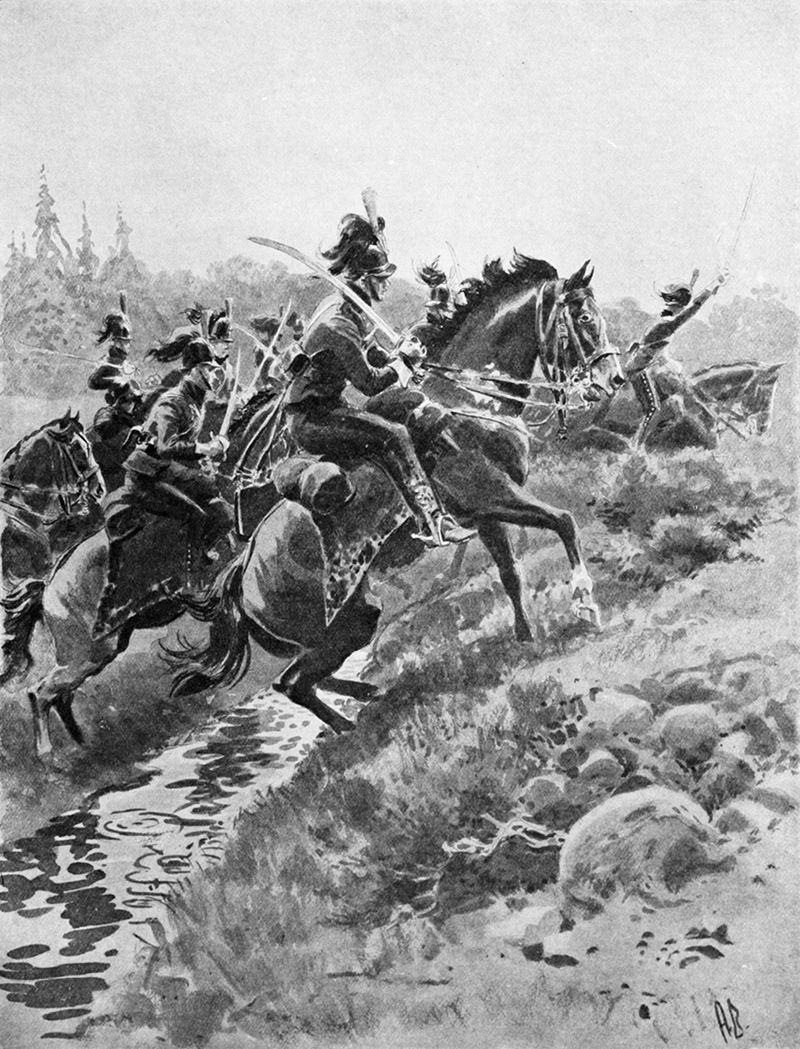
- Swedish cavalry at Rakkestad, by Andreas Bloch
Date	6 August 1814
Location	Rakkestad, Norway 59°22′23″N 11°25′13″E
Result	Swedish victory

Belligerents
Norway	Sweden

Commanders and leaders
(Norway) Frederik Stabell	Eberhard Vegesack

Strength
1,700–2,000; 4 guns	2,000–3,000; 4 guns

Casualties and losses
100–150 killed or wounded 40 captured	50 killed, wounded or captured

War of the Sixth Coalition:
Swedish–Norwegian War (1814)
The color black indicates the current battle.

The Battle of Rakkestad was fought in the Swedish–Norwegian War of 1814, at the village of Rakkestad, Norway, between 2,000–3,000 Swedes force under Eberhard von Vegesack, and a slightly smaller Norwegian force, led by Frederik Wilhelm Stabell. The Swedish forces drove the Norwegians back from their fortified positions with a disciplined bayonet-attack and dealt them considerable losses. This battle crippled the morale of the Norwegian defenders, and especially their leader, King Christian Frederik, which contributed to a rapid end of the war, eight days later, with the Convention of Moss.

== Background ==
As Swedish forces blockaded the Norwegian town of Halden with its fortress Fredriksten, the Swedish Crown Prince Charles John received word that the Norwegians were gathering an army of between 5,000 and 6,000 men under King Christian Frederik, and marched towards von Vegesack from Kjølen to break the Swedish blockade of the town. Prince Charles John then ordered von Vegesack to gather his forces and counterattack the Norwegian main army at Rakkestad. Christian Frederik, however, called off the Norwegian advance after receiving news of the Swedish capture of Fredrikstad; the Norwegian south flank was now seriously threatened, for which reason he withdrew closer to the Glomma river, to keep his escape route open and avoid encirclement. He established his headquarters at Spydeberg, while Norwegian forces of between 1,700 and 2,000 men — other sources say 3,000 and even 4,000 men — with 4 guns, under Frederik Wilhelm Stabell (including P. H. Butenschøn's force that would later arrive to the battlefield), destroyed the bridge at the village of Rakkestad and fortified themselves in an advantageous position behind the river.

== Battle ==
Vegesack and his troops struck camp at 6 August and marched towards the Norwegians with between 2,000 and 3,000 men with 4 guns. After some reconnaissance, the Swedish commander decided to force his way over the river, on the Norwegian right flank. A bridge was quickly established under the cover of 2 six-pounder guns — the Norwegians could only answer with 2 one-pounder guns of their own — and some Swedish Jägers, mainly from the Värmland Jäger Regiment, who exchanged fire with the Norwegian center across the river. Once the bridge was completed, one battalion each from the Värmland Jägers and Skaraborg infantry Regiment, led by Vegesack, quickly crossed and launched an all-out bayonet attack on the Norwegian right flank, who were forced back. This action relieved the pressure on the center, where the 2nd battalion of the Värmland Jägers and Kalmar Regiment could now cross on another temporary bridge and join the fight, which forced the Norwegians to abandon their positions and flee. Some Norwegian reinforcements under P. H. Butenschøn arrived and, with the cover of a forest, managed to temporarily halt the Swedish onslaught; they were soon, however, quickly thrown back by the Swedish Jägers, and so the battle was decided in favor of the Swedes, as more troops crossed the river and pursued the fleeing Norwegians.

== Aftermath ==
The victory had been total, with as few as 11 to 15 men killed and 36 to 45 wounded Swedes, to 100 or 150 killed and wounded and 40 captured Norwegians, among them a captain. The Värmland Jägers and Skargaborg infantry regiment distinguished themselves especially. Vegesack soon marched on towards Flåtestad, where he joined forces with Bror Cederström, before continuing towards Trømborg, where another Norwegian force was repulsed. Once they reached Askim, the Swedes encountered another Norwegian entrenchment a distance away, at Langnes, where another battle took place. Vegesack then advanced as far as Trøgstad and there captured about 200 Norwegians soldiers (the rest withdrew over the Glomma), on 11 August; the Swedes had thus became masters of the eastern side of the Glomma, south of Øyeren. At the same day as the Battle of Kjølberg Bridge, on 14 August, the Convention of Moss was signed, in favor of Sweden.
