= Meeting of Notables =

1814 meeting prior to Norwegian independence

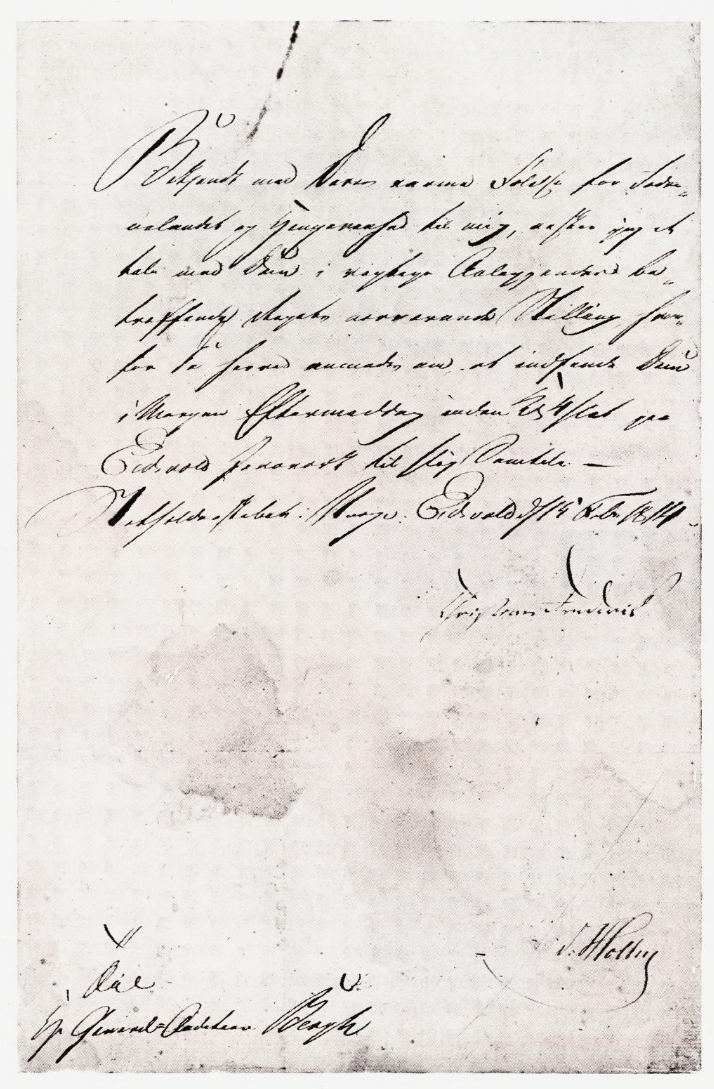
Letter calling for joingin Meeting of Notables in Eidsvoll, Norway february 1814

The Meeting of Notables (Norwegian: notabelmøtet or stormannsmøtet) was a meeting that took place before Norway declared independence from Denmark in 1814.

In the Treaty of Kiel, king Frederick VI of Denmark-Norway ceded the Kingdom of Norway to king Charles XIII of Sweden. Prince Christian Frederik, vice-roy of Norway and heir to the thrones of Denmark and Norway, took the lead in the ensuing widespread movement for national independence. He saw his opportunity to claim the Norwegian throne as legal heir, possibly with the ultimate goal of re-uniting the two countries. He summoned twenty-one leading figures of society ("notables") to hear them out.

The meeting took place in Eidsvoll on 16 February 1814. It soon became clear that the principle of popular sovereignty was rooted among the participants, and that sovereignty had been restored to the people by the abdication of the king. If Christian Frederik were to ascend the throne, he would have to be elected by the people in a manner seen as democratic. The meeting of notables advised the prince to arrange the election for a Norwegian Constituent Assembly to decide the form of government and eventually elect the head of state. On his return to Christiania on 19 February, he took the title of regent and gave instructions for the elections, which were to be held in all churches on Sunday 25 February or the following Sundays. The Constituent Assembly was to convene on 10 April the same year at Eidsvoll Manor.

The Constituent Assembly did elect Christian Frederik as King, but his short reign was stopped when Sweden invaded in the summer.

== List of participants ==
This is a list of the participants at the Meeting of Notables.

- Christian Frederik, Prince of Denmark and Norway
- Fredrik Julius Bech
- Marcus Gjøe Rosenkrantz
- Mathias Sommerhielm
- Jonas Collett
- Poul Christian Holst
- Hans Hagerup Falbe
- Christoffer Anker Bergh
- Niels Treschow
- Georg Sverdrup
- Otto Lütken
- Frederik Gottschalk von Haxthausen
- Christian D. A. Arenfeldt
- Johannes Klingenberg Sejersted
- F. W. Haffner
- Hans Henrik Rode
- F. L. Brock
- Peder Anker
- Carsten Anker
- Peter Anker
- Carsten Tank
- Jacob Nielsen

Of these, only Georg Sverdrup and Peder Anker were members of the Constituent Assembly.

== See also ==
- Norway in 1814
