= Siege of Fredrikstad =

Siege during the 1814 Swedish–Norwegian War

- Part of the Swedish–Norwegian War of 1814
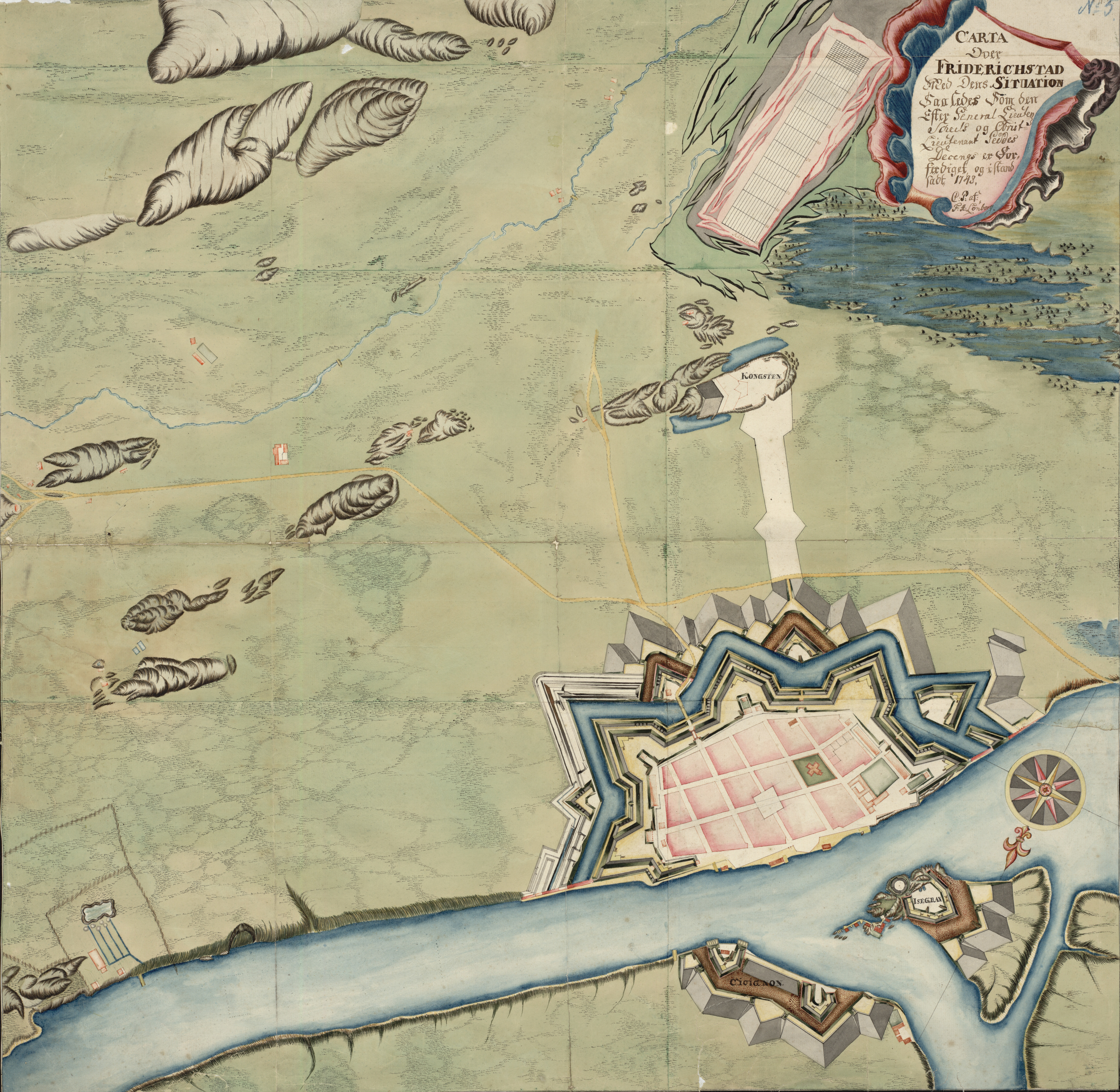
- Map over Fredrikstad
| Date | 4 August 1814 |
| Location | Fredrikstad, Norway 59°12′19″N 10°57′0″E |
| Result | Swedish victory |

Belligerents
| Norway | Sweden |

Commanders and leaders
| (Norway) Christian VIII (Norway) Nils Hals | Charles XIII; Charles XIV John |

Strength
| 1,100 | 6,000; 50 gunboats |

Casualties and losses
| 207 surrendered | 7 killed 12 wounded |

War of the Sixth Coalition:
Swedish–Norwegian War (1814)
The color black indicates the current battle.

Fredrikstad Fortress, under the command of Nils Christian Frederik Hals, was captured by the Swedish armed forces on 4 August 1814. 207 men remained in the fortress as the Norwegian surrendered to the Swedes; the rest had evacuated earlier. The Swedish casualties were few, 7 men killed and 12 wounded from the army, navy and Archipelago fleet combined.
