= Johannes Klingenberg Sejersted =

General of Norway

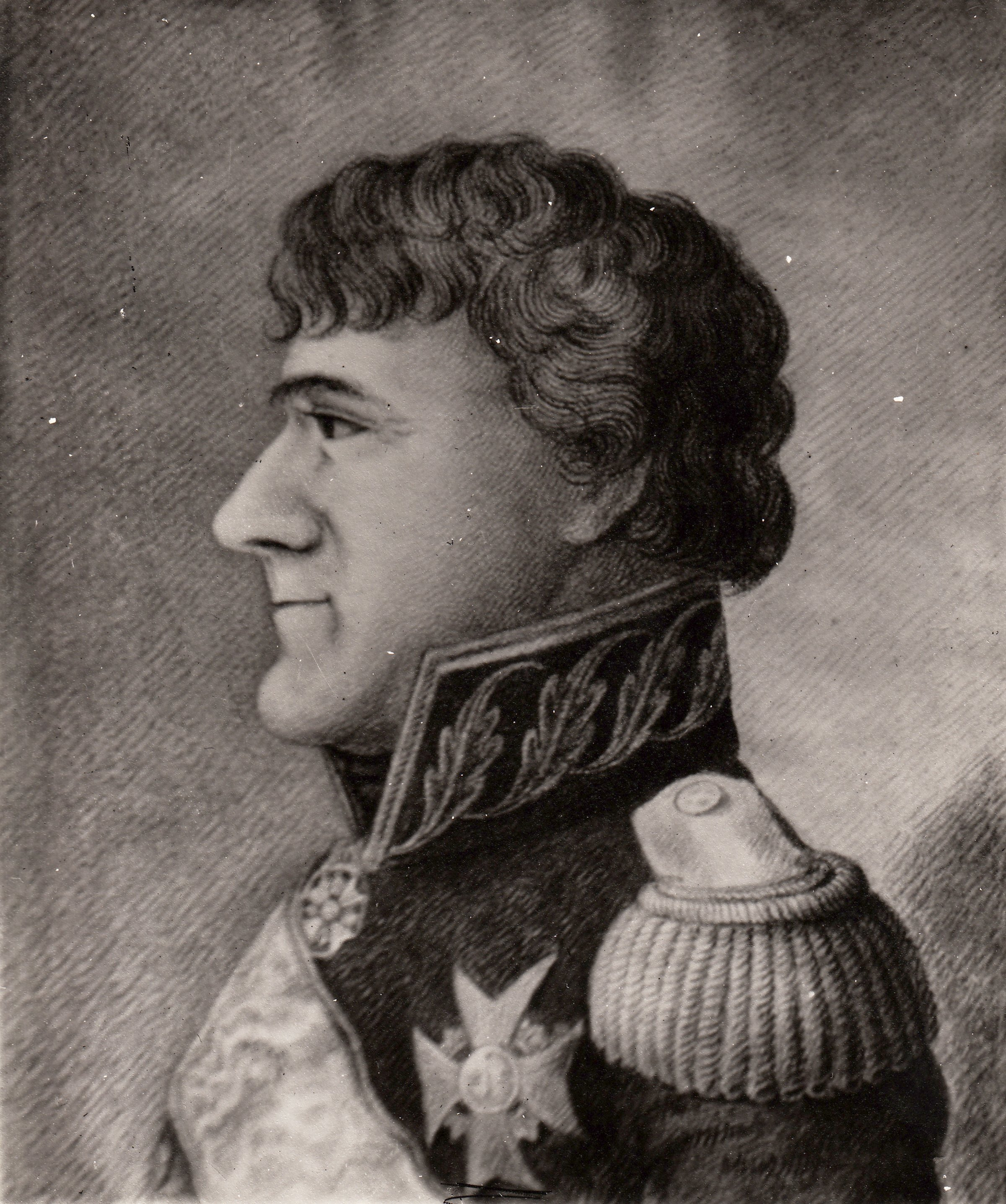
- Johannes Klingenberg Sejersted.
- Born: 7 April 1761; Flå, Søndre Trondhjem, Denmark-Norway
- Died: 17 September 1823 (aged 62); Trondhjem, Denmark-Norway
- Alma mater: University of Copenhagen
- Relatives: Lieutenant Colonel Jens Fredrik Svane Sejersted and Dorothea Catharina Klingenberg
- Military career
- Allegiance: Norwegian
- Rank: Lieutenant General
- Conflicts: Theatre War; Dano-Swedish War (1808–1809); Swedish–Norwegian War

Johannes Klingenberg Sejersted (7 April 1761 – 17 September 1823) was a Norwegian military officer.

== Career ==
He was born in Flå in Søndre Trondhjem county, as a son of Lieutenant Colonel Jens Fredrik Svane Sejersted and his wife Dorothea Catharina Klingenberg. He studied at the University of Copenhagen from 1777 to 1781. In 1788 he served as an aide-de-camp of General Moltke during the Theater War, when Denmark-Norway attacked Sweden. Sejersted remained in the military, and was promoted to second lieutenant in 1781 and premier lieutenant in 1789. In 1794, he joined the Dano-Norwegian General Staff, from 1795 as captain. He was promoted to major in October 1807, and at the same time stationed in Norway. In early 1808 he assisted the Danish Prince Christian August of Augustenborg in his campaigns in Aurskog-Høland, as a part of the Dano-Swedish War. He would remain on Christian August's staff until the war's end in 1809. He was promoted to lieutenant colonel in August 1808 and colonel later that year.

In February 1814 he was summoned by another Danish Prince, Christian Frederick, to participate in the Meeting of Notables, which set the principles for a later Norwegian Constituent Assembly. As Norway declared independence in May the same year, Sejersted was appointed head of the newly created General Staff on 25 May 1814. He was also promoted to major general.

=== Defence plan ===
Already in 1813, on Christian Frederick's request, Sejersted had crafted a military plan for a soon-to-become-independent Norway. The plan was defensive. In principle it was a copy of Christian August's actions in 1808; specifically Sejersted did not wish to invade Sweden, only route Swedish forces from Norway if necessary.

In January 1814 the Treaty of Kiel was signed, giving Sweden (as a victorious country in the Napoleonic Wars) control over Norway. In the same month Sejersted received a direct order to create a more offensive strategic plan. He did so, however the plan was never actually followed. Since Norwegian independence ran afoul of the Treaty of Kiel, Sweden took action and invaded Norway in the summer. In reality, then, Norway came to follow a defensive strategy. However, there were some important discrepancies between Sejersted's politically influenced plan and the battleground. Thus, Norwegian forces experienced a retreat from Rakkestad near the Swedish border early in the conflict. Sejersted then crafted a new plan, but this was abandoned as Christian Frederick, in May crowned as King and thus commander-in-chief, abandoned a Norwegian stronghold at Langnes. A third defensive plan followed, but again the King acted against it to achieve a short-term goal. In sum Sejersted appealed fruitlessly to Christian Frederick to enact a truly forceful defence of Norway, and in the latter phase of the conflict he stood without real influence. Sweden overran Norway, leading to the Convention of Moss, a new Constitution in November and the ascent of Charles II to the throne in a personal union between Sweden and Norway.

== Later life ==
Sejersted kept his military standing despite the union with Sweden. From 1815 Sejersted was stationed in Trøndelag, first with the rank of General, then as Lieutenant General from 1818. He died in September 1823 in Trondhjem, unmarried.
