= Battle of Kjølberg Bridge =

1814 battle between Sweden and Norway

- Part of the Swedish–Norwegian War of 1814
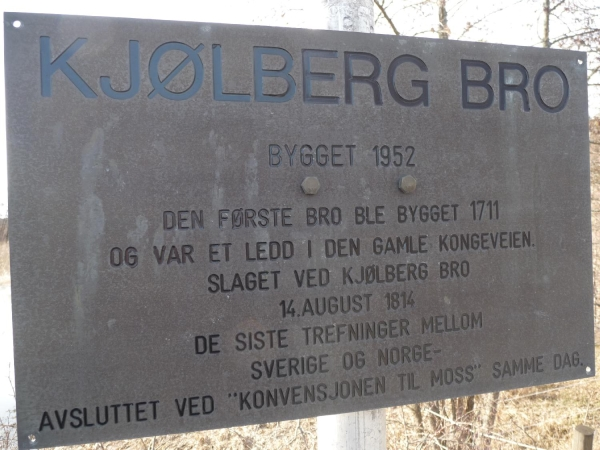
- Plaque of the Battle of Kjølberg bridge August 14, 1814
Date	14 August 1814
Location	Kjølberg bridge, north of Fredrikstad, Norway 59°12′19″N 10°57′0″E
Result	Swedish victory

Belligerents
Norway	Sweden

Commanders and leaders
Unknown	Gustav Mörner

Strength
600	75 engaged (supported by 4 battalions)

Casualties and losses
30 killed 30 captured	3 killed 14 wounded

War of the Sixth Coalition:
Swedish–Norwegian War (1814)
The color black indicates the current battle.

The Battle of Kjølberg Bridge (Swedish: Slaget vid Kjølbergs bro) was fought 14 August 1814, during the Swedish–Norwegian war of 1814. The Swedish army had problems repairing the bridge due to constant fire from the Norwegian side of the river. It was then a small Swedish force of 75 men, consisting of jägers from the Bohuslän and Life Grenadier Regiments, passed over the river at a hidden point. Once over they waited for reinforcements but none came; but instead the order of attacking the vastly larger Norwegian force. The Colonel response to the attack order has been famous "It is unreasonable to attack with only 75 men when you face a whole regiment." "But such an order isn't given to me twice. March!" During cheers the Swedes rushed up the hill toward the mansion that was occupied with 600 men. The attack was surprising and decisive. As more Swedish troops crossed, the Norwegians quickly left the stand. This was the last battle fought during the Swedish–Norwegian War. The Convention of Moss, providing a cease fire agreement, was signed that same day.

The last shots were fired north of the bridge with the Norwegians in retreat.

== See also ==
- Norway in 1814
- Union between Sweden and Norway
