= Invasion of Hvaler =

Capture of the Hvaler islands by Swedish forces in 1814

- Part of the Swedish–Norwegian War of 1814
| Date | 29 July 1814 |
| Location | Hvaler, Norway 59°3′23″N 11°1′20″E |
| Result | Swedish victory |
| Territorial changes | Swedish forces occupy Hvaler |

Belligerents
| Norway | Sweden |

Commanders and leaders
| Unknown | Unknown |

War of the Sixth Coalition:
Swedish–Norwegian War (1814)
The color black indicates the current battle.

The invasion of Hvaler (Swedish: Invasionen av Hvaleröarna) was a Swedish military invasion during the Swedish-Norwegian War of 1814.

The invasion was directed at the Norwegian archipelago of Hvaler in the southwestern part of Østfold, Norway. The invasion went off rather peacefully. The hostilities opened on 26 July with a swift Swedish naval attack against the Norwegian gunboats at Hvaler. Bad weather had delayed the Swedish archipelago fleet and troop transports, which gave the Norwegian fleet and army time to evacuate the island. The Norwegian vessels managed to escape northward to Tønsberg on the western side of the Oslofjord despite all Swedish attempts to halt the retreat. The vessels in the Swedish archipelago fleet were heavier than their Norwegian counterparts and could not catch up with the retiring Norwegian naval fleet.
