= Hans Henrik Rode =

Norwegian military officer (1767–1830)

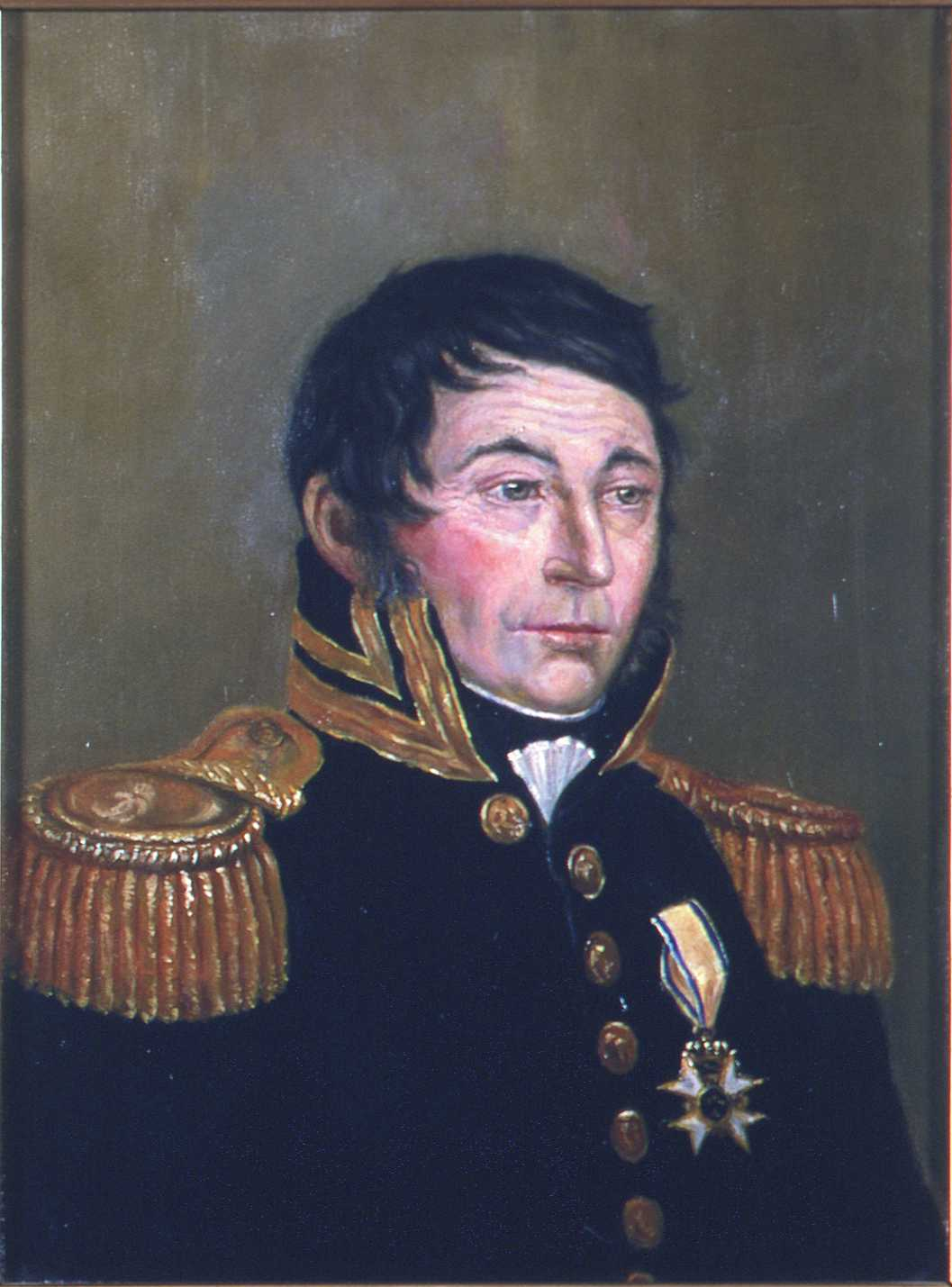
Hans Henrik Rode

Hans Henrik Rode (9 September 1767 – 29 December 1830) was a Norwegian military officer.

== Biography ==
He was born in Frederikshald as a son of major Georg Frederik Rode and his first wife Vilhelmine, née Stockfleth. He took a military education in Denmark, and became second lieutenant in 1784. He was promoted to premier lieutenant in 1790 and captain in 1800, and in the same year he became aide-de-camp for the governor in Rendsborg, Prince Frederick of Hesse. Rode was also a teacher at the military institute in Rendsborg from 1800 to 1808. He was promoted further to lieutenant in 1803, major in 1809 and lieutenant colonel in 1809. In 1809 Frederick of Hesse was appointed as commanding general in the southern part of Norway, and Rode followed him there.

Frederick of Hesse left Norway in 1813, whereas Rode stayed. He became a prominent figure in society, and participated in the Meeting of Notables in February 1814. When the former Crown Prince Christian Frederick of Denmark was elected King of Norway by the Norwegian Constituent Assembly in May 1814, Rode was appointed chamberlain with the rank of colonel in the same month. During the Swedish campaign against Norway of the summer, which would eventually oust Christian Frederick, Rode commanded a brigade—which did not see military action. Despite the change that occurred when Norway and Sweden formed a union, Rode remained a prominent figure. Having become general commissary of war in October 1814, he remained so until his death at the farm Søndre Hellerud in December 1830.

=== Family ===
In 1798 he married Charite Nicoline Holst (1778–1863) in Copenhagen. They had sons Frederik Rode (1800–1883) and Hans Henrik Albert Rode (1818–1883); daughter Henriette Nicoline Rode (1810–1898) married priest Gustav Adolph Lammers.
