= Riksakten =

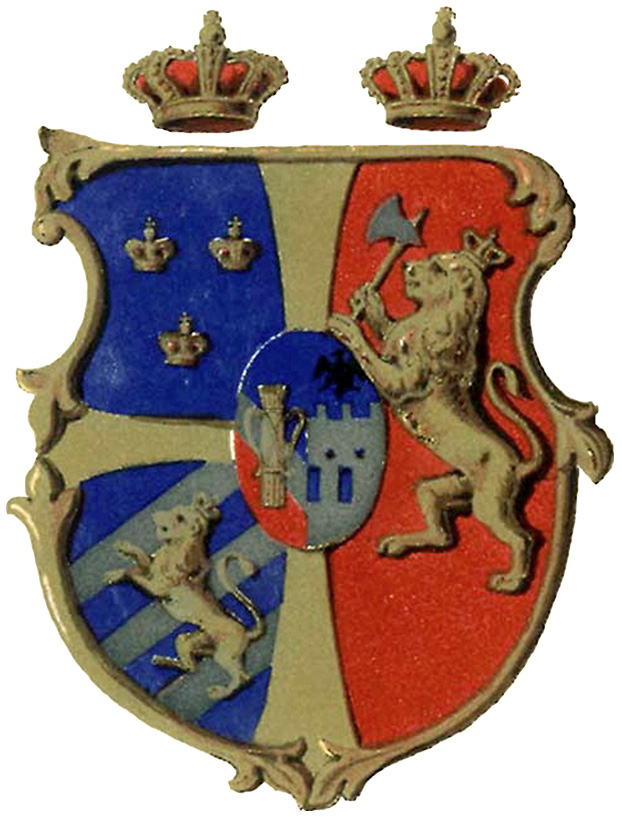
Union arms of Sweden and Norway, introduced 1844

The Riksakten was the 1815 Act of Union that regulated the terms of the constitutional personal union between Sweden and Norway established in 1814.

== History ==
The fundamental documents of the union were only the Convention of Moss and the revised Norwegian constitution of 4 November 1814. The Norwegian constitution had been adapted to the union before it was entered into, but the Swedish one was never adjusted correspondingly. The conservative Swedish Riksdag had not allowed the Swedish constitution of 1809 to be revised. Therefore, a bilateral treaty had to be negotiated in order to clarify procedures for treating constitutional questions that had to be decided jointly by both governments.

The Act of Union (Riksakten) was negotiated during the spring of 1815, with prime minister Peder Anker leading the Norwegian delegation. The treaty contained twelve articles dealing with the king's authority, the relationship between the two legislatures, how the executive power was to be exercised if the king should die before the crown prince had attained majority, and the relationship between the cabinets. It also confirmed the practice of treating questions of foreign policy in the Swedish cabinet, with the Norwegian prime minister present. Vital questions pertaining to the Union were to be treated in a joint cabinet meeting, where all the Norwegian ministers in Stockholm would be present. The Act was passed by the Storting 31 July 1815 and by the Riksdag 6 August, and sanctioned by the king on 15 August. In Sweden the Act of Union was a set of provisions under regular law, but the Norwegian Storting gave it constitutional status, so that its provisions could only be revised according to the procedures laid down in the constitution.

The Riksakten contained 12 paragraphs:

== See also ==
- Scandinavism
- Union Dissolution Day
- Norway in 1814
- Dissolution of the union between Norway and Sweden
