= Nils Christian Frederik Hals =

Norwegian military officer

- Born: April 23, 1758; Eidsberg, Denmark-Norway
- Died: June 27, 1838; Trøgstad, Norway
- Military career
- Allegiance: Norway
- Branch: (Norway) Norwegian Army
- Rank: Lieutenant Colonel
- Conflicts: Swedish–Norwegian War; Siege of Fredrikstad

Nils Christian Frederik Hals (April 23, 1758 – June 27, 1838) was a Norwegian military officer with the rank of lieutenant colonel.

Hals was born in Eidsberg. In March 1814 he was named commander of Fredrikstad Fortress after the commander at the time had declared the fortress to be in such poor condition that it could not be defended in the event of an attack. Hals was of the same opinion and was not eager to take on the position. He received a verbal assurance from the regent of Norway, Christian Fredrik, that the fortress would not be defended if it were attacked.

In 1814, the fortress was attacked and encircled by Swedish forces. Among other things, they had landed at Tangen at the southern tip of Kråkerøy and advanced to a position later named Svenskeberget (literally, 'Swedish hill') southwest of the fortress. From there, the Swedish forces had good positions and the advantage of the height of the terrain, which allowed them to fire their cannons directly into the fortified town. After a brief bombardment, Hals surrendered the fortress on August 4, 1814.

Hals was severely criticized for having surrendered the fortress without permission. He was sentenced to death by the Supreme Court of Norway on December 17, 1816; however, in 1817 he was granted a royal pardon from Crown Prince Charles John of Sweden and Norway and dismissed from military service. Hals then lived at the Solberg farm in Trøgstad, where he died.
