= Frederik Gottschalk von Haxthausen =

Danish-Norwegian army officer, councillor of state and cabinet member (1750–1825)

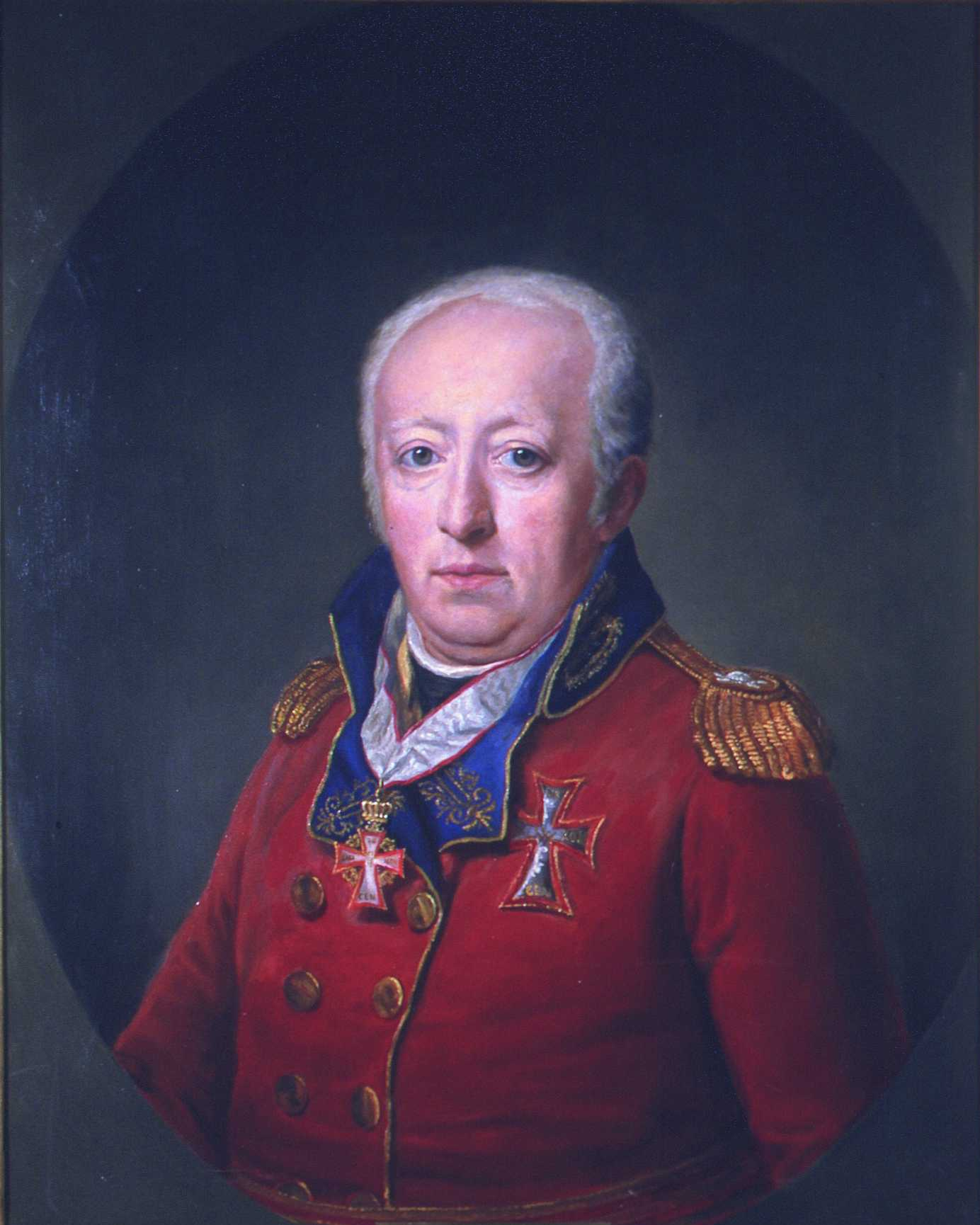

First Minister of Norway
- In office 2 March 1814 – 20 August 1814
- Monarch: Christian Frederick
- Preceded by: Position established
- Succeeded by: Marcus Gjøe Rosenkrantz

Minister of Finance of Norway
- In office 2 March 1814 – 20 August 1814
- Preceded by: Position established
- Succeeded by: Carsten Tank

Personal details
- Born: 14 July 1750 Copenhagen, Denmark
- Died: 6 July 1825 (aged 74) Christiania, Norway, Union between Sweden and Norway
- Spouse: Catharina von Oldenburg

Military service
- Branch/service: Norwegian Army
- Commands: Akershus fortress
- Battles/wars: Swedish–Norwegian War

Frederik Gottschalk von Haxthausen (14 July 1750 – 6 July 1825) was a Dano-Norwegian army officer, councillor of state, cabinet member, and Norway's first minister of finance.

== Biography ==
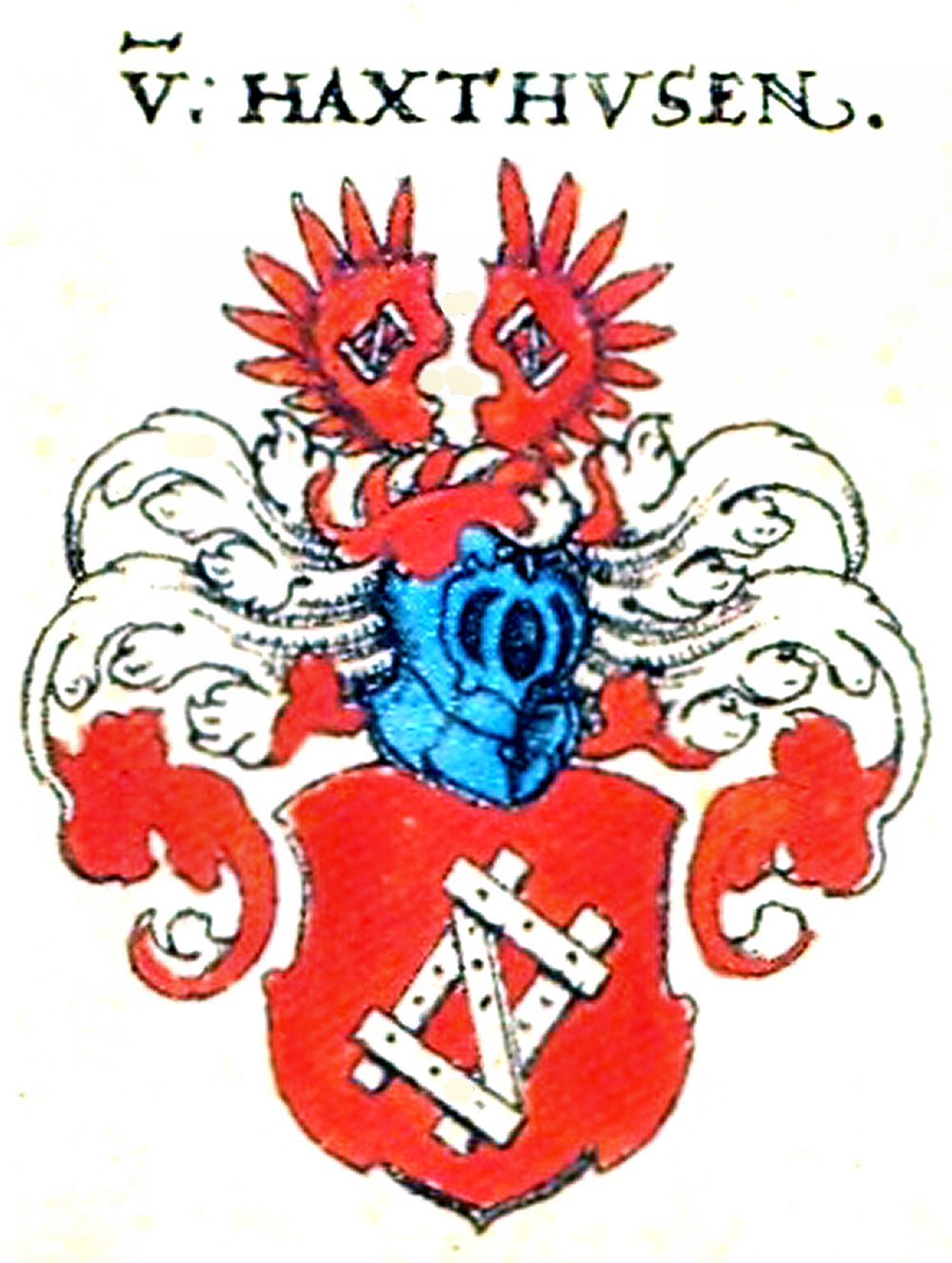
Haxthausen coat of arms (1602)

Haxthausen was born in Copenhagen, Denmark. His father was Major-General Frederik Gottschalck Haxthausen (1705–1770) and Juliane Dorothea von Haxthausen (1719–1790). He enrolled at the Army Cadet Academy ast the age of six. He became fændrik in Prince Frederik's Regiment at the age of 11, became a junior lieutenant in 1763 and a senior lieutenant in 1881. He was sent to Norway in 1773 as a first lieutenant of Søndenfjeldske regiment, and rose to the rank of captain and company commander in 1779 and major in 1788. Subsequently, Haxthausen participated in the Theatre War between 1788 and 1789. In 1789, he was appointed generalkrigskommissær, the officer in charge of national conscription, and in 1802, he became the director of the War Academy (Krigsskolen). As a result of the disastrous provision of troops during the war, he travelled abroad in 1793 to study military supply provision. As such, he visited the Prussian, Austrian, and other armies.

In 1806, he became the commanding officer of Akershus fortress, a charge he held until 1814. He spent the years 1808–1810 in Denmark as head of the war commissariate, but retained all of his Norwegian posts. Haxthausen had a major influence on Prince Christian Frederick as viceroy (stattholder) of Norway from 1813, joined the interim government of Christian Frederick in March 1814, and on 19 May 1814, he became Minister of Finance in the first cabinet of an independent Norway.

During the Swedish campaign against Norway in 1814, he served as a lieutenant general, but was wrongly accused of being a traitor, and on 19 August, 5 days after the Convention of Moss, his house and garden were attacked by a mob. Haxthausen had to flee the town and withdrew from all his positions. In 1816, an impeachment process cleared him.

After 1814, the Akershus fortress went out of operational military use, thus making Haxthausen the last operational commander of the fortress. He died in Christiania, 6 July 1825.

In 1879, a street in Christiania (Now Oslo) in the Frogner area close to his home was named after Haxthausen.

== Sources ==
- Aschehougs konversasjonsleksikon, Vol. 9, Oslo (1957), H.Aschehoug & co.
- Oslo byleksikon
