= Battle of Langnes =

Battle of the 1814 Swedish–Norwegian War

- Part of the Swedish–Norwegian War of 1814
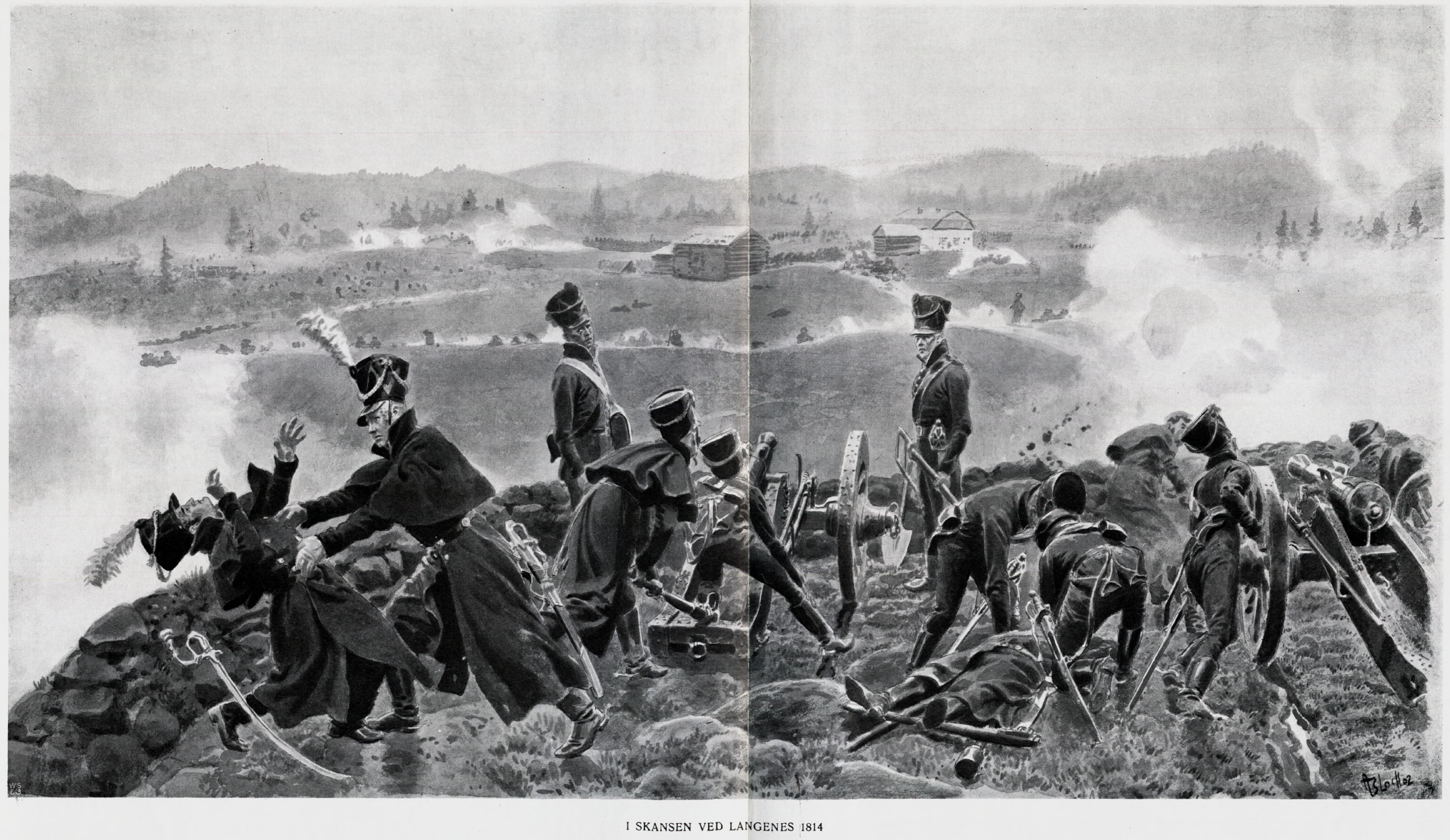
- The entrenchments at Langnes, by Andreas Bloch
Date	9 August 1814
Location	Langnes, Norway 59.609°N 11.129°E
Result	See Aftermath

Belligerents
Norway	Sweden

Commanders and leaders
(Norway) Christian VIII (Norway) Diderich Hegermann	Eberhard Vegesack; Bror Cederström

Strength
2,000; 8 guns	3,000

Casualties and losses
6 killed 10 wounded 2 guns lost	60–100 killed or wounded

War of the Sixth Coalition:
Swedish–Norwegian War (1814)
The color black indicates the current battle.

The Battle of Langnes, or the Battle of Langnes Entrenchment, was fought between Norway and Sweden as a part of the Swedish-Norwegian War of 1814. The battle, even as it ended inconclusively, served as a tactical victory to the Norwegians since they now could avoid an unconditional surrender to the Swedish.

== Background ==
The Norwegian Army had earlier suffered several defeats against the Swedish forces in Eastern Norway, and when Fredrikstad Fortress surrendered on the 4th of August it was clear that it was only a matter of time before Sweden would win the war. At this time the Norwegian forces in Smaalenenes Amt were trying to reorganize themselves east of Askim by the Glomma river, and had built a pontoon bridge at Langnes to help speed up the withdrawal. The bridge was built so that the bridgehead would be easy to defend in case of a Swedish attack.

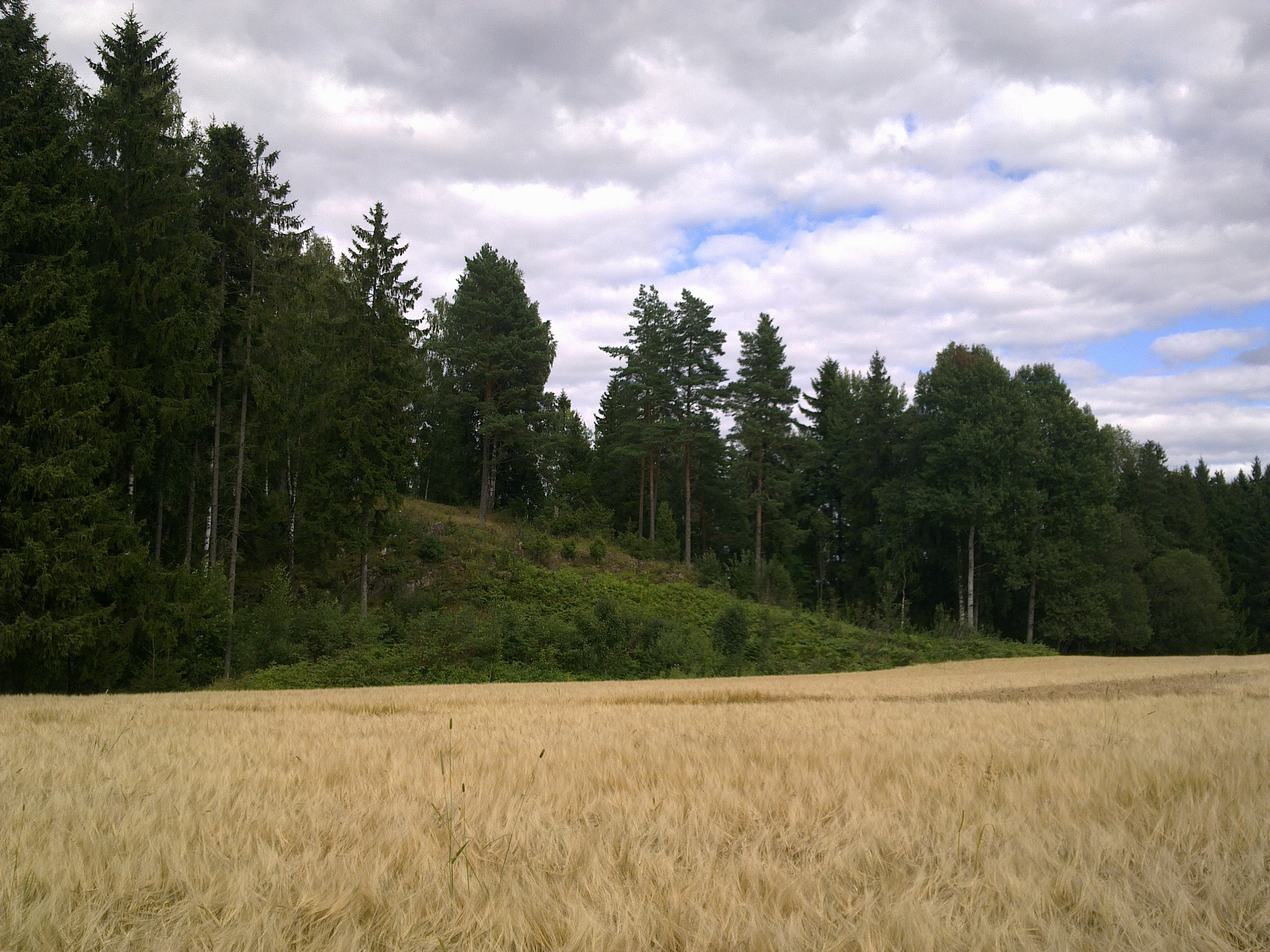
The hill used for the Norwegian artillery battery

=== Preparations for the Swedish attack ===
Colonel Diderich Hegermann placed his forces in position to defend the bridgehead while simultaneously allowing retreating Norwegian troops to cross the bridge. In addition to the two regiments from Kristians Amt and three divisions of sharpshooters from Valdres, he had eight guns available, four of which were emplaced on the small hill to fire at the Swedish attackers.

=== The Swedish advance ===
The Swedish forces consisted of several infantry regiments from Västergötland and Värmland under the leadership of General Eberhard von Vegesack and Lieutenant Colonel Bror Cederström. The force had marched towards the Norwegian bridgehead since the 8th of August, and several armed patrols were sent out to reconnoiter. During the night to the 9th of August the first Swedish troops arrived at Langnes.

Colonel Hegermann had sent out Norwegian patrols to keep track of how far the Swedish advance had arrived, and there were several skirmishes between Norwegian and Swedish forces during the night between the 8th and 9 August. It was unusually bad weather that night, and a Norwegian Captain who came into contact with a Swedish scout survived because the flashpan powder in the Swede's flintlock musket was wet. The scout charged with his bayonet, and in a dramatic fight the Captain broke his sword, but managed to kill the Swedish soldier and capture his musket. The captured gun is still exhibited in the Norwegian Museum of Defence.

== The battle ==
=== Norwegian surprise attack ===
Colonel Hegermann tried to exploit the confusion caused by the bad weather, and before dawn he launched a surprise attack against the Swedish troops. In the rain and darkness, the attack quickly turned to a bayonet and gun butt fight, with the Norwegians beating the tired Swedes back. Not knowing the rate of the Swedish advance and fearing to be cut off from his own lines, Hegermann ordered a retreat back to the entrenchment in the morning hours, with the Swedes hot on their heels.

=== The Swedish attack ===
At the break of dawn, two Swedish battalions from the Västgöta-Dals and Värmland Regiments, who had chased the Norwegians to the entrenchment, immediately attacked. The Swedish troops were sent forth in columns from a small rise where Langnes Station on the Østfold Line is today, about half a kilometre from the Norwegian lines. The open fields between the small rise and the cannon battery gave the Norwegian field artillery a good field of fire. The fields, being sodden by the nights rain, slowed the Swedish advance in front of the Norwegian guns. Colonel Hegermann ordered his men to hold the fire until the Swedes had advanced right up to the entrenchment, allowing the cannons to fire into the flank of the advancing column with canister shots. Hegermann later described how shots from the Norwegian cannons «[...]made it look like a wagon had rolled through them from head to queue». (Note: The Colonel is cited: The tight column looked as «[...]om en vogn hadde faret gjennom den fra teten til køen».)

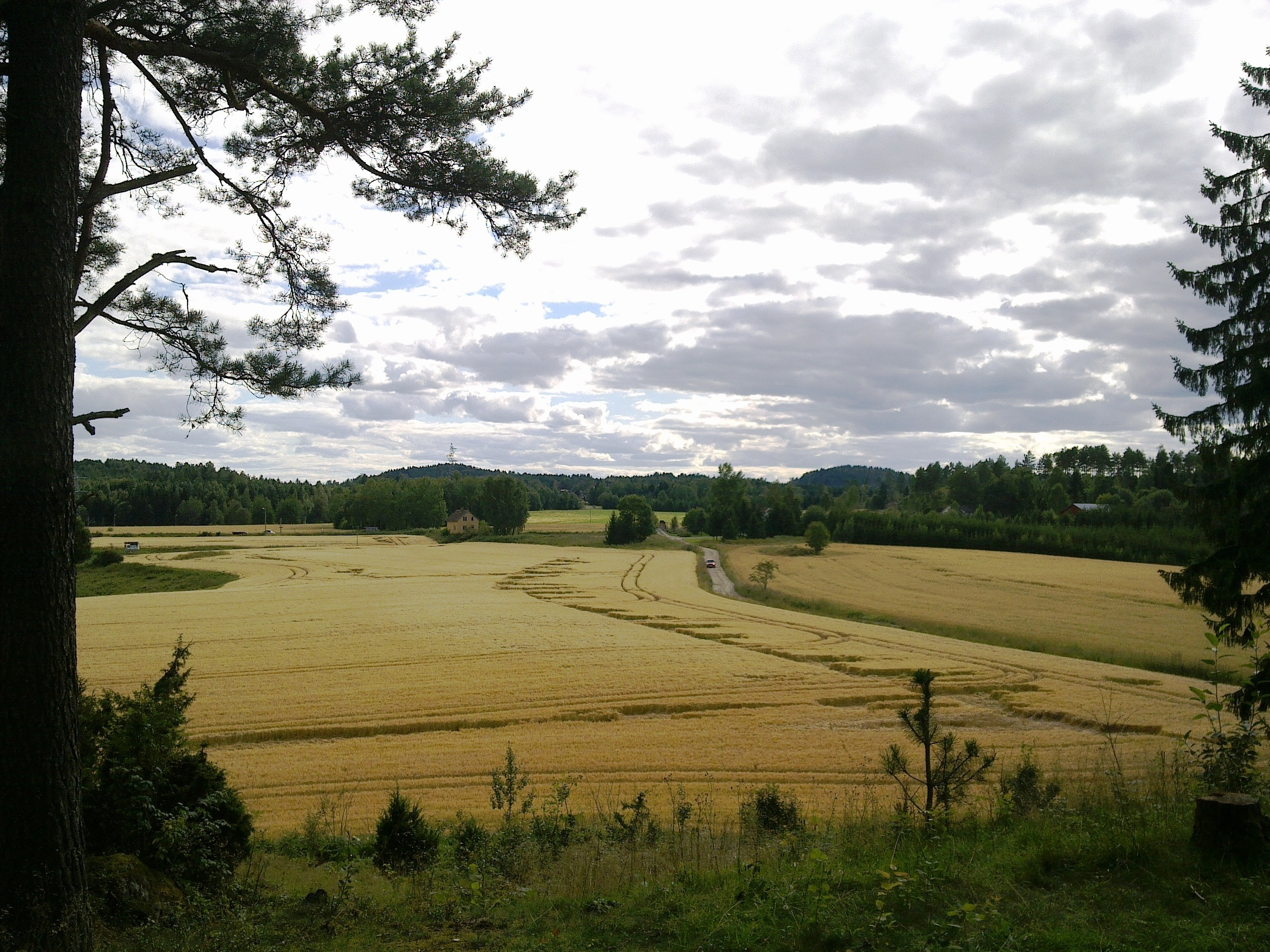
The field from which Swedish troops launched assaults against the Norwegian position. Langnes station is behind the field to the left

The first assault turned out to be costly for the Swedes, who lost the majority of their fallen in the battle during the first attack. As the attack broke down, some Swedish forces took refuge on the Langnes farm itself. They were driven off by more cannon fire, which destroyed the buildings.

The Swedes reorganized and advanced a second time through rain and mud. They were again met by concentrated fire, and the attack petered out without the Swedish forces having breached the Norwegian line.

Late in the morning the Swedes attacked a third time. This time they organized their troops in skirmisher formation, keeping up a continuous fire on the Norwegian line to suppress return fire and also presenting a dispersed target, making it difficult to use the cannons effectively. The Swedes had better gunpowder, giving their muskets better range. The attack of the skirmishing line had a devastating effect on the cannon battery, that had been placed on a hillock, without a proper breastwork. Swedish riflemen reinforced the skirmishing chain, killing several Norwegian artillerists, among them lieutenant Hauch. Colonel Hegermann got the battery reorganised and drove the sharpshooters off with several well aimed cannon shots. Though effective use of the cannons had forced the Swedes to withdraw for the third time, the Norwegian command had realized that the battery had been badly placed, and would not be able to hold off the Swedes in the long run.

== Norwegian withdrawal ==
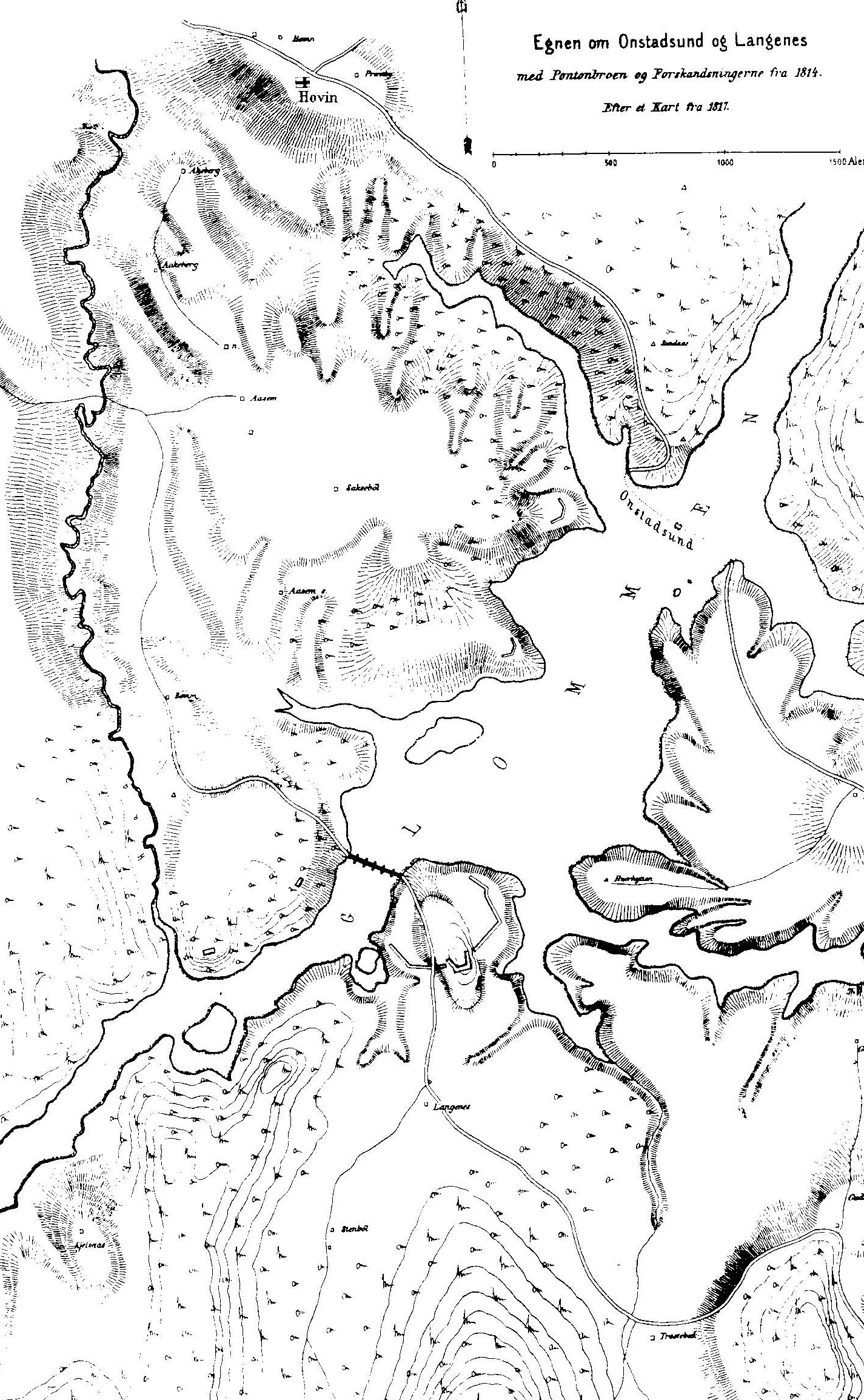
Map of Langnes and the adjacent area. The Norwegian line and the pontoon bridge are marked

The young king Christian Frederik had spent the night at the nearby Spydeberg farm was woken by the cannon fire. Rushing up to the pontoon bridge, he was met by soldiers carrying the body of Lieutenant Hauch across. According to period sources, the young king exclaimed: «Too much blood for my sake!», to which the soldiers answered: «Not too much my Liege, too little!» (Note: Cited: The Kings statement is «For meget blod for min skyld», the soldiers reply is given as «Ikke for meget blod, konge, for litet!») However, in light of the overall strategic situation, the king ordered a withdrawal. Colonel Hegermann was planning a counterattack and a dispute with the king ensued. The king is quoted as having said «But by God, have you not sacrificed enough of these fair folks blood?» (Note: Quoted: The Kings statement is given as «Men min Gud, har De da endu ikke oppoffret nok af disse smukke Folk?»)

The Norwegian losses behind their entrenchment had been insignificant, with only 6 men dead (among them the young Lieutenant Hauch) and 9 or 10 wounded. The two Swedish battalions, which soon withdrew back to the rest of the army, had sustained at least 15 men dead and 47 wounded; the Swedes considered the action to be successful as the initial Norwegian attack was repulsed, followed by a reconnaissance of the fields in front of their entrenchment.

At noon the 9th of August 1814 the final shots of the last major engagement between Norwegian and Swedes petered out. With the Swedes no longer a threat, the Norwegian withdrawal across the makeshift bridge was undisturbed and went swiftly. Being short on horses, the Norwegian command decided to ditch three cannons into the river Glomma which runs deep at this point, to vehement protest from the soldiers. The bridge was then dismantled by cutting the moorings for the boats.

== Aftermath ==
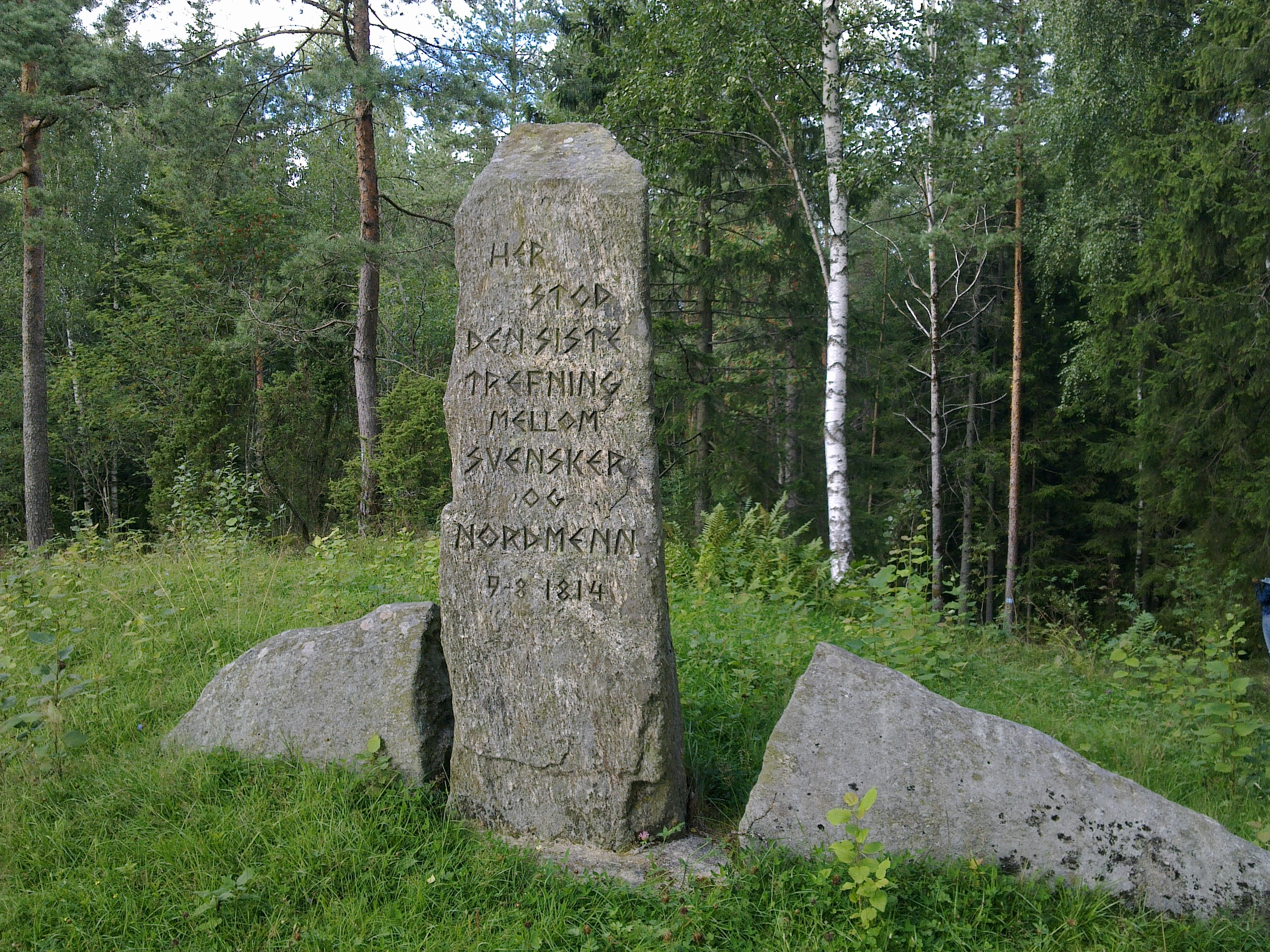
Memorial marker at the top of the Norwegian fortifications

After the Norwegian forces had withdrawn to the Western bank of Glomma, Colonel Hegermann marched his troops southwards to reinforce the defensive positions along Glomma, which had been threatened after the Swedes had taken the islands of Tune and Rolvsøy. The experienced Swedish soldier, Crown Prince Charles John had ordered his troops to secure the whole of the Eastern bank of the river, and several skirmishes took place along the river until the final ceasefire order was signed on the 14th of August.

Despite having held the Swedes back at Langnes, it was becoming obvious that it was just a matter of time before the war itself would be lost. The Norwegian Army was short on supplies, having food only for two more weeks. Well before the battle, Crown Prince Charles John had offered negotiations, and even though the Norwegians may have won the battle, they lost the war five days later as king Christian Fredrik accepted a ceasefire. The following negotiations led to the Convention of Moss, which began the process of establishing the century long union between Sweden and Norway.

The Norwegian resistance had however not been in vain. The army had safely withdrawn across Glomma intact. Even though the War in Eastern Norway had gone badly for the Norwegians, the spirited defence of the bridgehead at Langnes had boosted morale. With the Norwegians having a largely intact and battle ready army on the eastern side of the river, it was obvious to the Swedes that a military victory could be costly. The victory at Langnes had thus given the Norwegian the diplomatic room needed to avoid the Swedes outright dictating the terms of surrender. As a secret part of the treaty the young king was obliged to convoke an extraordinary session of the Storting and then abdicate and return to Denmark, where he was heir to the throne, which he ascended in 1848 as Christian VII. The Storting would then amend the Constitution to allow for entry into a personal union with Sweden. The Storting unanimously approved the revised Constitution on 4 November 1814 and elected king Charles XIII of Sweden king of Norway, thus establishing the Union between Sweden and Norway. Norway secured its independence in a loose personal union, with its own Constitution, Separation of powers, and separate government institutions, with only the king and foreign policy in common. This laid the foundation for the dissolution of the union in 1905.
