= Frederik Wilhelm Stabell =

Norwegian military officer and politician (1763–1836)

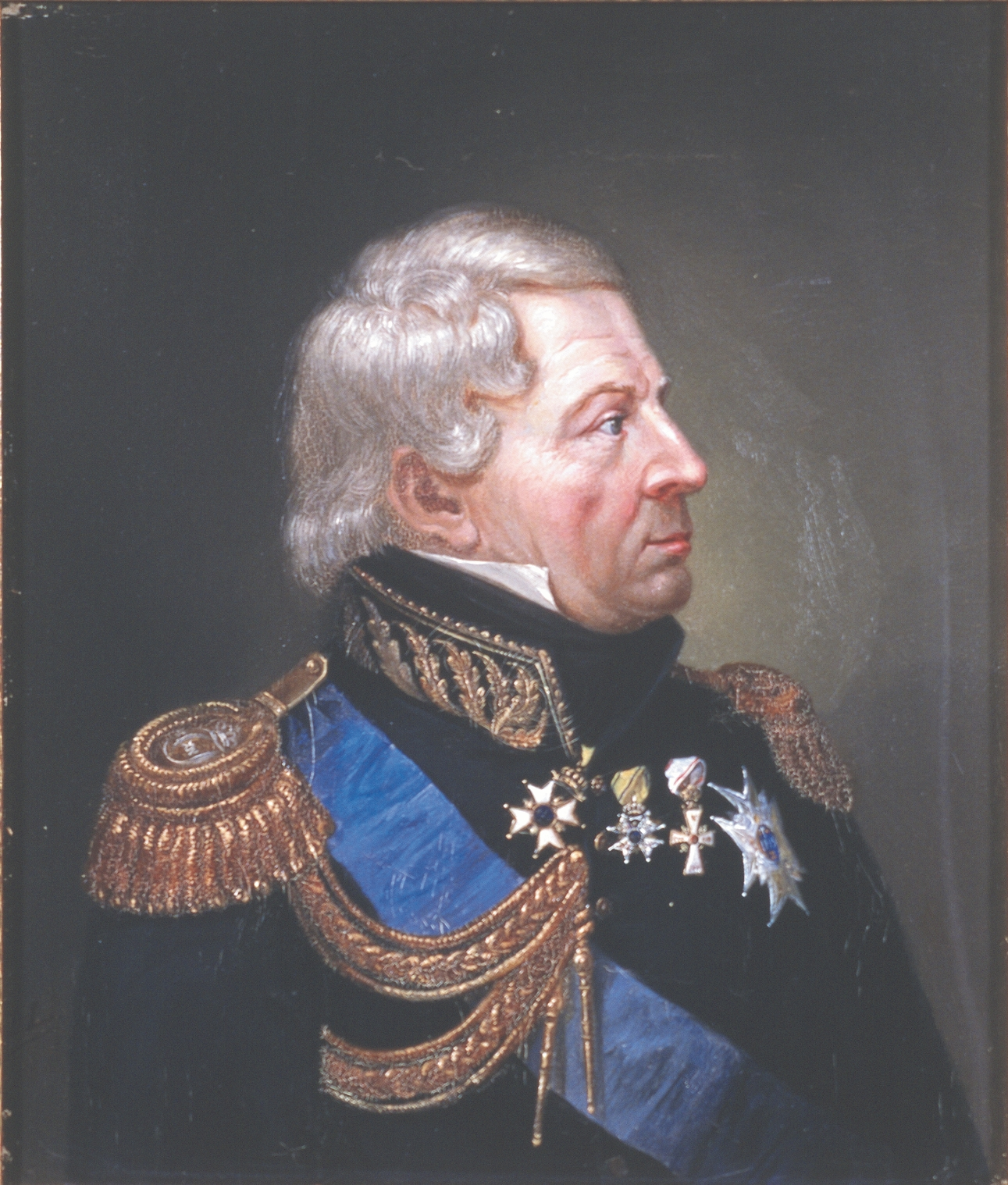
- Born: 25 May 1763; Hole, Norway
- Died: 2 June 1836 (aged 73)
- Occupation(s): Military officer and politician
- Known for: Merits at the Battle of Trangen; Member of the Norwegian Constituent Assembly in 1814
- Awards: Order of the Dannebrog

Frederik Wilhelm Stabell (25 May 1763 – 2 June 1836) was a Norwegian military officer and politician. He was a member of the Norwegian Constituent Assembly in 1814, and ended his military career with the rank of general.

== Personal life ==
Stabell was born in the parish Hole, Ringerike, as the son of holzførster Lars Bastian Stabell and Lucie Marie Bruenech. He married Helene Voigt in 1792. He died in Christiania in 1836.

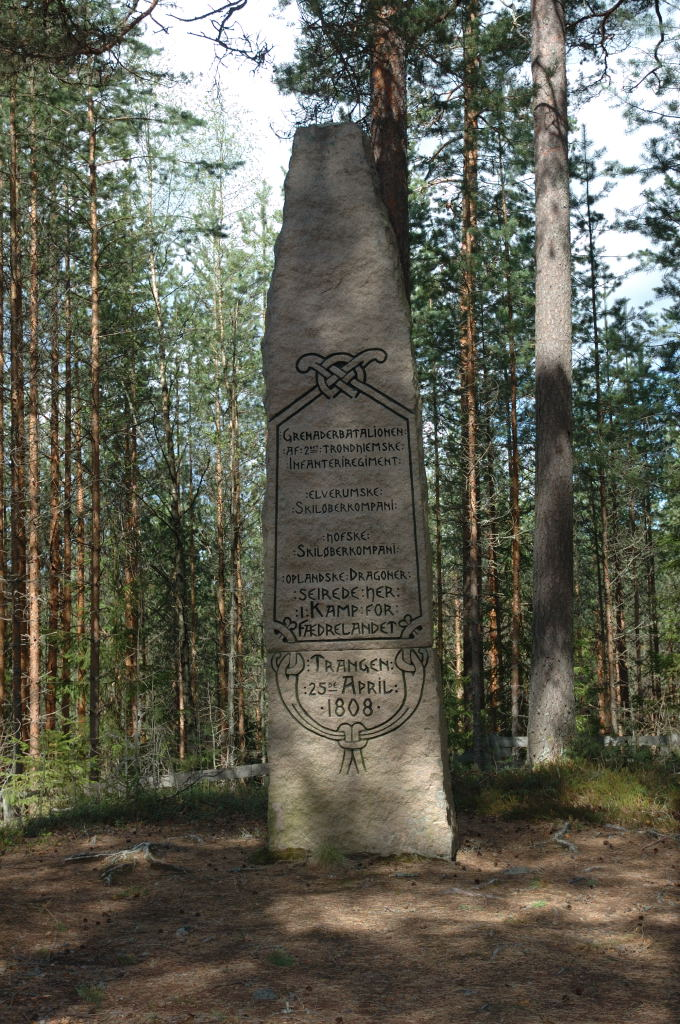
Memorial of the battle of Trangen in Norway in 1808

== Military career ==
Stabell served in the Infantry Regiment of Southern Norway from 1777, and studied at the Norwegian Military Academy in Christiania (Norwegian: Den frie mathematiske Skole) from 1780 to 1783. After a period out of the military, he resumed his military career, first as a non-commissioned officer at the Sleswick Infantry Regiment. From 1786 he served at the Kongsberg Infantry Company, which was incorporated in the newly formed Norske gevorbne jegerkorps in 1788. He held the rank of Captain from 1791, commanded his own company from 1801, was interim commander of the Søndenfjeldske skiløperbataljon from 1805, and was given the rank of Major in 1807. He was decorated Knight of the Order of Dannebrog in 1808, for his merits at the battle of Trangen and at Jaren during the Dano-Swedish War. From 1809 to 1810 he was interim commander at the Kongsvinger Fortress, and thereafter he served at the Akershusiske skarpskytterregiment, with the rank of Lieutenant Colonel from 1811. During the Swedish-Norwegian War in 1814 he commanded 3,000 troops. He was appointed Colonel and commander of the 2nd Akershusiske Infanteribrigade in 1818, was appointed Major General in 1818, Lieutenant General in 1821, and General in 1833.

== Political career ==
Stabell represented the Akershusiske skarpskytterregiment and Smaalenenes amt at the Norwegian Constituent Assembly in 1814.
