= Langnes, Østfold =

Village in Østfold, Norway

Coordinates: 59°36′21″N 11°07′33″E

Langnes is a village in Indre Østfold municipality in Østfold, Norway.

The town is most known for the historically important Battle of Langnes which occurred during the events of 1814.
