= Magnus Björnstjerna =

Swedish count and military general

His Excellency The High Well-born Count Magnus Björnstjerna
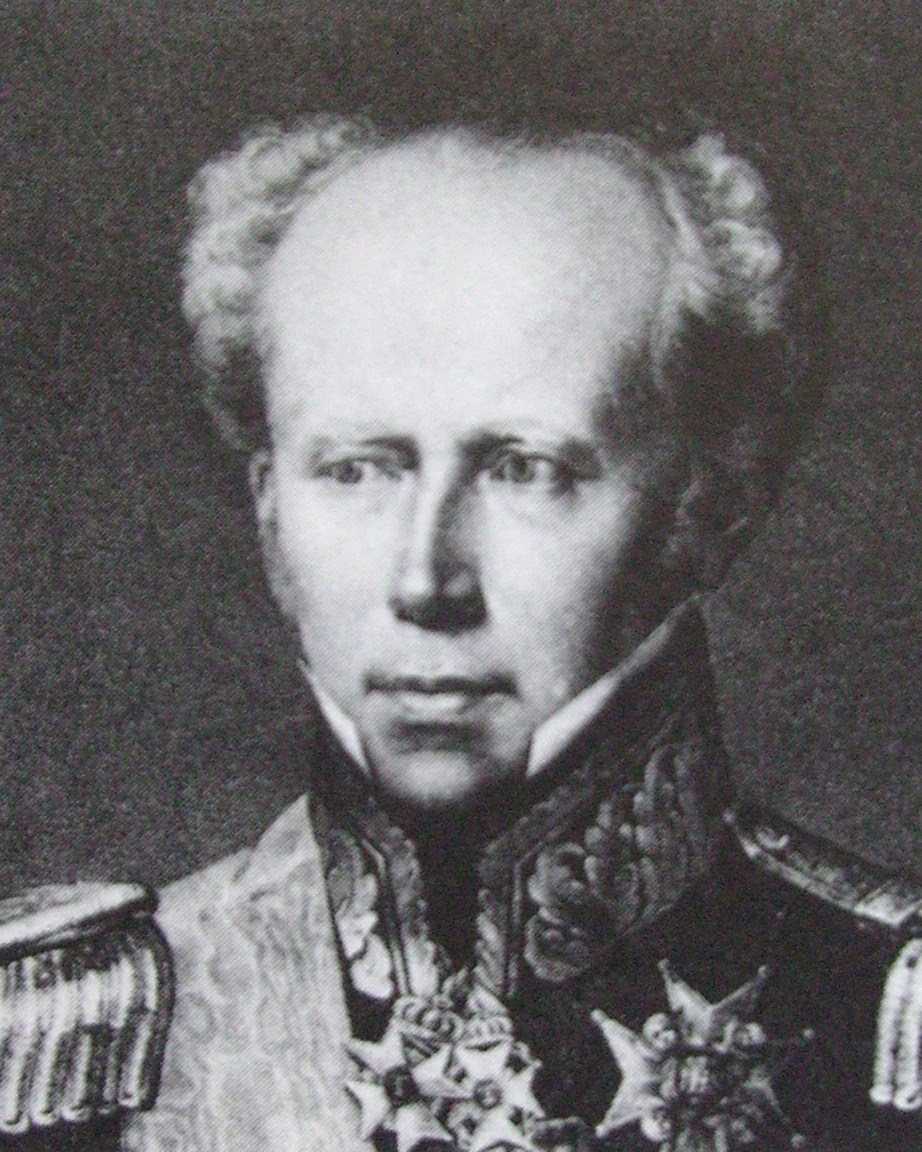
- Born: 10 October 1779; Dresden, Electorate of Saxony
- Died: 6 October 1847 (aged 67); Stockholm, Sweden
- Relatives: Magnus Beronius (grandfather)
- Military career
- Branch: Swedish Army
- Service years: 1793–1843
- Rank: General
- Conflicts: Finnish War; Battle of Haistilla; Battle of Pyhäjoki; Battle of Sickajokki; Battle of Nykarleby; Battle of Lapua; Battle of Rimito Kramp; Battle of Kauhajoki; Battle of Oravais; War of the Sixth Coalition
- Other work: Minister in London 1828–46

Count Magnus Fredrik Ferdinand Björnstjerna (10 October 1779 – 6 October 1847) was a Swedish count and military general, son of the envoy to Sachsen Magnus Olof Björnstjerna and his wife, countess Vilhelmina von Hagen. He was the grandson of archbishop Magnus Beronius.

== Biography ==
At the age of 14, Björnstjerna was sent to Sweden, and attained the same year the rank of ensign (Swedish: fänrik) upon enrolling in The King's Guard. During the Finnish War he was the head adjutant at the Finnish Army's general staff, and participated in the major military campaigns during the war. The same year he was appointed major in the Västmanland Regiment. He was one of the most prominent participants in the Swedish revolution of 1809; when it ended he was sent on a secret mission to Napoleon I.

In 1812 he was appointed colonel of Kalmar Regiment, and participated in the war in Germany, notably the attack on Dessau, the Battle of Fredrikort and other parts of the military campaigns. In 1814 he became major general and participated in warfare on the opposite side of the Rhine. In the same year he became the head of Field marshal Curt von Stedingk's staff, and was appointed to adjutant general of foreign affairs at the army in Norway, where he led the negotiations that led to the Convention of Moss of 1814.

In 1815 he was appointed adjutant general for the Swedish Army and in 1820 to lieutenant general. Björnstjerna was from 1828 to 1846 the Swedish Minister Resident in London. In 1815 he was created Baron (Swedish: friherre) stånd, count in 1826, he was appointed the Royal Order of the Seraphim in 1838 and in 1841 the Lord of the Realm. In 1843 he was appointed marshal.
