= Swedish–Norwegian War =

War fought between Sweden and Norway

- Part of the Napoleonic Wars
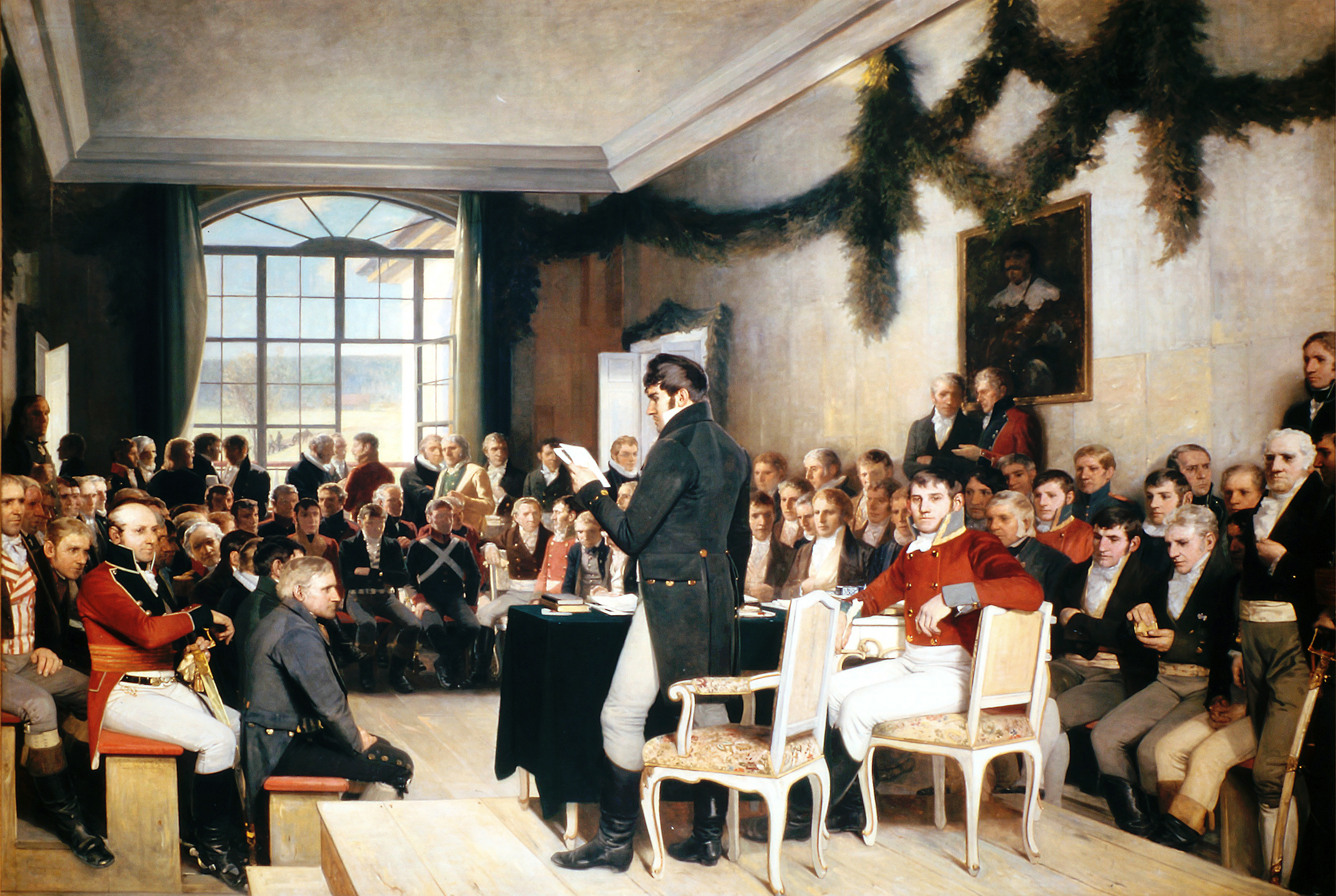
- The constituent assembly at Eidsvoll in 1814
Date	26 July – 14 August, 1814 (2 weeks and 5 days)
Location	Norway
Result	Swedish victory
Territorial changes	Norway enters a personal union with Sweden

Belligerents
Norway	Sweden

Commanders and leaders
(Norway) Christian Frederick; (Norway) Johannes Sejersted; (Norway) Fredrik Haxthausen; (Norway) Thomas Fasting; (Norway) Andreas Krebs; (Norway) Nils Hals; (Norway) Frederik Stabell; (Norway) Diderik Hegermann; (Norway) Johan Spørck	Charles XIII; Charles XIV John; Carl Gahn; Eberhard Vegesack; Bror Cederström; Magnus Björnstjerna; Gustav Mörner; Pehr Brändström

Strength
30,000 men 8 field batteries 7 brigs 150 gunboats	45,523–66,800 men 4 field batteries 4 ships of the line 5 frigates 24 smaller ships 60 gunboats

Casualties and losses
Total: 678–728; 152–178 killed 163–189 wounded 207 surrendered 151 captured 2 gunboats sunk 2 guns lost	Total: 626–666; 151–170 killed 312–332 wounded 179 captured

War of the Sixth Coalition:
Swedish–Norwegian War (1814)

The Swedish–Norwegian War (Note: Also known as the Campaign against Norway (Swedish: Fälttåget mot Norge), the 1814 War with Sweden (Norwegian: 1814 Krigen med Sverige), the War of Cats or the Norwegian War of Independence.) was a war fought between Sweden and Norway in the summer of 1814. According to the Treaty of Kiel, Norway would enter a union with Sweden under Charles XIII of Sweden. The war resulted in Norway being forced into the United Kingdoms of Sweden and Norway, but with its own constitution and parliament. The war marked the last time Sweden participated in an armed conflict with another nation until 2011, and its conclusion signalled the beginning of the country's long period of military neutrality.

== Background ==
=== Treaty of Kiel ===
As early as in 1812, prior to the Napoleonic invasion of Russia, the Swedish Crown Prince Charles John (Karl Johan) – formerly Marshal of France Jean Baptiste Bernadotte – had entered into an agreement with Tsar Alexander I that Russia would support a Swedish attack on Norway in order to force Denmark–Norway to cede its northern part to Sweden. The Swedish attack against Norway was postponed however, due to the fluid state of the conflict between Napoleon and the Sixth Coalition. The Swedish Army and, incidentally, Karl Johan's skills as a general, were urgently needed against France in Central Europe. On 18 May 1813, Swedish troops re-occupied Swedish Pomerania and deployed against Napoleon's forces as a result of treaties between Karl Johan (on behalf of Sweden), Great Britain and Prussia, which ceded Norway to Sweden for its participation in the war, becoming effective after France and its allies (including Denmark–Norway) were defeated.

In early December, Karl Johan led an invasion of Denmark with his Allied Army of the North that included Swedes, Russians and North Germans. The Danes were outnumbered and were unable to mount a coherent defense against Karl Johan's battle-hardened army. Within a few days, the Danes were forced out of Holstein and into Jutland proper. By 14 December, Bernadotte agreed to an armistice and peace talks began in Kiel on the basis of ceding Norway to the Swedish king in return for Swedish Pomerania, additional territory in North Germany, specifics to be decided at the general peace conference following the cessation of hostilities between the Sixth Coalition and Imperial France, as well as 1,000,000 Riksdalers. The Danish position was hopeless and by early January 1814, King Frederick VI of Denmark–Norway reconciled himself to the necessity of losing Norway.

By the Treaty of Kiel, signed on 13 January, King Frederick VI had to cede the Kingdom of Norway to the king of Sweden, by which the two nations would enter a union. However, this treaty was not accepted by the Norwegian people, who refused to be simply a bargaining chip. Elements of the Danish government also covertly supported Norway's determination for independence. Ultimately, Denmark would pay a catastrophic price for the treaty, as Karl Johan viewed this support, no matter how covert, as betrayal and a violation of the treaty, and this would later be reflected in the final peace settlement at the Congress of Vienna, which voided Kiel's promise to compensate Denmark for its loss of Norway with Swedish Pomerania, various additional Northern German territory, and 1,000,000 Riksdalers.

=== Norwegian Constituent Assembly ===
An insurrection broke out, led by Prince Christian Frederick of Denmark, heir presumptive to the thrones of Denmark and Norway and Governor-general of Norway (and later King Christian VIII of Denmark). He gathered a constitutional assembly which adopted the liberal constitution of 17 May, with that constitution also naming Christian Frederick as king of an independent Norway.

As the head of the new state, Christian Frederick desperately tried to gain support from the United Kingdom, or any of the other major powers within the Sixth Coalition, in order to maintain Norway's independence. However, the foreign diplomats, more concerned with Napoleon, refused to promise any outside support to the Norwegians.

== Armies ==
The Norwegian Army mustered 30,000 men, and it had taken up positions away from the border with Sweden, in the fear of being outflanked. The Royal Norwegian Navy had few vessels, and most of them were stationed at the islands of Hvaler, close to Sweden.

The Swedish Army consisted of 45,000–66,800 well-equipped soldiers who were veterans of the German Campaign of 1813. The Swedish Navy had a number of large vessels and a capacity for moving and landing troops as well as assistance from the British Royal Navy.

=== Major commanders ===
- Charles John (Karl Johan) – former Marshal of France Jean Baptiste Bernadotte and in 1813 Crown Prince of Sweden
- Magnus Björnstjerna – Swedish general
- Johannes Klingenberg Sejersted – Norwegian major general
- Frederik Gottschalck von Haxthausen – Norwegian minister of finance and Oberhofmarschall

== War ==
The hostilities opened on 26 July with a swift Swedish naval attack against the Norwegian gunboats at Hvaler. The Norwegian army was evacuated and the vessels managed to escape, but they did not take part in the rest of the war. The main Swedish offensive came across the border at Halden, bypassing and surrounding the fortress of Fredriksten, and then continuing north, while a second force of 6,000 soldiers landed at Kråkerøy outside of Fredrikstad. This town surrendered the next day. This was the start of a pincer movement around the main part of the Norwegian army at Rakkestad.

On the front towards Kongsvinger, the forces were more evenly matched, and the Norwegian army eventually stopped the Swedish advance at Lier on 2 August, and won another victory at Matrand on 5 August. On 3 August, King Christian Frederick reached the front at Østfold and was persuaded to change his strategy and use the 6,000 men stationed at Rakkestad in a counterattack against the Swedes. The order to counterattack was given on 5 August, but the order was recalled a few hours later. The Norwegian forces therefore withdrew over the Glomma river at Langnes in Askim. The last major battle of the war was fought on 9 August at the bridgehead at Langnes, where the Swedish forces once more were driven back.

Sweden then attempted to outflank the Norwegian line, and successfully did so during the Battle of Kjølberg Bridge on 14 August. The Swedes then had a clear path to Kristiania, the Norwegian capital. In addition, the British blockade of Norway cut off trade and military supplies, which combined with the proximity of Swedish armies eventually made the Norwegians' military situation unsustainable.

Although the Norwegian Army had won at Langnes, it was nevertheless clear to both the Norwegian and Swedish military authorities that a defeat was inevitable. Even as they had managed to deliver several minor offensive blows to the Swedes, it was considered impossible to try to stop the Swedes in the long run. The Swedish offer of negotiations was therefore accepted as the war had put a heavy strain on the Norwegian finances. Every day of delay in securing Norway by the Swedes brought uncertainty to them regarding the outcome, so both parties were interested in a quick end to the war.

To the ordinary Norwegian soldier the war had seemed ill-prepared and ill-fought. The defeat was blamed on Christian Frederick and the Norwegian general Haxthausen; the latter was accused of treason. For the Norwegian government it had probably been more of a matter of getting the best possible bargaining position, as without the support of major powers Norway's independence was impossible to secure, whereas by agreeing to talks following the victory at Langnes Norway was in a situation where it could avoid an unconditional surrender.

== Aftermath ==
On 10 August, Charles XIV John presented a proposal for a cease-fire. The proposal included a major concession – Charles XIV John, on behalf of the Swedish government as regent for his ill adopted father, accepted the Eidsvoll constitution. Negotiations started in Moss, Norway on 10 August, and after a few days of hard negotiations, a cease fire agreement, called the Convention of Moss, was signed on 14 August. Christian Frederick was forced to abdicate as king of Norway, but Norway remained nominally independent within a personal union with Sweden, under the Swedish king. Its constitution was upheld with only such amendments as were required to allow it to enter into the union, and the two united kingdoms retained separate institutions, except for the king and the foreign service and policy.

== See also ==
- Gunboat War
- Kingdom of Norway (1814)
