= Convention of Moss =

1814 ceasefire agreement between Sweden and Norway

Coordinates: 59°26′22″N 10°40′10″E

Convention of Moss (Mossekonvensjonen)
- Type: Armistice agreement de facto peace treaty
- Signed: 14 August 1814
- Location: Moss, Norway
- Effective: Immediately
- Expiration: Three weeks following the first parliamentary session, effectively indefinitely
- Signatories: Generals Magnus Björnstjerna and A. F. Skjöldebrand of Sweden, ministers Niels Aall and Jonas Collett of the Government of Norway
- Parties: Sweden; Norway
- Language: French

The Convention of Moss (Mossekonvensjonen) was a ceasefire agreement signed on 14 August 1814 between the King of Sweden and the Norwegian government. It followed the Swedish-Norwegian War due to Norway's claim to sovereignty. It also became the de facto peace agreement and formed the basis for the personal union between Sweden and Norway that was established when the Norwegian Stortinget (Parliament) elected Charles XIII of Sweden as king of Norway on 4 November 1814. The Union lasted until Norway declared its dissolution in 1905.

== Background ==
In 1814, Denmark–Norway was on the losing side in the Napoleonic Wars. Under the Treaty of Kiel, negotiated on 14 January 1814, Norway was ceded to the king of Sweden, of the new House of Bernadotte. In an attempt to take control of their destiny, the Norwegians convened a constitutional assembly at Eidsvoll and, on 17 May 1814, signed the Constitution of Norway. The viceroy and heir to the thrones of Denmark and Norway, Prince Christian Frederik, was elected by the assembly as king.

The de facto Swedish ruler, Crown Prince Charles John, acting on behalf of King Charles XIII of Sweden, rejected the premise of an independent Norway and launched a military campaign on 2 July 1814 with an attack on the Hvaler islands and the city of Fredrikstad. The Swedish army was superior in numbers, better equipped and trained and was led by one of Napoleon's foremost generals, the newly-elected Swedish crown prince, Jean Baptiste Bernadotte.

The hostilities opened on 26 July with a swift Swedish naval attack against the Norwegian gunboats at Hvaler. The Norwegian vessels managed to escape, but they did not take part in the rest of the war. The main Swedish thrust came across the border at Halden, bypassing and surrounding the fortress of Fredriksten, and then continuing north, and a second force of 6,000 soldiers landed at Kråkerøy, outside of Fredrikstad. The town surrendered the next day.

That was the start of a pincer movement around the main part of the Norwegian army at Rakkestad. The Norwegian army delivered several offensive blows to the Swedes, thus applying pressure on the Swedes to accept Norway as a sovereign nation and to open up negotiations. The tactic worked, and when talks began on 7 August, Charles John accepted the democratic Norwegian constitution. Armistice negotiations were concluded by Norway at Moss on 14 August 1814 and by Sweden in the city of Fredrikstad on 15 August 1814.

== Terms ==
The Treaty of Kiel was thus tacitly subdued and a new union on more equal terms negotiated. The convention comprised four documents with the following main points:

- The agreement was entered into between the Swedish crown prince on behalf of the Swedish King and the Norwegian government. The Swedes did not recognise Christian Frederik's claim to the Norwegian throne and so he was not officially a party to the agreement, which was negotiated and signed by two of his ministers, Niels Aall and Jonas Collett.
- The Norwegian parliament was to convene by the end of September or the beginning of October to ratify the convention.
- The King of Sweden accepted the Norwegian constitution, with only such amendments as were necessary to accommodate the union with Sweden. All changes were to be accepted by the Norwegian parliament.
- Christian Frederik was to abandon all claims to the Norwegian crown and to leave the country after he had convened the parliament.

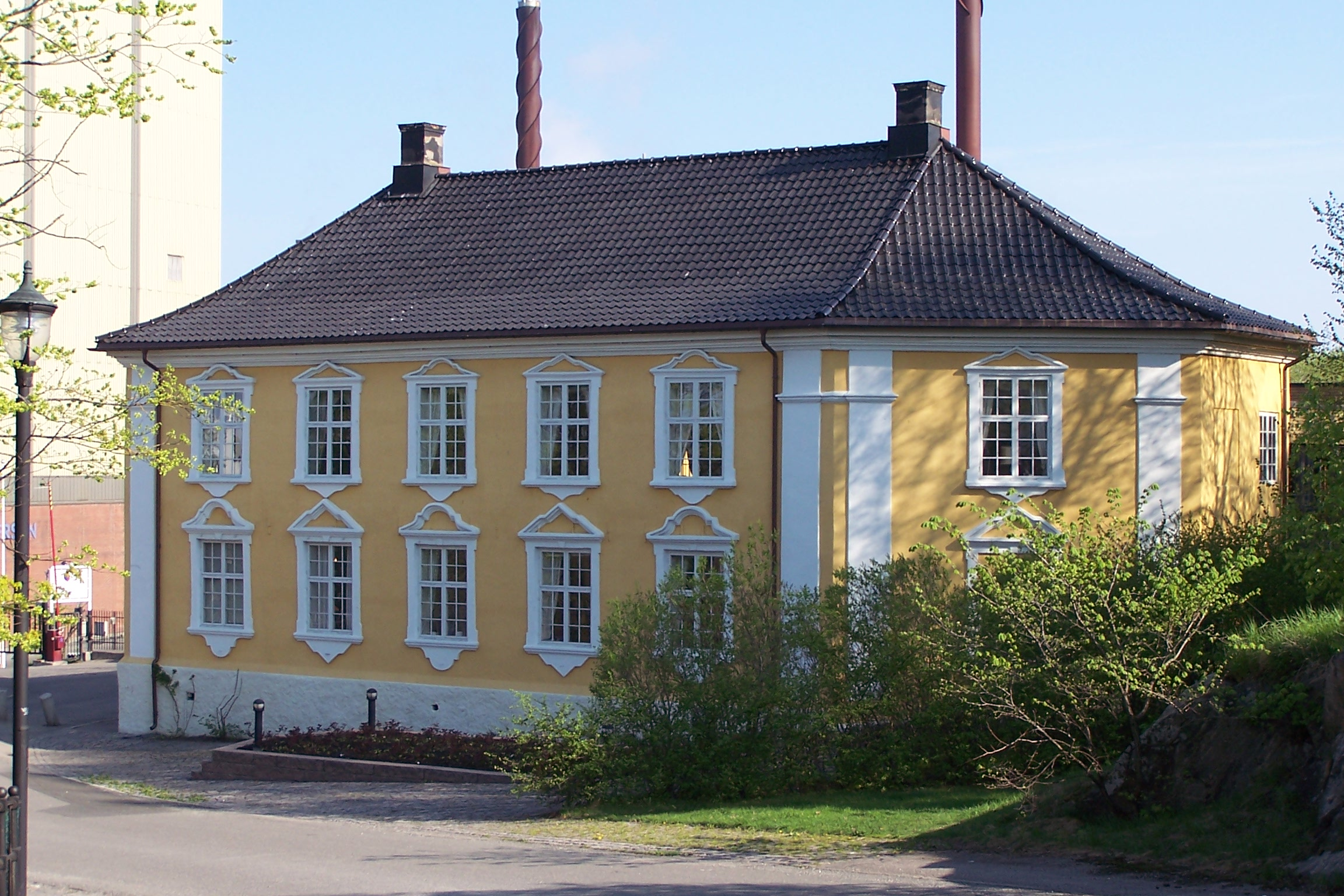
The Moss Ironworks main office, where the Convention of Moss was negotiated and signed.

The greatest disagreement was in the question of Christian Frederick's unconditional renunciation of the throne, which he had to accept and to find a wording that meant that the Union should not be entered into as a result of the Kiel Treaty but by the treaty that became signed on Moss. At Norway's insistence, the parties agreed on a wording that avoided declaring the Swedish king to be the Norwegian king before he was elected by the Storting. The Norwegian Council of State (Det Norske Statsrådsalen) would, until further notice, take over the executive authority and sign its decisions with highest authority (paa allerhøieste Befaling). That was one formulation that the Norwegians could accept since it did not mean that the King of Sweden had become King of Norway on 14 January.

Many Norwegians were shocked by their government's concessions, and when Swedish General Magnus Björnstjerna, who had led the Swedish negotiations, arrived in Christiania, Norway, he got an unfriendly welcome. Norwegians also directed their resentment toward their own leaders and what they perceived as an ineffective military defence. Over time, public opinion shifted. The convention was a significant improvement over the terms dictated to Denmark–Norway at the Treaty of Kiel. Notably, Norway was no longer to be treated as a Swedish conquest but as an equal party in a union of two independent states. Both the principle and the substance of the Norwegian Constitution were accepted. Christian Frederik's actions in 1814 greatly helped in allowing Norway to go into the union with Sweden as an equal and independent part in which Norway retained its own parliament and separate institutions except for the common king and foreign service.

That was the last war between Sweden and Norway as well as Sweden's last war.

== See also ==
- Union between Sweden and Norway
- Treaty of Kiel
- Norway in 1814
- Swedish-Norwegian War (1814)
- Constitution of Norway

== Other sources ==
- Sverre Steen (1951) Det frie Norge (Oslo: J.W. Cappelen)
- R. Glenthøj, M. Nordhagen Ottosen (2014) Experiences of War and Nationality in Denmark and Norway, 1807–1815 (Springer) ISBN 9781137313898
