= Battle of Mobekk =

1808 battle between Sweden and Demark-Norway

Coordinates: 60°10′56″N 12°05′35″E

- Part of the Dano-Swedish War of 1808–09
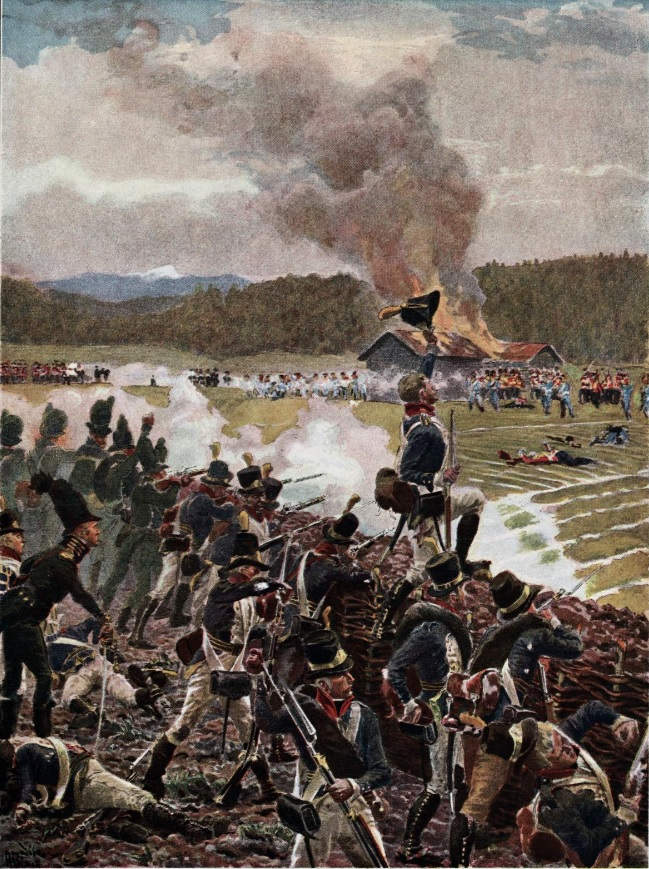
- Battle of Mobekk, by Andreas Bloch
Date	18 May 1808
Location	Mobekk, Norway
Result	Swedish victory

Belligerents
Sweden	Denmark–Norway

Commanders and leaders
Carl Cederström; Nils Fredrik Lagerlöf	(Denmark–Norway) Ditlef von Staffeldt (Denmark–Norway) Johan Georg Ræder

Strength
300	800

Casualties and losses
38	40–269

The Battle of Mobekk was fought on 18 May 1808 between Swedish and Norwegian forces, during the Swedish invasion of Norway. After the Swedish victory at Lier, Bernhard Ditlef von Staffeldt ordered Johan Georg Ræder to attack the right flank of Gustaf Mauritz Armfelt's brigade, along the Skinnarbøl river. The Norwegians managed to force a few Swedish outposts across the river, but met fierce resistance at the main Swedish redoubt at Mobekk; Ræder conducted three fruitless assaults before retreating with his force, after five hours of fighting. The battle had no strategic effect as Armfelt retreated out of Norway in May and June, after misinterpreting the orders from the Swedish king Gustav IV Adolf advocating for him to act defensively.

== Background ==
After the Swedish victory at Lier, Gustaf Mauritz Armfelt remained with the first Swedish brigade around Lier, awaiting the spring to break up the ice at the Glomma before resuming the offensive towards the fortress of Kongsvinger. Several Swedish detachments were sent from other brigades to reinforce his position. A few minor skirmishes occurred in the vicinity without significant results, most notably around Masterud. In mid-May, the Norwegian commander Christian August ordered Bernhard Ditlef von Staffeldt to conduct a counterattack against the Swedish outposts at the Skinnarbøl river (between the Vinger and Digeren lakes), covering Armfelt's right flank. Staffeldt ordered Johan Georg Ræder to march with 800 men (in three columns) against the Swedish outposts along the river, consisting of about 300 men under Carl Cederström. The Swedes had several entrenchments north of the river (some of which were unfinished), of which Mobekk was the most significant.

== Battle ==
The left Norwegian column, personally led by Ræder, attacked Mobekk at 11:30. Mobekk was guarded by 90 men of the Hälsinge and Närke-Värmland regiments, under captain Ström. Subsequently, the remaining columns also attacked the nearby Swedish positions at Skansgarden and Skinnarbøl, of which both received orders to withdraw south across the river. The Swedes burnt the bridge behind them, denying every attempt made by the Norwegians to ford the river. The Norwegians then sent additional reinforcements towards Mobekk, where intense fighting took place. At 12:00, the Swedes at Mobekk also received reinforcements, consisting of 40 men from the Värmland Jägers under captain Lagerlöf, who seized the overall command. In total, about 130 Swedes faced 450 Norwegians at the Mobekk redoubt.

The Swedes were suppressed with accurate fire from some sharpshooters who had climbed up on the roofs of some nearby houses. Meanwhile, the Norwegians conducted three assaults on the redoubt, while another contingent attempted to ford the river in the Swedish rear; Lagerlöf counter-attacked and threw them back, while the Norwegian attacks against the redoubt were repulsed. To inspire his comrades, a Swedish sergeant (named Diricker) climbed up the defenses each time the Norwegians attacked and swung his hat around, mocking them. At 16:45, the Norwegians retreated as Ræder was unable to rally his forces to mount another attack. The Swedes retook their previous positions while Lagerlöf's Jägers pursued the fleeing enemy for more than one kilometre.

== Aftermath ==
The Norwegians admitted to a loss of 7 men killed, 27 wounded and 6 captured, which, in regards to the intensity of the fighting—which had resulted in three failed assaults—is considered as too low by a few sources. The Swedes estimated higher Norwegian losses; one report mentions as many as 269 (including 16 captured). The Swedes, who fought the majority of the battle within their redoubt, had suffered 5 men killed and 33 wounded (including one contusion). After the battle, Staffeldt sent a letter to Christian August in which he explicated the lack of capable officers, as well as trained privates, as a reason for the defeat. Although, he complimented the bravery of his soldiers. In retaliation for his defeat, Staffeldt with 150 men attacked a small Swedish outpost of 29 men at Jerpset in the night of 24–25 May, capturing or killing them.

On 24 May, Armfelt received orders from the Swedish king Gustav IV Adolf to fall back to a more advantageous position; the king planned to land an Anglo-Swedish force at Zealand to attack Denmark, while Armfelt would act defensively. Armfelt, however, misinterpreted the order and began an all-out retreat from Norway on 29 May. By mid-June, the Swedes had completely abandoned Norway with the exception of a small contingent at Prestebakke and berby; These were forced to surrender after being surprised and defeated at Prestebakke by an overwhelming Norwegian force on 10 June.

== Citations and sources ==
=== Sources ===
- Generalstaben (1915). Sveriges krig åren 1808 och 1809, Volume 6 (in Swedish). Stockholm: Kongl. boktryckeriet P. A. Norstedt & söner.
- Angell, Henrik (1914). Syv-Aars-Krigen for 17. Mai 1807–1814 (in Norwegian). Kristiania: H. Aschehoug & Co.
- Meijer, Carl Fredrik (1867). Kriget emellan Sverige och Danmark, åren 1808 och 1809 (in Swedish). Stockholm: Oscar L. Lamms Förlag.
- Prytz, Harold Oscar (1867). Historiska upplysningar om Svenska och Norska arméernas regementer och kårer jemte flottorna under ledning (in Swedish). Stockholm: P. B. Eklund.
