= Battle of Berby =

1808 battle between Sweden and Denmark-Norway

Coordinates: 58°57′47″N 11°29′15″E

- Part of the Dano-Swedish War of 1808–09
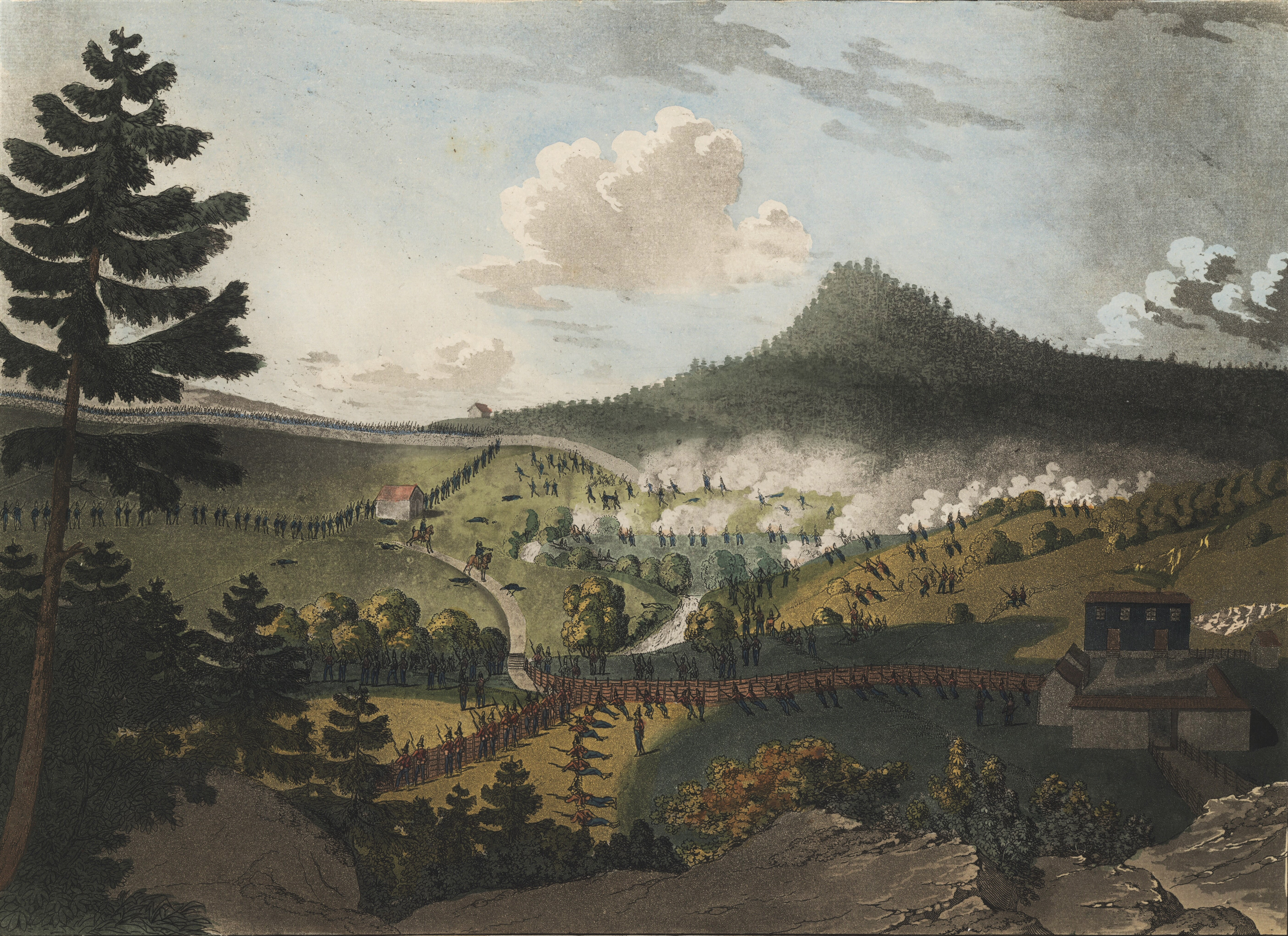
- Battle of Berby, by Niels Truslew
Date	12 September 1808
Location	Berby, Norway
Result	See aftermath

Belligerents
Sweden	Denmark–Norway

Commanders and leaders
(Sweden) Carl Henric Posse	(Denmark–Norway) Andreas Samuel Krebs

Strength
600–650	650; 2 guns

Casualties and losses
3 killed 45 wounded	6 killed 15 wounded 23 captured 1 gun captured

The Battle of Berby was fought on 12 September 1808, between Swedish and Norwegian forces, during the Dano-Swedish War of 1808–09. Ever since the Battle of Prestebakke, the western front had been relatively calm, until colonel Posse launched a reconnaissance towards the Norwegian positions around at Berby, under Andreas Samuel Krebs; the Swedes pushed the Norwegians in front of them, all the way to Berby itself, where the Norwegians made a sturdy hold. At that time, Posse requested a ceasefire, as his reconnaissance had essentially evolved into a larger encounter; krebs accepted and after half an hour, the Swedes went back across the border. The battle was the last significant engagement between Swedish and Norwegian forces, that year.

== Background ==
Ever since 10 June, only a few insignificant engagements had been fought—with the exception of Vilsberg, on 2 September, where the Norwegians suffered heavy casualties. The Swedish king, Gustav IV Adolf, prioritized Finland more, and thus relocated several regiments from the Norwegian–Swedish border to that front. Witnessing as the Swedish defenses progressively dwindled, and in retaliation for 2 September, the Norwegian major in Enningdal, Andreas Samuel Krebs, conducted a short offensive east, on 4 September, capturing 11 Swedes at Måsakasan.

In response to this, Swedish colonel Posse decided to go on a large reconnaissance towards the Norwegian positions at Berby, in Enningdal; aside from gaining intelligence, Posse wanted to relieve the Norwegian pressure to the east, while also allowing his newly raised Landwehr to gain experience. On 12 September, he marched towards Berby with two brigades; the 5:th Brigade (500 men), under captain Ström, from the south-west (Nösteröd), and the 4:th Brigade, in two columns, under the majors Grönhagen (500 men and 2 guns) and Rappe (400 men) respectively, from the south (Vassbotten); in total, 1,550 men, including officers. In Enningdal, Krebs had 1,300 men available, of which 700 and 4 guns at Ende, Prestebakke and Svenningsbøen, and 600 around Berby (of whom 260 in the outposts and on patrol).

== Battle ==
The vanguard (125 men) of the Swedish 5:th Brigade was discovered around 07:30—through the thick morning fog—by a Norwegian outpost at Tyslingmoen (130 men); the Norwegians counter-attacked, with some initial success, but were soon thrown back towards Ødegårdene, where they received reinforcements (60 men). The Swedish forces then launched a swift bayonet attack, forcing the Norwegians to retreat within the farm itself, where Krebs arrived with 200 men from Berby and two guns from Ende. The Swedish vanguard was then temporarily halted, but, as soon as more troops arrived, once again pressed on. Despite being met by canister shot and grenades, the Swedes managed to reach the Norwegian position which compelled Krebs to order a withdrawal towards the Berget farm (directly south of the Berby bridge); confusion arose among the Norwegians, who lost one of the guns and 6 men as prisoners to the pursuing Swedes.

The renewed Norwegian position had the cover of a stone wall, from where the Swedish advance was halted. As Krebs rode to prepare the defenses at Berby, major Fischer was given temporary command over the Norwegian forces. His right wing was slowly being pushed back by the Swedes, who then tried to ford the Enningdal river north of Berby, but were checked by the Norwegian fire. By this time, after three hours of fighting, the Norwegian force (including the outposts) had swollen to 650 men. The bulk of Ström's 5th Brigade had, meanwhile, gone back to Ødegårdene to await the arrival of the 4:th Brigade; the two columns of this brigade had reached Kirkebøen (approximately 6 kilometres from Berget) at 08:00, after which Grönhagen was ordered to go east across the river to cover the right flank of Rappe. At 08:30, Rappe's column continued towards Berby, marching along the west side of the river with a vanguard of about 100 men. After some harassment, a Norwegian outpost, followed by another force which had come to its assistance, was pushed east across the river—thus leaving the left flank of the Norwegian position at Berget exposed.

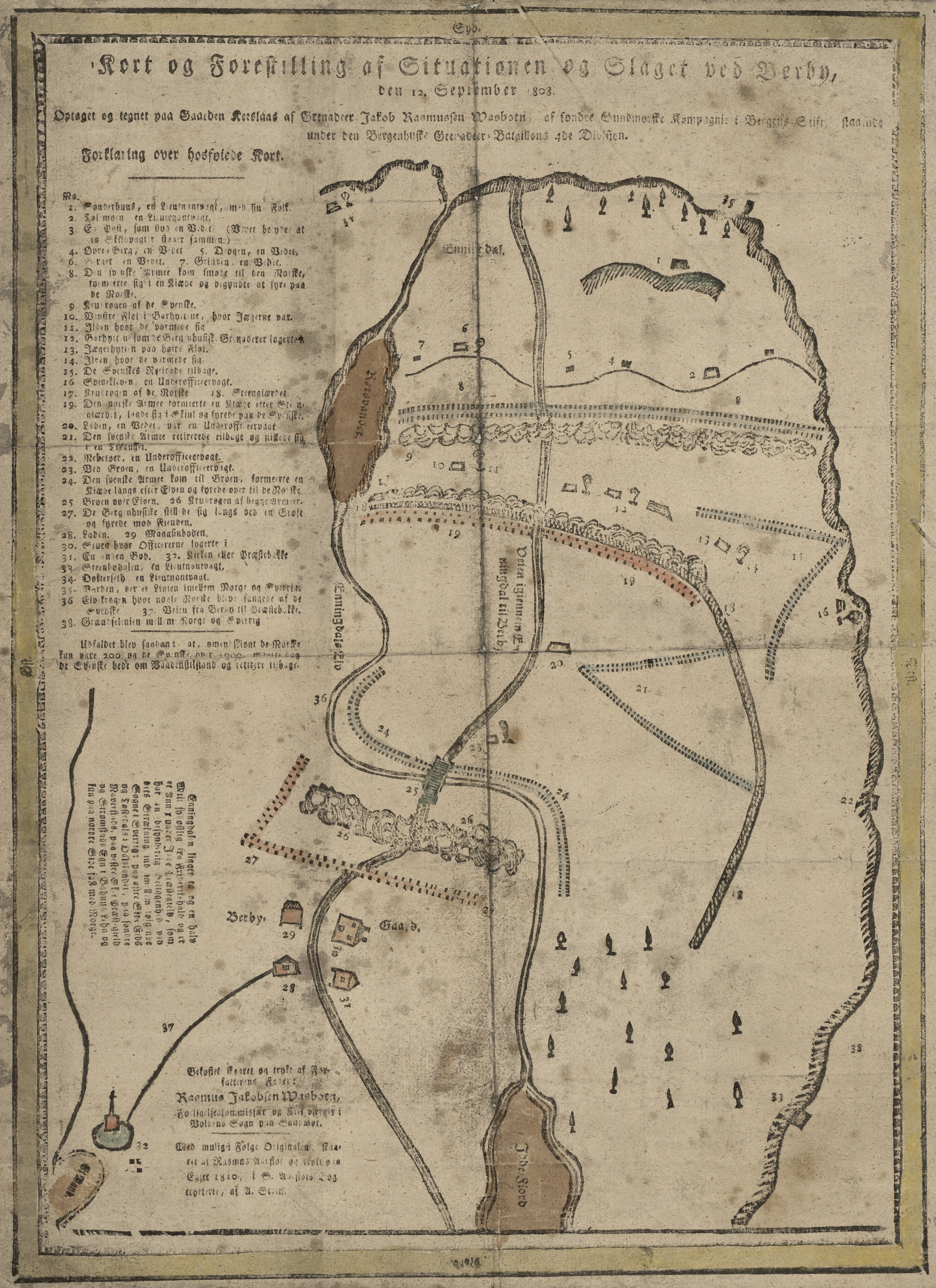
Map over the Battle, by Jacob Vassbotn

At 10:30, Rappe's vanguard arrived and immediately shattered the Norwegian flank with a bayonet charge, taking 17 prisoners, while Ström renewed the attacks in the front. As a result, the Norwegians were forced over the river, to Berby, where they established a new position on the heights. The Swedes pursued to the bridge, which they twice attempted to storm, without result, while the river was mostly too deep to ford. By this time, at 12:00, Posse arrived at the battlefield in person and requested a ceasefire with Krebs, since the fighting had greatly exceeded the intentions of his reconnaissance—both sides were also running low on ammo. Krebs hesitated at first, but eventually agreed upon half an hour long ceasefire, during which time both sides collected their many wounded. As it ended, the Swedes marched back, carefully shadowed by the Norwegians. The Swedish forces returned to their initial defensive positions across the border, while the Norwegians re-established their old outposts facing them.

== Aftermath ==
The result of the battle is somewhat disputed; Posse considered the reconnaissance as successful, and writes: "My troops were given the opportunity to convince themselves of our combat-superiority"—even though his Landwehr never saw any action. Only 600 men, or just above, out of his total force had been engaged (the 5:th Brigade and Rappe's vanguard); the possibility of a crushing victory, had he awaited his second brigade and not negotiated with the enemy, had been lost. Krebs, on the other hand, believed that the Swedes had been forced to retreat and, in contrast to Posse, regarded the performance of his own troops as superior to that of the Swedes; they counted about 650 men during the engagement as, just like with the Swedes, he kept large forces in reserve to secure his flanks (Prestebakke and Svenningsbøen), against the threat of Grönhagen's column.

The Swedes had suffered slightly higher casualties, with 3 killed and 45 wounded, while the Norwegians had suffered more devastating losses, with 6 killed, 15 wounded (two of which soon died), 23 captured (including five wounded) and one gun. The Battle of Berby was the last significant engagement at this front. Early next year, the Swedish king was deposed in a revolution (the supreme commander of the Norwegian forces, Christian August, was later chosen as the Swedish crown prince). Subsequently, the last major offensive of the war occurred when Norwegian troops invaded Jämtland for the second time, after which peace was declared between Denmark–Norway and Sweden in Jönköping, on 10 december 1809.

== Citations and sources ==
=== Sources ===
- Generalstaben (1919). Sveriges krig åren 1808 och 1809, Volume 7 (in Swedish). Stockholm: Kongl. boktryckeriet P. A. Norstedt & söner.
- Angell, Henrik (1914). Syv-Aars-Krigen for 17. Mai 1807–1814 (in Norwegian). Kristiania: H. Aschehoug & Co.
- Meijer, Carl Fredrik (1867). Kriget emellan Sverige och Danmark, åren 1808 och 1809 (in Swedish). Stockholm: Oscar L. Lamms Förlag.
