= Battle of Prestebakke =

Battle of the Dano-Swedish War of 1808–09

Coordinates: 58°59′30″N 11°32′10″E

- Part of the Dano-Swedish War of 1808–09
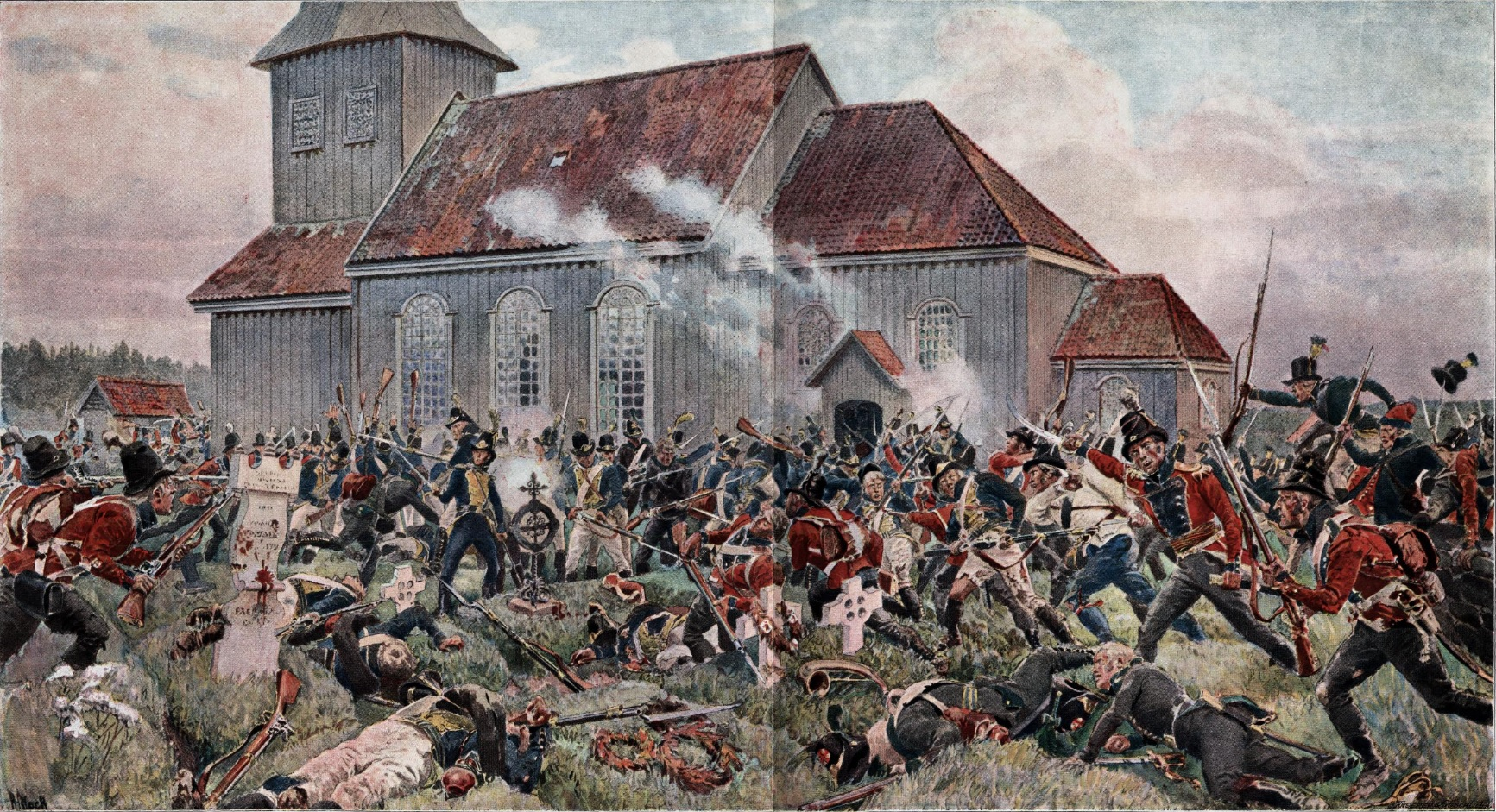
- Battle of Prestebakke, by Andreas Bloch
Date	10 June 1808
Location	Prestebakke, Norway
Result	Dano-Norwegian victory

Belligerents
Sweden	Denmark–Norway

Commanders and leaders
(Sweden) Georg Adlersparre (Sweden) Anton von Knorring (POW)	(Denmark–Norway) Niels Petersen Juul (Denmark–Norway) Arild Huitfeldt

Strength
420	770

Casualties and losses
18 killed 380 captured	12 killed or severely wounded

The Battle of Prestebakke was fought on 10 June 1808, between Swedish and Norwegian forces, during the Dano-Swedish War of 1808–09. After the Swedish retreat out of Norway, a small detachment was left at Prestebakke and Berby. Christian August ordered a Norwegian offensive to drive them out, which was carried out by Arild Huitfeldt. Georg Adlersparre had the overall command, but was not present; instead, von Knorring acted as commander at the battle. He was completely surprised by the Norwegian attack, which led to the capture of the majority of his forces. The battle came with no strategic effects, as the Swedes retaliated on 14 June and retook what had been lost.

== Background ==
After the Battle of Mobekk, and the Swedish retreat, Armfelt left a small force at Prestebakke and Berby. Christian August ordered Juul, the commander of Kongsvinger Fortress, to push the remaining Swedes, under Georg Adlersparre, across the border. A plan was made, after which the task was handed to Arild Huitfeldt, since Juul got seriously ill. Huitfeldt had 876 men available for his attack, which was split into three columns; he would personally lead 230 men in a frontal attack against Prestebakke, while another column of 540 or 550 men would sweep around and attack the Swedes from the rear. The third column, of 106 men, would simultaneously make a diversion attack against Berby. The Swedes had about 420 combatants diverted around Prestebakke, under von Knorring (Adlersparre was not present during the attack), excluding an additional 20 men who were sick. Juul had founded the plan upon the carelessness displayed by the Swedish patrols, which would facilitate a complete surprise.

== Battle ==
The Norwegians split the columns into several detachments, to attack the dispersed Swedish contingents, and to cut their retreat off. The attack in the Swedish rear began at 03:30, which caught the Swedes completely off guard and quickly overwhelmed or forced their outposts back. Knorring conducted a counterattack with about 128 men, but was forced to retreat towards Glenne—after an hour of fighting—as both of his flanks were threatened, and with no reinforcements in sight. By this time, Huitfeldt had likewise begun his frontal attack, which drove the Swedish outposts, facing him, back towards Prestebakke. A desperate struggle now occurred at the church, where several Swedish detachments had rallied; the Swedes fought behind the cemetery wall, but were overwhelmed as the Norwegians managed to encircle the position and break into their defenses.

Knorring continued his fighting-retreat towards Glenne, but was intercepted by a small Norwegian detachment across a stream, 1.3 kilometres away from the church. Knorring ordered his men into Jäger-formation, after which he attempted to break through the Norwegian position; after two failed attacks, and with larger Norwegian forces in pursuit, he eventually surrendered with his remaining 150 men. The third Norwegian column, tasked with attacking Berby—by going on a flotilla through the Iddefjord—landed a small force at Pilegården on 9 June, where a Swedish outpost was forced on the run. The Norwegians then attacked Krokstrand the next day, followed by Berby, where an artillery duel ensued for about an hour, with no losses on either side.

== Aftermath ==
After the battle, the Swedes and Norwegians agreed upon a ceasefire, to collect the many wounded: The Swedes had lost 18 men killed and 380 captured, including 38 wounded. The Norwegian losses are not fully known; they had six men killed and equally many severely wounded, while the complete number of wounded is unknown. Because of his failure in the battle, Knorring was sentenced to six months suspension (it was later altered to only two months). The battle had no strategic effects, as the Swedes retaliated four days later—to restore the Swedish honor—and retook what had been lost; the Norwegians quickly retreated before their much superior enemy. Subsequently, the Swedes abandoned their positions between 20 and 24 June, and went back to Sweden. On 12 September, they would once again cross the border, to reconnoitre towards the Norwegian positions at Berby.

== Citations and sources ==
=== Sources ===
- Generalstaben (1915). Sveriges krig åren 1808 och 1809, Volume 6 (in Swedish). Stockholm: Kongl. boktryckeriet P. A. Norstedt & söner.
- Generalstaben (1919). Sveriges krig åren 1808 och 1809, Volume 7 (in Swedish). Stockholm: Kongl. boktryckeriet P. A. Norstedt & söner.
- Angell, Henrik (1914). Syv-Aars-Krigen for 17. Mai 1807–1814 (in Norwegian). Kristiania: H. Aschehoug & Co.
