= Battle of Lier =

Battle of Lier may refer to two battles between Sweden and Norway in the Lier entrenchment, Norway:

- Battle of Lier (1808)
- Battle of Lier (1814)
