= Boldhusgade 2 =

Building in Copenhagen, Denmark

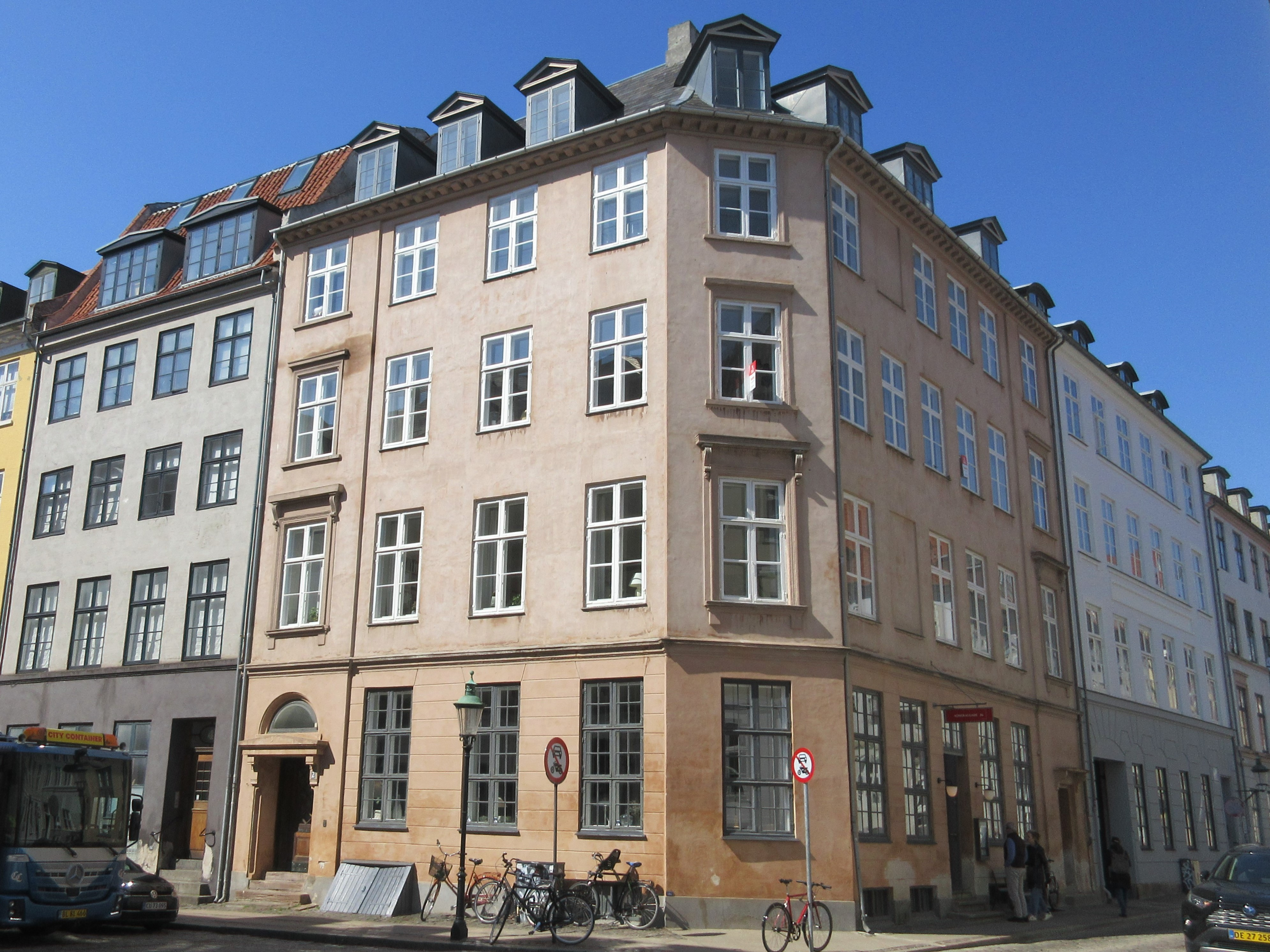
- The building seen from Boldhusgade
- Interactive map of the Boldhusgade 2 area

General information
- Architectural style: Neoclassical
- Location: Copenhagen, Denmark
- Coordinates: 55°40′39.18″N 12°34′55.49″E
- Construction started: 1795
- Completed: 1796

Boldhusgade 2/Admiralgade 26 is a Neoclassical apartment building situated at the corner of Boldhusgade and Admiralgade in the Old Town of Copenhagen, Denmark. The building, like most of the other buildings in the area, was constructed as part of the rebuilding of the city following the Copenhagen Fire of 1795. Notable former residents include the army officer Bernhard Ditlef von Staffeldt. The building was later home to first the restaurant and bar venue Admiral-Krien and then the experimental theatre Boldhus Teatret. The building was listed in the Danish registry of protected buildings and places in 1939.

== History ==
=== 17th century ===
A building referred to as the Old Arsenal (Gamle Tøjhus) or the Old Forge (Gamle Smedie) was located at the site from at least the middle of the 16th century. A document from 18 August 1602 mentions one Brønild (Lauridsen) as a resident of the "king's house" on the site. On 24 May 1606, the property was sold by the crown to skipper Niels Malmøe. By 1620, he had sold it to Ernst Pricker. Pricker would later travel to India and the property was sold in his absence by his wife to Rasmus Christensen. Upon Christensen's death, it was sold by his father Christen Rasmussen Fyrbøder to dyer Lucas Hammer. By 31 May 1652, the property belonged to Johan Michelsen. His heirs Öliger Paulli (bookkeeper in the Danish West India Company) and Rickert Johansen von Gendern sold their shares of the property to their brother-in-law Ditmer Buhrmester on 13 March 1682. Burmeister was most likely originally from Hamburg. He was a successful wholesale merchant who belonged to the circle around Poul Klingenberg. He also served as bookkeeper for the Danish East India Company. The property was later owned by his widow Johanna von Gendern. Her property was listed in Copenhagen's first cadastre of 1689 as No. 208 in Eastern Quarter. She was later married to merchant Jochum Würger.

=== 18th century ===
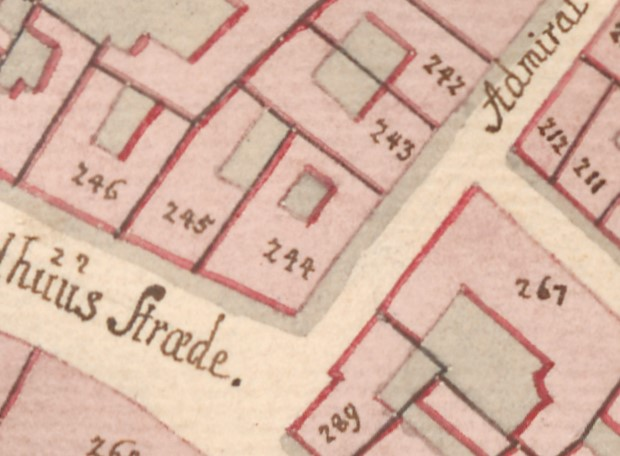
No. 244 seen on a detail from Christian Gedde's map of Eastern Quarter, 1757.

The property was after Johanna von Gendern's death in 1725 sold at auction to tailor Frantz Bouck. It was later acquired by wine retailer (vintapper) Peter Buchhalf. His property was listed in the new cadastre of 1756 as No. 244 in Eastern Quarter

The property was home to11 residents in two households at the 1787 census. Johan Friderich vom Passow, a court distiller, resided in the building with his wife Anna Dorothea Sørensen, his widowed sister-in-law Maren Stolpe (née Dreyer) and her 12-year-old son Nicolay Jørgen Stolpe, the wife's niece Helena Dreyer, one maid and three lodgers. Peter Larssen Nørregaard, a wine merchant, resided in the building with his wife Anna Kierstine Swastrup and one maid.

In 1793 Passow purchased the farm Friheden in Høsterkøb. Clas Fredrik Horn af Åminne, a Swedish count and army officer who had been exiled for his involvement in the assassination of King Gustav III of Sweden, became his tenant on the Friheden estate. Horn resided in a small building on the estate known as Ludvigsborg.

=== Schmidt and the new building ===
Passow sold his old property at the corner of Boldhusgade and Admiralgade to porcelain merchant Ulrich Schmidt. His property was not long thereafter destroyed in the Copenhagen Fire of 1795. The present building on the site was constructed for him in 1795–96. It was later passed to his son Wallerius Schmidt. He operated a restaurant in the building. The property was home to 13 residents at the time of the 1801 census. Schmidt resided in the building with his wife Hele Schmidt (née Alstrup), two sons from the wife's first marriage (Christian and Peder) and six maids.

The three last residents were three lodgers, army officer and chamberlain Bernhard Ditlef von Staffeldt and his wife Karen Herfordt, and her sister Dorthea Alstrup. Staffeldt headed the Norwegian Jæger Corps.

Schmidt's property was listed in the new cadastre of 1806 as No. 222 in Eastern Quarter.

=== Later history ===
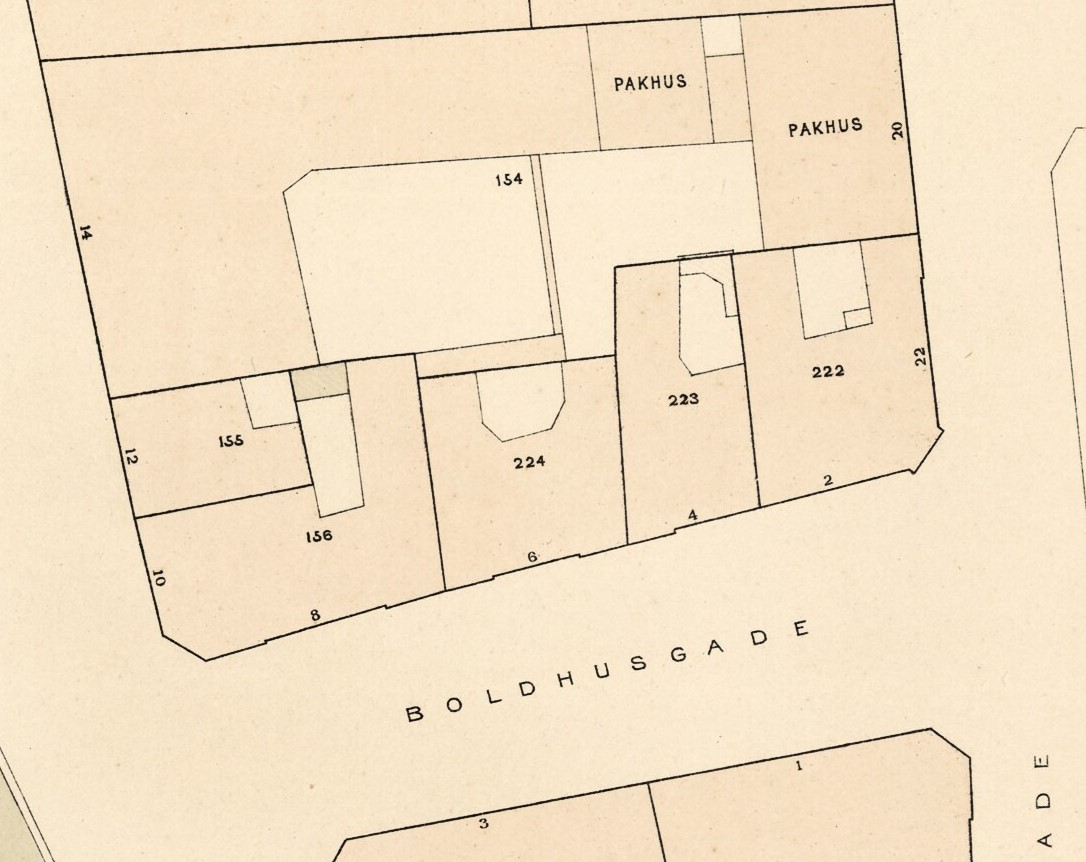
The property (right) seen on a detail from one of Berggreen's block plans of East Quarter, 1886-88.

The building underwent a one-storey vertical expansion in 1846.

The building was later converted into the three-storey Admiral Kroen, a bar and restaurant with function rooms on the upper floors. Admiral Kroen closed in 1964.

The ground floor of the building was subsequently converted into the theatre Boldhus Teatret at the initiative of Inger Rauf. Its early productions included the first Danish productions of Natalia Ginzburg's The Advertisement (directed by Sam Besekow) and Fernando Arrabal's And They Put Handcuffs on the Flowers (1970, directed by Klaus Hoffmeyer). Rauf established Strøghusteatret on Strøget in 1975 but returned to Boldhus Teatret in 1980. Later productions included T. Bernhard's Ritter, Dene, Voss and the first Danish production, Marguerite Duras’ Sommerregn. Raud headed the theatre until its closure in 2008.

H. Th. Neergaard, Byens Stempelfabrik, a company founded in 1901 by H. Th. Neergaard (died 1918), was headquartered in the building in 1950.

The first and second floors of the building were occupied by the nightclub El Toro Negro from 1965.

== Architecture ==
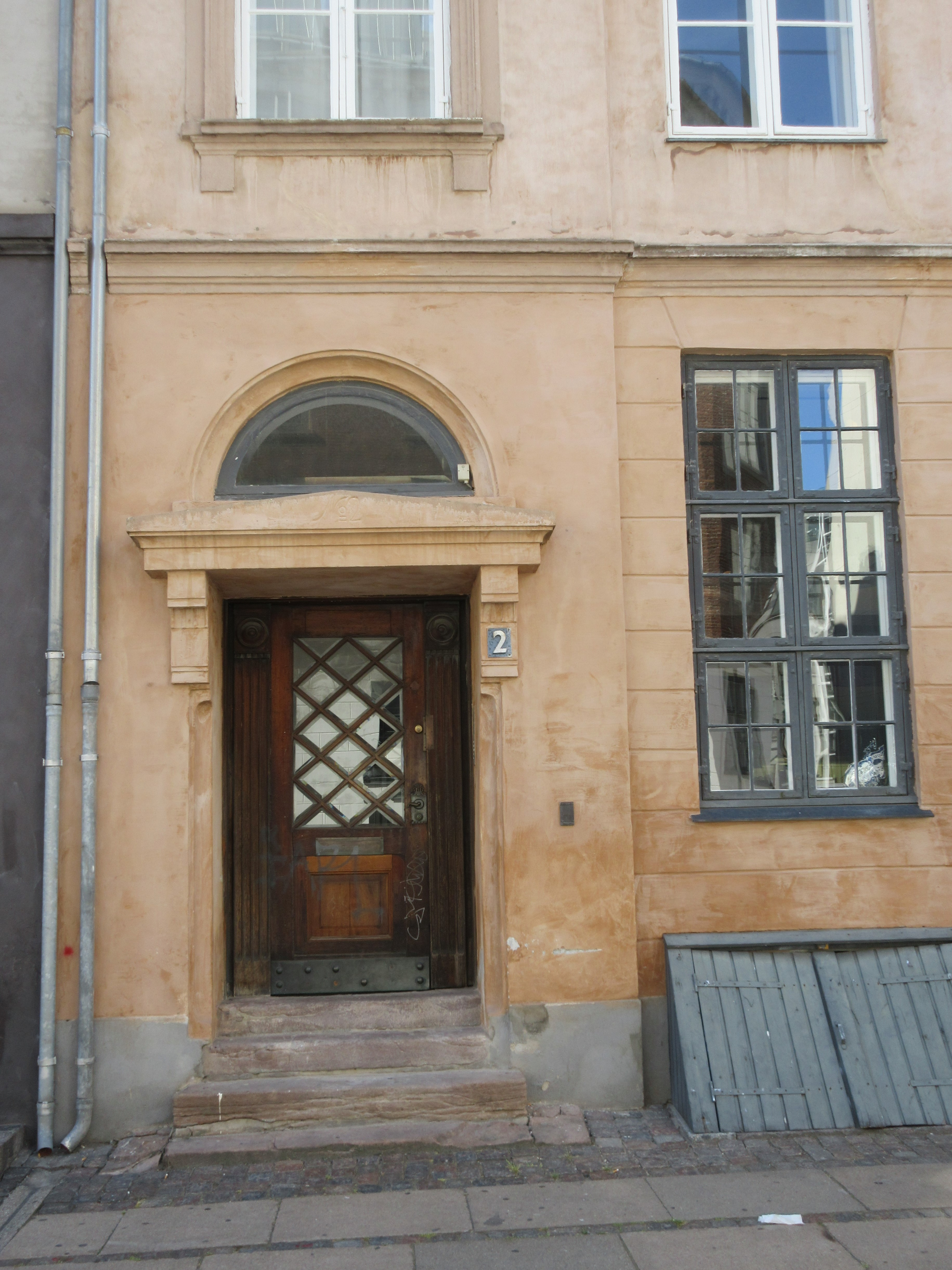
The main entrance in Boldhusgade.

Boldhusgade 2/Admiralgade 26 is constructed with four storeys over a walk-out basement. It has a four-bay-long facade towards Boldhusgade, a six-bay-long facade towards Admiralgade and a chamfered corner. The chamfered corner bay was dictated for all corner buildings by Jørgen Henrich Rawert's and Peter Meyn's guidelines for the rebuilding of the city after the fire so that the fire department's long ladder companies could navigate the streets more easily. The plastered facade features a cornice band above the ground floor and a modillioned cornice below the roof. The facade is finished with shadow joints on the ground floor and the exposed part of the basement towards both streets but not on the chamfered corner bay. The outer bay towards both streets and the corner bay project one quarter of a brick from the rest of the facade. The windows of these projections are accented with projecting sills and the first- and second-floor windows are furthermore accented with discrete hood moulds. The sill of the first-floor corner window is supported by corbels. The entrance in Boldhusgade is topped by a hood mould which is also supported by corbels. The roof of the building is clad in slate. The roof ridge is pierced by a chimney. A short side wing projects from the rear side of the building in Boldhusgade.

== Today ==
The building is owned by E/F Matr.nr. 222, Øster Kvt. A restaurant occupies the ground floor and basement of the building. A single condominium is located on each of the three upper floors.
