= Battle of Lier (1808) =

Battle of the 1808 Dano-Swedish War

Coordinates: 60°08′58″N 12°02′36″E

- Part of the Dano-Swedish War of 1808–1809 (Napoleonic Wars)
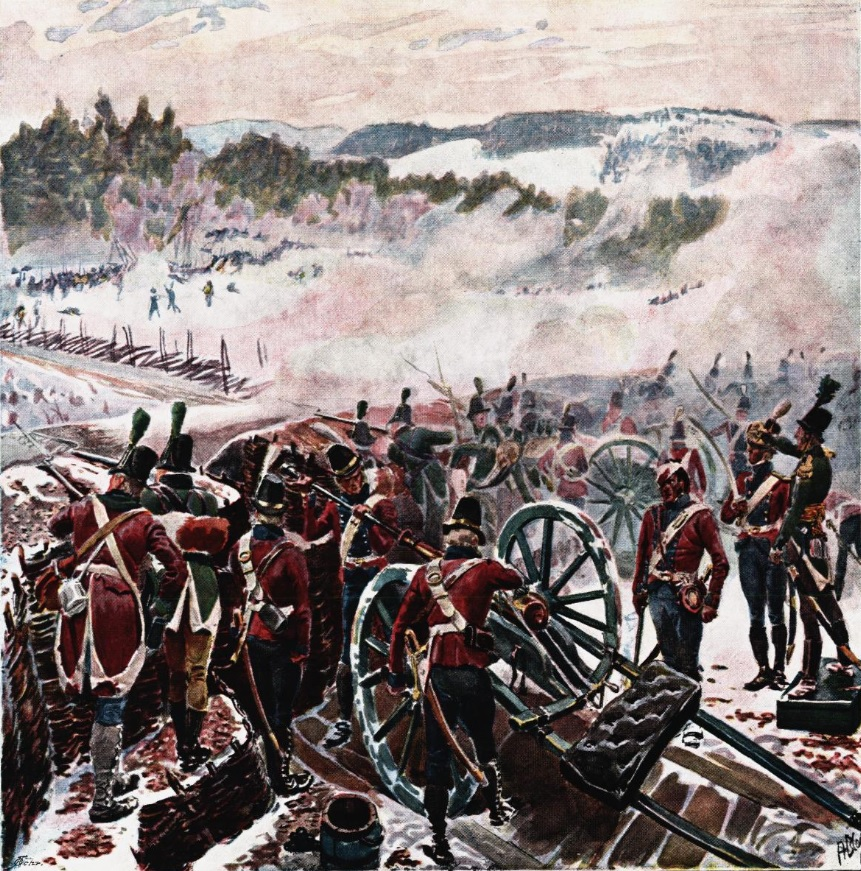
- Battle of Lier 1808, by Andreas Bloch
| Date | 18 April 1808 |
| Location | Lier, south of Kongsvinger, Norway |
| Result | Swedish victory |

Belligerents
| Sweden | Denmark–Norway |

Commanders and leaders
| (Sweden) Gustaf Mauritz Armfelt | (Denmark–Norway) Bernt Peter Kreutz |

Strength
| 1,250; 2 guns | 1,000; 8 guns |

Casualties and losses
| 71 | 150–200 |

The Battle of Lier was fought on 18 April 1808, between Swedish and Norwegian forces, during a Swedish invasion of Norway. The Swedes crossed the border in several brigades, of which the General-in-chief, Gustaf Mauritz Armfelt, followed the first; he arrived at the strong Norwegian position at the Lier entrenchment and decided to attack it, to reach Kongsvinger Fortress. Before launching the main attack, the Swedes made diversionary attacks on the flanks, of which the left one was particularly successful; Bernt Peter Kreutz, the Norwegian commander, reacted by shifting over troops to his threatened flank, which enabled the Swedes to capture his exposed right. Meanwhile, the Norwegian redoubt covering the road was likewise captured, as the Swedish main army swiftly attacked. Kreutz decided to retreat by the evening, fearing he would be cut off from the Kongsvinger fortress. Armfelt did not follow up his victory, instead remaining at Lier until late May, when he received orders to withdraw; the Swedes retreated out of Norway in May–June, after a fruitless campaign.

== Background ==
As a consequence of the Anglo-Danish War, Denmark–Norway formed an alliance with the French Empire in 1807. Since Napoleon was already at war with Sweden—which had resulted in the loss of Swedish Pomerania—and while the Swedes refused to enter the Continental System, Denmark–Norway declared war on 14 March 1808. On the behalf of Napoleon, the Russian Empire had likewise invaded Sweden on 21 February 1808; Sweden had thus been forced into a two-front war from the east and the west, while French and Danish forces threatened with an invasion in the south. In mid-April, the Swedish forces went on the counter-offensive with the goal of capturing Norway, as compensation for a potential loss of the eastern territorium (Finland).

The Swedes—who attacked successively in four brigades—had their second brigade crossing the border on the 14th, reaching the Glomma with no losses, after several skirmishes. The third and first brigades went across the following days, on the 15th and 16th, respectively. Gustaf Mauritz Armfelt, the Swedish General-in-chief, followed the first brigade of up to 2,000 men, led by Carl Henrik Anckarsvärd. It marched towards Kongsvinger in three columns, forcing the Norwegian troops to retreat along the way. Werner Nicolai de Seue, the commander of the Norwegian forces, had a total of between 1,700 and 2,400 men at his disposal towards Kongsvinger Fortress, including the garrison. On the 17th, the Swedish vanguard reached Lier, where the Norwegians had entrenched themselves in a very advantageous position which blocked the path to the fortress, 5 km (3 mi) to the north. Armfelt had about 1,400 men and three guns available for his attack on Lier, of which 1,250 men would be engaged. The Norwegians had 1,000–1,200 men at Lier (including a landwehr), with four 3-pounder and four 1-pounder guns, under Bernt Peter Kreutz. Seue, with 450 additional troops, stood as reserve further north, near the fortress, but these would not be engaged.

== Battle ==
The Norwegian formation stretched about 900 m (2,953 ft) over the heights, with its right (west) protected by the Føsker, and the left (east) by the Tarven and Vinger lakes. The Lier homesteads made up the centre, south of which a 300–400 m (984–1,312 ft) wide swampy meadow stretched, which turned into impassable boglands further west; additional heights arose behind the meadow, covered in a coniferous forest, which could only be traversed after certain difficulty. The Norwegians had, furthermore, established a vital redoubt a few hundred metres south of their left wing, to observe the main road.

=== Diversionary attacks ===
On the morning of the 18th, Armfelt attacked; he ordered two divisions to sweep around and make diversionary attacks on the Norwegian flanks, while his centre prepared to frontally assault. At 08:30, the left Swedish division of 200 men (mainly from the Värmland Jäger Battalion), under Matern, drove back the Norwegian light infantry south of the entrenchments, towards the direction of the redoubt. Matern then advanced over the frozen Føsker to a height, 100 metres from the Norwegian right, where he began skirmishing, accordingly. He withdrew after a while, to await the main Swedish attack—the deep snow slowed down the movements. Cederström, with the right Swedish division of near 600 men (mainly from the Närke-Värmland Regiment), found his way impassable; upon receiving his reports, Armfelt instead ordered 100 Jägers under Lilljeström and Belfrage to make the diversion on the Norwegian left, while the Swedish centre (about 350 men) set march through the forest, around 15:00, to attack.

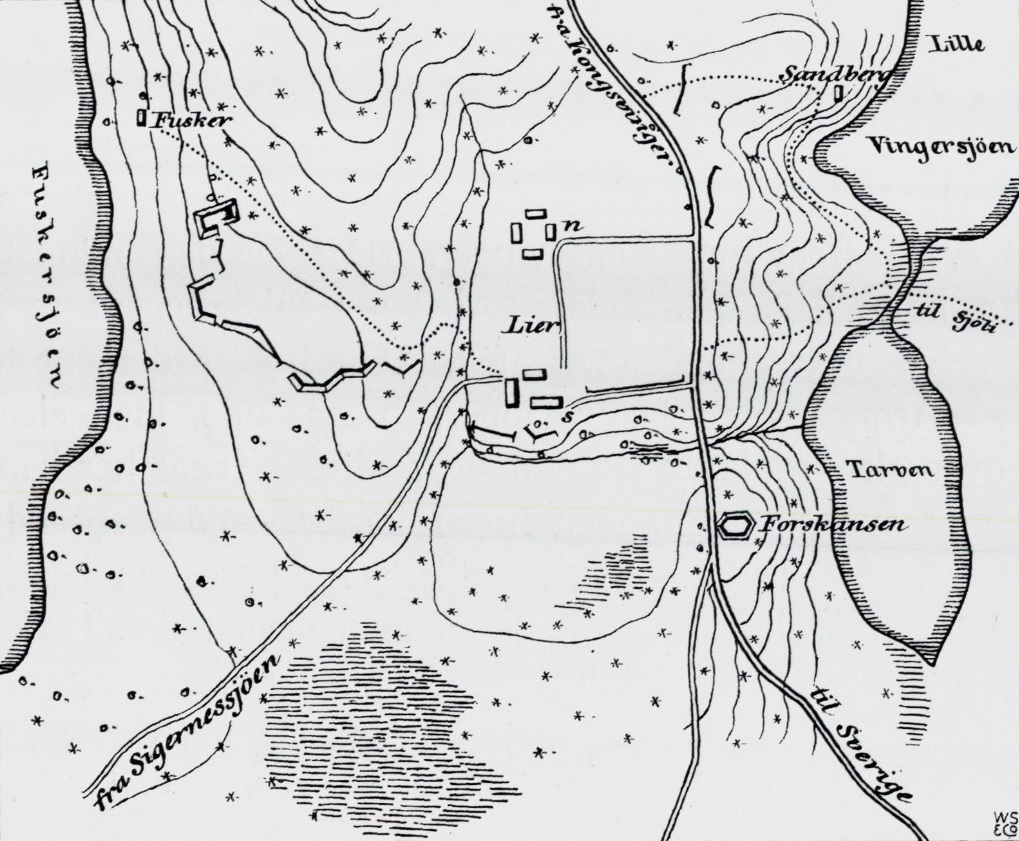
Norwegian position in the centre, between the three lakes. Swedish forces came from the south-east. By Henrik Angell

=== Swedish assault ===
A little past 17:00, the Swedes, with two guns in support, captured the heights left of the road, after which an intense firefight commenced. The Swedish infantry positioned itself in front of the forest and prepared to storm the redoubt. However, Lilljeström's attack over Tarven had failed while Belfrage had been repelled east of the redoubt, which convinced Armfelt to cancel a continued assault and order a retreat. Meanwhile, Cederström suddenly arrived with his division and threatened to go over the river between the two lakes, on the Norwegian flank. This resulted in a large shift of troops from the Norwegian right wing, to their left; a failed Norwegian counterattack against Cederström followed (mainly by the Oppland Grenadier Regiment), with many losses as a result. Near 18:00, as the Norwegians could be seen shifting their troops, the Uppland Regiment, under major Hård, seized the initiative and stormed the redoubt under the cover of a gun—it was taken after a hard-fought melee. The Norwegian right, which was almost completely stripped from troops (apart from some landwehr), was simultaneously taken in a renewed attack by Matern; he then seized the heights west of the Lier homesteads, which endangered the whole Norwegian position. Instead of conducting a counterattack, Keutz ordered a full retreat around 19:00, as he also feared being cut off from Kongsvinger. Seue had denied him the support from the reserve, as he was afraid that Cederström would fall upon the fortress. Armfelt pursued the Norwegians all the way to Tråstad, under frequent skirmishing, after which Keutz made it over the frozen Glommen towards Kongsvinger.

== Aftermath ==
The Swedes had five men killed and 66 wounded (an additional 17 had suffered contusion). The Norwegians had 95 men captured (apart from some armed peasants), 54 killed, and an unknown number of wounded (two confirmed); or around 100 killed and wounded in total, and near the same number of captured. Armfelt did not follow up on his victory, as he deemed that his artillery was too weak to besiege the Kongsvinger fortress. The old Norwegian entrenchments were destroyed and replaced by new ones, facing north. Swedish outposts were sent to the Glommen, while the main army remained at Lier. In his after action report, Armfelt wrote: "This position is so strong that I would never have resolved to attack it with such an insignificant force, had it been revealed to me earlier". Armfelt planned to use Lier as a forward operating base, as soon as the ice would break up at the Glomma. The news of the important Swedish victory was quickly neglected, however, as isolated Swedish contingents were overwhelmed, at both Toverud and Trangen, the following days. On 24 May, six days after the Battle of Mobekk, Armfelt received orders from Gustav IV Adolf to act defensively, as the king planned an attack on Denmark. As a result, Armfelt retreated out of Norway with most of the army in May and June.

== Citations and sources ==
=== Sources ===
- Generalstaben (1915). Sveriges krig åren 1808 och 1809, Volume 6 (in Swedish). Stockholm: Kongl. boktryckeriet P. A. Norstedt & söner.
- Angell, Henrik (1914). Syv-Aars-Krigen for 17. Mai 1807–1814 (in Norwegian). Kristiania: H. Aschehoug & Co.
- Sundberg, Ulf (2010). Sveriges krig: 1630–1814; del 3 (in Swedish). Stockholm: Svenskt militärhistoriskt bibliotek. ISBN 9789185789634.
- Tegnér, Elof (1884). Gustaf Mauritz Armfelt: Efter Armfelts efterlemnade papper samt andra handskrifna och tryckta källor (second edition); volume 3 (in Swedish). Stockholm: F. & G. Beijers Förlag.
