= Birkerød Church =

Coordinates: 55°50′27″N 12°25′47″E

- Birkerød Kirke
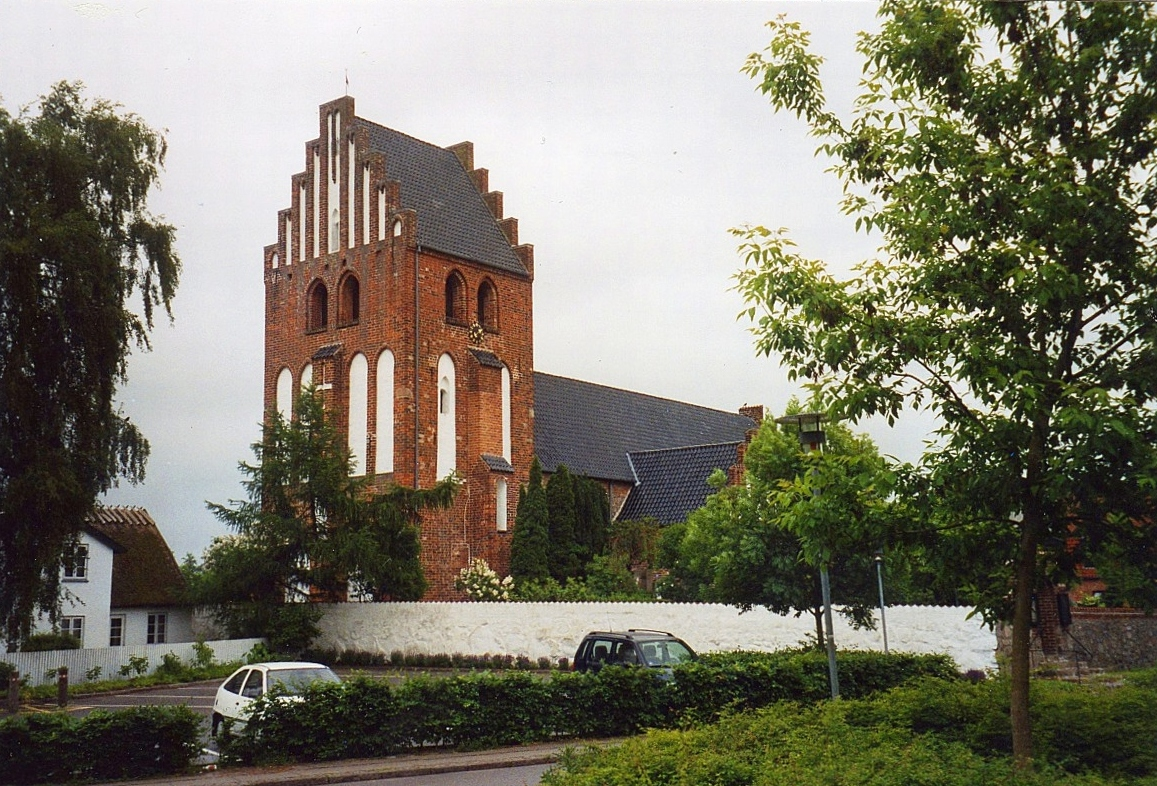
- Birkerød Church
- Location: Birkerød
- Country: Denmark
- Denomination: Church of Denmark

Architecture
- Completed: 12th century

Administration
- Diocese: Diocese of Helsingør
- Deanery: Rudersdal Provsti
- Parish: Birkerød Sogn

Birkerød Church (Danish: Birkerød Kirke) is a church at Birkerød, Rudersdal Municipality, Greater Copenhagen, Denmark. It is one of two churches in the parish of Birkerød, the other being Høsterkøb Church in Høsterkøb which dates to 1908. Birkerød Church is particularly noted for its Gothic frescoes (kalkmalerier).

== History ==
The church dates from the 12th century but has later undergone numerous changes. The nave and chancel of Birkerød Church were built in stone in the middle of the 12th century. A north chapel built in mixed field stone and brick was added in the beginning of the 13th century. The remains of it can still be seen in the wall between the sacristy and north chapel. The nave was at this point also lengthened westwards to its current length.

Construction of the tower began in circa 1475. A new chancel also replaced the old one at this point. The porch was built around 1525 and the current north chapel was built in 1563. The windows has been moved and altered several times but remains of the original 12th-century windows can still be seen.

Henrik Gerner was appointed as parish priest for Birkerød in 1656. In 1731, Gerhard Hermansen Treschow was appointed as parish priest by queen Sophie Magdalene. In 1876 he left the office when he was appointed as pastor of Trinitatis Church in Copenhagen.

== Furnishings ==
The altarpiece dates from the late 15th century and was probably imported from North Germany. It was restored in 1899 and reinstalled in the church as a replacement for a later altarpiece painted by Gustav Theodor Wegener (1817–1877) which can now be seen in the north chapel. The pulpit is from circa 1600 and features King Christian IV's monogram. The five arched niches feature Christ and the four apostles.

The font is made of sandstone and was created in 1944 by sculptor Axel Poulsen (1887–1972).

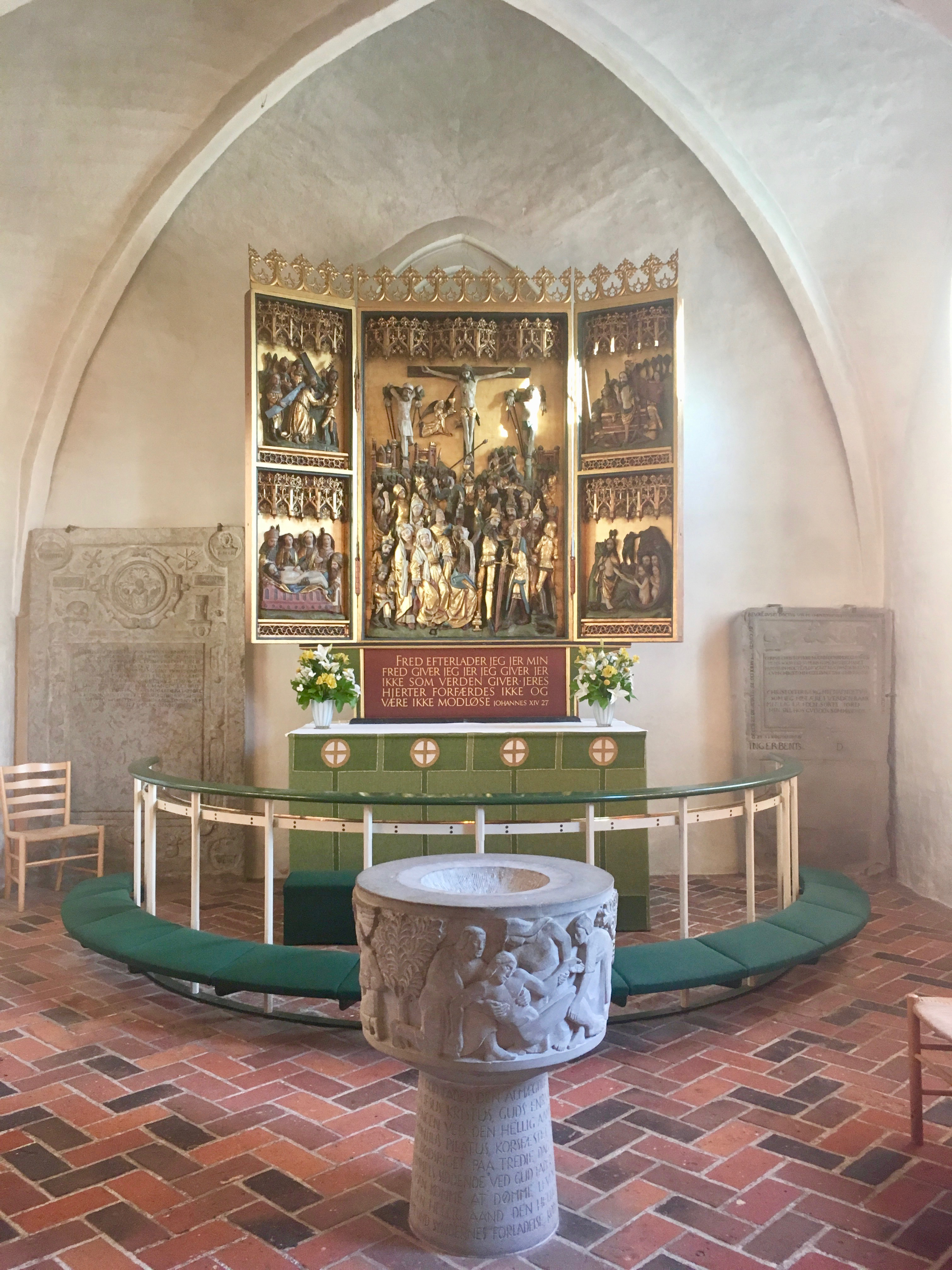
Birkerød Church altar

On the wall to the west of the pulpit is a painting of Henrik Gerner (1629-1700) who was parish priest of Birkerød in 1657-85. In 1659, he was arrested for plotting against the Swedish occupants at Kronborg Castle. He returned to Birkerød and later became bishop of the Diocese of Viborg. The painting is a copy from 1826 of the original by Flemish painter Karl van Mander (1548–1606) in the Museum of National History at Frederiksborg Castle. On the railing in front of the organ are six paintings from the middle of the 17th century.

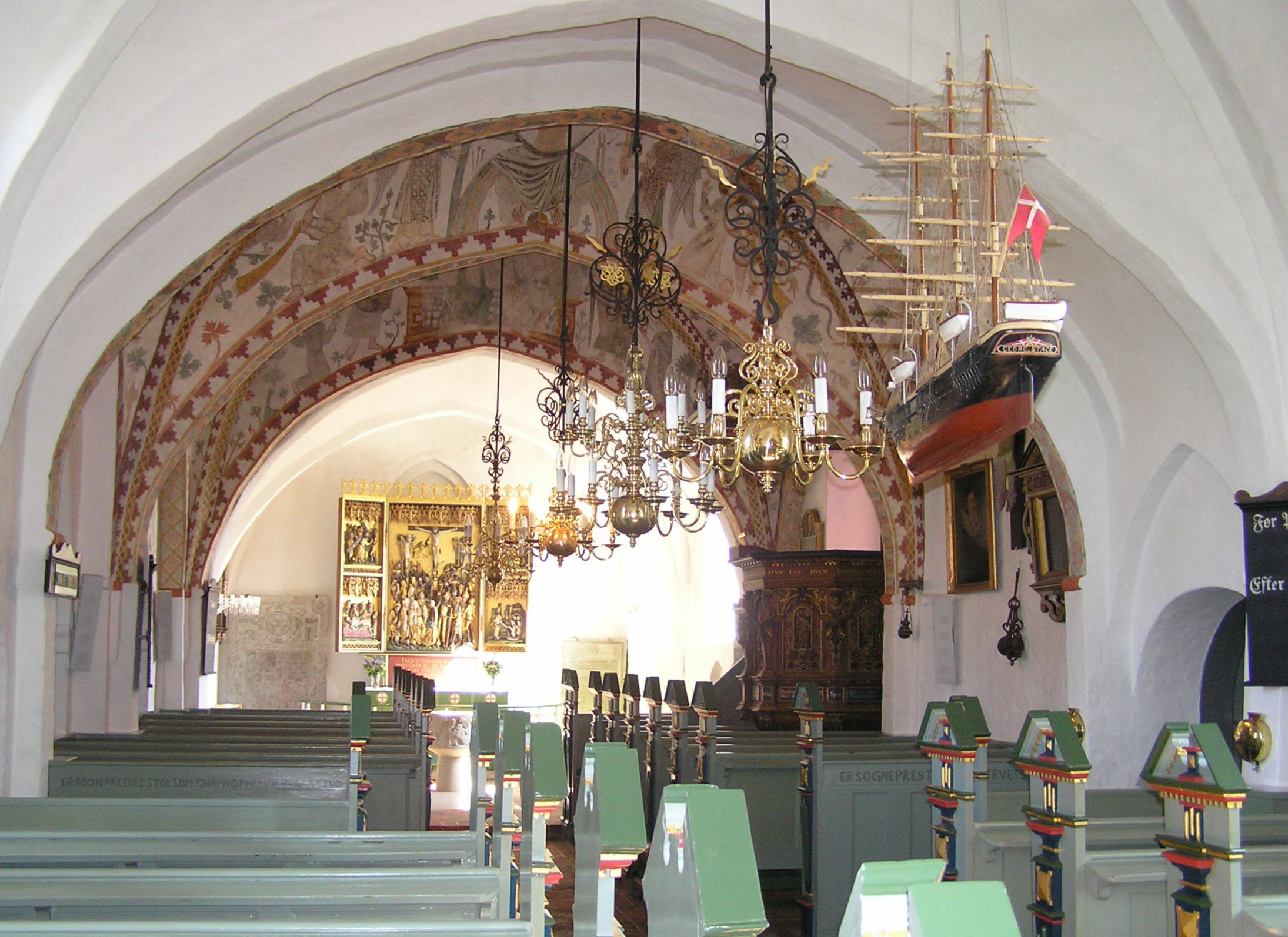
Birkerød Church interior

== Churchyard ==
The church is surrounded by a churchyard. It is now supplemented by Birkerød Assistens Cemetery (Søholm Cemetery). Notable burials in the churchyard include:

- Johan Ulrik Bredsdorff (1845-1928), oaubter
- Majsa Bredsdorff
- Aage Bretting, engineer
- Erik Koch Larsen, journalist
- Gustav Kähler, businessman
- Vilhelm la Cour, painter
- Søren Peter Larsen, politician
- Tage Stentoft, painter
- Carl Wennemoes, painter

== Cultural references ==
Birkerød Church has been used as a location in the feature films Det gælder livet (1953) and En kort, en lang (2001).
