= Staffeldt =

Staffeldt is a surname. Notable people with the surname include:

- Bernhard Ditlef von Staffeldt (1753–1818), Norwegian military officier
- Schack von Staffeldt (1769–1826), Danish author
- Timo Staffeldt (born 1984), German footballer
