= Battle of Trangen =

Battle of the Dano-Swedish War of 1808–1809

- Part of the Dano-Swedish War of 1808–1809
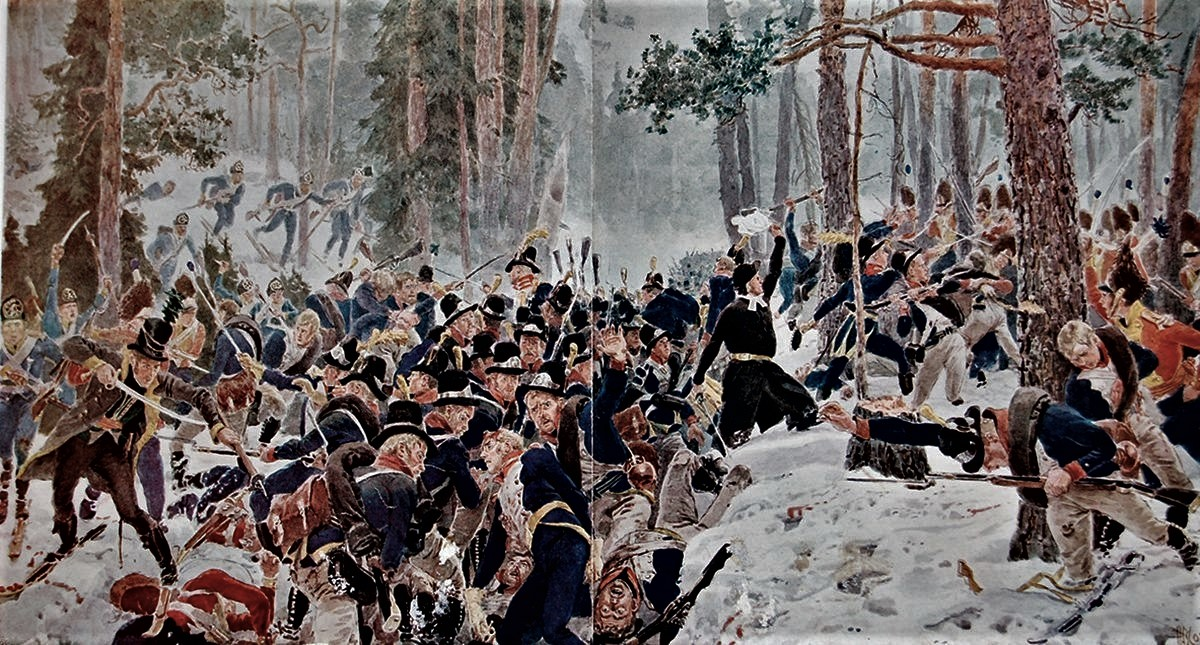
- Surrounded Swedish forces, by Andreas Bloch
Date	25 April 1808
Location	Trangen, Flisa, Norway 60°36′37″N 11°58′34″E
Result	Dano-Norwegian victory

Belligerents
Sweden	Denmark–Norway

Commanders and leaders
Carl Pontus Gahn (POW)	(Denmark–Norway) Bernhard Ditlef von Staffeldt

Strength
531	1,050

Casualties and losses
25 killed 57 wounded 433 captured	15 killed 52 wounded 2 captured

The Battle of Trangen took place on 25 April 1808 at Trangen in Flisa, Hedemarkens Amt, between Swedish and Norwegian troops, as a part of the Dano-Swedish War of 1808–1809. The invading Swedish troops, led by Colonel Carl Pontus Gahn, were surrounded and forced to surrender by the Norwegian troops under the command of Bernhard Ditlef von Staffeldt. Gahn and around 450 of his troops were captured.

== Background ==
After the Swedish setback at Skabukilen on 13 April, they were victorious at Lier on 18 April, when they drove the Norwegians back to Kongsvinger Fortress. General Gustaf Mauritz Armfelt, now headquartered at Lier, hoped to take the strategically important fortress through a pincer movement with the help of Gahn's "Flying Corps". The plan was that Gahn should advance with his troops across the border from Midtskog and on to Åsnes, and from there march south along the river Glomma to Kongsvinger.

=== The Swedish advance ===
On the evening of 24 April Gahn crossed the Swedish-Norwegian border with the 2nd battalion of the Dalarna Regiment, and moved westwards, along the southern side of Flisa River. He chose to march at night to surprise the Norwegian outposts. At dawn, the battalion was near the Flisa River, where it faced the first Norwegian outposts, who immediately fired warning shots and sent out a report about the Swedish advance.

=== The Norwegian defenders ===
The defending troops, commanded by Colonel Bernhard Ditlef von Staffeldt, had begun establishing a defense in the area in early April 1808. Staffeldt's brigade consisted of a grenadier battalion of the 2nd Trondheim Infantry Regiment (2. Throndhjemske Infanteriregiments grenaderbataljon) commanded by Major Johan Georg Ræder, the Southern Norwegian Ski Battalion (Den søndenfjeldske Skiløberbataljon) commanded by Major Frederik Wilhelm Stabell, the Lærdal Light Infantry Company (Lærdalske lette infanterikompani) commanded by Captain Wilhelm Jürgensen, and some troops from Oppland Dragoon Regiment (Oplandske Dragonregiment).

Staffeldt, unsure of the Swedish plans, hesitated to give the order to attack. He found it highly unusual that the Swedes marched into Trangen, a narrow pass between the cliffs of Kjelsås and Buttenås, without sending troops forward along the main road on the north side of the river, and therefore feared that it was a trap. He nevertheless sent 270 men under the command of Captain Elias Nægler to the defensive position at Trangen, which had been prepared with roadblocks of trees, and where it was likely that the Swedish troops would pass.

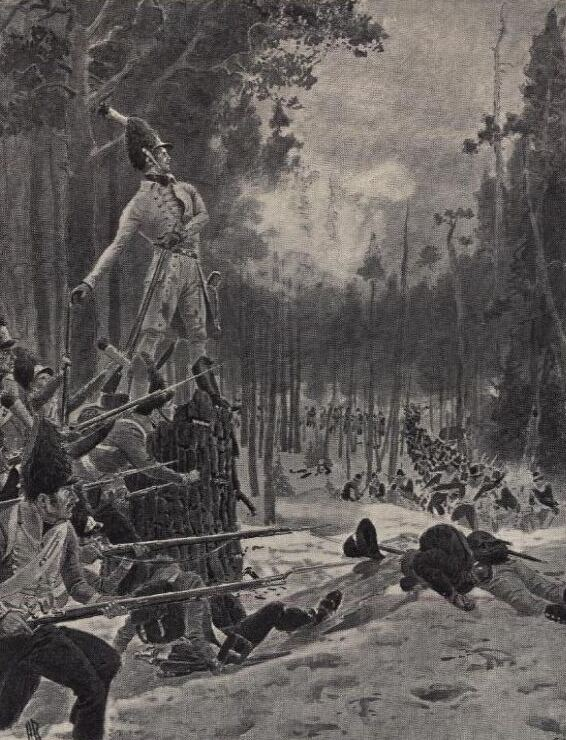
Captain Nicolay Peter Drejer on the stump during the battle

== Battle ==
When the vanguard of Colonel Gahn's column later in the day reached Captain Nægler's companies in the Trangen pass they immediately attacked, and the attack was so heavy that Nægler had to call for reinforcements. But after about an hour of fighting it still looked as if the Swedish troops were about to break through the Norwegian defensive lines at the Trangen pass. While this was going on, Colonel Staffeldt brought the main force eastward from Sønsterud towards Nyen which was the sharpshooter division's main position, to block the crossing north of the river Flisa. When the Colonel and his staff arrived at Nyen, they could see the Swedish units advancing westwards towards Trangen on the south side of the river. Staffeldt then decided to send patrols further east, in the direction of the border to check if more Swedish troops were on their way. Major Stabell and Ræder tried to persuade him to immediately attack the Swedes from the rear, claiming that if he did not do this, the battle would be lost. But it was not until reconnaissance showed that no more Swedish troops were on the way, that Staffeldt was persuaded to attack.

The attack was carried out by 500 men under the command of Major Ræder, consisting of a ski company, sharpshooters and grenadiers who crossed the frozen river and attacked the Swedish rearguard at Gammelseter. From Gammelseter the advancing Norwegians quickly drove the Swedish rearguard consisting of 40 men against the main force, and Gahn realized that there was a large force attacking the column from the rear, threatening to encircle them. He therefore chose to stop his attacks against the defensive position at Trangen and turn the whole battalion around to face the attackers. He ordered the forces about to break through Captain Nægler's lines to fall back in order to regroup with the rest of the battalion. On a hill between Trangen and Gammelseter the two armies met, and the Swedish forces managed to drive the Norwegians back. Twice Major Ræder and his officers managed to turn the wavering Norwegians, and it was during this phase of the battle that the Norwegian Captain Nicolay Peter Drejer distinguished himself when he climbed up on a pine stump and commanded his troops while shooting at the Swedes. He was able to fire almost continuously against the enemy since two grenadiers helped him reload his weapons, and the heroic act helped to increase the morale among the Norwegian soldiers. But on the stump, Captain Drejer was an easy target for the Swedish soldiers and after being shot 7 times, he collapsed, badly wounded. Gahn's troops, after repeated attempts, managed to drive the Norwegian troops back, but they failed to break through, and thus had no opportunity to retreat along the same path that they had arrived.

From Trangen, Captain Nægler could hear the sound of the heavy fighting east of them, and he choose to take his grenadiers and march quickly in the direction the Swedes had retreated. Nægler's force quickly encountered and attacked Gahn's rear guard, something that worsened the situation for the Swedes since Gahn now had to form a front against the two sides. Deep snow on both sides of the road also weakened Gahn's ability to maneuver considerably. When Norwegian ski troops also began their attack on the Swedish flanks the Swedes where almost completely encircled. Colonel Gahn tried to ask for negotiations, but was not heard through all the commotion. The encircled Swedish troops surrendered when most of their ammunition was spent, and the whole force was captured (with the exception of a few soldiers who escaped through the woods). When the outcome of the battle at Trangen was clear, Staffeldt sent troops under the command of Captain Nægler towards Midtskog in Sweden. There the remaining Swedish troops, a detachment led by Major Söderhjelm, were captured.

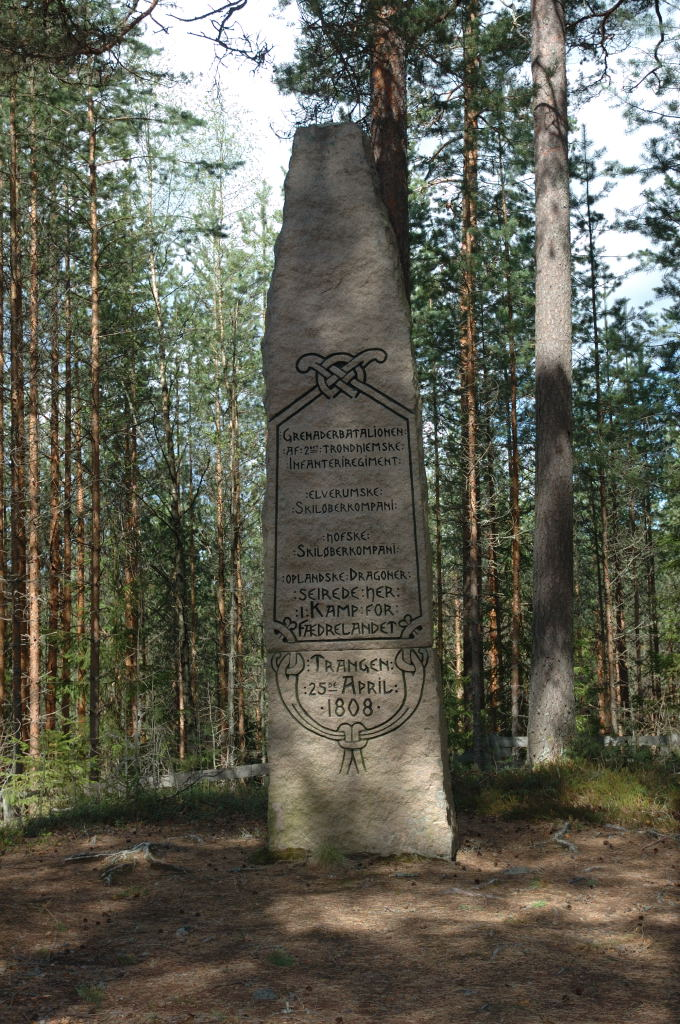
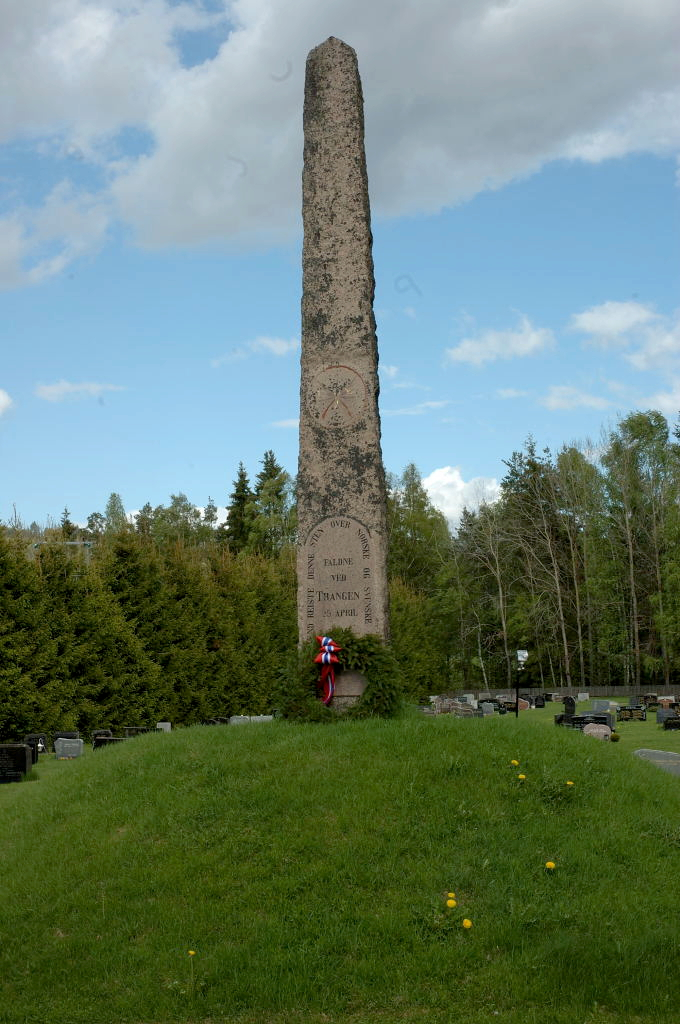
Memorials of the fighting at Trangen at the battlefield (left) and at Åsnes Church

== Aftermath ==
After the battle, the captured officers, including Colonel Carl Pontus Gahn, were taken to Bjørneby where the Norwegian field hospital was located. This field hospital was also quickly filled up by several wounded Swedish and Norwegian soldiers. The remaining Swedish prisoners who were not wounded were marched to Åsnes church, before they later were sent on to Drammen and Lier in Buskeruds Amt. The severely injured Captain Nicolay Peter Drejer was brought to Sønsterud Farm in Gjesåsen after the battle. There he died four days later from the injuries.

Colonel Gahn's thrust against Kongsvinger Fortress came to be the last offensive maneuver the Swedes carried out south in Hedmark until they withdrew back to Sweden in late May. So, although the battle of Trangen posed no decisive factor for the war itself, the battle would stabilize the situation in the front north and south-west of Kongsvinger. Gahn's surrender had removed the threat of a Swedish pincer movement against Kongsvinger from the north, as well as the Norwegian victory now allowed Colonel von Staffeldt to concentrate his forces against General Armfeldt's forces south-east of the fortress.

== Legacy ==
The battle of Trangen has been a source of legendary stories, and a national symbol in Norway. In retrospect, and especially during the Norwegian romantic nationalism in the late 19th century, emphasis was placed on Nicolay Peter Drejer's courageous efforts and he was given much of the credit for the victory at Trangen. The stump Captain Drejer used during the battle was later named after him (Norwegian: Drejerstubben), and the remains of the stump is still visible today.

A memorial of the battle is raised at the site, and a memorial of the fallen Swedish and Norwegian soldiers is raised at Åsnes Church.

In connection with the 200th anniversary of the battle in 2008, a re-enactment was held. The event was attended by King Harald V, who also visited Sønsterud Farm and the room where Captain Drejer had died, which had been restored for the anniversary.

== Bibliography ==
- Angell, Henrik (1914). Syv-aars-krigen for 17. mai 1807–1814 (in Norwegian). Kristiania: Aschehoug. ISBN 82-90520-23-9.
- Angell, Henrik (1901). Kaptein Jürgensen og Leirdølerne hans. Kristiania: Aschehoug.
- Ersland, Geir Atle; Holm, Terje H (2000). Krigsmakt og kongemakt 900–1814. Norsk forsvarshistorie (in Norwegian). Vol. 1. Bergen: Eide Forlag. ISBN 82-514-0558-0.
- Evensen, Knut Harald, ed. (2010). Naf Veibok 2010–2012 (in Norwegian). Oslo: Norwegian Automobile Federation.
- Rastad, Per-Erik; Engh, Bjørn; Engen, Jorunn (2004). Sju dramatiske år – ufredstid i Glomdalsdistriktet, 1807–1814 (in Norwegian). Kongsvinger: Kongsvinger Festnings venner.
- Schnitler, Didrik (1895). Blade af Norges krigshistorie (in Norwegian). Kristiania: Aschehoug.
- Philström, Anton; Westerlund, Carl (1911). Kungl. Dalregementets Historia. 5:te Afdelningen (in Swedish). Stockholm: Kungl. Boktryckeriet. P. A. Norstedt & Söner.
