= Høsterkøb Church =

Church building in Rudersdal Municipality, Denmark

Coordinates: 55.8514°N 12.4891°E

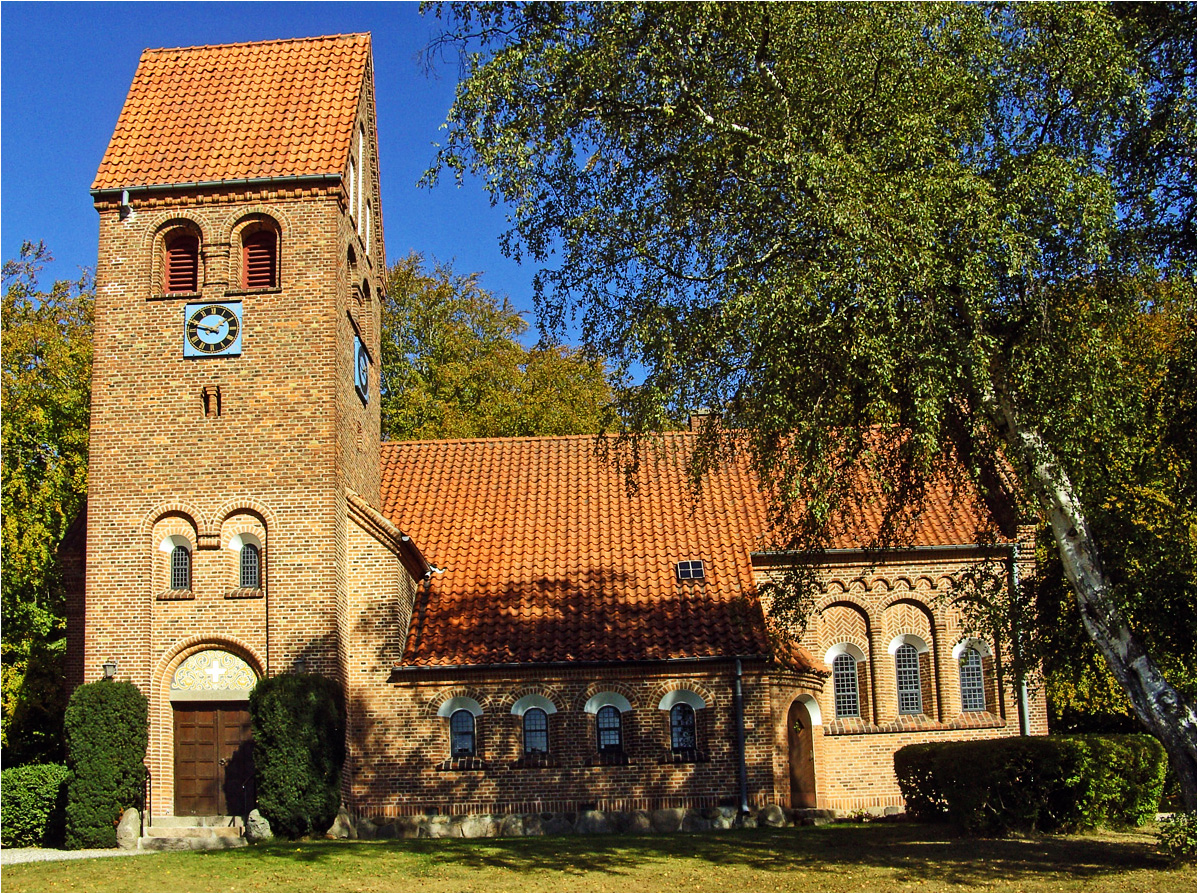
Høsterkøb Church

Høsterkøb Church (Danish: Høsterkøb Kirke) is a parish church in the village of Høsterkøb, Rudersdal Municipality, some 20 km north of central Copenhagen, Denmark.

== History ==
Construction began in 1907 and it was inaugurated on 5 June 1907.

== Architecture ==
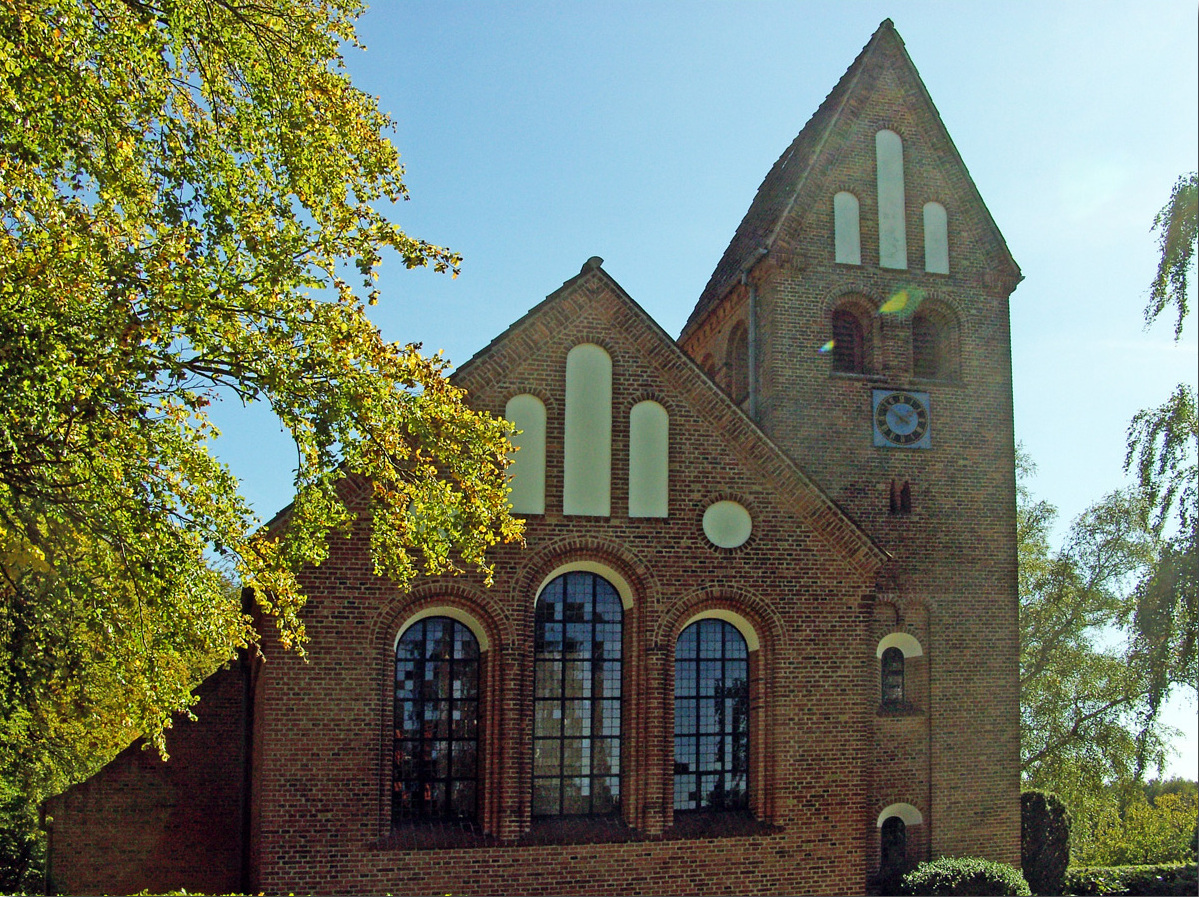
Høsterkøb Church viewed from the west

Høsterkøb Church was designed by the Danish architect Ulrik Plesner. The church is built of small red bricks with white plaster ornamentation. The tower is placed on the south side of the nave. Some of the decorations were designed by the Danish architect and ornamental artist Thorvald Bindesbøll.

== Interior and furnishings ==
The altarpiece is from 1599 and is originally from Birkerød Church. The upper part of the font is made of granite and is originally from Lynge Church; the base dates from 1907. The pulpit is built of brick and is located in the southeastern corner of the church. It is decorated with plastered leaf ornamentation. The organ is from 1972 and was built by Th. Frobenius & Sønner in Kongens Lyngby.

== Churchyard ==
The churchyard was not inaugurated until 1933. It is a woodland cemetery and fencing the individual graves is not permitted. Notable burials include:

- Finn Birger Christensen (1927–2004),
- Karl-Otto Hedal (1921–2006), painter
- Gerda Janson (1920–2008), politician and resistance fighter
- Ea Koch (1905–1987), weaver
- Mogens Koch (1898–1992), architect and designer
- Erik Lund (1902-1992), historian and resistance fighter
- Torben Valeur (1920–2001), architect
