= Nicolay Peter Drejer =

Norwegian military officer (1773–1808)

Nicolay Peter Dreyer
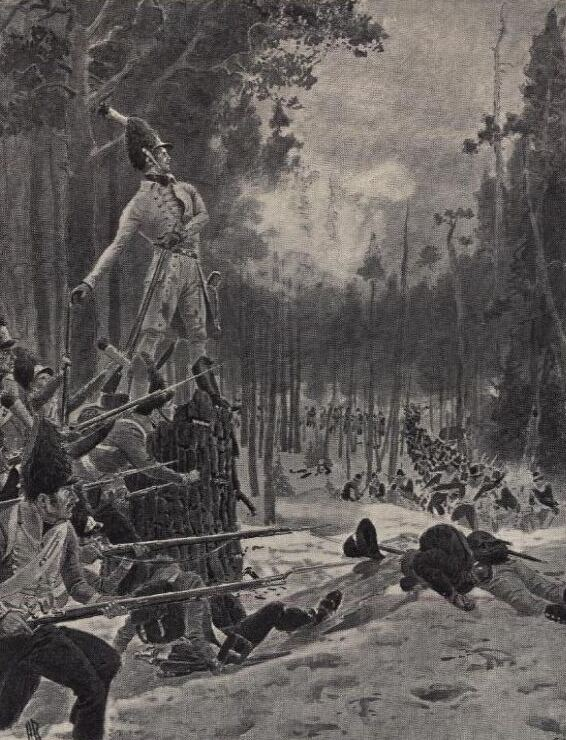
- Drejer on the tree stump
- Born: 21 March 1773; Fosnes, Norway
- Died: 29 April 1808 (aged 35); Sønsterud farm, Gjesåsen, Norway
- Military career
- Allegiance: Denmark–Norway
- Rank: Captain
- Conflicts: Dano-Swedish War of 1808–1809; Battle of Trangen (DOW)

Nicolay Peter Dreyer (21 March 1773 – 29 April 1808) was a Norwegian military officer with the rank of captain. He was born in Fosnes. He became a legend during the Battle of Trangen on 25 April 1808, leading his infantry regiment first from a roof, then from a tree stump with the height of a man. The stump was later named after him (Norwegian: Drejerstubben), a series of myths developed after his death, and he became a national symbol in 1814 and in 1905.
