= Skinnarbøl =

Rich Manor House and Estate

Coordinates: 60.1827°N 12.0768°E

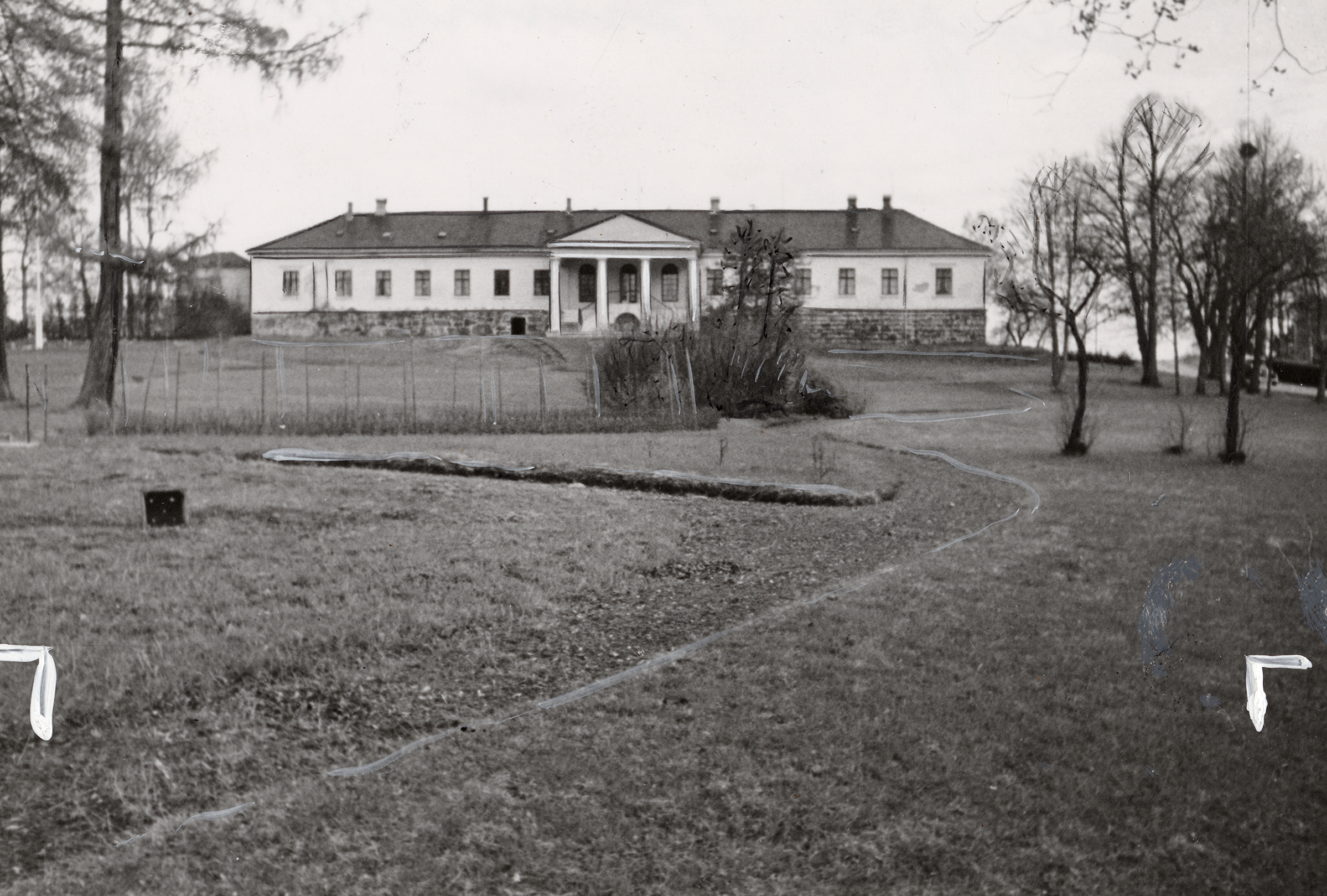
Skinnarbøl

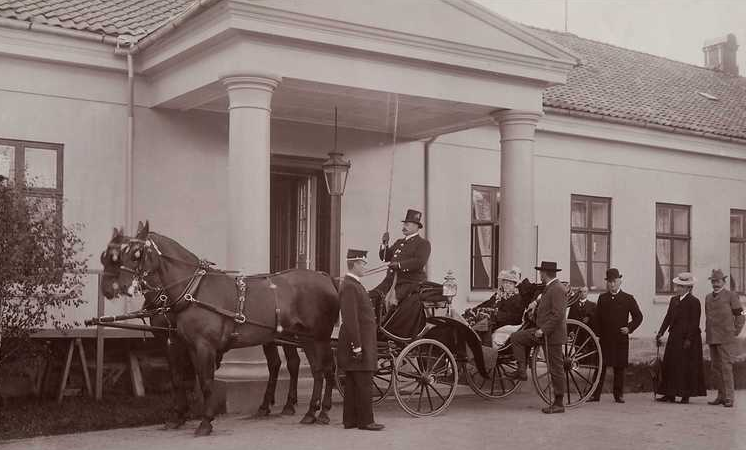
Queen Sophia arrives at Skinnarbøl

Skinnarbøl is a manor house and estate in Kongsvinger Municipality in Innlandet ounty, Norway. It is located east of the city of Kongsvinger and east of the lake Vingersjøen, just north of the European route E16.

== History ==
Close to the Swedish border and Finnskogen, the estate lands have historically belonged to several families including the Swedish noble families Natt och Dag and Oxenstierna. The estate manor house, often referred to as Grenseslottet (lit. 'The Border Palace'), was completed in 1849 and is decorated in Empire style.

The manor was frequently used by King Oscar II and his wife Queen Sophia between 1892 and 1905. Queen Sophia's poor health often required her to use a wheelchair and she became particularly fond of the estate, as the manor house only had a single floor and large doorways. The Queen therefore often preferred spending her time in Norway at Skinnarbøl, while King Oscar would reside more at the Royal Palace in Oslo. The manor is today legally protected by Riksantikvaren.
