= Enningdalsälven =

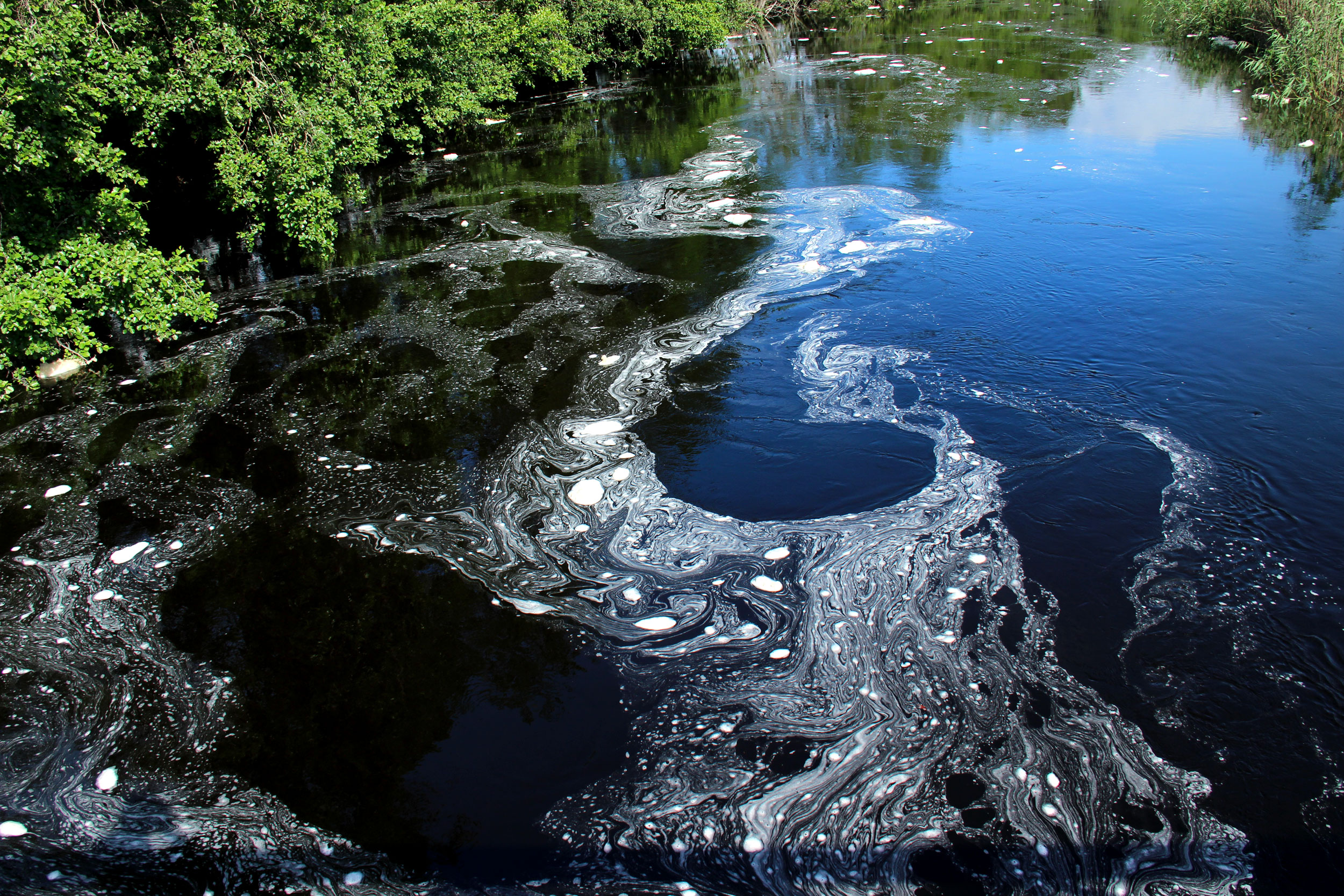

Location
- Country: Sweden, Norway

Physical characteristics
- Source: Bullaresjöarna
  - coordinates: 58°52′40″N 11°32′15″E
- Mouth: Iddefjord
  - coordinates: 58°58′50″N 11°28′30″E
- Basin size: 781.7 km^{2} (301.8 sq mi)

Enningdalsälven is a river in Sweden and Norway.
