= Bernhard Ditlef von Staffeldt =

- Born: Dethloff Berend von Staffeldt; 23 October 1753; Swedish Pomerania
- Died: 11 January 1818 (aged 64); Hedrum, Norway
- Military career
- Allegiance: Denmark–Norway; Norway
- Branch: Army
- Service years: 1770–1814
- Rank: Lieutenant general
- Conflicts: Theatre War; Battle of Kvistrum Bridge; Dano-Swedish War (1808–1809); Battle of Trangen; Battle of Mobekk; Swedish–Norwegian War
- Awards: Grand Cross of the Dannebrog Order

Bernhard Ditlef von Staffeldt was born on 23 October 1753 in Kenz, Swedish Pomerania, as the son of Lieutenant Bernt von Staffeldt, of Pomeranian nobility, and Catherine Eleonore von Platen. Both his parents died in 1755 while he was still a child; he was raised at his married sister's estate in Denmark and was taken into the court of Queen Sophia Magdalene of Brandenburg-Kulmbach in 1767.

== Early years ==
At Queen Sophie's death in 1770, Staffeldt joined the military and traveled to Norway, where he in 1771 was promoted to second lieutenant. His stay in Norway, however, was to be short, because in 1773 he was transferred back to Copenhagen as part of the Life Grenadier regiment. This however, opened up more opportunities since he from 1776 where to be regarded as a part of the Danish nobility, and he rose rapidly through the ranks and was promoted to first lieutenant in 1782 and captain in 1785. In 1787 he returned to Norway as commander of the Kongsvinger light infantry.

When his company in 1788 were included in the newly formed Norwegian Jäger corps, Staffeldt was promoted to major. In the same year he participated with his new unit, in the skirmish at Kvistrum bridge during the Theater War against Sweden. After the war he went to Holstein, where he in 1790 and 1792 learned about the contemporary sharpshooting tactics, and later established the first non-commissioned officer school for Jäger Corps in Norway. After his stay in Holstein, he returned to Norway and married Karen Birgitte Herford in Moss in 1797.

== Military career ==
When war broke out against the United Kingdom in 1801, Staffeldt received command of the brigade that would cover Fredriksvern against a British invasion. But since the war against Britain in the first phase calmed down after the battle of Copenhagen, Staffeldt and his Jäger Corps was transferred back to Kongsvinger, where he for a while became provisional commander on Kongsvinger Fortress. He also received command over Ullensaker light infantry battalion and the southern skier battalion. In 1803 he was promoted to colonel.

When the war with the United Kingdom broke out again in 1807 after the bombardment of Copenhagen, Staffeldt was located in Holstein. But he was quickly sent to Altona to confiscate British-owned property, and later to Sjælland where he was commissioned to reorganize the coastal defense.

The following winter he returned to Norway and took command over the brigade assembled at Hedrum, and when Denmark–Norway declared war against Sweden in the spring of 1808, he received commanded the Norwegian left wing brigade, which was to defend the border crossings from Elverum towards Kongsvinger with about 1,300 men. The Swedish western army's right wing under Colonel Carl Pontus Gahn, who had orders to advance to Glomma from northern Värmland, therefore met Staffeldt's forces as they moved across the border on 24 April, and were surrounded and forced to surrender at Trangen. After this victory, Staffeldt could concentrate most of his troops around Kongsvinger against Gustaf Mauritz Armfelt's advance. Here he was again given the post as commander of the fortress at the same time as his brigade was reinforced. The fighting that followed led to varying success, but the Swedes retreated back across the border in early June 1808. Staffeldt's and his brigade attracted much attention during this war, and won great acclaim. This was reflected by Staffeldt's promotion to major general and the appointment to Commander of Dannebrog in 1809.

When peace was concluded with Sweden in 1809, Staffeldt was given the command over the troops who were drawn together at Hedrum. From there he took responsibility for much of the reorganization that was done of the Norwegian Army in 1810. In 1813 he received charge of a brigade in Smaalenenes Amt, and when Prince Christian Frederik in the winter of 1814 traveled to Trondheim, Staffeldt became supreme commander of the southern army with the authority to take measures for the countries security.

After Denmark-Norway's final defeat during the Napoleonic Wars in 1814, the Treaty of Kiel was finalized by representatives from Denmark, Sweden and the United Kingdom, and it was determined that Norway should be ceded to Sweden. This however, was something the Norwegians opposed, and instead declared themselves independent and appointed Prince Christian Frederick to Norwegian king. This further led to the outbreak of war between Sweden and Norway in the summer of 1814. On 22 May that year Staffeldt was appointed to lieutenant general, was intended to lead an important role in Norway's defense during the subsequent campaigns against the Swedes. He was given command of a brigade of around 4,000 men who was to lead an active defense east of Glomma. The active defense would, however, prove unsuccessful since King Christian Frederik drew the Norwegian troops back across Glomma against von Staffeldt's advice. The responsibility for the army's weak leadership and the subsequent withdrawal was largely put on von Staffeldt, who had to relinquish his position in favor of Major General Arenfeldt and was instead assigned to ensure the front's left flank. The war was from the Norwegian side also affected by confusion and unclear orders from the headquarters, and after the war Staffeldt was one of those who was convicted.

== Death ==
Staffeldt nevertheless was not found guilty by the war commission, but when the verdict was presented for the Supreme Court he was sentenced to death on 17 December 1816. This sentence was already then considered unfair by the Norwegian population, and Crown Prince Charles John reduced the sentence to imprisonment in Fredriksten Fortress. Here he sat from February to May 1817, but because of his health he was released and moved to his property at Hedrum, where he died on 11 January 1818.
