= Høsterkøb =

- Town
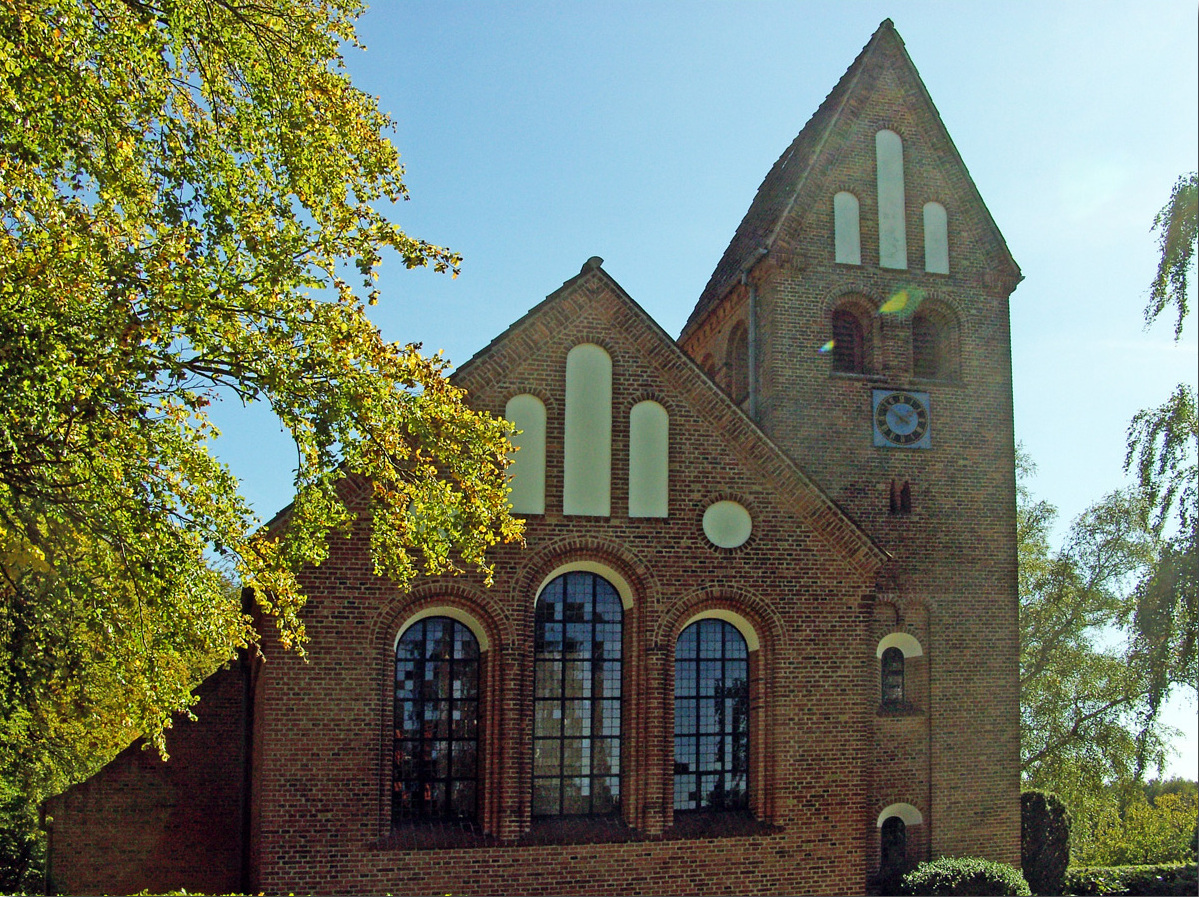
- Høsterkøb Church

- Location in Denmark
- Coordinates: 55°51′18″N 12°28′59″E
- Country: Denmark
- Region: Capital (Hovedstaden)
- Municipality: Rudersdal

Population (2026)
  - Total: 315
- Time zone: UTC+1 (CET)
  - Summer (DST): UTC+2 (CEST)
- Postal code: 3250

Høsterkøb is a village in Rudersdal Municipality, some 20 kilometres (12 mi) north of central Copenhagen, Denmark. It is bounded on the south by Rude Forest and on the north by open fields.

== Etymology ==
The name is derived from Husfrecop. The first part of the name means hustru ("wife") while the suffix -køb, which is only seen in toponyms from the north of Zealand and Scania, means "purchased land" ("købt jord"). Høsterkøb thus means "land purchased by (a) wife".

== History ==
The village was probably founded some time during the transition between the Viking Age and the Middle Ages (900–1100). It is first recorded in a letter from 1186 where Pope Urban III thinks Bishop Absalon for giving it to Roskilde bishopric. It is also mentioned in the Roskilde Bishopric Census Book (Roskildebispens jordebog) from 1370. The area was administrated from Hjortholm Castle at Furesøen in Frederiksdal

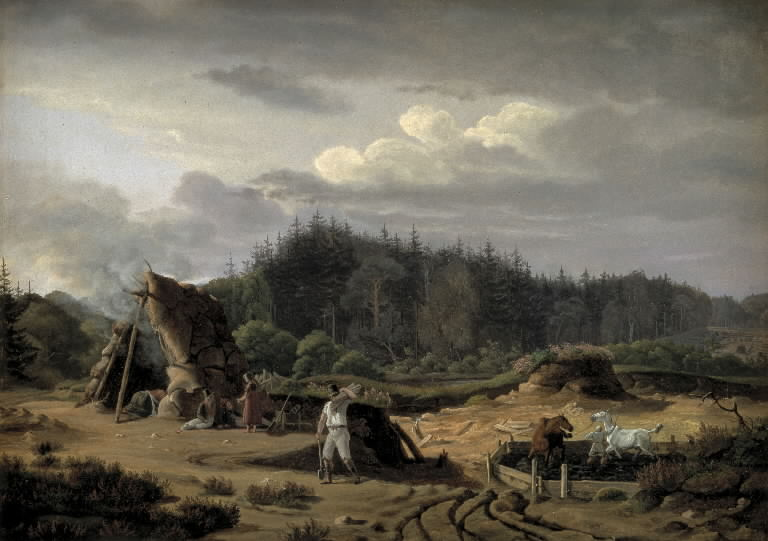
A Bog with Peat Cutters. Høsterkøb, painting by Fritz Petzholdt from the 1820s

After the Reformation, when the Crown confiscated all land owned by the Church, Høsterkøb came under the Hørsholm Estate. This lasted until the 1760s when queen Sophie Magdalene introduced the first Danish agricultural reforms.

Strategically located near the king's road to Hørsholm (Hørsholm Kongevej), the village had its own inn from at least the 17th century. The villagers were generally better off than those in other nearby villages. The area was known for its production of fruit, mostly cherries, and vegetables that was sold on the market in Copenhagen. Over a period of several hundred years, the area was used for harvesting peat. An outbreak of plaque in 1711 killed a hundred residents, half of Høsterkøb's population. Its proximity to Copenhagen made Høsterkøb a popular country retreat in the 20th century.

== Landmarks ==
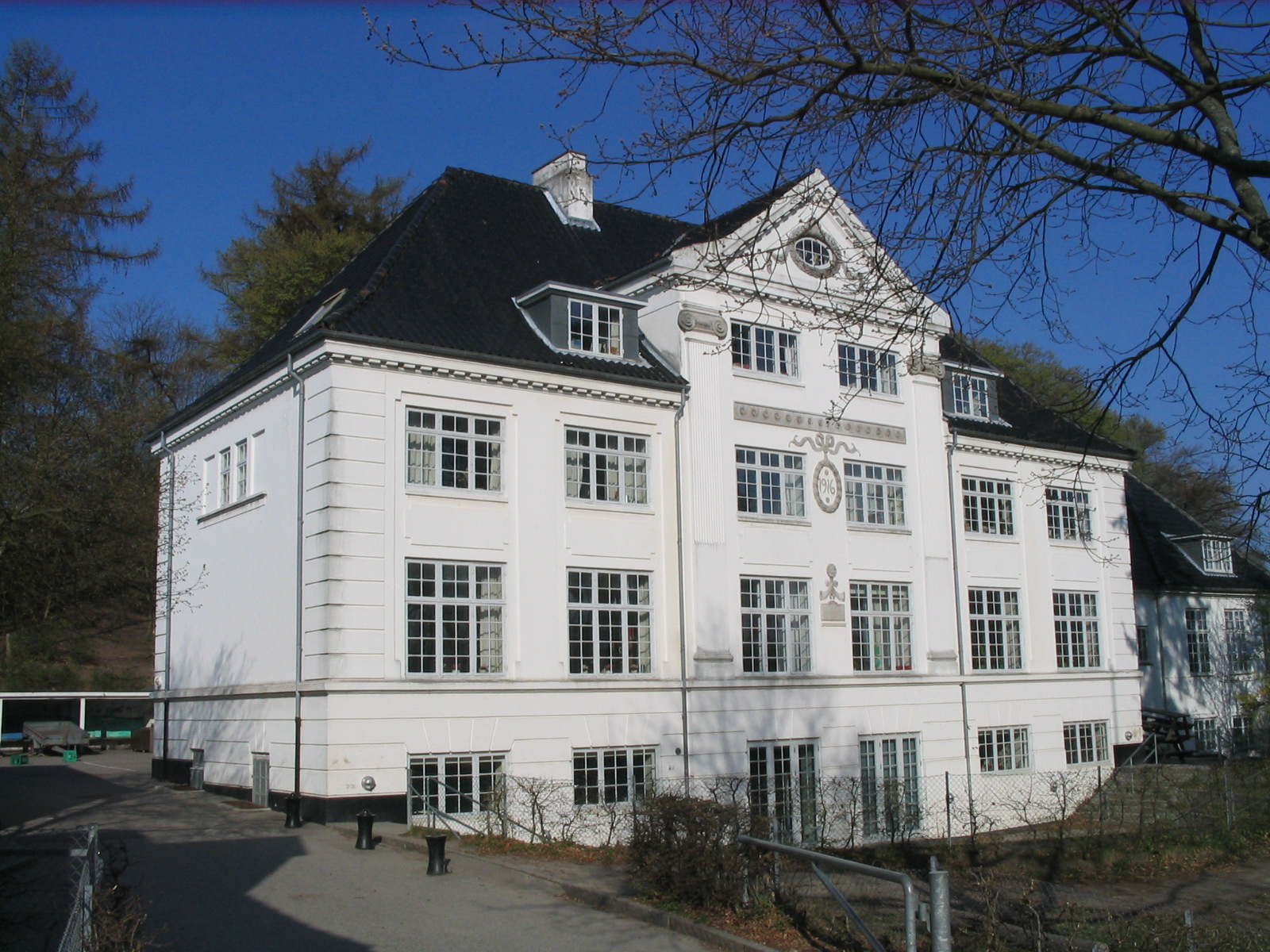
Høsterkøb School

Many of the old farms and country houses still exist, some of the larger ones being Friheden, Lundegaard, Nygaard and Petersborg. The largest property in Høsterkøb is Friheden, which stands on 30 hectares (74 acres) of land on the northeastern outskirts of the village.

Høsterkøb Church was built in 1908 to a design by Ulrik Plesner. The altarpiece is from 1500 and was transferred from Birkerød Church. The Romanesque font came from Lynge Church. Thorvald Bindesbøll has contributed to the interior decorations.

The current Høsterkøb School on Nedenomsvej was built in 1916 as a replacement for an older school building from 1864. Next to the school is a community centre. The local kindergarten is in a former orphanage from 1882.

A country house from the 1920s was in 1942 acquired by the Order of Saint Benedict and converted into the Convent of Our Lady. On the other side of the street, the Catholic church also owns Meglås, a former country house now operated as an educational centre. The house is from 1910 and was built by Aage Westenholtz, Karen Blixen's uncle, who supported her economically when her African farm faced bankruptcy.
