= Prestebakke =

Village in Halden municipality, Norway

Coordinates: 58.9919°N 11.5356°E

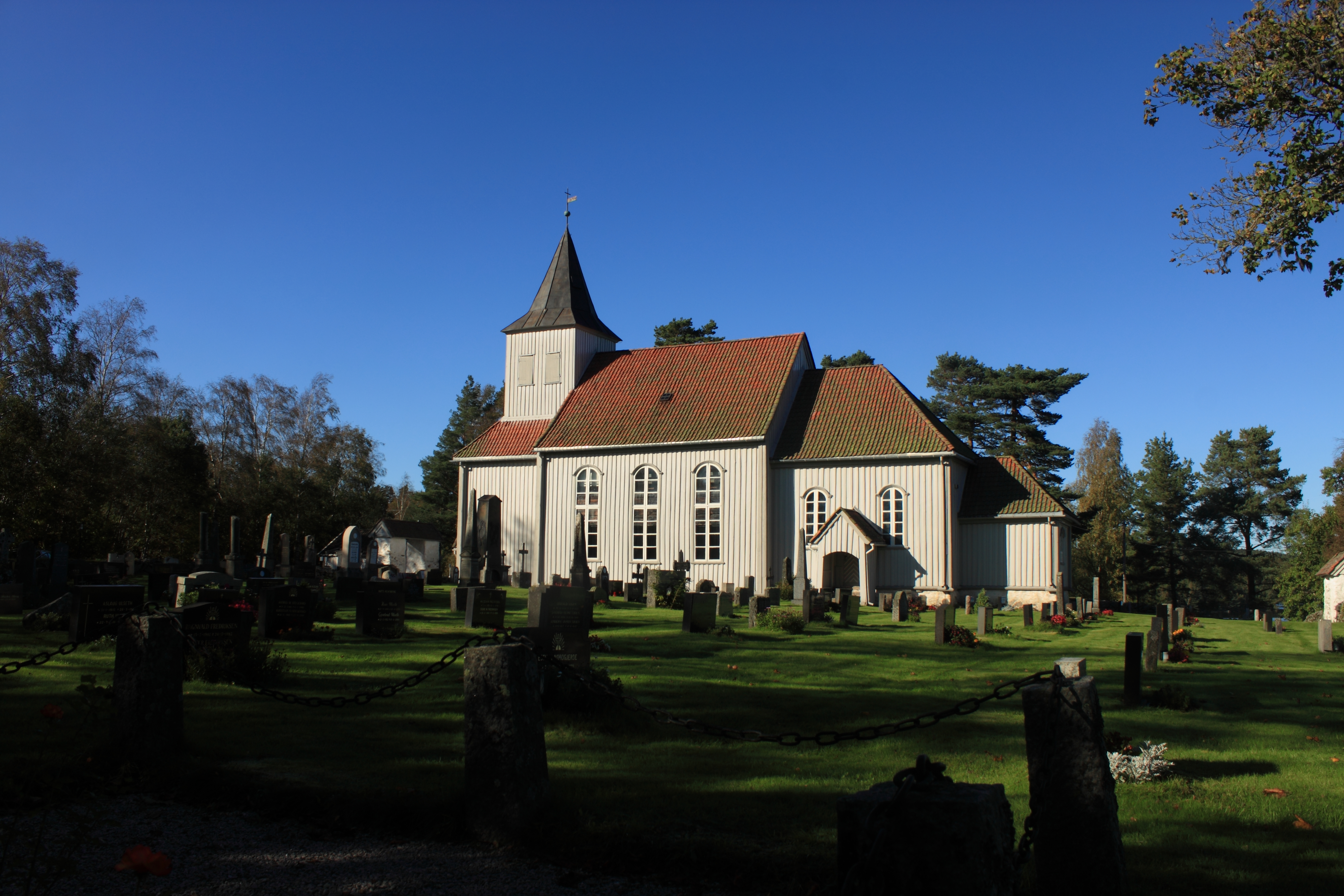
Prestebakke Church

Prestebakke is a village in the municipality of Halden in Østfold county, Norway.

== Climate ==
Prestebakke has a subarctic climate (Dfc).

Climate data for Prestebakke 1961-1990, extremes 1965-2010
Month	Jan	Feb	Mar	Apr	May	Jun	Jul	Aug	Sep	Oct	Nov	Dec	Year
Record high °C (°F)	8.6 (47.5)	11.3 (52.3)	16.5 (61.7)	26.9 (80.4)	27.1 (80.8)	30.2 (86.4)	31.5 (88.7)	32.0 (89.6)	25.4 (77.7)	18.5 (65.3)	13.0 (55.4)	9.6 (49.3)	32.0 (89.6)
Mean daily maximum °C (°F)	−1.4 (29.5)	−0.7 (30.7)	3.2 (37.8)	8.1 (46.6)	15.0 (59.0)	19.3 (66.7)	20.3 (68.5)	19.2 (66.6)	14.3 (57.7)	9.2 (48.6)	3.8 (38.8)	0.6 (33.1)	9.2 (48.6)
Mean daily minimum °C (°F)	−7.0 (19.4)	−7.4 (18.7)	−4.1 (24.6)	−0.8 (30.6)	4.8 (40.6)	9.2 (48.6)	11.0 (51.8)	10.1 (50.2)	7.0 (44.6)	3.7 (38.7)	−1.2 (29.8)	−4.9 (23.2)	1.7 (35.1)
Record low °C (°F)	−27.5 (−17.5)	−33.0 (−27.4)	−26.0 (−14.8)	−14.2 (6.4)	−5.1 (22.8)	−1.0 (30.2)	3.0 (37.4)	1.0 (33.8)	−4.0 (24.8)	−10.0 (14.0)	−19.5 (−3.1)	−27.5 (−17.5)	−33.0 (−27.4)
Average precipitation mm (inches)	66 (2.6)	48 (1.9)	55 (2.2)	47 (1.9)	59 (2.3)	78 (3.1)	76 (3.0)	84 (3.3)	98 (3.9)	113 (4.4)	100 (3.9)	71 (2.8)	895 (35.3)
Average precipitation days	11.6	8.0	10.2	7.8	9.0	10.0	9.9	10.4	11.8	12.8	13.5	11.3	126.3
Source: Met Norway Eklima
