= Lier entrenchment =

Coordinates: 60°09′09″N 12°02′41″E

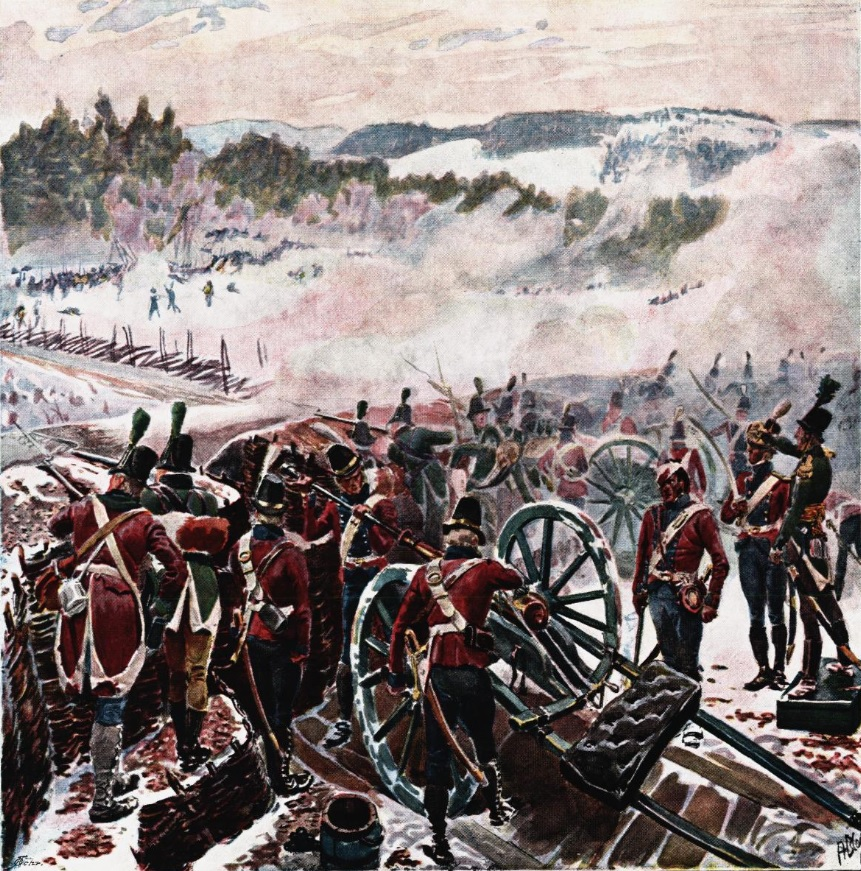
Andreas Bloch: Battle of Lier 1808

The Lier entrenchment is south of Kongsvinger in Norway. It was the site of battles in 1808 and 1814.

== See also ==
- Franco-Swedish War
