= Henrik Angell =

Norwegian military officer (1861–1922)

Henrik August Angell
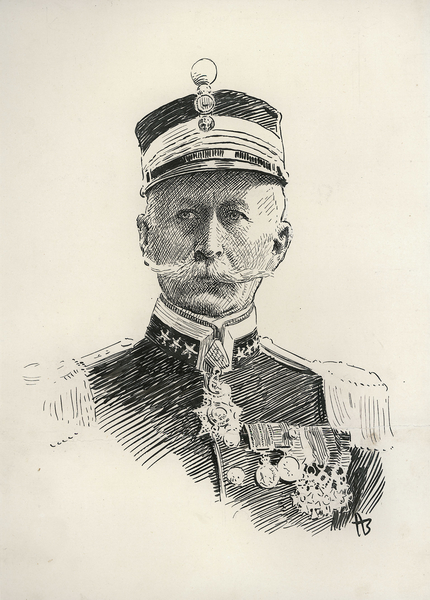
- Drawing of Henrik Angell by Andreas Bloch
- Born: 22 August 1861; Lyster, Norway
- Died: 26 January 1922 (aged 60); Kristiania, Norway
- Military career
- Allegiance: Norway
- Branch: Army Infantry
- Service years: 1877–1918; 1918–1919 with French Foreign Legion
- Rank: Colonel
- Commands: Søndermør, Smaalenene
- Conflicts: World War I with French Foreign Legion
- Awards: 1st class of the Norwegian Medal for noble deeds, 4th class of the Order of Prince Danilo I, 2nd class of the Order of St. Sava, 3rd class of the Order of the Medjidie, knight 1st class Order of the Sword, knight of the Order of the Dannebrog, officer of the Order of the Redeemer, Legion of Honour
- Other work: author

Henrik August Angell (22 August 1861 – 26 January 1922) was a Norwegian military officer, sportsman, and writer. He was a ski pioneer and the first Norwegian delegate to the International Olympic Committee.

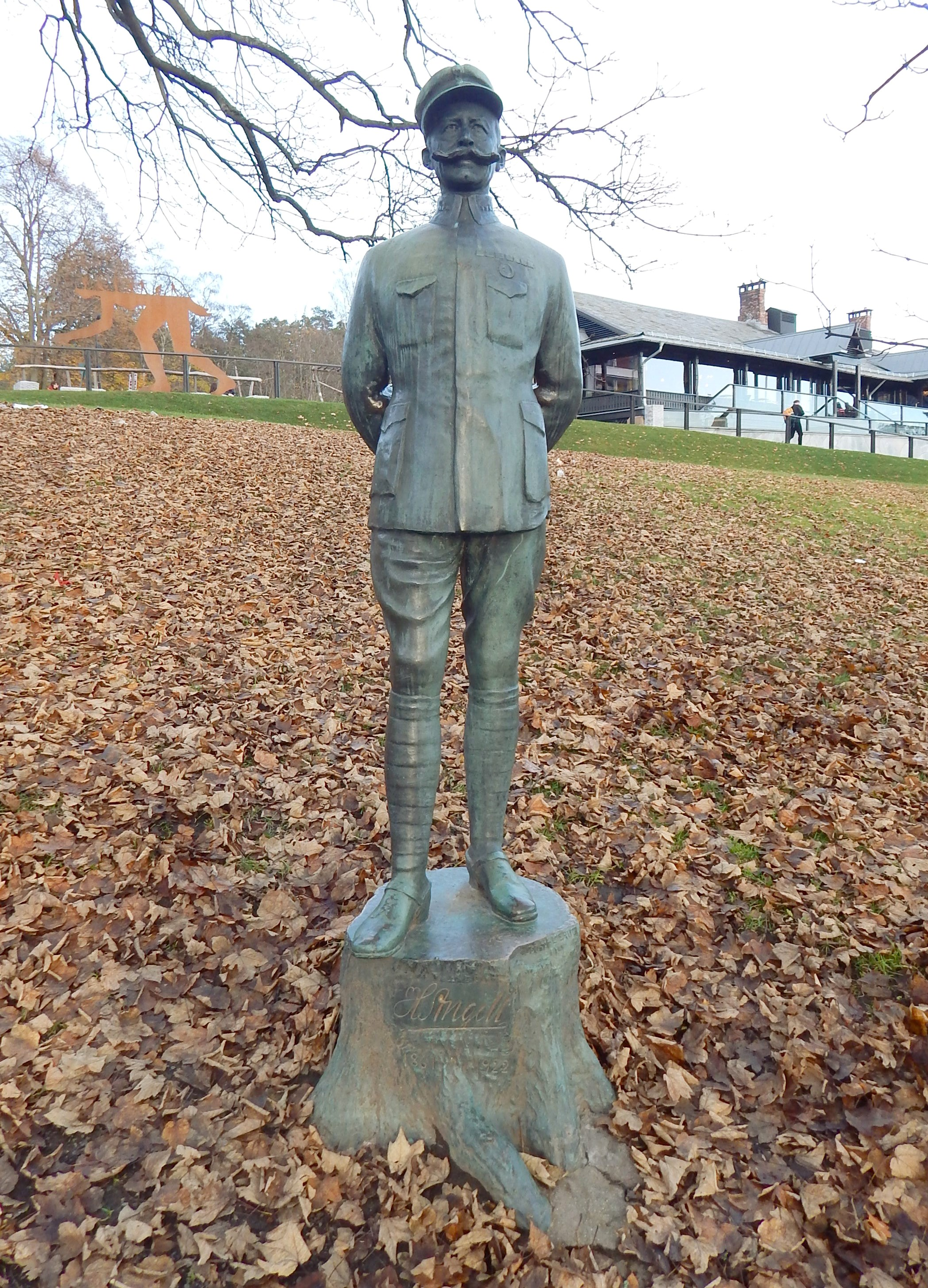
Monument to Colonel Henrik August Angell by Gustav Lærum, 1923

== Early life ==
Henrik Angell was born on 22 August 1861 in Lyster Municipality (now spelled Luster) in Nordre Bergenhus county, Norway. He grew up in the city of Bergen. He was the son of Johan Mølmann Anderson Lysholm Angell (1820–88) and his wife Marie With Bonnevie (1830–1904). In 1890 he married Gerhardine Henriette de Sérène d'Acqueria.

He received an education at the Norwegian Military Academy and entered the Norwegian Army.

== Military career ==
In 1897 he visited Greece to study their infantry in action. He was a colonel and regiment chief from 1911. He was commander leader of the Søndermør Infantry Regiment until 1914 and of the Smaalenene Infantry Regiment until 1918. He joined the French Foreign Legion in 1918, and participated on the Western Front for France in World War I. It was whilst he was deployed in Northern Russia that he had a severe case of frostbite, resulting in both of his feet and several fingers being amputated. He was appointed as an officer of the Legion of Honour for his service during the North Russia intervention.

== Skiing and literary work ==
Angell introduced skiing to Montenegro in 1893, was admitted to the skiing club SK Ull in 1898, founded the Norwegian Ski School in 1903, invited to the Alps to teach French soldiers to ski, and was a sports advocate. He wrote several books promoting skiing and Norwegian nationalism. He also wrote a series of military history books.

== Death and legacy ==
He died on 26 January 1922 in Kristiania (now Oslo), Norway. His statue by Gustav Lærum is located at Holmenkollen in Oslo.

== Selected works ==
- Naar et lidet Folk kjæmper for Livet : serbiske Soldaterfortællinger (1914)
- Gjennem Montenegro paa ski (1895)
- De sorte fjeldes sønner (1896)
- Kaptein Jürgensen og Leirdølerne hans (1901)
- Et sterkt folk (1902)
- Norges krigshistorie (1906)
- Norsk Skilauparsoge (1908)
- Syv-aars-krigen for 17. mai 1807–1814 (1914)
- For Frankrigs ret og ære: fra den franske front (1918)

Sporting positions
New seat (due to Norway's independence)	Norway's member of the International Olympic Committee; 1905–1907	Succeeded by Thomas Heftye
