= Jämtland campaigns (1808–1809) =

Dano-Norwegian invasions of Sweden

Jämtland campaigns of 1808–1809
- Part of the Dano-Swedish War of 1808–09
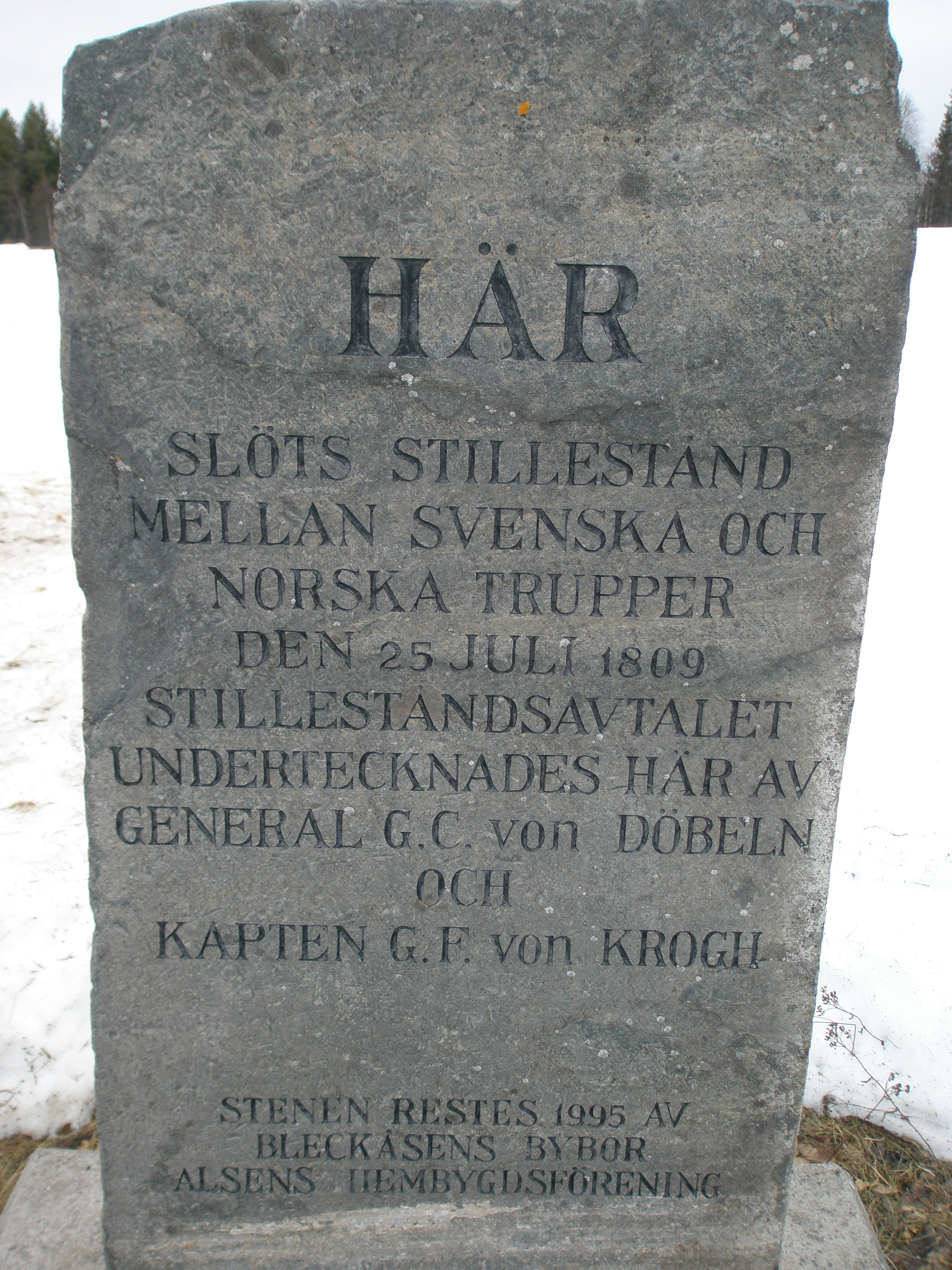
- Armistice monument in Bleckåsen
Date	1808: August; 1809: July
Location	Jämtland, Sweden
Result	Swedish victory

Belligerents
Sweden	Denmark-Norway

Commanders and leaders
1808: Unknown; 1809: Georg Carl von Döbeln	1808: Carsten Gerhard Bang; 1809: Georg Frederik von Krogh

Strength
1808: Unknown; 1809: 900 men	1808: 1,200 men 1809: 1,800 men

Casualties and losses
1808: 6 wounded	1808: 1 killed 5 wounded

The Jämtland campaigns of 1808–1809 were two Dano-Norwegian military campaigns into the Swedish province of Jämtland during the Dano-Swedish War of 1808-1809.

== Campaign of 1808 ==
In mid-August, Major Coldevin began his invasion of Jämtland with 644 men, consisting of musketeers, dragoons, skiers and artillerymen. Coldevin's campaign would however soon encounter difficulties when parts of the army began to rebel. Coldevin managed however to prevent the rebellion by using threats, and since he still had the dragoons on his side the force continued their march into Jämtland. At the same time as Coldevin, Colonel Carsten Gerhard Bang also marched from Røros and into Härjedalen with about 550 men, but Colonel Bang's force did not take part in any battle during the campaign.

After many efforts Coldevin reached Dove entrenchment on 13 August. The entrenchment had recently been built, but had not been equipped with cannons as well as no troops had been stations where, but Swedish scouts in the area still reported that 2,100 Norwegian troops were moving into Jämtland. Dove entrenchment was destroyed by the Norwegians before they continued their march, and reached Hjerpe entrenchment at Järpen on 15 August. Hjerpe entrenchment was located across a wide strait and was defended by two Swedish companies.

On 16 August, the Norwegians attacked the entrenchment, and the unsuccessful assault lasted from about three o'clock in the afternoon until darkness fell. After the about six-hour-long battle the Swedes had six men wounded, of which one later died. The Norwegians had one killed while five were wounded (two severely). On the following day, on 17 August, Coldevin began the march back to Norway after the Swedish troops at Hjerpe entrenchment had received reinforcements. Colonel Bang was awarded the Knight's Cross of the Order of the Dannebrog for his efforts during the campaign.

== Campaign of 1809 ==
Denmark-Norway and Sweden had been at war since 14 March 1808 as a result of Denmark-Norway being allied to Napoleon's France and Sweden being allied to United Kingdom. By July 1809 the Danish government and king Frederick VI, who at the time did not considered it feasible to launch an invasion of Scania from Denmark, had for a while been putting pressure on the commander of the forces in Norway, Christian August, to launch an attack on Sweden, and, if possible, cooperate with the Russian forces that were also invading Sweden as part of the Finnish War. An earlier invasion under Colonel Carsten Gerhard Bang had been launched into Sweden the year prior, but had failed after a Dano-Norwegian assault on the entrenchments at Hjerpe Skans was repelled by the Swedish defenders. Christian August was reluctant to put the 7,000 poorly equipped soldiers under his command into action—in part due to the fact he was seeking to be chosen as the successor to the childless Swedish king Charles XIII (which he would be later in 1809, only to die the very next year)—but acquiesced to the demands to launch an invasion so as to avoid being blatantly insubordinate. To this end, on 2 July, Christian August ordered major general Georg Frederik von Krogh, who was commanding the forces stationed in northern Norway, to launch an invasion of Sweden. The 1st Trondheim Infantry Regiment was among the forces assigned to the campaign; 1,800 soldiers from the Trondheim area were to be sent into Jämtland, while 1,400 soldiers from the Røros area were to be sent into Härjedalen, two Swedish provinces on the border with Norway that at the time lacked defenders. The Swedish military command had first received intelligence about the possible impending invasion from Norway in late June, and the responsibility of meeting this threat fell to lieutenant general Georg Carl von Döbeln. On 10 July the 1,800-man strong Norwegian force crossed the border into Jämtland, and in response to this von Döbeln sent 280 men of the Hälsinge regiment stationed in Sundsvall westwards and sent a battalion from Dalarna stationed in Gävle to defend Härjedalen. He also requested immediate reinforcements, to which the Swedish government sent the Life Grenadier Regiment, a 6-pounder gun and later also the Kalmar Regiment.

The Norwegians reached Järpen on 16 July and captured Hjerpe Skans without facing any resistance, with a Swedish force of 200 men under Colonel Theodore Nordenadler abandoning it shortly before the arrival of the Norwegians and the Hälsinge regiment force of 280 men being in Östersund. Soon afterwards the Norwegians also captured the villages of Mörsil and Mattmar. It was around then that van Krogh received word of a rumour that the Swedes and Russians were about to agree to a 6-week ceasefire. This prompted von Krogh to halt his advance at Hjerpe Skans and call off the planned invasion of Härjedalen. This allowed von Döbeln to amass his forces, and on 24 July he received word that the Norwegian forces had been given the order to return to Norway. Upon learning this van Döbeln decided to attack on the Norwegians, despite only having 900 men; however, before he was able to launch his attack, the Norwegians entered negotiations- Van Döbeln, who on 18 July had learned that Christian August had been selected to become the Crown Prince of Sweden, was willing to accept a ceasefire on the condition that the Norwegians immediately return to Norway, which they agreed to do. An armistice was signed on 25 July at Bleckåsen in Alsens, marking the end of the invasion.

== Sources ==
- Angell, Henrik (1914). Syv-Aars-Krigen for 17. Mai 1807–1814. Kristiania: H. Aschehoug & Co.
- Starbäck, Carl Georg; Bäckström, Per Olof (1885–86). Berättelser ur svenska historien [Stories from the History of Sweden] (in Swedish). Vol. 10: Carl XIII. Carl XIV Johan. Stockholm: F. & G. Beijers Förlag. p. 39. Archived from the original on 1 May 2026 – via Projekt Runeberg.
- Nordensvan, Carl Otto (1898). "Sommaren i Västerbotten och Ångermanland" [The summer in Westrobothnia and Ångermanland]. Finska kriget 1808-1809 [The Finnish War 1808-1809] (in Swedish). Stockholm: Albert Bonniers Förlag. pp. 458–459 – via Projekt Runeberg.
  Page 458 (Archived 1 April 2026). Page 459 (Archived 1 April 2026).
- Jensen, Åke F. (1995). Kavaleriet i Norge, 1200-1994. Oslo: Elanders Publishing. ISBN 82-90545-43-6.
