= Ryden =

Ryden is a surname. Notable people with the surname include:

- Alexander Rydén (born 1988), Swedish climber and skier
- Folke Rydén (born 1958), Swedish journalist
- George Ryden (born 1940), Scottish football player
- Hope Ryden (1929–2017), American photographer, filmmaker and wildlife activist
- Hugh Ryden (born 1943), Scottish football player
- Jean Halpert–Ryden (1919–2011), American visual artist
- John Ryden (1931–2013), Scottish football player
- Kalen Ryden (born 1991), American soccer player
- Kent Ryden, Professor of American and New England Studies
- Mark Ryden (born 1963), American surrealist painter, brother of KRK Ryden
- Su Ryden, American politician (Colorado representative)
- Susanne Rydén (born 1962), Swedish soprano
- Vassula Rydén (1942–2024), Egyptian-Swiss Christian mystic and author
