= Gåije =

Village in Åre Municipality, Sweden

Coordinates: 63°13′50″N 14°7′30″E

Gåije is a village in Jämtland, in Åre Municipality, Jämtland County, Sweden. It has about 40 inhabitants. In October 2012, Gåije won the Swedish Postcode Lottery, creating millionaires in 7 of the town's 15 households.
