= Alexander Rydén =

Swedish climber and skier

Personal information
- Nationality: Swedish
- Born: 9 December 1988 (age 36); Edsåsdalen, Åre Municipality, Sweden

Sport
- Sport: Climbing and skiing

Alexander Rydén (born December 9, 1988, Edsåsdalen) is a Swedish former elite-level climber, gimbal operator, and filmmaker. Rydén is also known as a followcam skier, which involves skiing with a camera next to other athletes.

== Early life ==
Rydén was born and raised in Edsåsdalen, a small ski resort in Åre Municipality, Jämtland County, northern Sweden. He started filming his friends as a teenager, eventually becoming a professional followcam skier.

== Sporting career ==
=== Skiing ===
Rydén's skiing career spans 30 years and includes multiple extreme ski descents. His skiing highlights include steep skiing on the Chlyn Wendenstock and Marcelo Couloir, as well as a famous 20m cliff jump in Sweden known as the Högsta, Östra Ravin.

=== Rock climbing ===
Rydén has been a rock climber for 18 years. He has performed in numerous first ascents and competitions at the Swedish elite level. His rock climbing highlights include a 7c+ onsight on Arugliopoulos, a 500m big wall on Presten, and a 7c+ first ascent on Via Burrata. He has achieved 40 first ascents between 6c and 7c+, 30 onsights graded 7b+ or harder, and has completed 40 multipitch routes. Rydén has also completed a free solo ascent of Vit November, graded 6c+.

In 2017, Alexander performed a rope swing stunt from Åre Kabinbana in Sweden. This stunt was a fusion of bungee jumping and a high-intensity playground swing and took place at a ski resort. With the help of an aerial circus technician, Rydén executed this massive rope swing from the resort's cable car.

== Filmmaking and followcam skiing ==
Rydén works as a filmmaker and gimbal operator. As a filmmaker, he has collaborated with Moncler, Ford, Red Bull, GoPro, Thule, Discovery, Visa, Peak Performance, Sunrise, Cake, and others.

His filmmaking credits include serving as a camera operator for the skiing documentaries Shades of Winter: Between (2016) and Aksel (2021).

Rydén is noted for being a followcam skier, which involves skiing with a camera next to other skiers. He has followed athletes such as Shawn White, Marco Odermatt, Axel Lund Svindal, Henrik Windstedt, and Kristoffer Turdell with a camera, capturing their performances in sports documentaries and feature films.
