= Höglekardalen =

Village in Jämtland County, Sweden

Coordinates: 63.080481°N 13.771158°E

Höglekardalen is a small village in Åre Municipality, Jämtland County in central to northwestern Sweden. Since it has got fewer than 200 inhabitants it does not meet the requirements to be a formal locality. It hosts a weather station and an outdoors sports area both in summer and winter. It is located in a steep valley between high mountains.

== Climate ==
Höglekardalen has hosted an SMHI weather station since 1962. Höglekardalen has a subarctic climate (Köppen Dfc), with long, cold, albeit moderated winters and short summers where warm days are rare. Due to the influence from the North Atlantic Current, Höglekardalen receives plenty of snow in winter and also frequent rainfall in summer. The all-time heat record is at 30.2 °C (86.4 °F) in July 2019. The record cold is −43.8 °C (−46.8 °F), although in general, winter means often stay around −7 °C (19 °F).

Climate data for Höglekardalen (2002–2022 averages; extremes since 1962)
Month	Jan	Feb	Mar	Apr	May	Jun	Jul	Aug	Sep	Oct	Nov	Dec	Year
Record high °C (°F)	8.9 (48.0)	9.2 (48.6)	13.6 (56.5)	17.5 (63.5)	27.6 (81.7)	28.6 (83.5)	30.2 (86.4)	27.5 (81.5)	23.5 (74.3)	19.8 (67.6)	11.8 (53.2)	10.8 (51.4)	30.2 (86.4)
Mean maximum °C (°F)	3.9 (39.0)	4.6 (40.3)	8.2 (46.8)	13.2 (55.8)	21.1 (70.0)	24.5 (76.1)	25.8 (78.4)	23.9 (75.0)	19.3 (66.7)	12.6 (54.7)	7.3 (45.1)	5.1 (41.2)	26.9 (80.4)
Mean daily maximum °C (°F)	−3.4 (25.9)	−2.5 (27.5)	1.0 (33.8)	5.8 (42.4)	11.2 (52.2)	15.9 (60.6)	18.4 (65.1)	16.8 (62.2)	11.9 (53.4)	5.3 (41.5)	0.4 (32.7)	−2.1 (28.2)	6.6 (43.8)
Daily mean °C (°F)	−7.4 (18.7)	−6.8 (19.8)	−4.0 (24.8)	0.8 (33.4)	5.9 (42.6)	10.0 (50.0)	12.9 (55.2)	11.6 (52.9)	7.5 (45.5)	1.8 (35.2)	−3.0 (26.6)	−6.1 (21.0)	1.9 (35.5)
Mean daily minimum °C (°F)	−11.4 (11.5)	−11.0 (12.2)	−8.9 (16.0)	−4.2 (24.4)	0.5 (32.9)	5.0 (41.0)	7.4 (45.3)	6.3 (43.3)	3.0 (37.4)	−1.7 (28.9)	−6.4 (20.5)	−10.0 (14.0)	−2.6 (27.3)
Mean minimum °C (°F)	−26.1 (−15.0)	−26.0 (−14.8)	−23.3 (−9.9)	−15.4 (4.3)	−6.9 (19.6)	−2.1 (28.2)	0.0 (32.0)	−1.1 (30.0)	−4.1 (24.6)	−11.9 (10.6)	−18.1 (−0.6)	−22.4 (−8.3)	−29.7 (−21.5)
Record low °C (°F)	−43.8 (−46.8)	−40.0 (−40.0)	−34.0 (−29.2)	−26.5 (−15.7)	−16.1 (3.0)	−6.2 (20.8)	−3.1 (26.4)	−4.3 (24.3)	−10.6 (12.9)	−23.8 (−10.8)	−30.6 (−23.1)	−35.6 (−32.1)	−43.8 (−46.8)
Average precipitation mm (inches)	65.5 (2.58)	35.8 (1.41)	43.2 (1.70)	40.7 (1.60)	57.2 (2.25)	90.8 (3.57)	97.5 (3.84)	110.5 (4.35)	73.3 (2.89)	74.5 (2.93)	53.9 (2.12)	61.3 (2.41)	804.2 (31.65)
Source 1: SMHI Open Data
Source 2: SMHI Monthly Data 2002–2022
