= Björnänge =

- Location within Jämtland Location within Sweden
- Coordinates: 63°22′45″N 13°08′45″E
- Country: Sweden
- Province: Jämtland
- County: Jämtland County
- Municipality: Åre Municipality

Area
  - Total: 0.40 km^{2} (0.15 sq mi)

Population (31 December 2010)
  - Total: 254
  - Density: 636/km^{2} (1,650/sq mi)
- Time zone: UTC+1 (CET)
  - Summer (DST): UTC+2 (CEST)

Björnänge is a locality situated in Åre Municipality, Jämtland County, Sweden with 254 inhabitants in 2010.
