= Mörsils IF =

Swedish football club

- Full name: Mörsils Idrottsförening
- Ground: Bleckåsvallen IP; Mörsil; Sweden
- Chairman: Torbjörn Eriksson
- League: Division 4 Jämtland/Härjedalen
Home colours	Away colours

Mörsils IF is an active sports club located in Mörsil in Åre Municipality, Jämtland County, Sweden. Boström is a famous Mörsil family.

== Background ==
Mörsils Idrottsförening has sections covering football, bandy, table tennis, skiing and also has sections and activities for gymnastics, tennis, badminton, skating activities and a Sports School for 6 to 15 year olds.

The Sports Hall was built by Mörsil IF in 1987 and can accommodate most indoor sports. There is also an outdoor ice rink and a small swimming pool.

Mörsils IF currently plays in Division 4 Jämtland/Härjedalen which is the sixth tier of Swedish football. They play their home matches at the Bleckåsvallen IP in Mörsil.

The club is affiliated to Jämtland-Härjedalens Fotbollförbund.

== Season to season ==
Season	Level	Division	Section	Position	Movements
2009	Tier 7	Division 5	Jämtland/Härjedalen	5th	
2010	Tier 7	Division 5	Jämtland/Härjedalen	3rd	Promoted
2011	Tier 6	Division 4	Jämtland/Härjedalen	8th	

* League restructuring in 2006 resulted in a new division being created at Tier 3 and subsequent divisions dropping a level.
