= Skalstugan =

Village in Åre Municipality, Sweden

Coordinates: 63°34′26″N 12°16′32″E

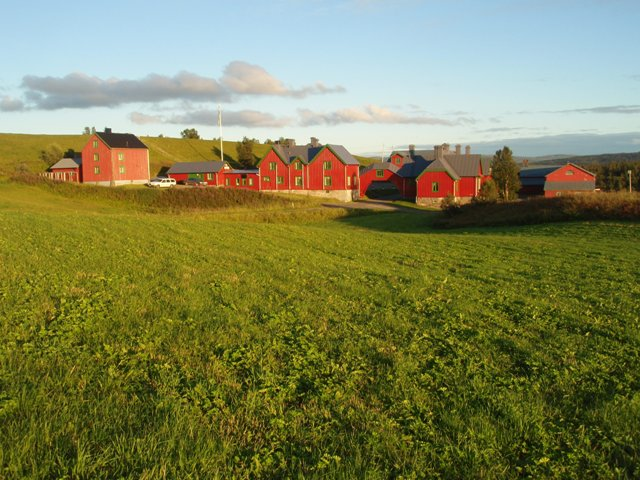
Skalstugan in 2008

Skalstugan is a small village in Åre Municipality, Jämtland. It is the last Swedish western outpost on road 322 between Duved and Norway. Road 322 is an ancient trade and traveling route to the Old Norse market place in Levanger and has history dating further back than the Viking Age.
