= Duved =

Duved may refer to:

- Đuveč, oven-baked beef and vegetable stew
- Duved, Sweden, locality situated in Sweden
- Duved (ski area)
