= Hallen, Sweden =

Hallen
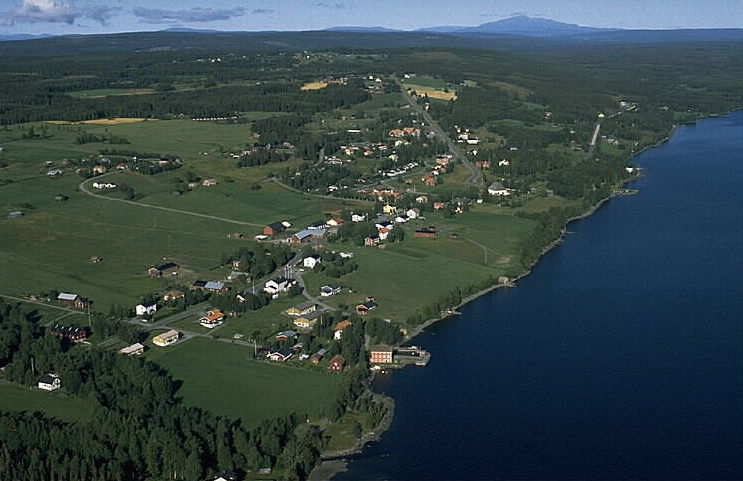

- Location within Jämtland Location within Sweden
- Coordinates: 63°11′N 14°05′E
- Country: Sweden
- Province: Jämtland
- County: Jämtland County
- Municipality: Åre Municipality

Area
  - Total: 0.46 km^{2} (0.18 sq mi)

Population (31 December 2010)
  - Total: 203
  - Density: 445/km^{2} (1,150/sq mi)
- Time zone: UTC+1 (CET)
  - Summer (DST): UTC+2 (CEST)

Hallen is a locality situated in Åre Municipality, Jämtland County, Sweden with 203 inhabitants in 2010.
