= 1st Trondheim Infantry Regiment =

Military unit of Denmark-Norway, 1718–1817

- Første Trondhjemske Infanteriregiment
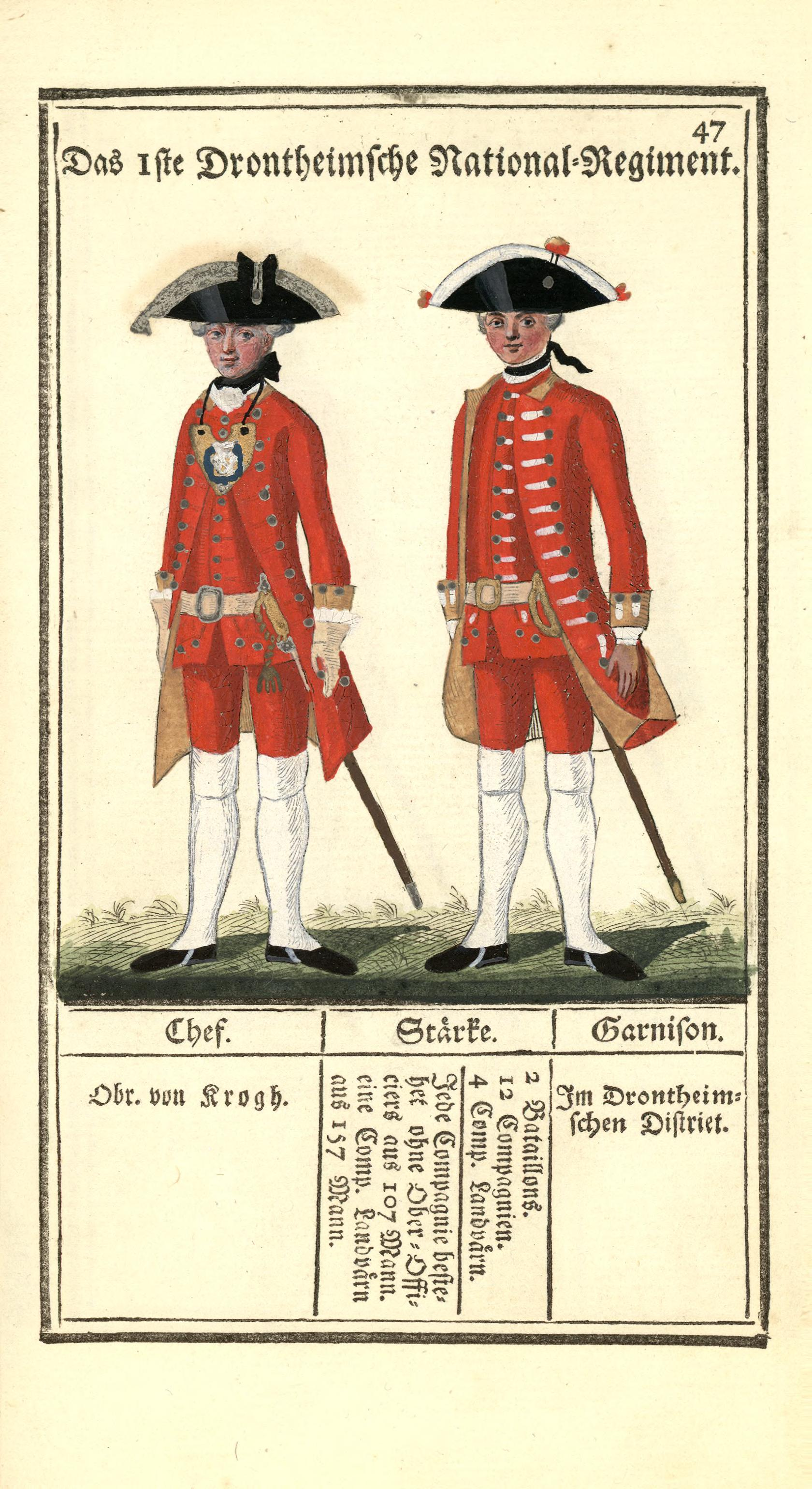
- Uniforms of the 1st Trondheim Infantry Regiment.
- Active: 1718–1817
- Country: Denmark–Norway
- Allegiance: Royal Dano-Norwegian Army
- Branch: Army
- Type: Infantry

Commanders
- Notable commanders: Col. Baltzer Meitzner (first); Capt. Georg Ulrik Wasmuth; Sgt. Daniel Larsen Schevig; Carsten Gerhard Bang (last)

The 1st Trondheim Infantry Regiment (Norwegian: Første Trondhjemske Infanteriregiment) was an infantry regiment of Denmark-Norway.

== History ==
The regiment was formed by dividing the old Trondheim Infantry Regiment into three separate units, the 1st, 2nd, and 3rd Trondheim Infantry Regiments. The companies of the 1st Trondheim Infantry Regiment were garrisoned in Innherred and Nærøy. After another division in 1789, the 3rd Trondheim Regiment was disbanded, and its companies in Melhus, Selbu and Fosen were transferred to the 1st Trondheim Regiment.

During the Dano-Swedish War of 1808-1809, the regiment participated in the Jämtland campaigns. particularly during the campaign of 1809, where troops within the regiment were sent into the Jämtland area.

According to the army plan of 1810, the army had nine infantry regiments. These included three enlisted infantry regiments, each typically containing 800 enlisted and 1,200 "national" (discharged) privates, as well as six national infantry regiments, each typically containing 200 enlisted and 1,800 national privates. The national infantry regiments included the two Trondheim regiments, as well as the Akershus Sharpshooter Regiment, Bergenhus Infantry Regiment, Tellermark Infantry Regiment, and Vesterlenske Infantry Regiment. Generally, at least half of the troops in the army were furloughed, and the full strength of the regiment was only assembled during yearly exercises. Accordingly, the 1st Trondheim Regiment in 1789 had two grenadier companies and three "national" battalions, the latter composed of discharged privates.

The regiment participated during the Dano-Swedish War, particularly in combat actions in Trøndelag, as well as in skirmishes around the area south of the Glomma river.

During the preparations for the Norwegian Constituent Assembly in Eidsvoll in 1814, the regiment, like other military units, appointed two of its military personnel to represent them in the Constituent Assembly, being Captain Georg Ulrik Wasmuth and Sergeant Daniel Larsen Schevig.

Following the Army Regulations of 1818, which was adopted on 3 July 1817, the regiment was disbanded at the end of 1817. Due to its focus on companies in Nord-Trøndelag and exercise activities in Steinkjersannan, the regiment's successor is perceived to be the Nord-Trøndelag Infantry Regiment No. 13, as well as the Nord-Trøndelag Infantry Regiment.
