= Kent Ryden =

Kent Ryden is a professor of American and New England Studies at the University of Southern Maine. He is known for writing and teaching in the fields of regional literature, cultural geography, folklore and environmental humanities.

== Early life and education ==
Ryden earned his BA at Carroll College, in Waukesha, Wisconsin, an MA from the University of Connecticut, and PhD in American Civilization from Brown University in Providence, Rhode Island. He was awarded the Ralph Henry Gabriel Dissertation prize for his thesis work.

== Career ==
Ryden's thesis was later revised into his first book, Mapping the Invisible Landscape: Folklore, Writing and the Sense of Place. He has authored two other books, Landscape with Figures: Nature and Culture in New England and Sum of the Parts: The Mathematics and Politics of Region, Place and Writing.

Ryden's studies of the relationships between geographic places and their effect on the emotions, and behavior and story-telling of the people who inhabit them have been extensively cited.

On September 12, 2015, as an instructor, Ryden went to Change Islands, Newfoundland, Canada with 9 students from Memorial University of Newfoundland.

== Selected publications ==
- "Miners." In American Folklore: An Encyclopedia, edited by Jan Harold Brunvand. New York: Garland, 1996. 485–87.
- "Landscape with Figures: Nature, Folk Culture, and the Human Ecology of American Environmental Writing." Interdisciplinary Studies in Literature and Environment 4:1 (1997), 1-28.
- "Writing the Midwest: History, Literature, and Regional Identity." Geographical Review 89:4 (October 1999): 511–32.
- "Big Trees, Back Yards, and the Borders of Nature." Michigan Quarterly Review 40:1 (Winter 2001): 126–40.
- "Robert Frost, the New England Environment, and the Discourse of Objects." Beyond Nature Writing: Expanding the Boundaries of Ecocriticism, edited by Karla Armbruster and Kathleen Wallace. Charlottesville: University Press of Virginia, 2001. 295–310.
- "Environment and Imagination in New England." Maine History 40:1 (spring 2001): 70–74.
- "New England Literature and Regional Identity." The Blackwell Companion to the Regional Literatures of the United States, edited by Charles L. Crow. Malden, Mass.: Blackwell, 2003. 195–212.
- "Region, Place, and Resistance in Northern New England Writing." Colby Quarterly 39:1 (March 2003): 109–20.
- "The Regional Context of Main Street: Word and Image." Grant Wood’s Main Street: Art, Literature, and the American Midwest, edited by Lea Rosson DeLong. Ames, Ia.: University Museums, Iowa State University, 2004. 223–28.
- "Writing Portland: Literature and the Production of Place." Creating Portland: History and Place in Northern New England, edited by Joseph A. Conforti. Hanover, N.H.: University Press of New England, 2005. 173–92.
- "Tuttle Road: Landscape as Environmental Text." In Search of a Common Language: Environmental Writing and Education, edited by Melody Graulich and Paul Crumbley. Logan: Utah State University Press, 2005. 89–101.
- "Media and Regional Identity." The Encyclopedia of New England, edited by Burt Feintuch and David H. Watters. New Haven: Yale University Press, 2005. 1138–39.
- "Why Your World Looks the Way It Does and Why It Matters: Cultural Landscape as Visual Culture." Visual Arts Research 32:1 (2006), 73–75.
- "Geography," "Landscape" (with Simon J. Bronner), "Maine, Downeast," and "New England" (with Simon J. Bronner). Encyclopedia of American Folklife, edited by Simon J. Bronner. Armonk, N.Y.: M. E. Sharpe, 2006. 485–88, 673–76, 735–37, 867–71.
- "Remaking Maine." Off the Grid: Maine Vernacular Environments, edited by Carolyn Eyler. Gorham, Maine: University of Southern Maine Art Galleries, 2007. 34–40.
- "Beneath the Surface: Natural Landscapes, Cultural Meanings, and Teaching about Place." Teaching about Place: Learning from the Land, edited by Laird Christensen and Hal Crimmel. Reno: University of Nevada Press, 2008. 125–36.
- "‘How Could a Weed Be a Book?’: Books, Ethics, Power, and A Sand County Almanac." Interdisciplinary Studies in Literature and Environment 15:1 (Winter 2008): 1-10.
- "The Environment’s Place in the Maine Imagination." Maine’s Place in the Environmental Imagination, edited by Michael Burke. Cambridge: Cambridge Scholars Publishing, 2008. 1–17.
- "The Corpse in the Stone Wall: Annie Proulx’s Ironic New England." The Geographical Imagination of Annie Proulx, edited by Alex Hunt. Lanham, Md.: Lexington Books, 2008. 73–85.
- "The Handselled Globe: Natural Systems, Cultural Process, and the Formation of the New England Landscape." New England: A Landscape History, edited by Blake Harrison and Richard Judd. Cambridge, Mass.: MIT Press, forthcoming.
- "The Nature of Region: Russell Banks, New Hampshire, and New York." The Bioregional Imagination, edited by Karla Armbruster, Cheryll Glotfelty, and Thomas Lynch. Athens: University of Georgia Press, forthcoming.
