= Edsåsdalen =

Ski area in Åre Municipality, Sweden

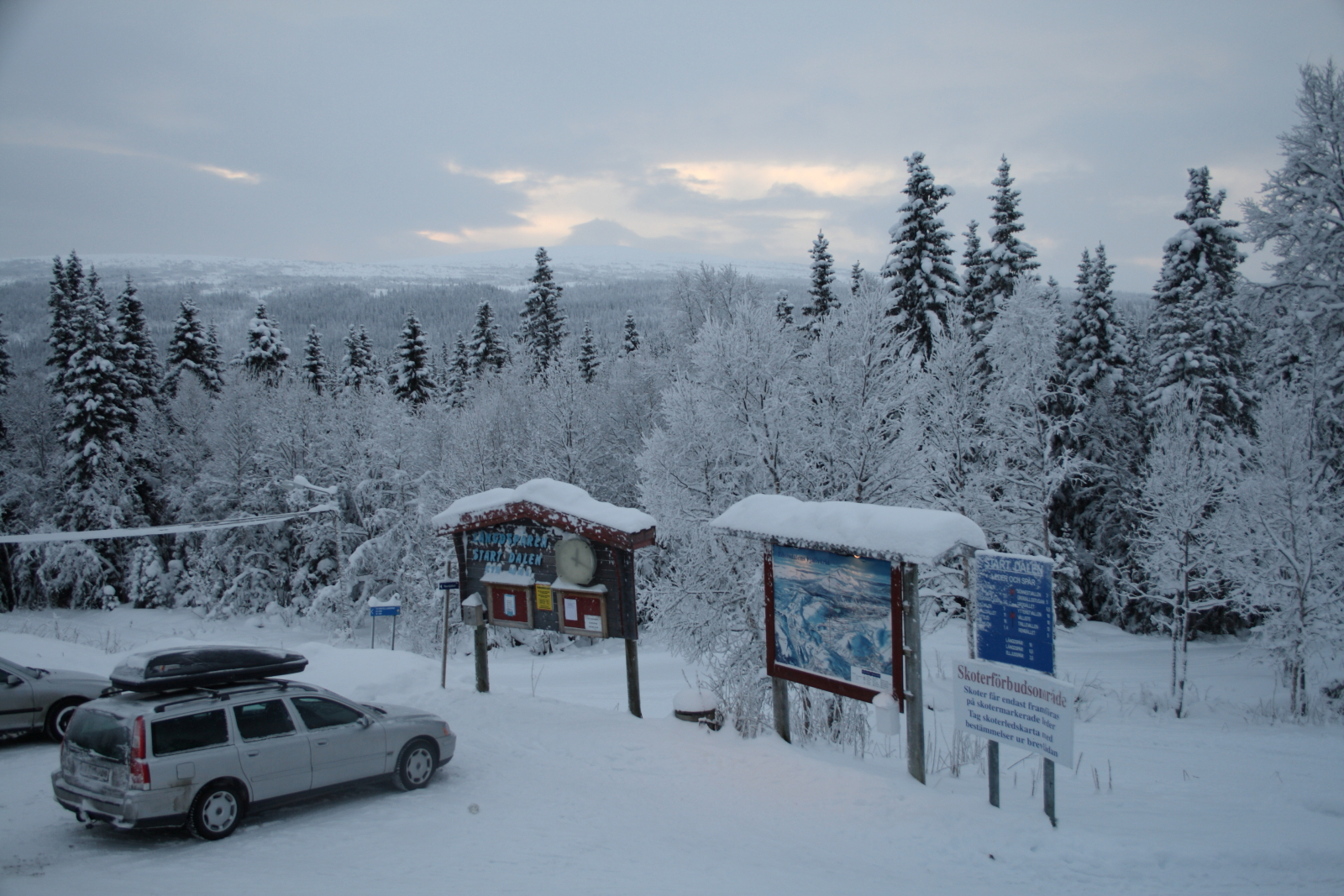
- End of road in Edsåsdalen
- Interactive map of Edsåsdalen
- Location: Renfjället
- Nearest city: Åre ~ 20 km (12 mi); Östersund ~ 92 km (57 mi); Trondheim ~ 189 km (117 mi)
- Coordinates: 63°18′54.98″N 13°5′6.96″E
- Vertical: 170 m (560 ft)
- Trails: 10: 30% easiest; 60% more difficult; 10% most difficult
- Longest run: 950 m (3,120 ft)
- Lift system: 5
- Night skiing: 3.5 km (2.2 mi) track
- Website: edsasdalen.se

Edsåsdalen is an alpine ski area in the Åre Municipality in Jämtland County, Sweden. The ski area has 10 runs and 5 lifts for downhill skiing on the southern slope of Renfjället. There are three prepared cross-country tracks with lengths of 3.5 km (2.2 mi), 6.5 km (4.0 mi) and 10 kilometres (6.2 mi); of which the 3.5 kilometres track is a lighted track for nightskiing. An outdoor shooting range is adjacent to the cross-country tracks for biathletes with a capacity of 40 persons.

The Edsåsdalen ski area is accessible by the approximately 8 kilometres (5.0 mi) long paved road from Undersåker. European route E14 passes Undersåker a few kilometres to the north, and connects with Östersund to the east and Trondheim, Norway, to the west. In Undersåker, there are also connections by railway to Östersund and Trondheim via the Central Line. Åre Östersund Airport and Trondheim Airport, Værnes, are the closest international airports.
