= Järpen =

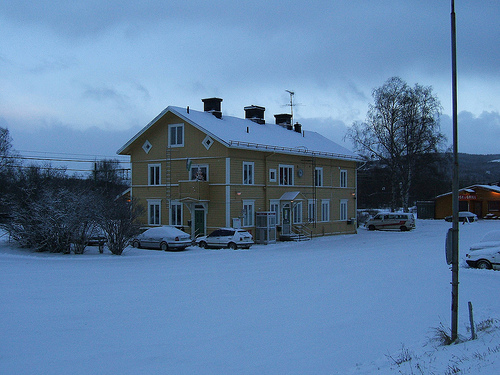
- Järpen Train Station in December 2005

- Location within Jämtland Location within Sweden
- Coordinates: 63°20′50″N 13°27′40″E
- Country: Sweden
- Province: Jämtland
- County: Jämtland County
- Municipality: Åre Municipality

Area
  - Total: 2.17 km^{2} (0.84 sq mi)

Population (31 December 2010)
  - Total: 1,408
  - Density: 648/km^{2} (1,680/sq mi)
- Time zone: UTC+1 (CET)
  - Summer (DST): UTC+2 (CEST)

Järpen (Swedish pronunciation: [ˈjæ̌rːpɛn]) is a locality and the seat of Åre Municipality in Jämtland County, Sweden with 1,408 inhabitants in 2010.

Järpen is located at an altitude of 324m/1,063 ft above sea level, on the river Indalsälven.

The calcareous soil of the surrounding area enables the growth of rare mosses and other plants.

Fäviken, recognized as one of the world's 100 best restaurants was located about 15 km (9 mi) northwest of Järpen village.
