= Mörsil =

- Location within Jämtland Location within Sweden
- Coordinates: 63°19′N 13°38′E
- Country: Sweden
- Province: Jämtland
- County: Jämtland County
- Municipality: Åre Municipality

Area
  - Total: 1.33 km^{2} (0.51 sq mi)

Population (31 December 2020)
  - Total: 851
  - Density: 642/km^{2} (1,660/sq mi)
- Time zone: UTC+1 (CET)
  - Summer (DST): UTC+2 (CEST)

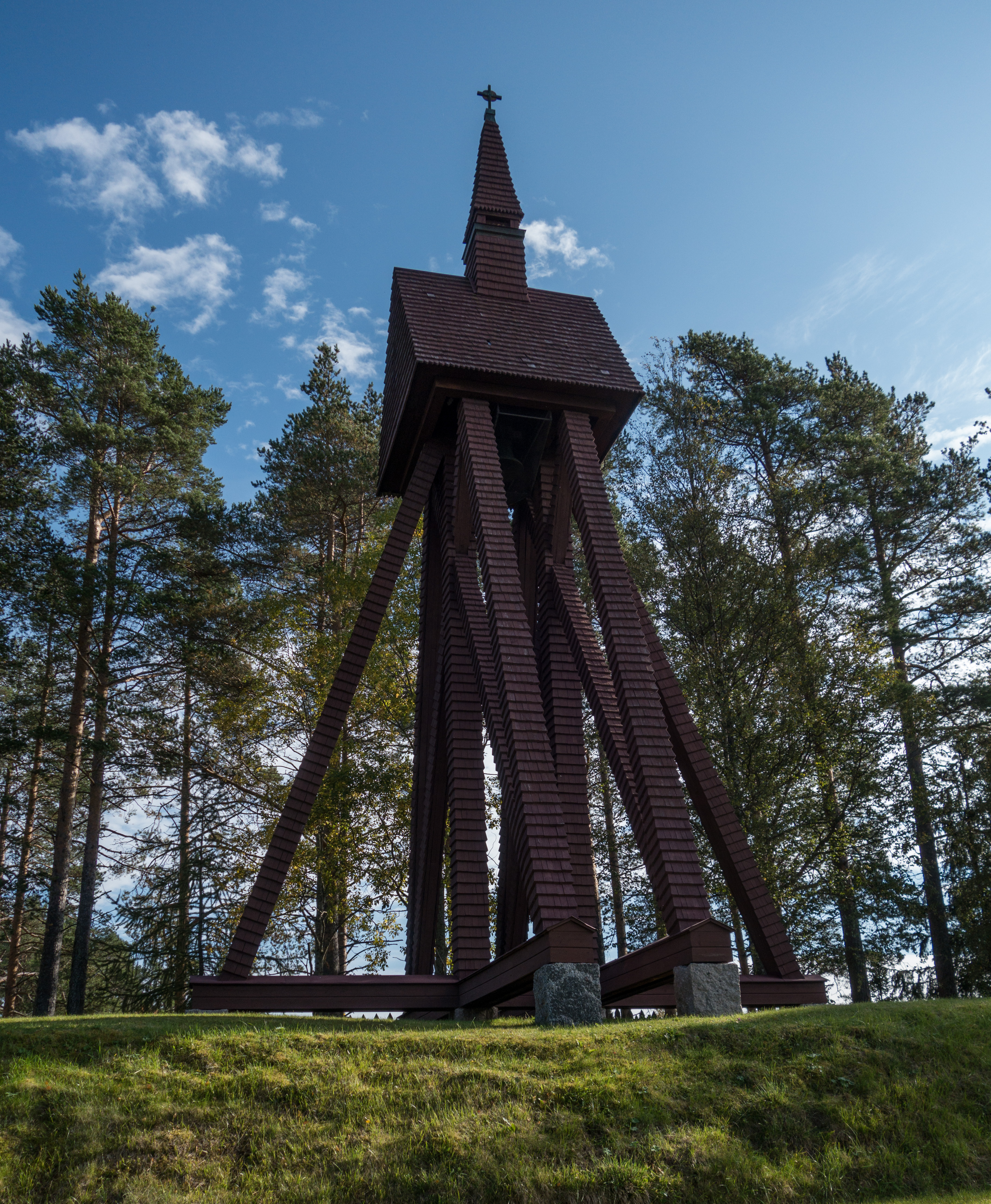
Mörsil Clocktower

Mörsil (Swedish pronunciation: [ˈmœ̂ːʂɪl]) is a locality situated in Åre Municipality, Jämtland County, Sweden with 851 inhabitants in 2022.

== History ==
Mörsil parish district has been inhabited since the Stone Age. Several trapping pits, sconces, and a copper hammer have been found.

During the Kalmar War between Denmark-Norway and Sweden, Sweden sent armies into Jämtland and established forts in several towns to stop advancing Norwegian/Danish armies. Among those towns to house forts were Mörsil, Frösön and Järpen.

Sweden's first sanatorium was opened in Mörsil in 1891. It was established in German fashion and consisted of several buildings including a main building, a bath house, and a physician's house. The sanatorium treated tuberculosis and part of its treatment regime involved taking walks through the surrounding mountains. The region of Jämtland, which includes Mörsil, were important for health-related tourism because of the many hospitals in the region.

At the turn of the 20th century the town was known for its spas and early industrialization. Population of the town increased during the mid-20th century partially due to the industry in Mörsil at the time. By 1965 the population was over 900 residents. However, by the 1970s the factories closed and the population diminished.

In 1974 the town was amalgamated into Åre municipality.

European Highway 14 runs through Mörsil. Since winter 2012 Mörsil has had a railway stop on the route between Sundsvall and Storlien, a few km west of the Norwegian border.

== Industry ==
Mörsil is home to a hydro electric power plant on Indalsälven.

== Culture ==
Mörsil lies along the St. Olav's Way which is part of the St. Olav's Pilgrimage to the Nidaros Cathedral in Trondheim, Norway, the site of the tomb of St. Olav.

Mörsil also has Kretsloppshuset: a tourist attraction/restaurant near the edge of town. The name literally translates as "the Circle of Life House" and is an organic attraction in a sustainable building with a garden that extends right into the restaurant. It raises free-range chickens and sells organic food and products in the store.

The town is also host to a sports club for people of all ages, a hunting and rifle club (and shooting range), and Åre Brukshundsklubb, a dog training and agility facility north of the E14.

Situated in the old-growth forests just north of the village are a series of well-lit walking, biking, and skiing trails ranging from 2.5 km to 15 km long.

== Sports ==
The following sports clubs are located in Mörsil:

- Mörsils IF
