= Duved, Sweden =

Duved
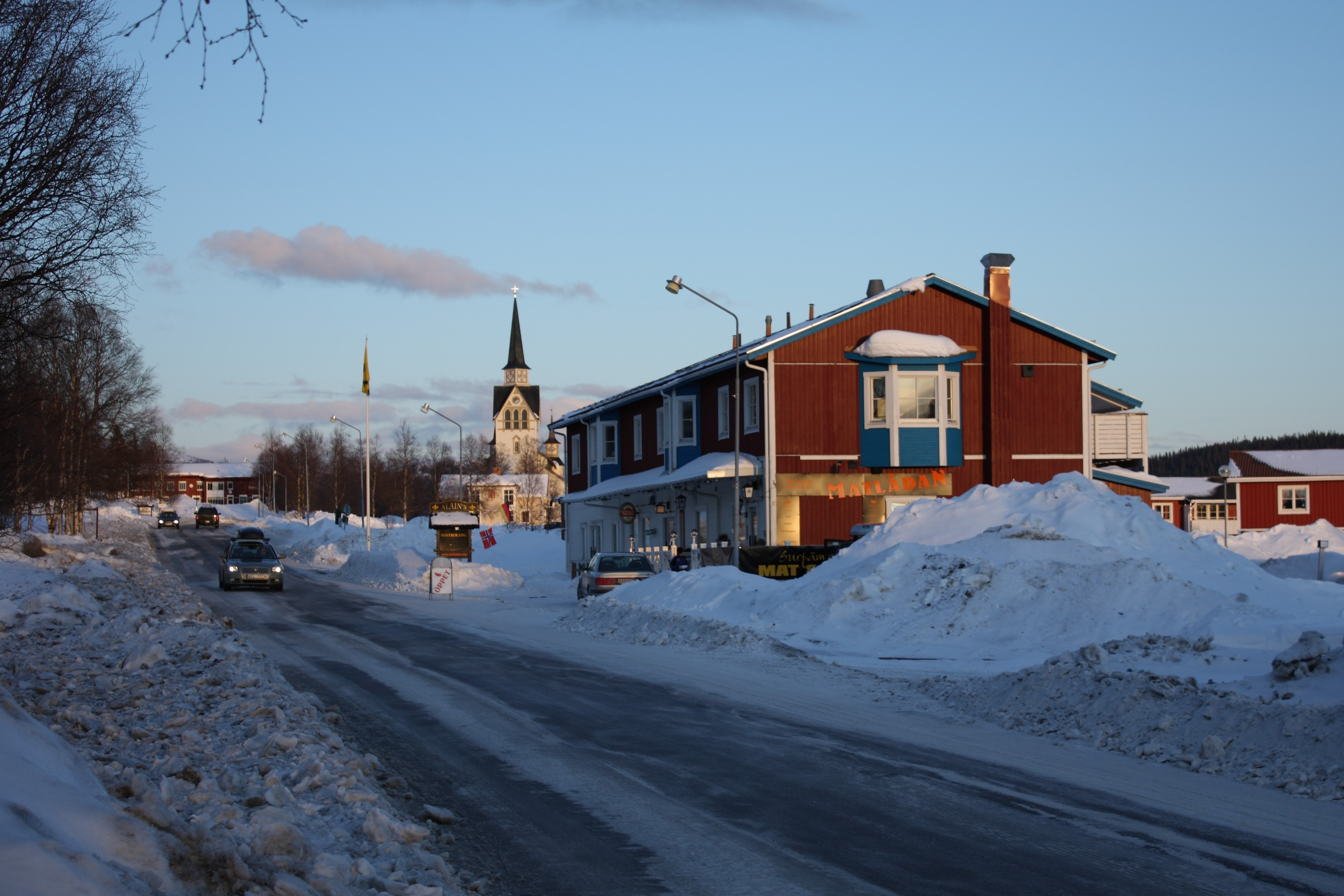

- Location within Jämtland Location within Sweden
- Coordinates: 63°24′N 12°52′E
- Country: Sweden
- Province: Jämtland
- County: Jämtland County
- Municipality: Åre Municipality

Area
  - Total: 0.99 km^{2} (0.38 sq mi)
- Elevation: 419 m (1,375 ft)

Population (31 December 2010)
  - Total: 663
  - Density: 671/km^{2} (1,740/sq mi)
- Time zone: UTC+1 (CET)
  - Summer (DST): UTC+2 (CEST)

Duved is a village (locality) situated in Åre Municipality, Jämtland County, Sweden with 663 inhabitants in 2010.

It is a resort village and has a station on the Mittbanan Line.

== Gallery ==
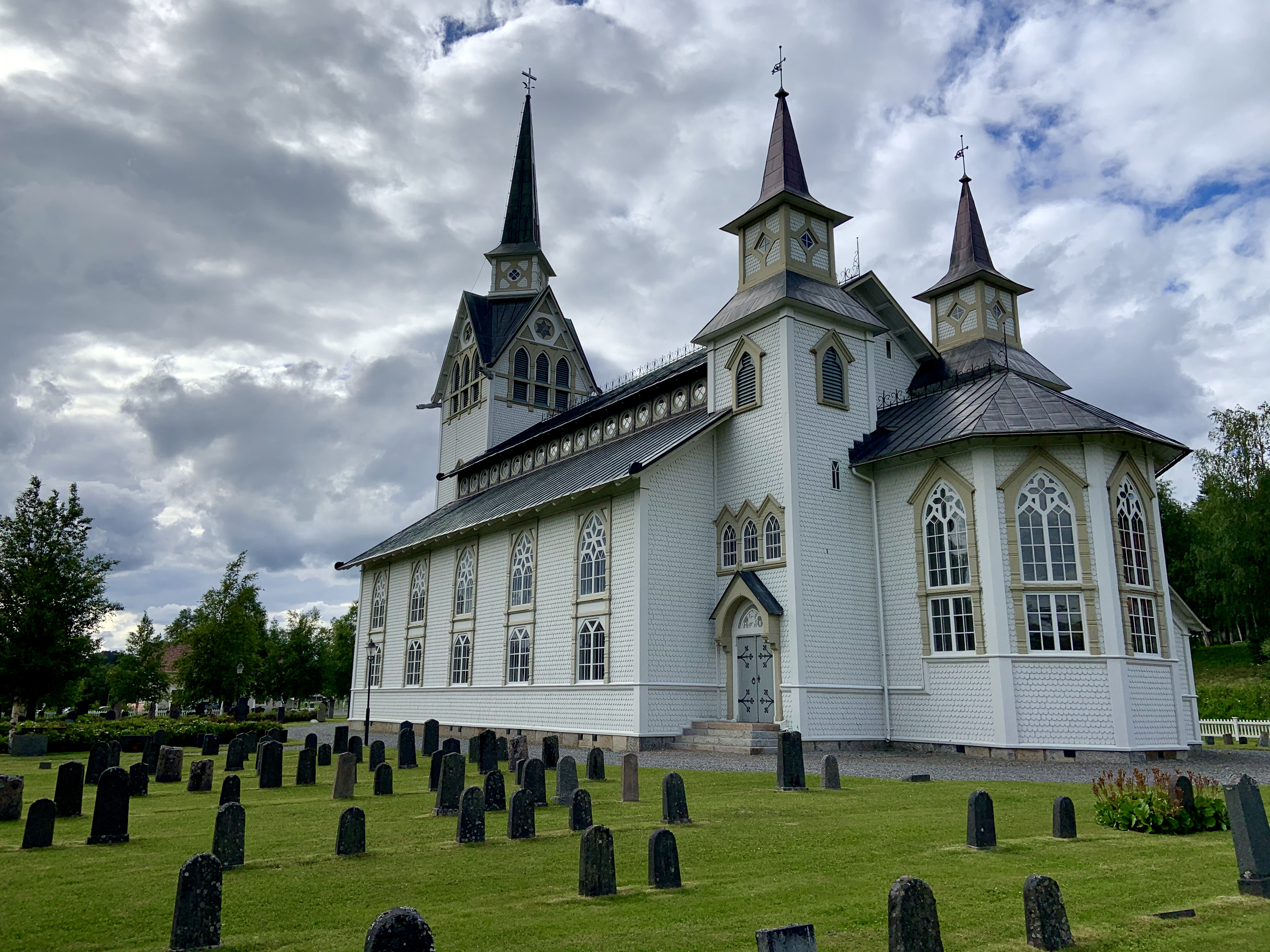
Duved Church

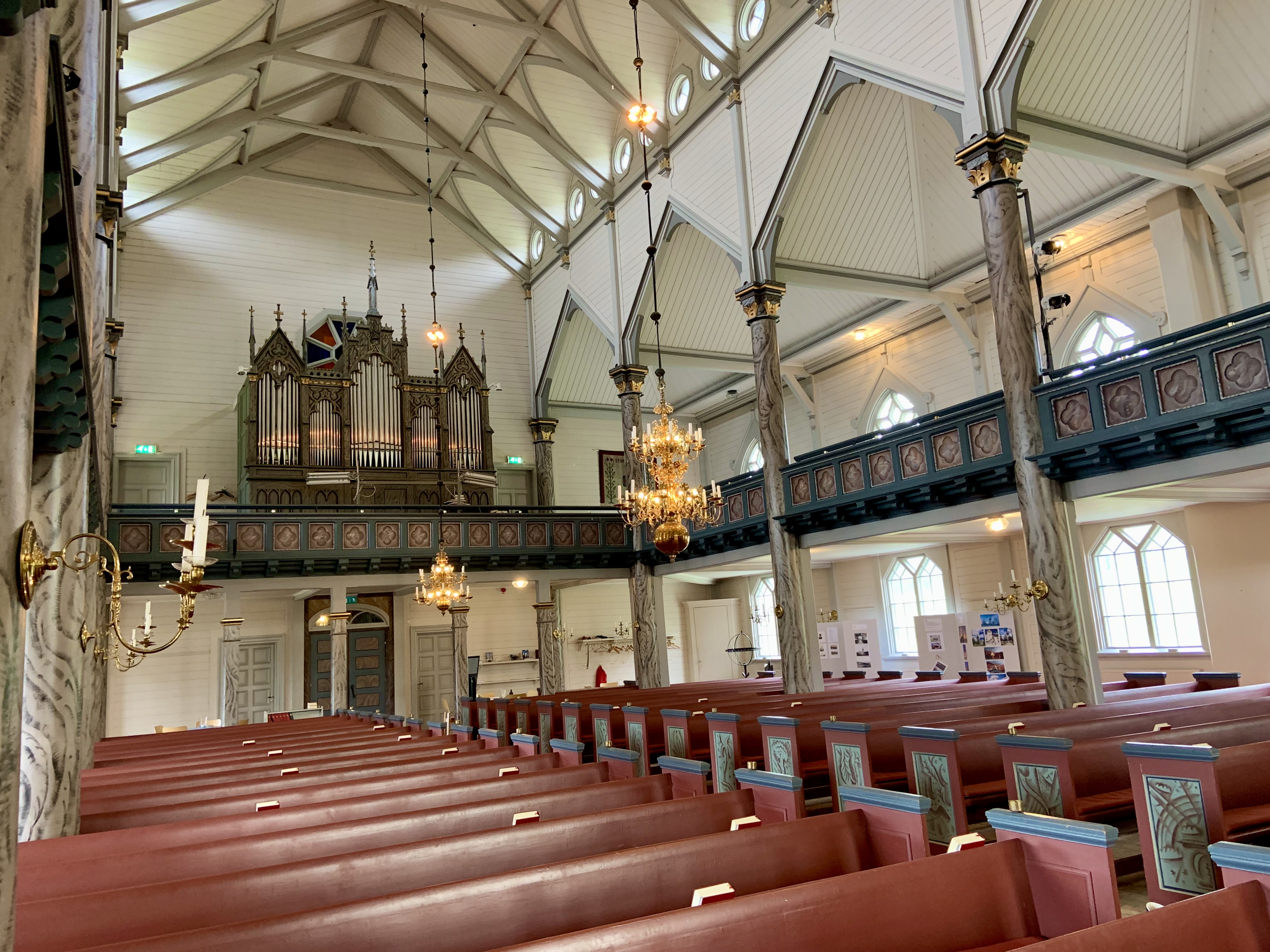
Interior of Duved Church

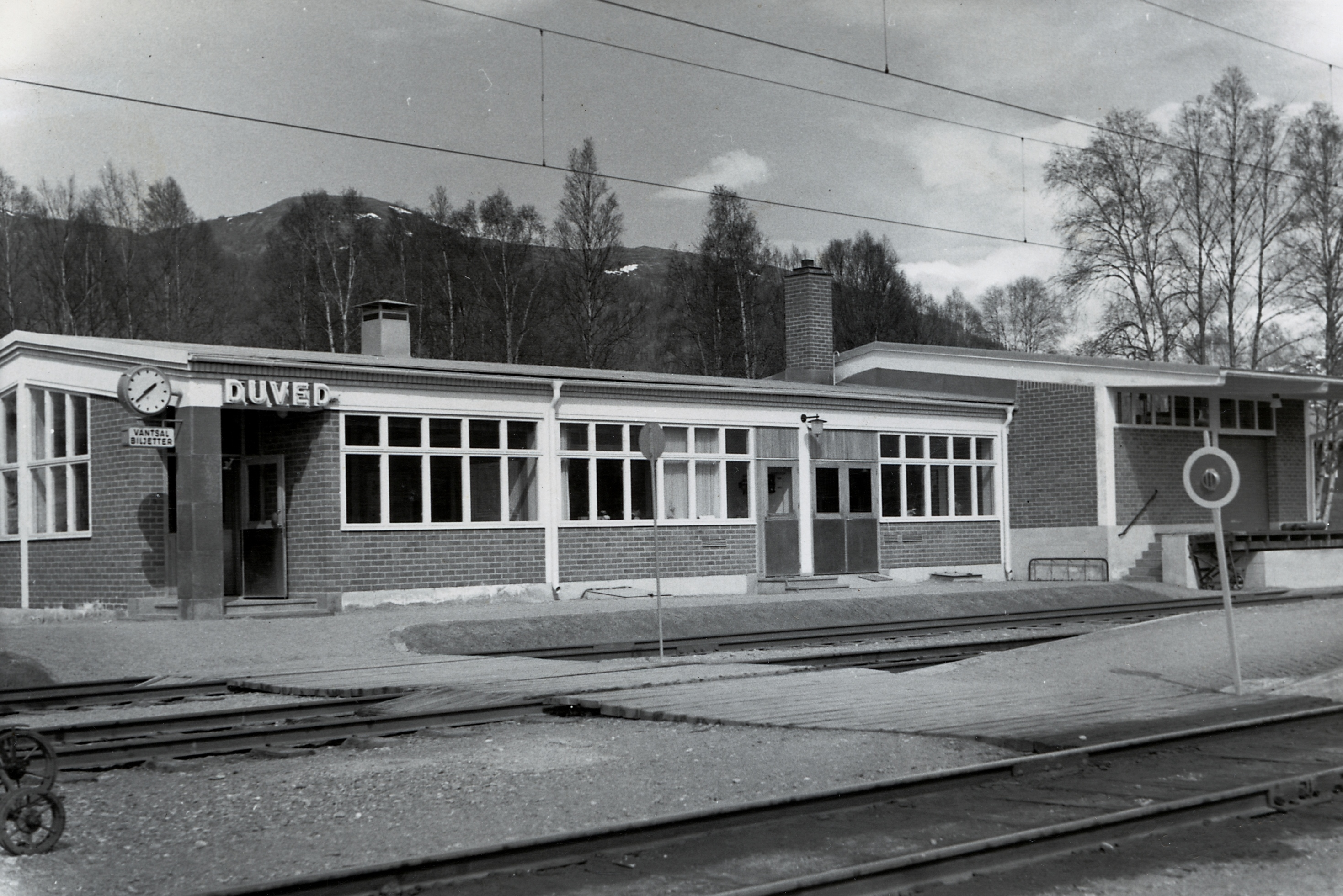
Duved station

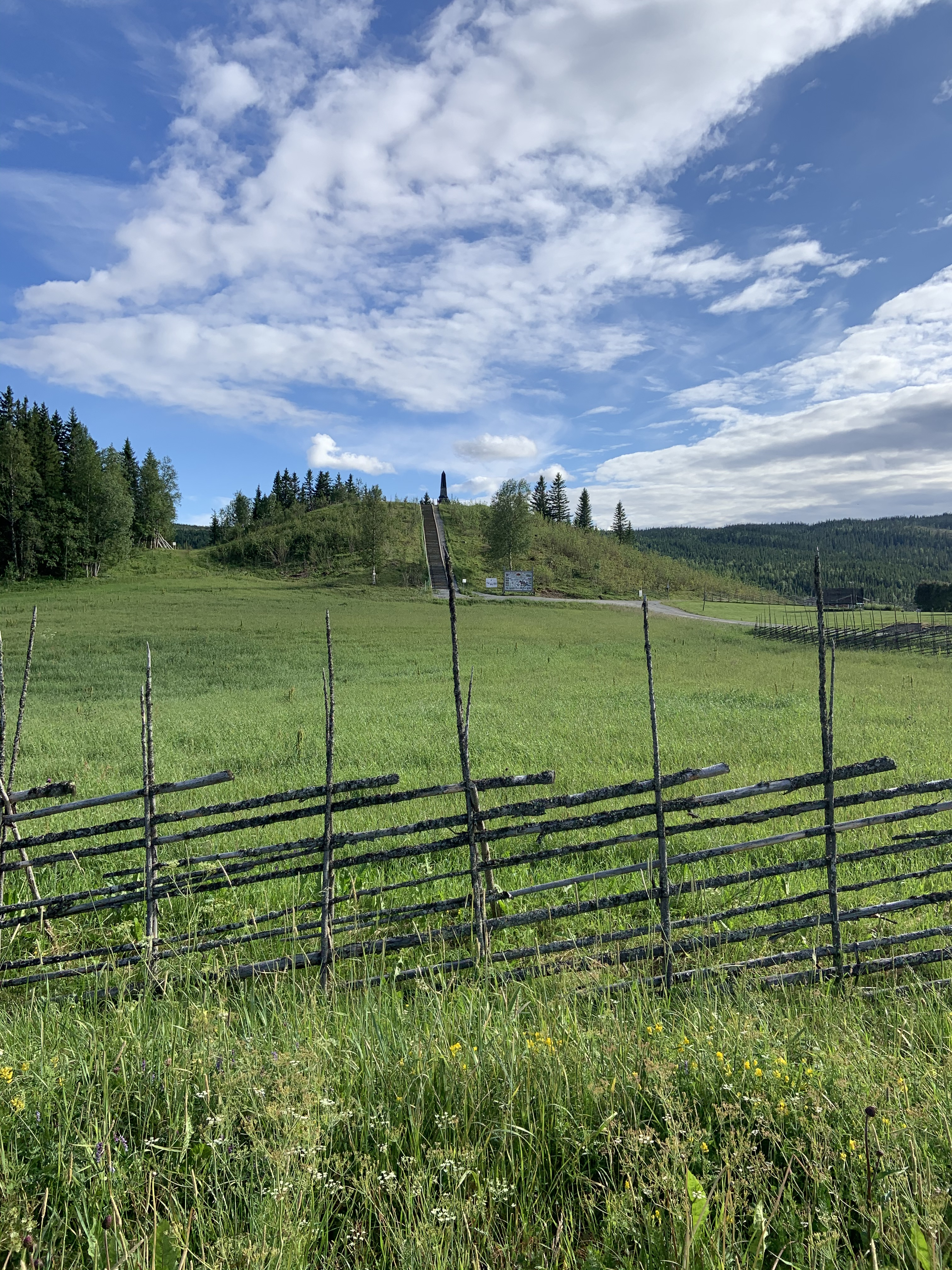
One of two sconces in Duved, the Åre sconce with the Caroleans' monument.

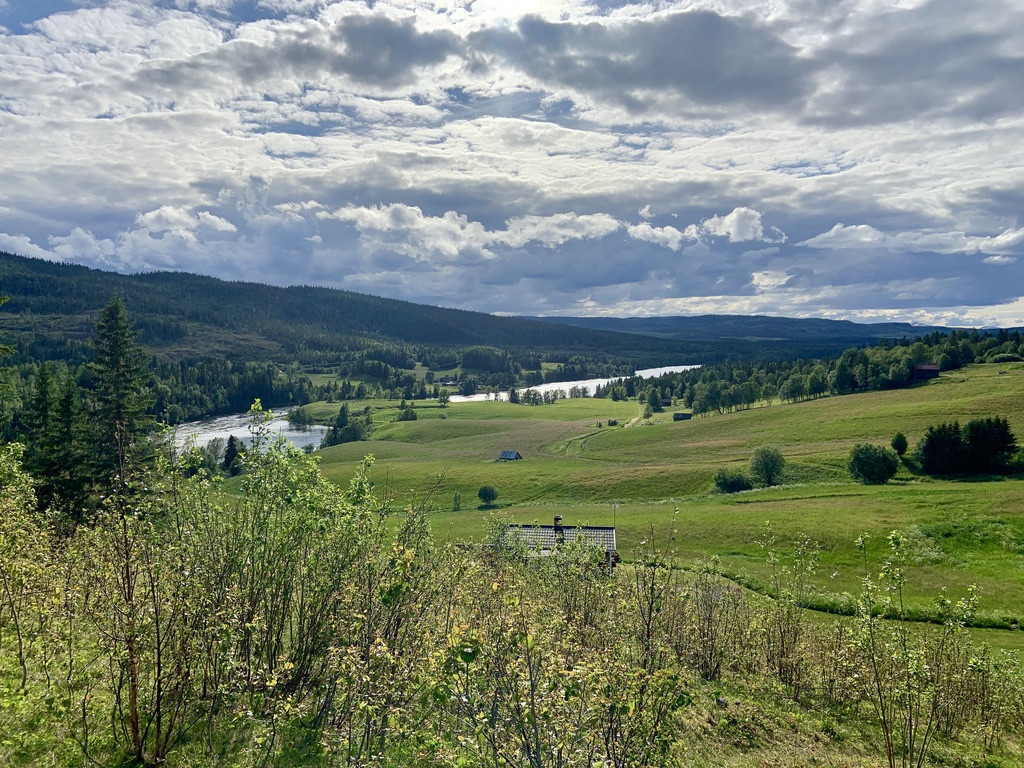
View on the other one, Duved sconce.
