= Åre Municipality =

Åre Municipality Åre kommun
- Municipality
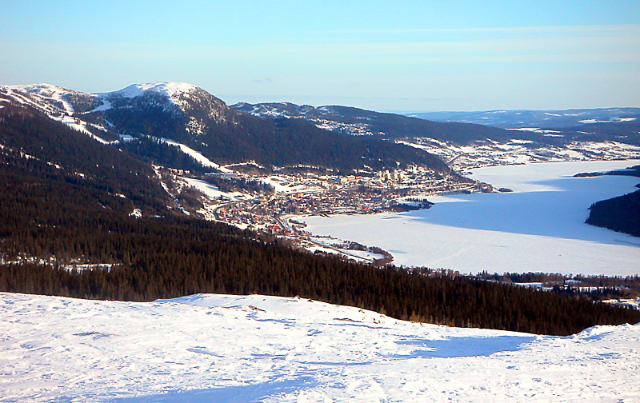
- Åresjön and Åre seen from the Mullfell in nearby Duved

- Coat of arms

- Coordinates: 63°21′N 13°28′E
- Country: Sweden
- County: Jämtland County
- Seat: Järpen

Area
  - Total: 8,236.54 km^{2} (3,180.15 sq mi)
  - Land: 7,199.45 km^{2} (2,779.72 sq mi)
  - Water: 1,037.09 km^{2} (400.42 sq mi)
- Area as of 1 January 2014.

Population (30 June 2025)
  - Total: 12,620
  - Density: 1.753/km^{2} (4.540/sq mi)
- Time zone: UTC+1 (CET)
  - Summer (DST): UTC+2 (CEST)
- ISO 3166 code: SE
- Province: Jämtland
- Municipal code: 2321
- Website: www.are.se

Åre Municipality (Swedish: Åre kommun, Southern Sami: Ååren tjïelte) is a municipality in Jämtland County in northern Sweden. Its seat is located in Järpen.

The present municipality was formed in 1974 through the amalgamation of "old" Åre Municipality with the surrounding municipalities Hallen, Kall, Mörsil and Undersåker. The largest village, Järpen, situated in Undersåker, was chosen as the seat of the new entity.

== Localities ==
There are six localities (or urban areas) in Åre Municipality:

#	Locality	Population
1	**Järpen**	1,439
2	Åre	1,260
3	Mörsil	674
4	Duved	637
5	Undersåker	384
6	Hallen	223

The municipal seat in bold

== Demographics ==
This is a demographic table based on Åre Municipality's electoral districts in the 2022 Swedish general election sourced from SVT's election platform, in turn taken from SCB official statistics.

In total there were 12,246 residents, including 9,076 Swedish citizens of voting age. 57.9% voted for the left coalition and 40.9% for the right coalition. Indicators are in percentage points except population totals and income.

Location	Residents	Citizen adults	Left vote	Right vote	Employed	Swedish parents	Foreign heritage	Income SEK	Degree
Location			%	%					
Duved-Storlien	2,396	1,741	62.3	37.2	80	85	15	26,023	48
Hallen-Marby	1,150	931	46.2	52.3	87	94	6	23,991	35
Järpen	1,876	1,357	57.2	41.5	79	76	24	21,625	26
Kall	543	440	52.6	44.1	87	90	10	22,750	28
Mattmar	545	425	51.1	48.0	86	93	7	24,523	40
Mörsil	1,191	805	48.5	50.4	80	74	26	23,103	30
Undersåker	2,162	1,572	65.3	33.8	84	91	9	26,561	55
Åre	2,383	1,805	60.4	38.5	80	90	10	26,744	51
Source: SVT

== Notable people ==
- Henrik Lundqvist – Former goalkeeper for the New York Rangers of the National Hockey League, and the Frölunda Indians of the Swedish Hockey League, gold medalist in the Winter Olympics in 2006. Born in Åre, though he moved to Båstad to support his sister's tennis career. He is twins with Joel Lundqvist.
- Joel Lundqvist – center for the Frölunda Indians (SHL), former center for the Dallas Stars (NHL), 2 time world champion. Born in Åre, though he moved to Båstad to support his sister's tennis career. He is twins with Henrik Lundqvist.

== Gallery ==
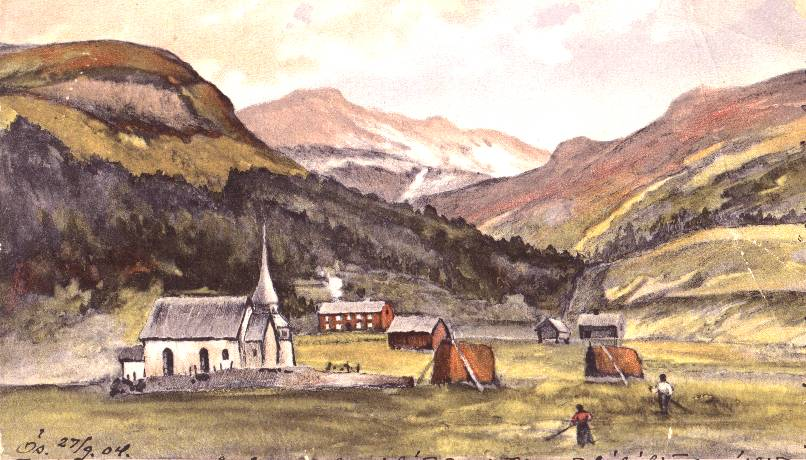
View of Åre, postcard sent on September 27, 1904 (postal rate 0:05)

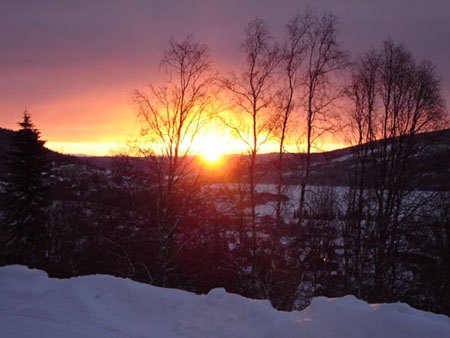
Sunrise over Åresjön

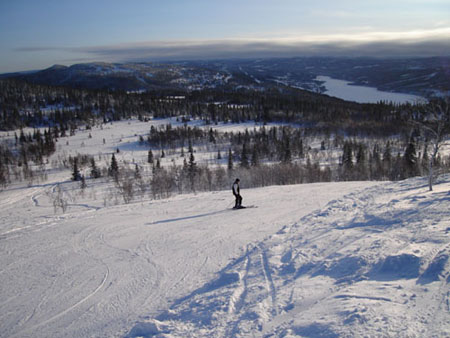
Lake and ski slope on Björnen side of Åreskutan

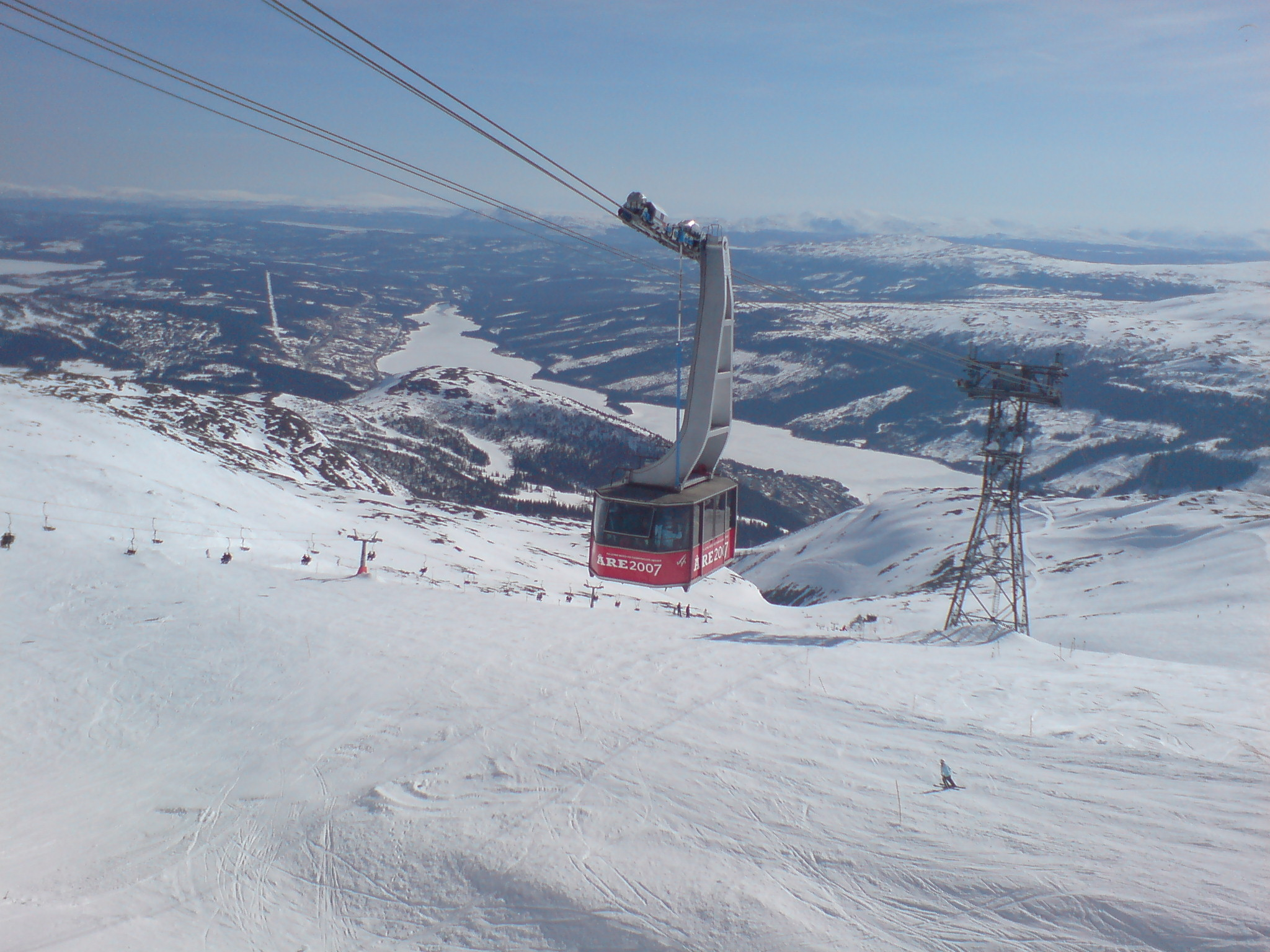
The cable car in Åre

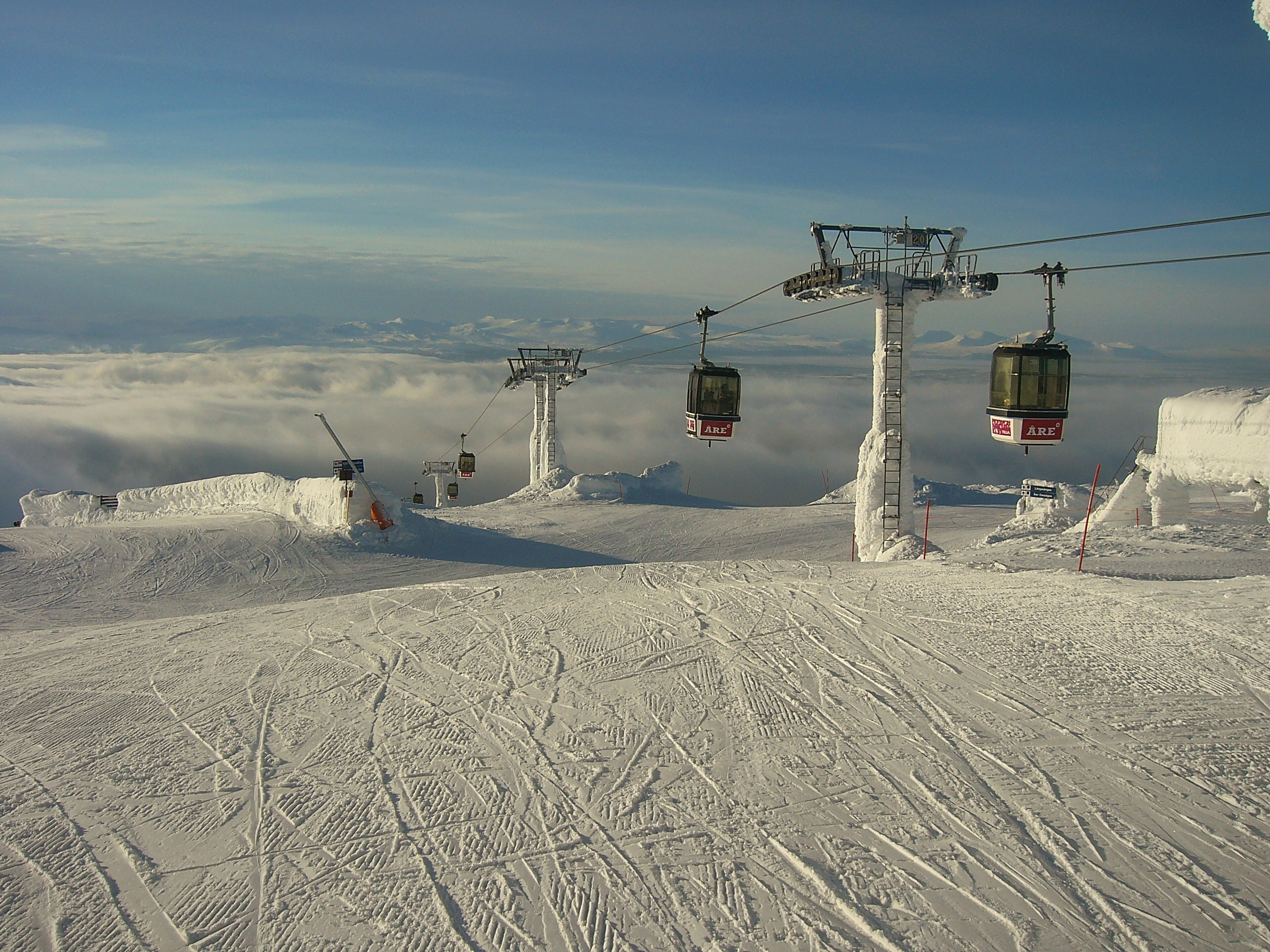
The gondola lift to the top of the Åre Ski Area

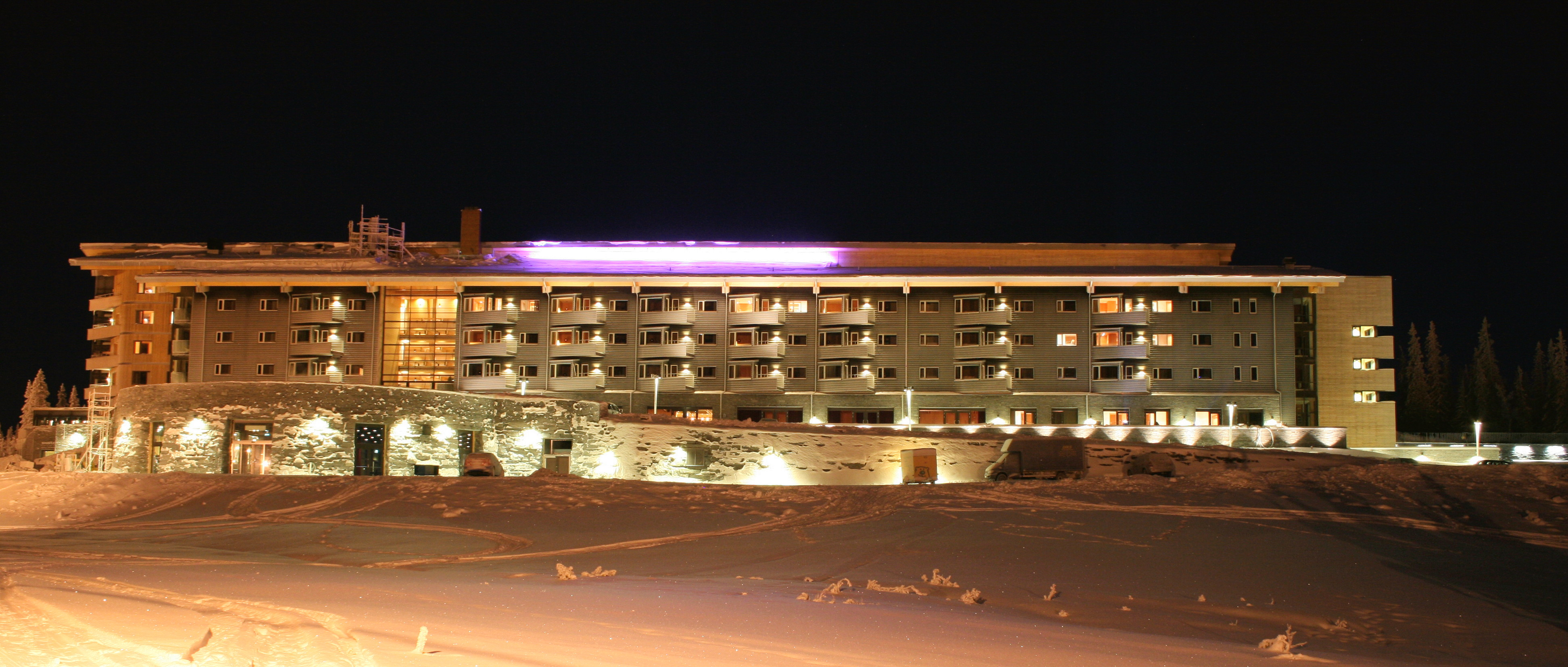
Copperhill Mountain Lodge hotel in Åre

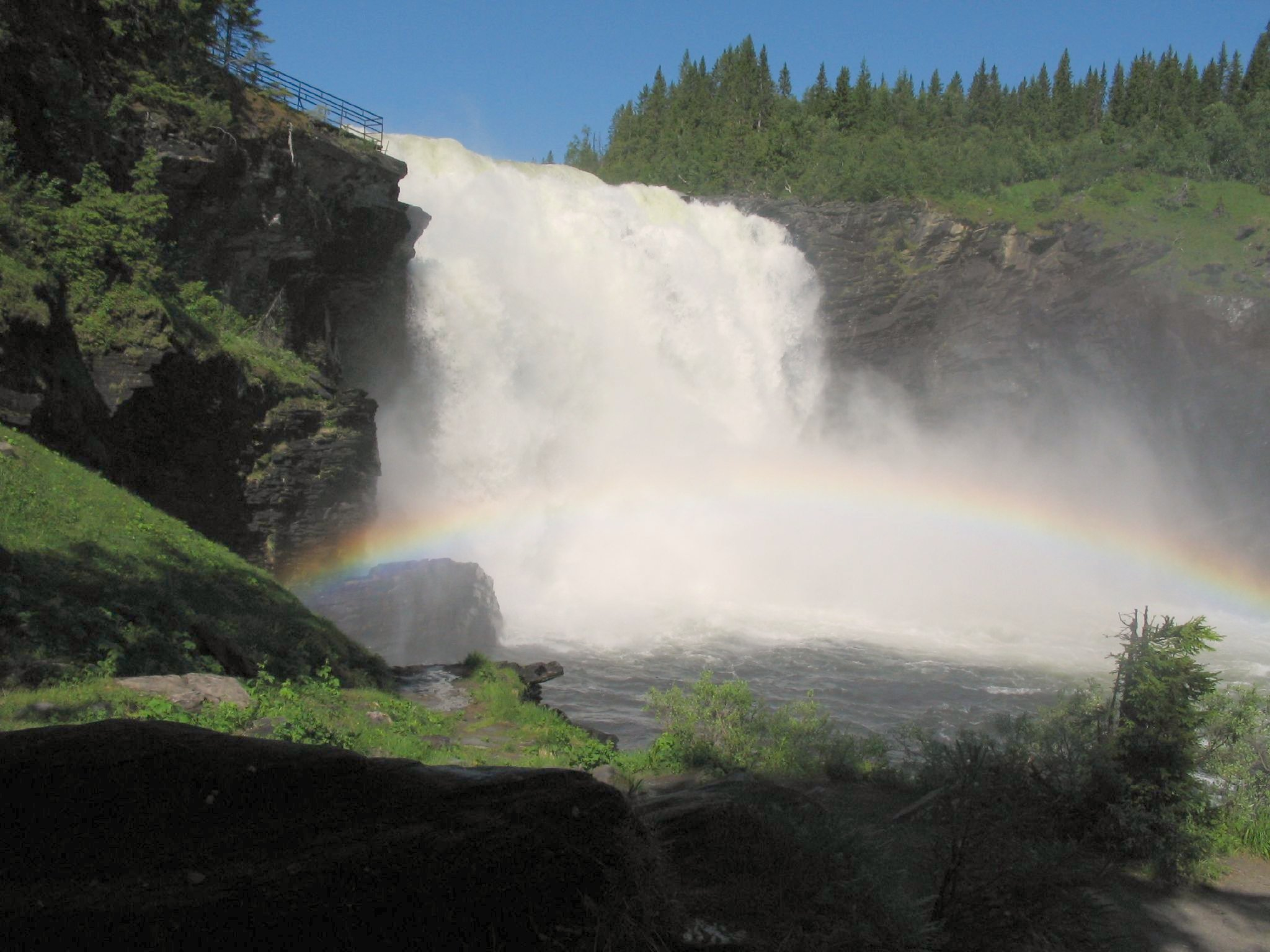
Tännforsen

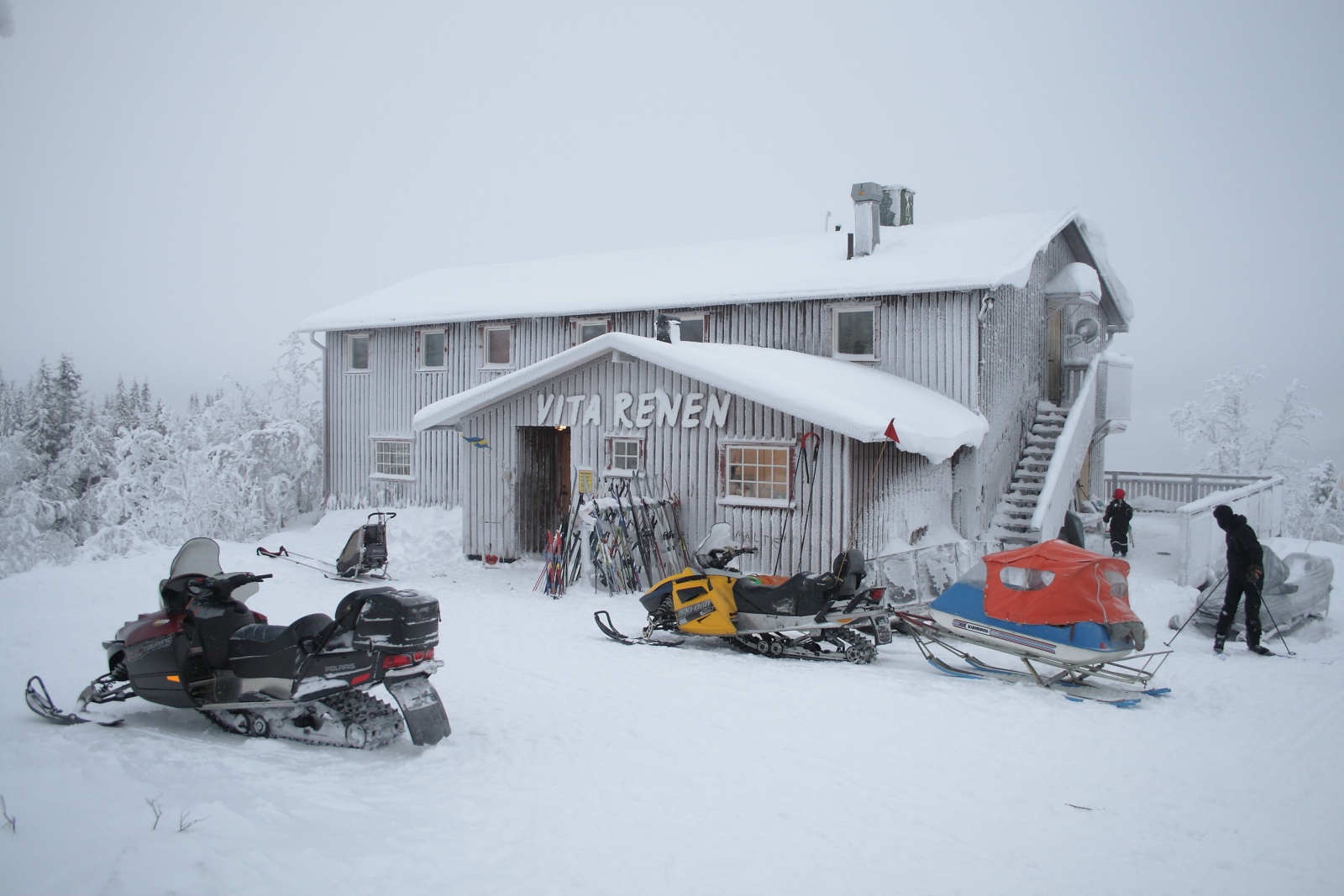
Vita Renen hostel and café on Renfjället

== See also ==
- Åre Ski Area
- Edsåsdalen
- Skalstugan
